= NS DM 90 =

Diesel multiple unit

NS Class 3400 (DM'90)
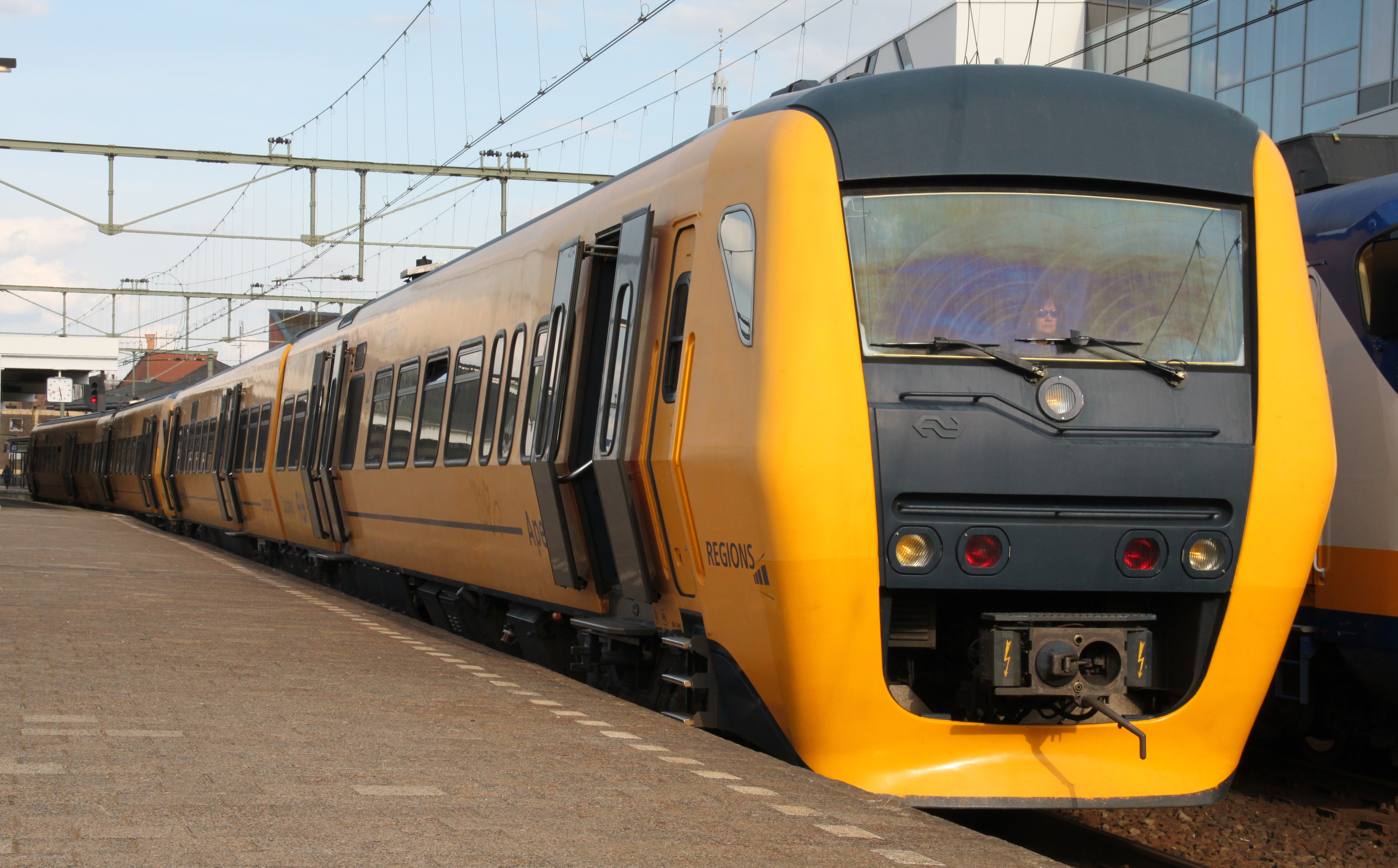
- An NS Class 3400 at Zutphen

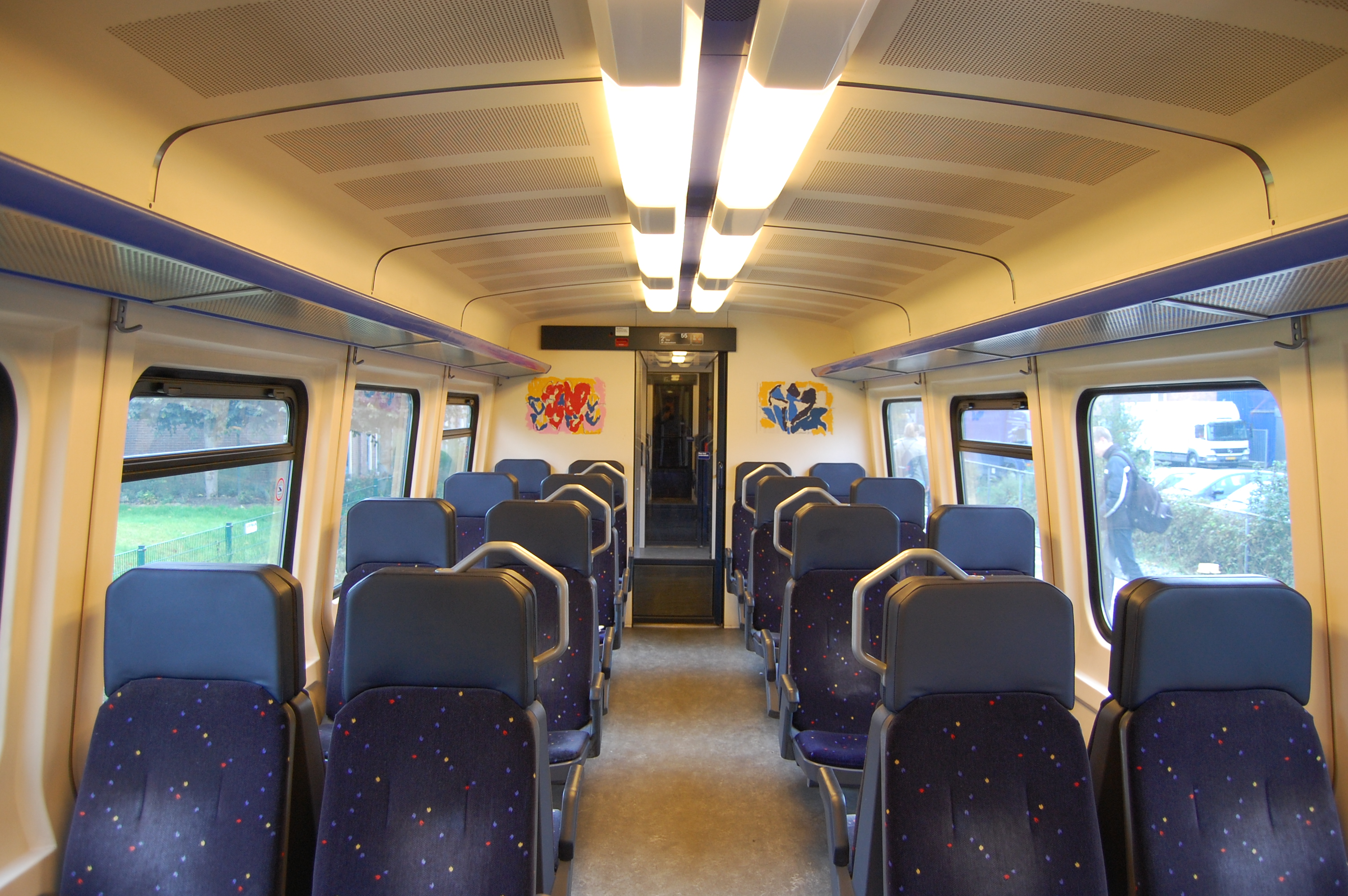
- DM'90 interior in 2007
- Stock type: Diesel multiple unit
- In service: 1996-2019 (NS); 2024-present (SKPL)
- Manufacturer: Talbot
- Assembly: Aachen, Germany
- Constructed: 1996-1998
- Retired: 2010-2011; 2017-2019
- Number built: 53
- Number in service: 14 (PKP)
- Number retired: 53
- Number scrapped: 1
- Successor: Stadler FLIRT units
- Formation: 2 cars per unit
- Fleet numbers: 3401-3453 (NS); 50-62 (Syntus); 001-014 (PKP)
- Capacity: 12 first class 123 standard class 34 folding seats
- Owners: Nederlandse Spoorwegen; Brouwers Techniek; Happy Train Fleet Services BV; SKPL
- Operators: Nederlandse Spoorwegen (Netherlands); PKP Intercity (Poland)
- Depots: Nedtrain Hengelo (Netherlands); Lokomotywownia Kraków Prokocim (Poland)

Specifications
- Train length: 52.340 m (171 ft 8 5/8 in)
- Width: 3.20 m (10 ft 6 in)
- Height: 4.142 m (13 ft 7 1/8 in)
- Floor height: 1.160 m (3 ft 9 5/8 in)
- Doors: Pneumatic swivel swing doors
- Wheel diameter: 920 mm (new); 840 mm (worn out)
- Maximum speed: 140 km/h (87 mph)
- Weight: 95.2 t (93.7 long tons; 104.9 short tons)
- Prime mover: 2 x Cummins NTA 855 R4
- Power output: 2 x 320 kW (430 hp) = 640 kW (860 hp)
- Transmission: Hydraulic
- Acceleration: 0.6 m/s^{2} (2.0 ft/s^{2})
- UIC classification: 2'B' + B'2'
- Braking system: <R> O-RA-Mg (D) (?)
- Safety system: ATB-NG
- Coupling system: Scharfenberg
- Multiple working: Yes
- Track gauge: 1,435 mm (4 ft 8 1/2 in) standard gauge

The NS Class 3400, referred to as DM'90, was a series of diesel multiple unit which were in service in the Netherlands between 1996 and 2017 and were built by Duewag, Talbot and SIG between 1996 and 1998. They were operated by the Nederlandse Spoorwegen and between 1999 until 2014 under lease by Syntus. DM'90, their classification, means diesel rolling stock (Diesel Materieel in Dutch) of the 1990s or Buffel, which means Buffalo. The DM'90 series was developed alongside the short lived electric counter part, the SM'90 ("stopping-train" or commuter rolling stock of the 1990s) series with which it shares the unusual body cross section. The Class 3400 were the last DMUs in service with NS, the older DE3 "Plan U" and DH1/2 "Wadloper" series having been replaced by the diesel electric Stadler GTW which are still in use with other operators in the Netherlands. Since January 2018, all units are now stored out of service and 32 units have been sold to the SKPL - Poland's private railway operator, where they have been reclassified to SD85.

== History ==
In 1993, NS ordered 53 units of the class from Talbot, now Bombardier. The electrical systems, train controls, and diagnostic systems were delivered by Holec Ridderkerk, now Alstom. Duewag installed the interiors of the trains in Krefeld, after which the units were transferred to the Netherlands. Unit 3401 was delivered on 12 March 1996; the last unit, 3453, was brought into service in 1998.

Originally there were intentions to order a follow-up series of the 2-car units, alongside the possible development of a single-car unit, however these were never realised due to the privatisation of many of the diesel-served lines.

The rolling stock was introduced in the end of the 1990s on a large portion of the non-electrified lines in the Netherlands. In the period thereafter many of these routes were transferred to private sector operators, Syntus and several other operators used the sets for their services, others were temporarily used on electrified sectors for local services.

== Description ==
Like the SM'90 ("Railhopper"), the DM'90 uses a non-standard width of 3.2 metres (10 ft 6 in), this was made possible by the distinctly bent side-walls which allowed the cars to be 30 centimetres (11 3/4 in) wider than conventional trains while being within the loading gauge. This allowed a 5 abreast seating arrangement, however the trains were eventually delivered with only the standard 4 abreast configuration.

Power is provided by two Cummins (NTA 855 R4) diesel motors, each delivering up to 320 kW (430 hp) of power to the Voith hydraulic transmission, driving the axles on the inner bogies. The bogies were Stork-manufactured RMO 9000 series, also used on the SM'90, and DD-IRM trains. The top speed was 140 km/h (87 mph), reduced to 100 km/h (62 mph) when running in combination with the older (also diesel-hydraulic) Wadloper series trains.

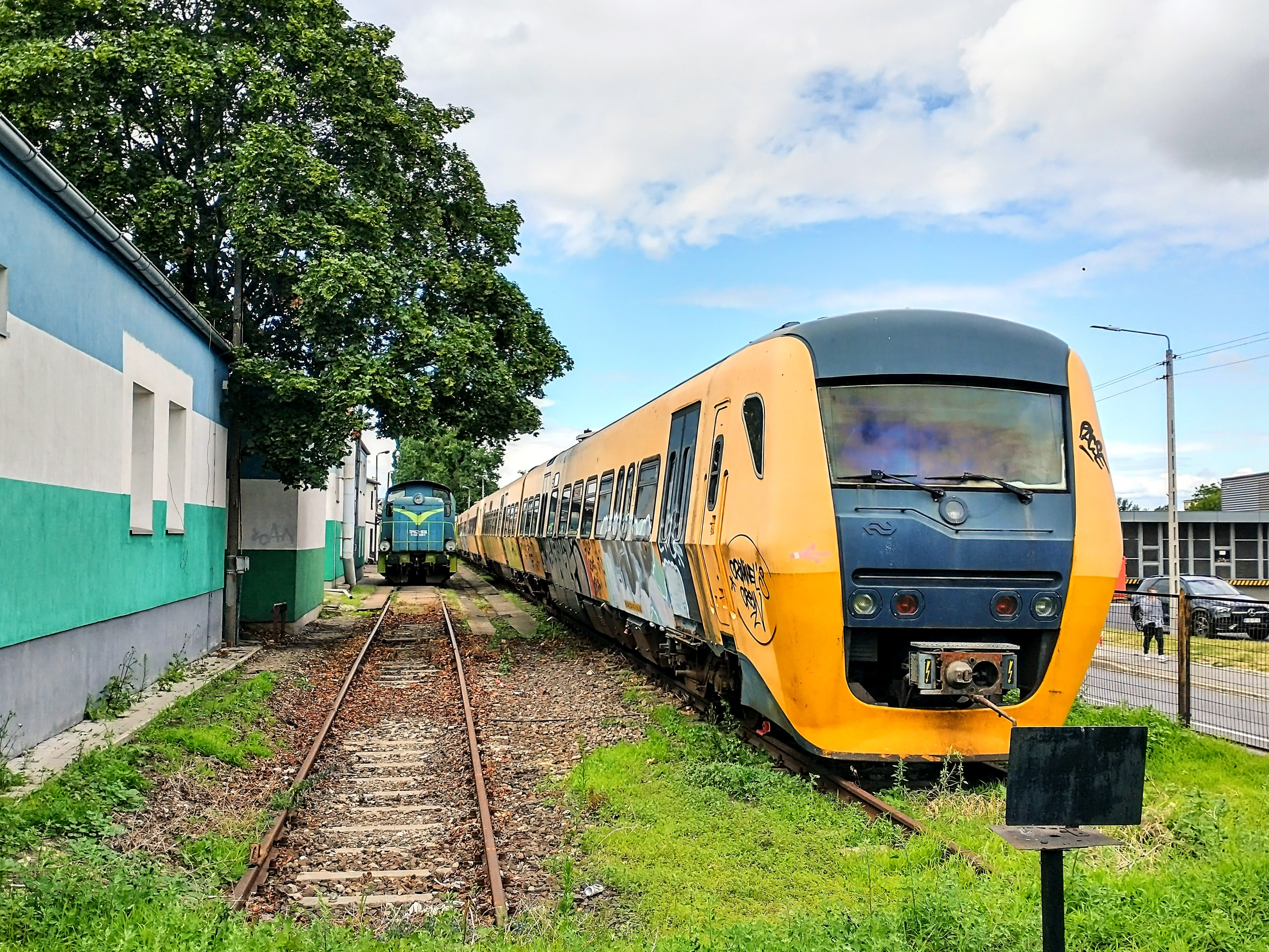
DM 90 owned by SKPL stored in Ostrów Wielkopolski

The combination of disk brakes and quiet operation results that the trains were often poorly detected by axle counters which are commonly found on the lines where the DM'90 operates. Train-protection is provided by ATB-NG. For cross-border operations out of Heerlen, three sets were equipped with the German PZB train protection system along with boarding steps to accommodate the lower platform height.

Between 2008 and 2013, the sets operating between Zwolle and Kampen were provided with passenger information displays showing connection information in Zwolle, as tendered by the province of Overijssel.

The trains were equipped with heating provided by both engine heat and, when necessary, additional electrical heaters. In depots, the heaters can be powered externally to avoid the need for operating the motors. Air conditioning is only present in the driver cab.

== Specific operations ==
3403 and 3410 were branded for the Zwolle - Kampen service. 3401, 3402, 3404, 3412 and 3414 were branded for the Apeldoorn - Zutphen service.

== Previous operations ==
Operations on these lines transferred from Syntus to Arriva since the start of the public transport timetable 2013.

Series	Train Type	Route	Material	Notes
17800	Sprinter	Apeldoorn - Apeldoorn De Maten - Klarenbeek - Voorst-Empe - Zutphen	Buffel (DM'90)	
30700	Syntus stoptrein	Arnhem - Arnhem Velperpoort - Duiven - Zevenaar - Didam - Wehl - Doetinchem De Huet - Doetinchem	Buffel (DM'90) / Lint 41	Only weekdays until 19.00h
30900	Syntus stoptrein	Arnhem - Arnhem Velperpoort - Duiven - Zevenaar - Didam - Wehl - Doetinchem De Huet - Doetinchem - Gaanderen - Terborg - Varsseveld - Aalten - Winterswijk	Buffel (DM '90) / Lint 41	
31100	Syntus stoptrein	Arnhem - Elst - Zetten-Andelst - Hemmen-Dodewaard - Opheusden - Kesteren - Tiel	Buffel (DM'90)	
32300	Veolia stoptrein	Nijmegen - Nijmegen Heyendaal - Mook-Molenhoek - Cuijk - Boxmeer - Vierlingsbeek - Venray (- Blerick - Venlo)	Buffel (DM'90) / Velios	Only during rush hour
20100	Stoptrein	Hengelo - Oldenzaal - Bad Bentheim	Buffel (DM'90)	
7900	Stoptrein	Zwolle - Heino - Raalte - Nijverdal - Wierden - Almelo - Almelo de Riet - Borne - Hengelo - Enschede Kennispark - Enschede	Buffel (DM'90)	
8500	Stoptrein	Zwolle - Kampen	Buffel (DM'90)	

== Details ==
Series:	Built:	Quantity When New:	Numbers When New:	Still In Service:	Out Of Service:
DM'90	1996–1998	53	3401 - 3453	None	All

== Syntus details ==
NS Number:	Syntus Number:	In service with Syntus since:
3450	50	30 May 1999
3451	51	30 May 1999
3452	52	30 May 1999
3453	53	30 May 1999
3441	54	14 December 2003
3442	55	14 December 2003
3440	56	18 January 2005
3438	57	1 April 2005
3439	58	1 April 2005
3437	59	11 June 2007
3448	60	3 February 2009
3449	61	3 February 2009
3436	-	18 December 2010
3447	-	2 September 2011
3446	-	23 September 2011
3435	-	1 October 2011
3445	-	28 October 2011
3422	-	4 November 2011
3444	-	3 December 2011

== Gallery ==
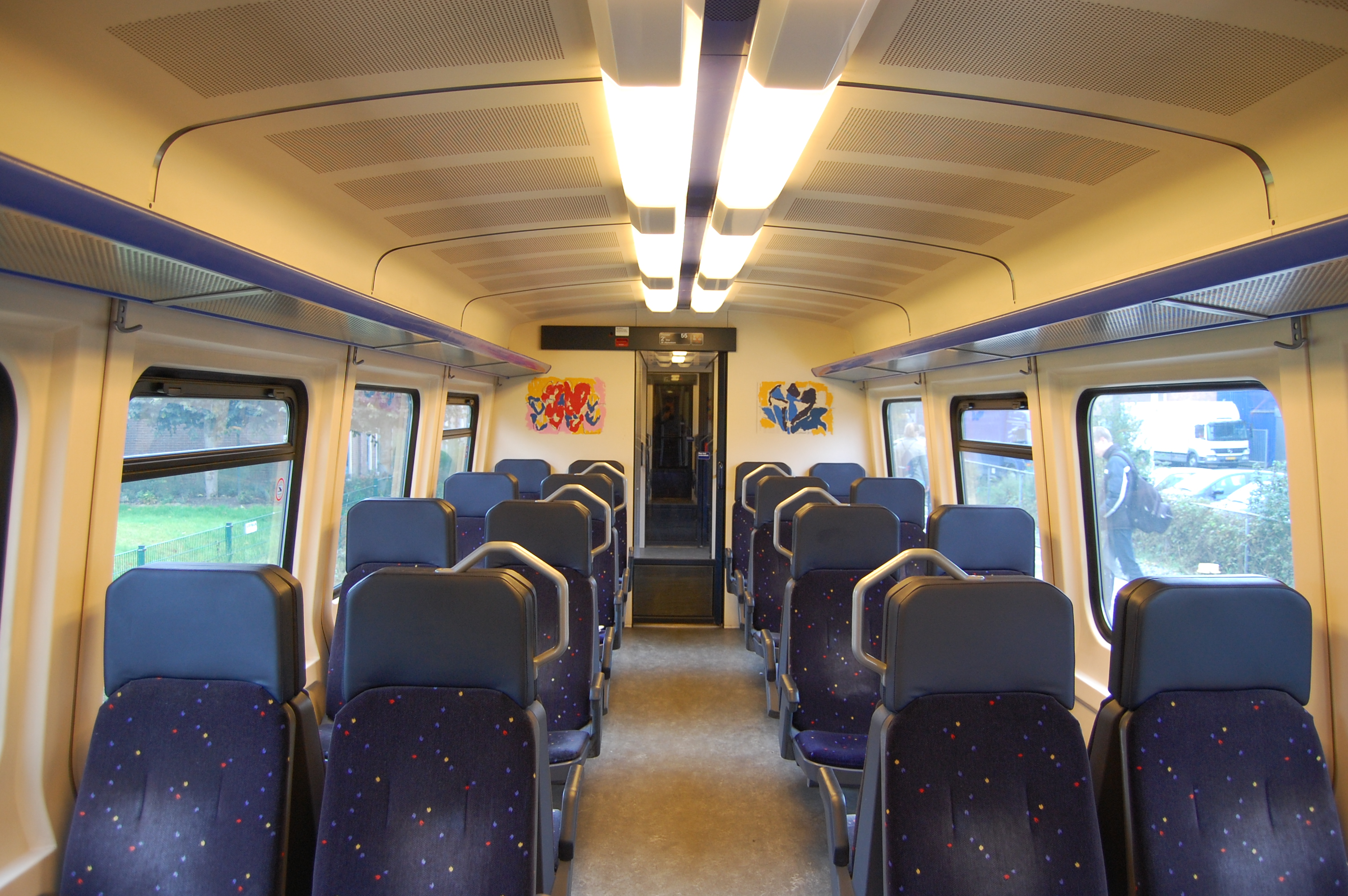
Interior of the DM '90

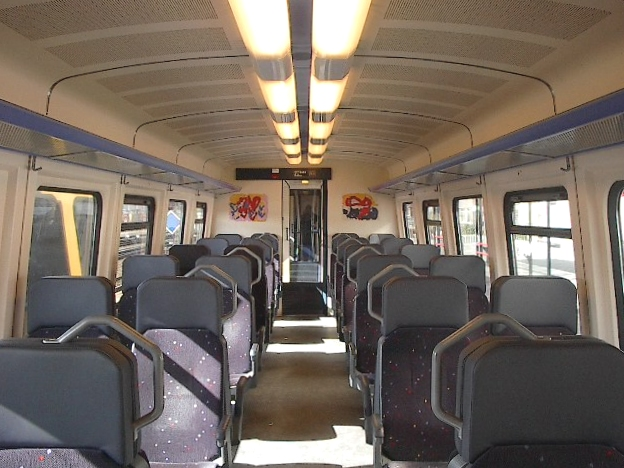
Interior of the DM '90

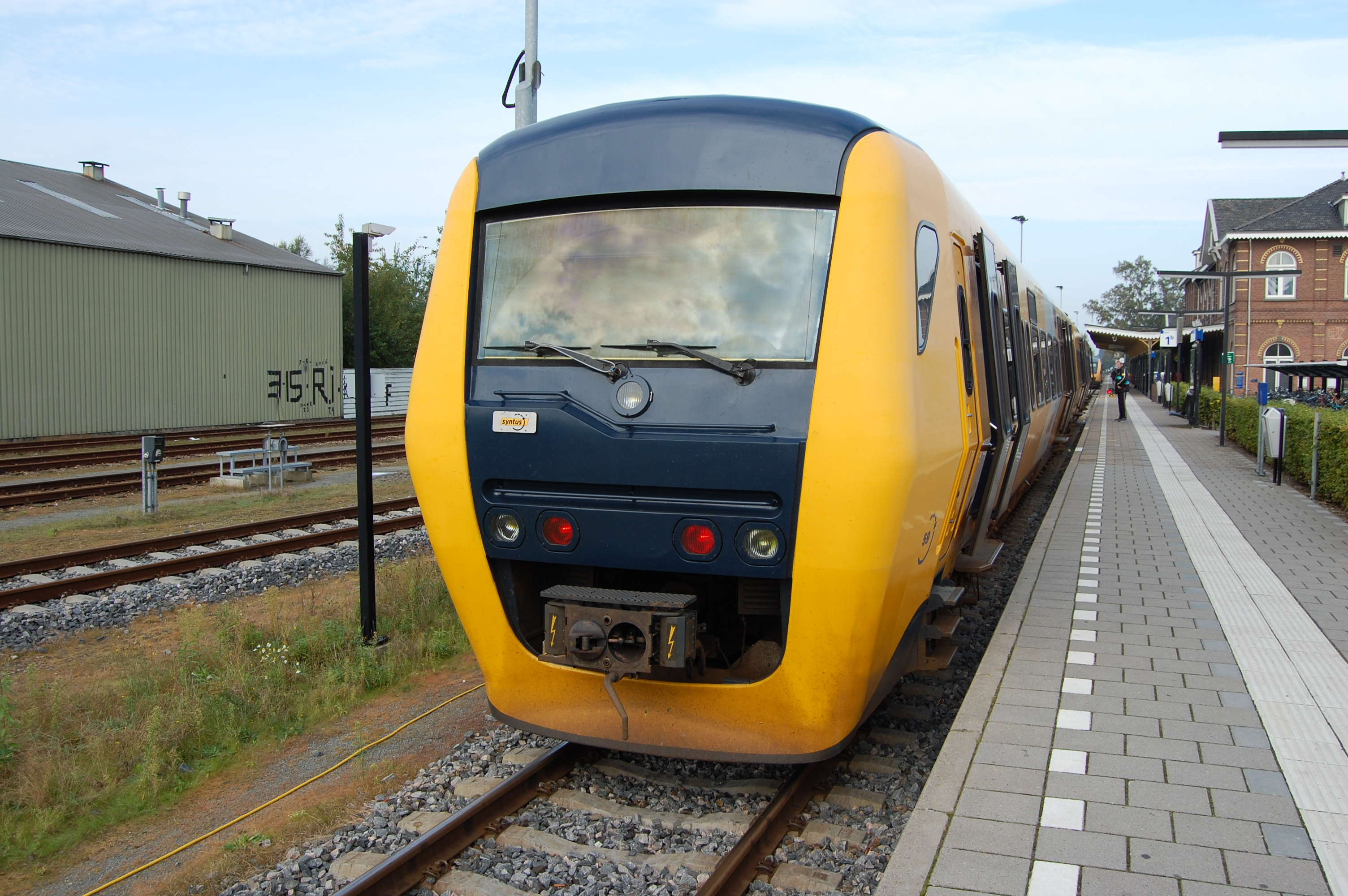
A DM '90 hired to Syntus at Winterswijk

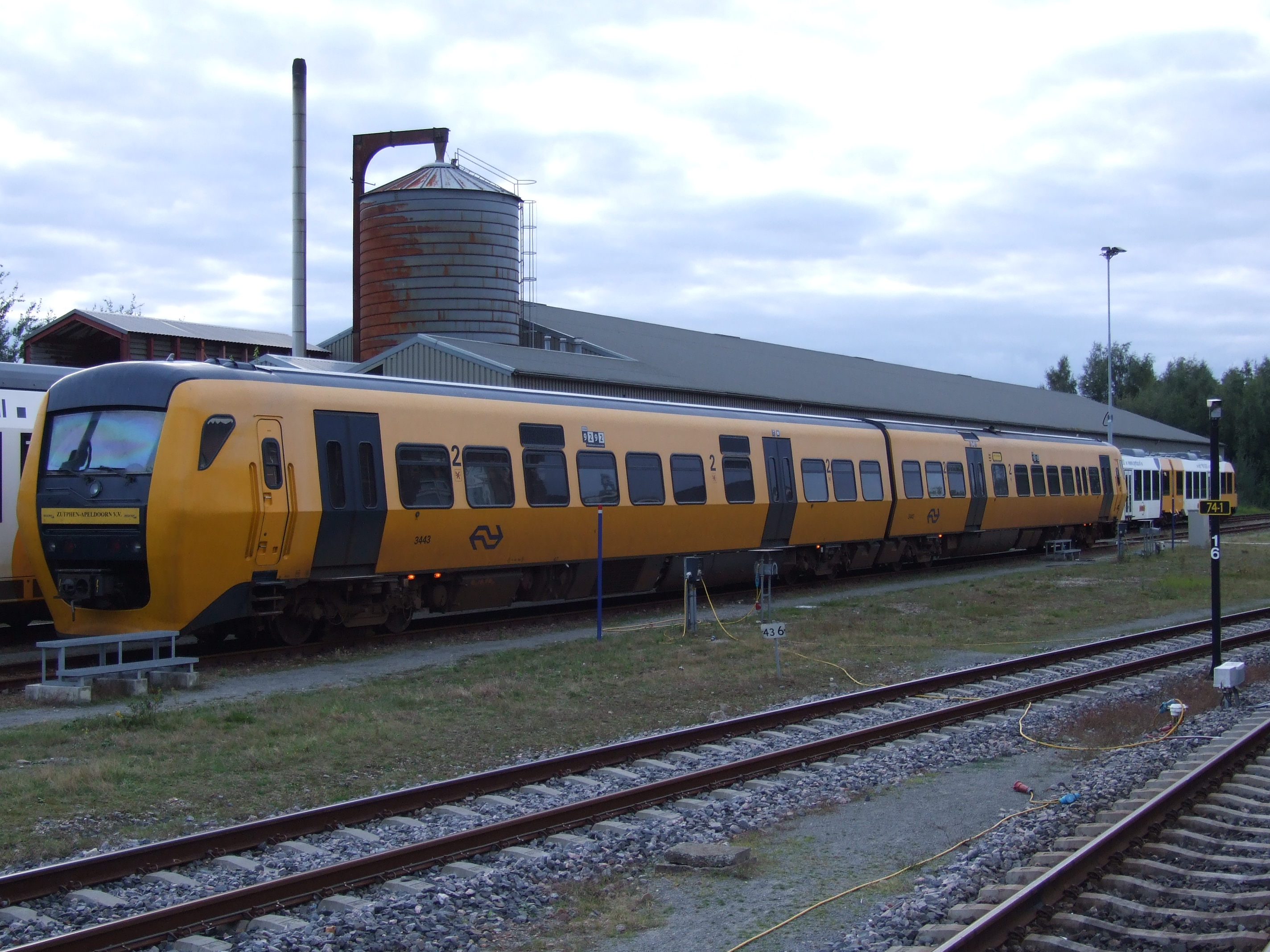
A DM '90 for the Apeldoorn - Zutphen service at Winterswijk for maintenance

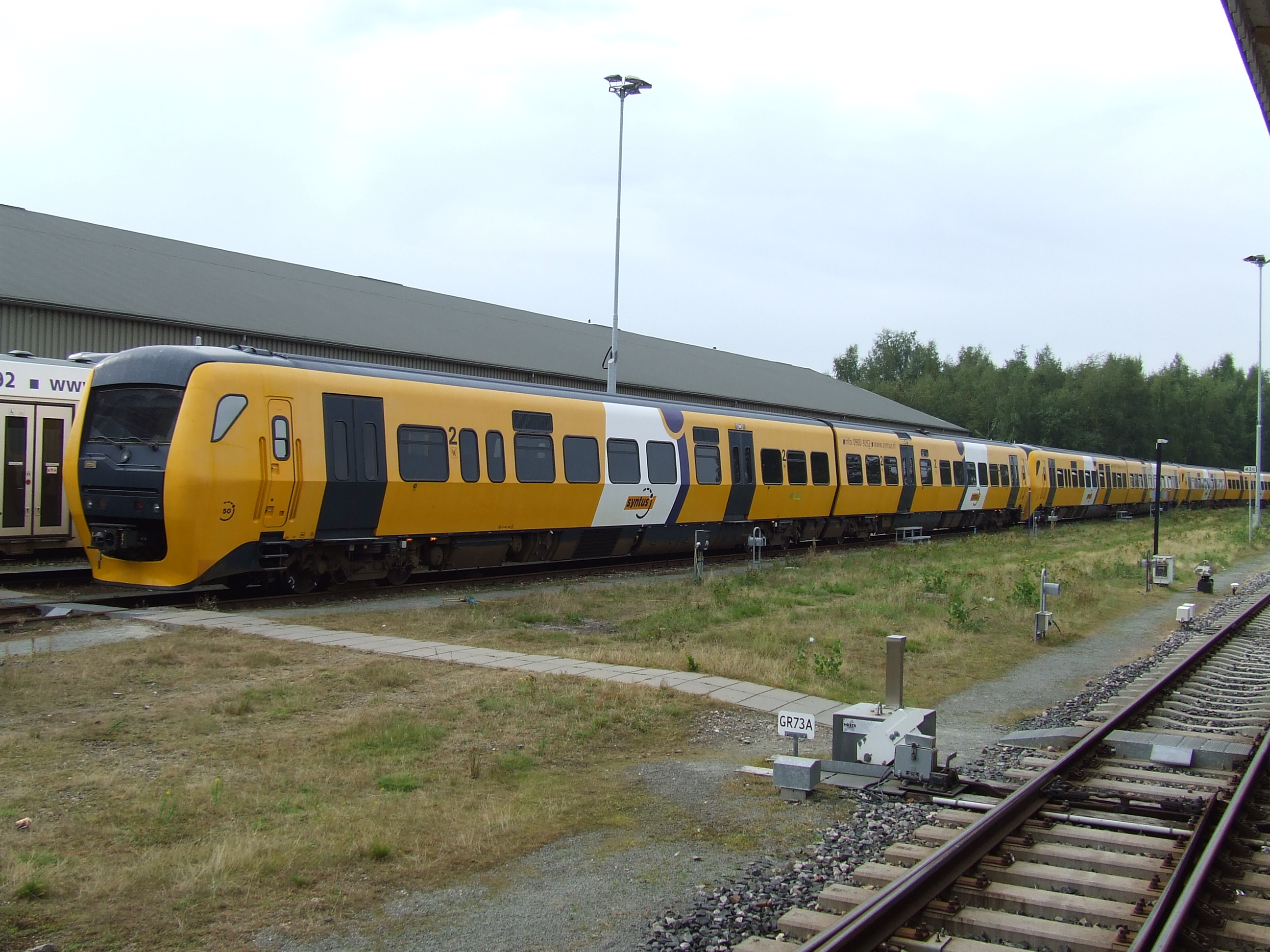
Several DM '90's at Winterswijk

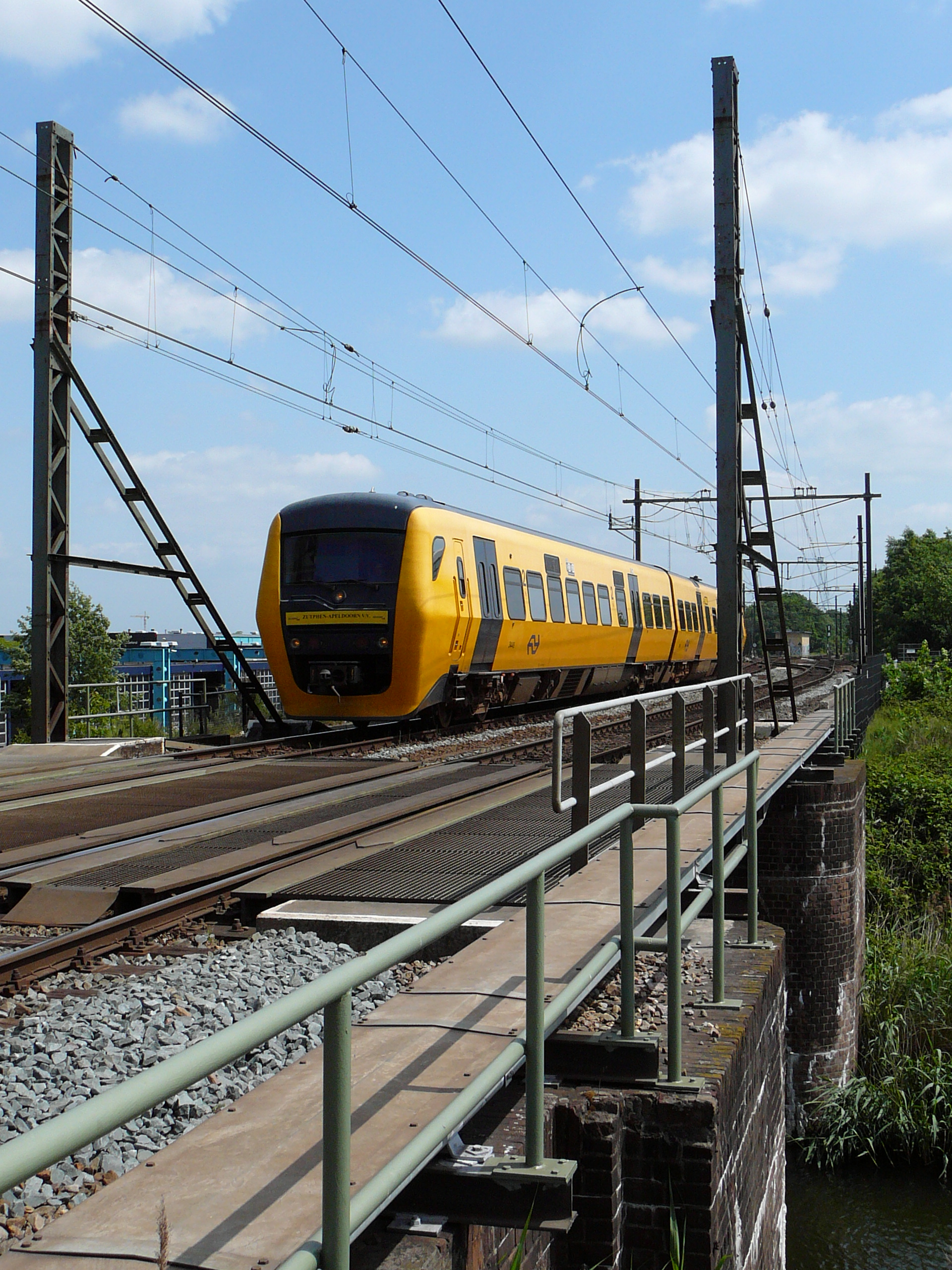
A DM '90 for the Apeldoorn - Zutphen service approaching Apeldoorn

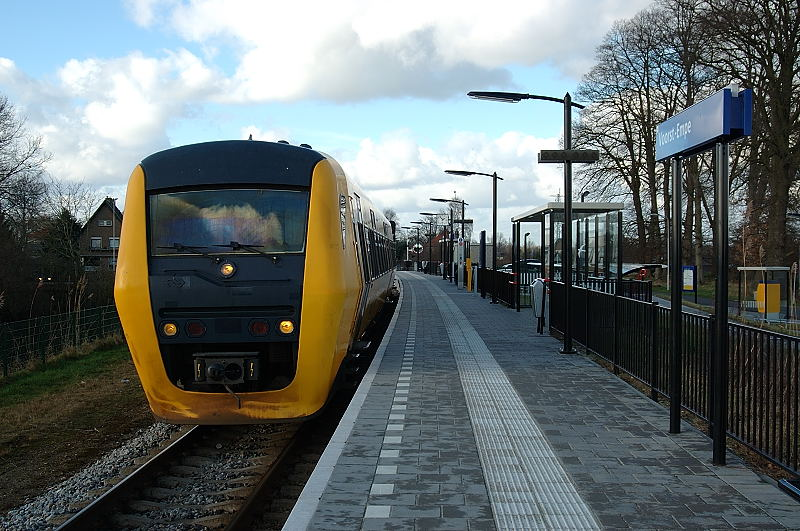
A DM '90 at Voorst-Empe

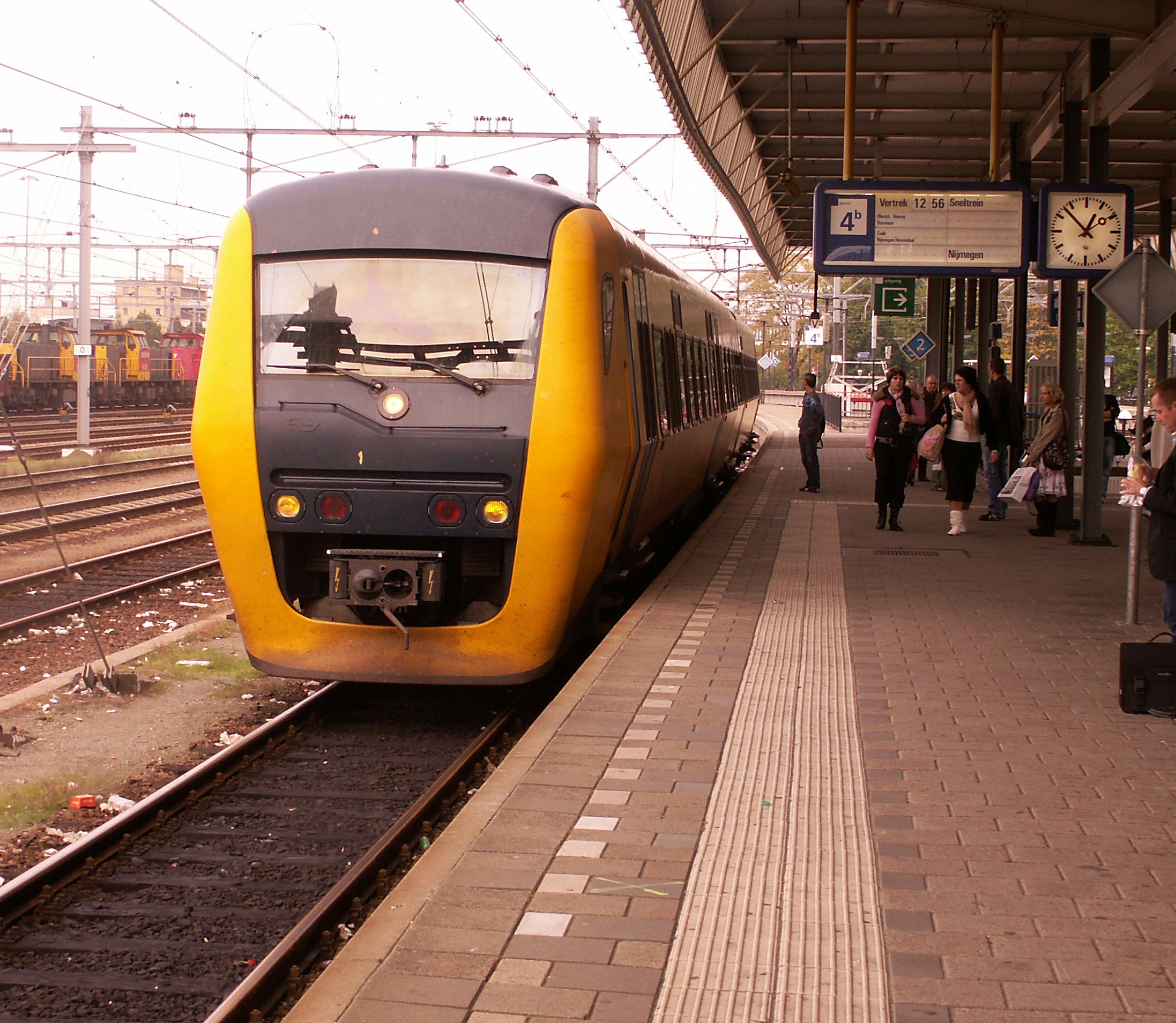
A DM '90 at Venlo before Veolia took over the service

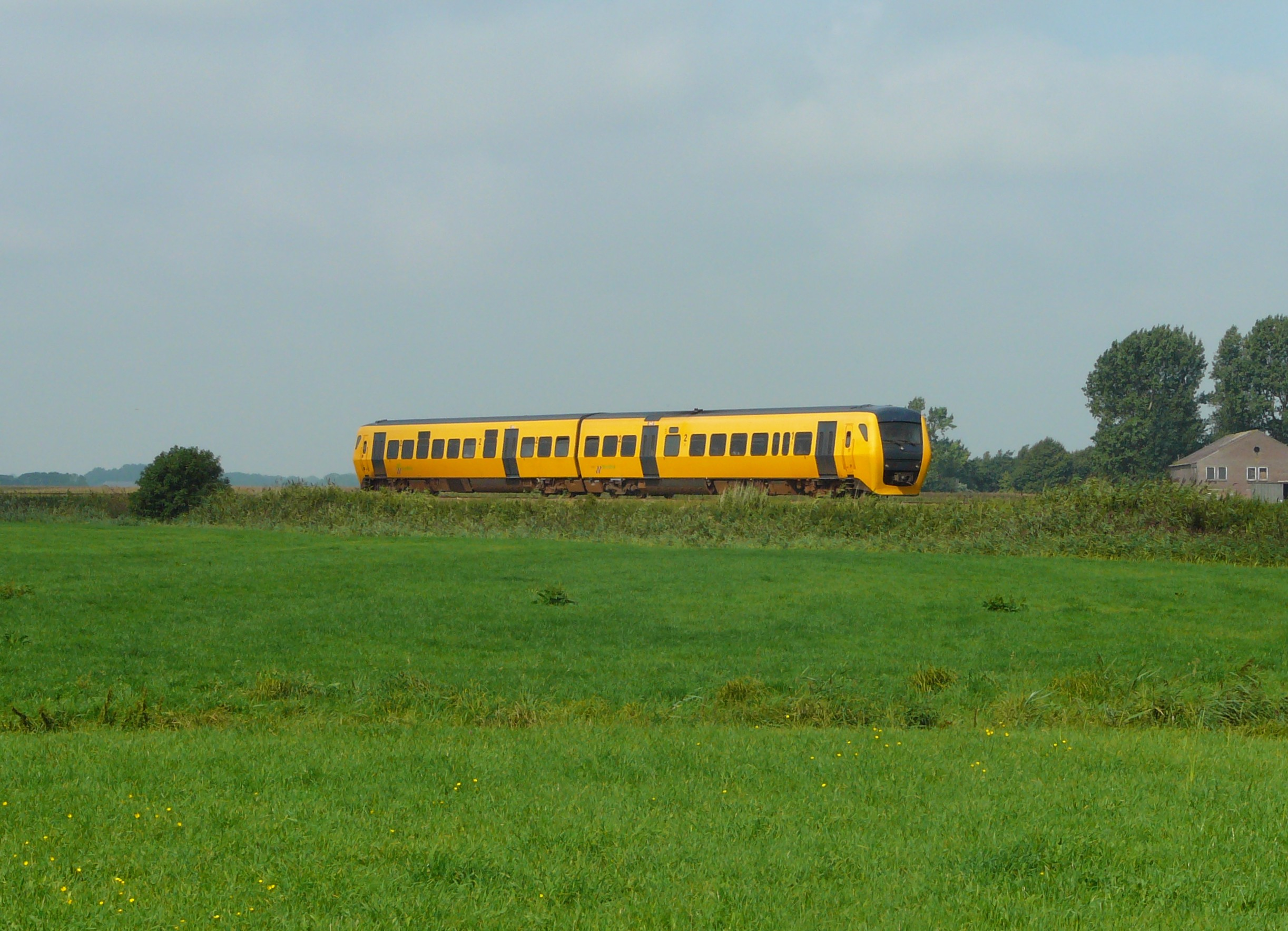
A NoordNed DM '90 at Dronrijp

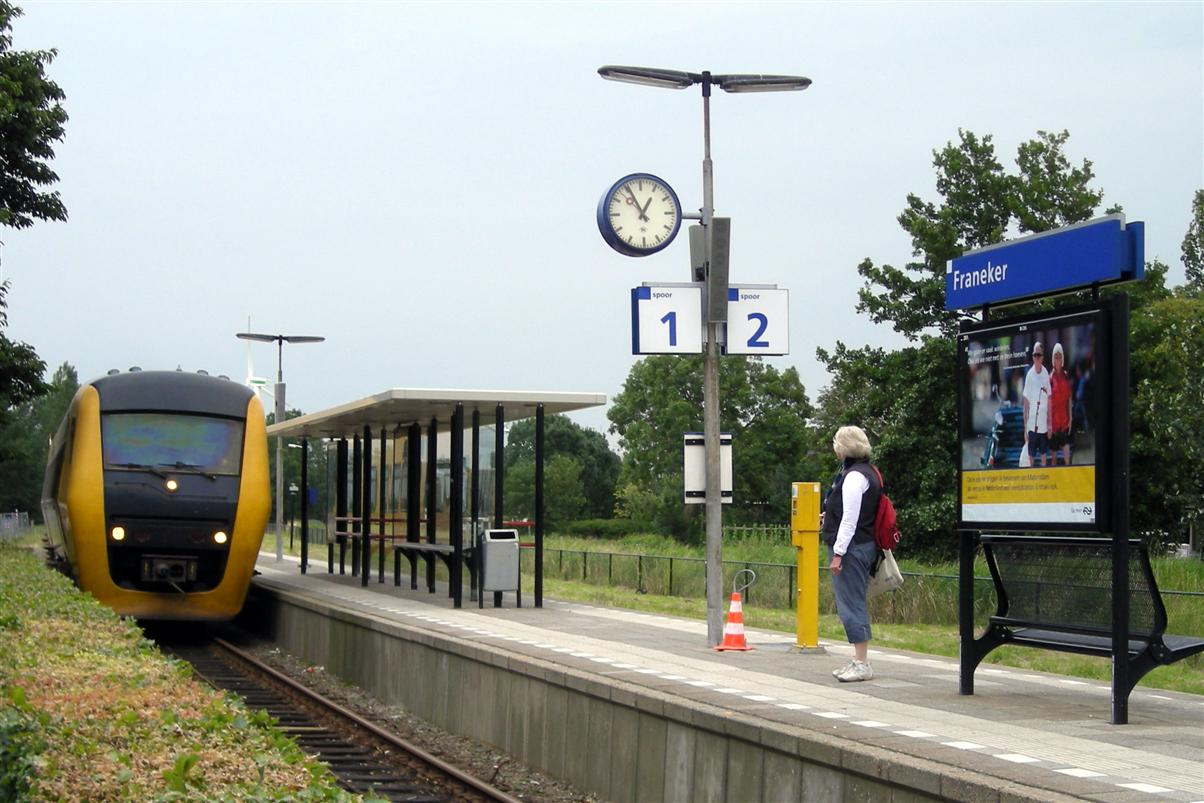
A NoordNed DM '90 arriving at Franeker

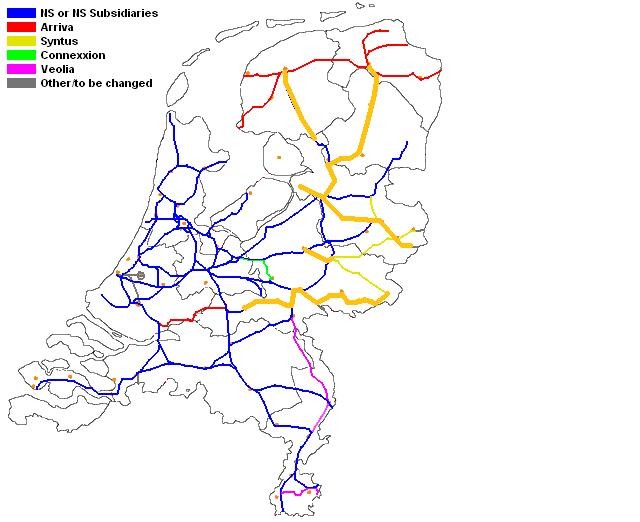
Routes where DM '90 can commonly be seen

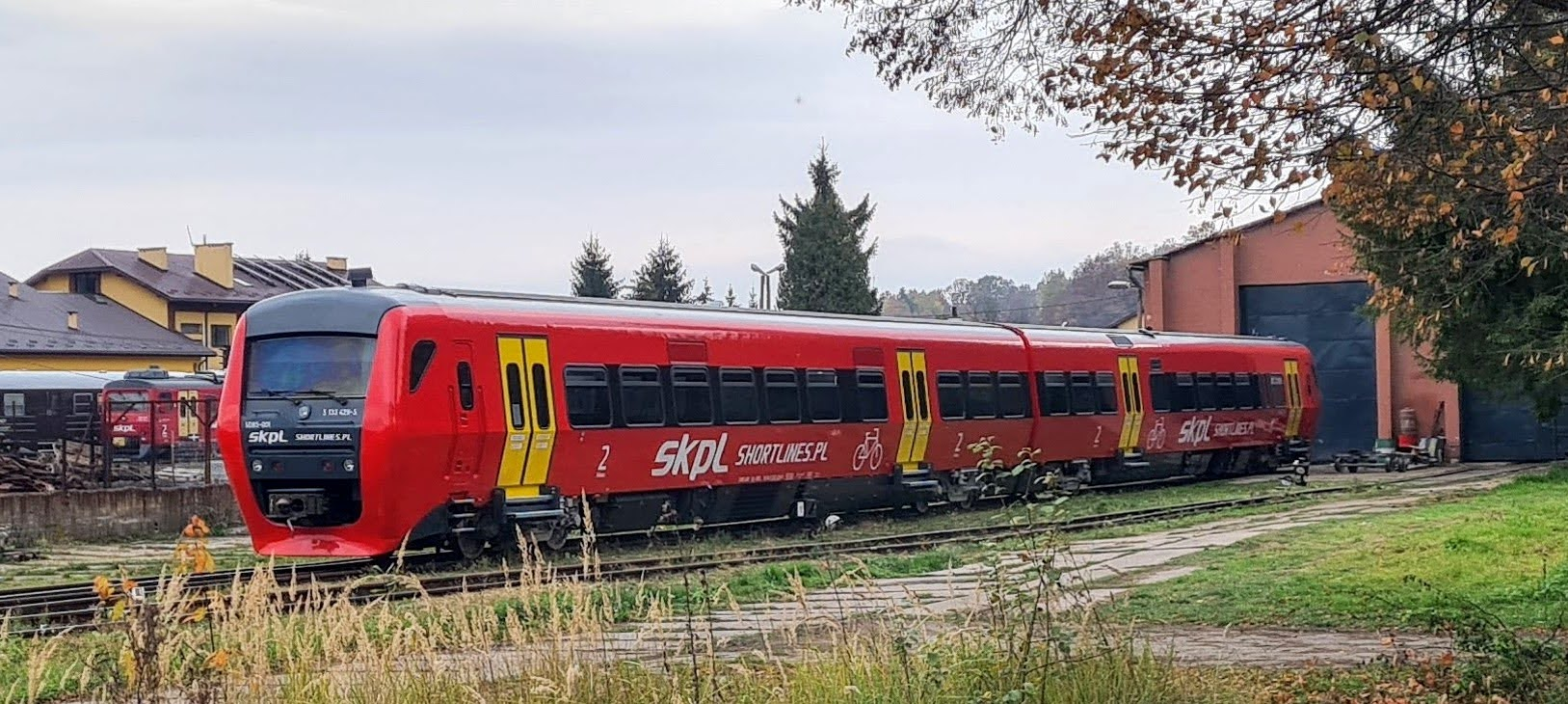
SD85 of SKPL in Zagórz, Poland
