= Zevenaar railway station =

Railway station located in Zevenaar, Netherlands

Zevenaar
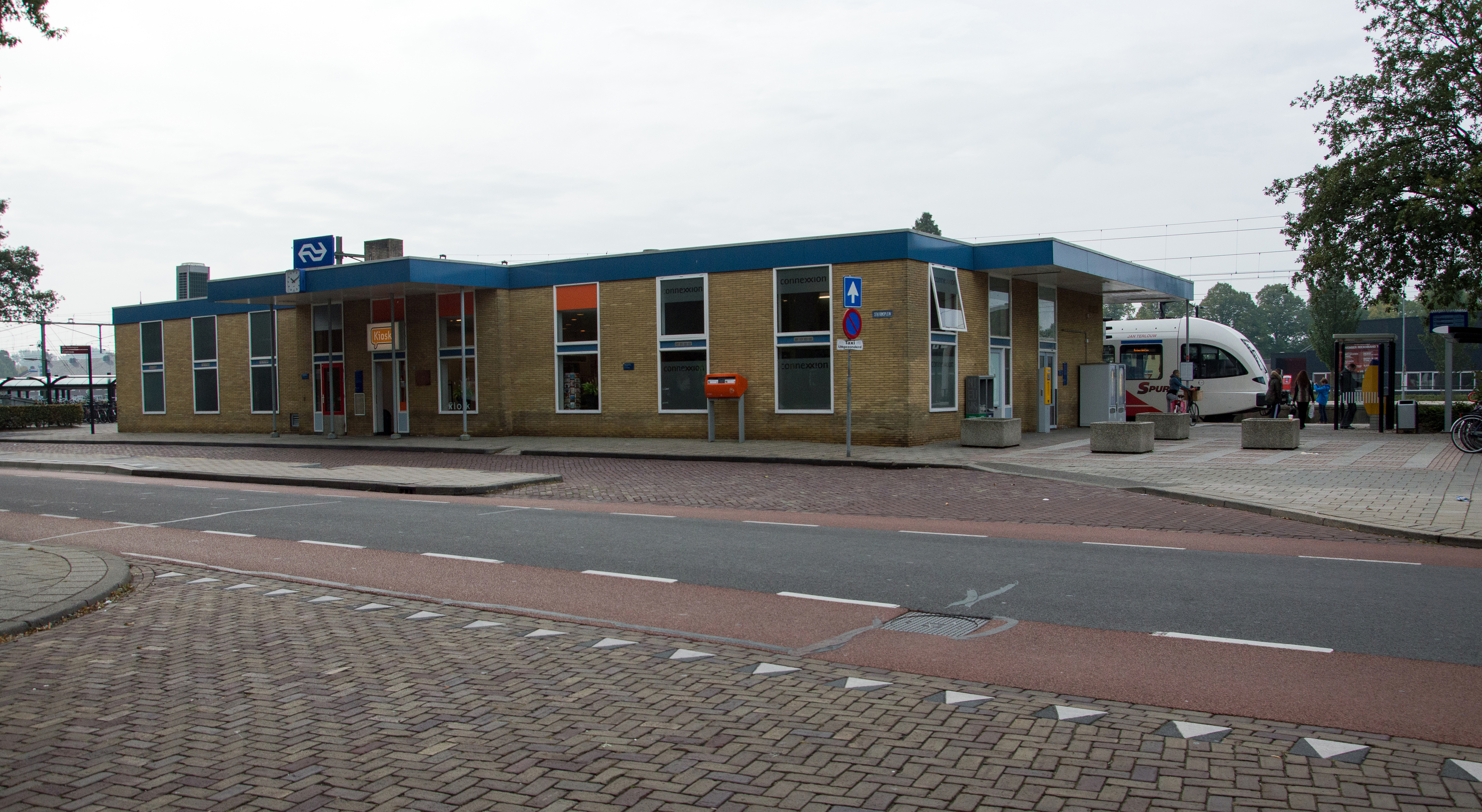
- Zevenaar railway station in 2013

General information
- Location: Netherlands
- Coordinates: 51°55′23″N 6°4′22″E
- Lines: Winterswijk–Zevenaar railway Oberhausen–Arnhem railway
- Platforms: 3

History
- Opened: 15 February 1856

Services
Preceding station	Breng	Following station
Duiven towards Arnhem Centraal	Breng Stoptrein 30700	Didam towards Doetinchem
Preceding station	Arriva Netherlands	Following station
Duiven towards Arnhem Centraal	Stoptrein 30900	Didam towards Winterswijk
Preceding station	VIAS	Following station
Arnhem Centraal Terminus	RE 19	Emmerich-Elten towards Düsseldorf Hbf
Location
- Location within Netherlands

Zevenaar is a railway station located in Zevenaar, Netherlands. The station was opened on 15 February 1856 and is located on the Winterswijk–Zevenaar railway and the Oberhausen–Arnhem railway. There used to be a connection to Kleve (Germany) as well (from 1865-1914). Since 6 April 2017, the station has a direct train to Germany once again, but this time to Düsseldorf instead of Kleve. The train services are operated by Arriva, Breng and Abellio Deutschland.

== Train services ==
Route	Service type	Operator	Notes
Arnhem - Doetinchem - Winterswijk	Local ("Sprinter")	Arriva	2x per hour (only 1x per hour after 20:00, on Saturday mornings and Sundays)
Arnhem - Doetinchem	Local ("Sprinter")	Breng	2x per hour - Mon-Fri only. Not on evenings.
Arnhem - Emmerich - Wesel - Oberhausen - Duisburg - Düsseldorf (Germany)	Regional Express (RE 19)	VIAS	1x per hour - one morning train and one evening train don't halt at Friedrichsfeld and Oberhausen-Holten

== Bus services ==
Line	Route	Operator	Notes
60	Arnhem CS - Westervoort - Duiven - Zevenaar - Babberich - Herwen - Lobith - Tolkamer	Breng, TCR (only a couple of runs)	On evenings, this bus does not operate between Zevenaar and Tolkamer. On Sundays, this bus only operates between Arnhem and Duiven.
555	Zevenaar Groot Holthuizen - Zevenaar Station - Pannerden - Aerdt	Breng	Rush hours only. During morning rush hour, this bus runs non-stop from Zevenaar to Aerdt, but does make all stops from Aerdt to Zevenaar. During afternoon rush hour, the same applies, but vice versa.
560	Zevenaar Ziekenhuis (Hospital) - Zevenaar Station - Pannerden - Aerdt - Herwen	Breng	Does not run after 20:30 and on weekends.
566	Zevenaar - Babberich - Elten (Germany) - Lobith - Tolkamer - Spijk	Breng	Semi-closed-door within Lobith and Tolkamer (i.e. boarding is only allowed if the destination is Elten, Spijk or Babberich and exiting is only allowed when travelling from Elten, Spijk or Babberich). Passengers wanting to travel locally in Lobith or Tolkamer or to/from Zevenaar must use route 60. Does not run after 20:30 and on weekends.
