= Didam railway station =

Railway station in the Netherlands

Didam
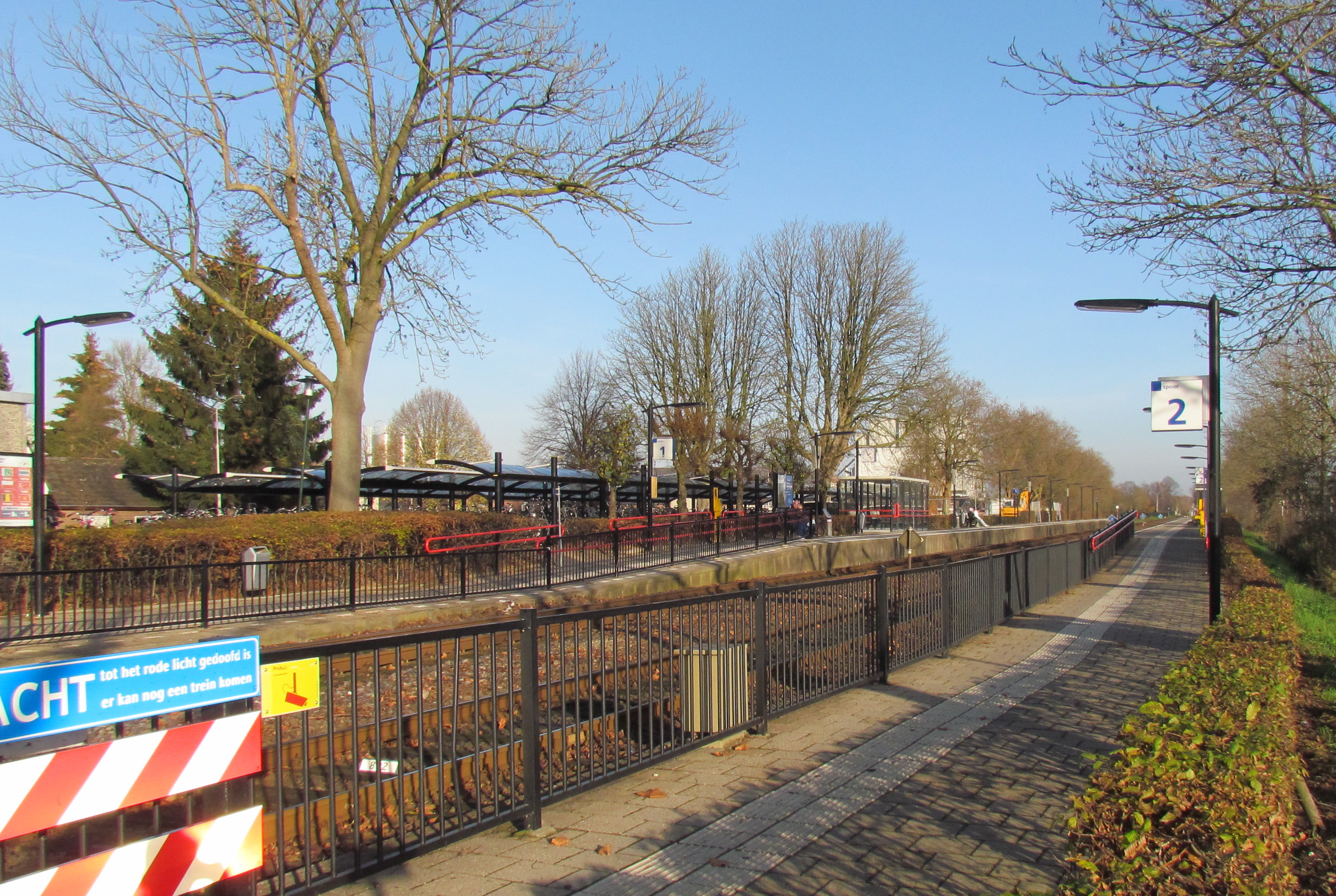

General information
- Location: Netherlands
- Coordinates: 51°56′00″N 6°07′56″E
- Line: Winterswijk–Zevenaar railway

History
- Opened: 1885

Services
Preceding station	Breng	Following station
Zevenaar towards Arnhem Centraal	Breng Stoptrein 30700	Wehl towards Doetinchem
Preceding station	Arriva Netherlands	Following station
Zevenaar towards Arnhem Centraal	Stoptrein 30900	Wehl towards Winterswijk
Location
- Location within Netherlands

Didam railway station is located in Didam, Netherlands. The station was opened on 15 July 1885 and is located on the Winterswijk–Zevenaar railway line. The station is operated by Arriva and Breng and they use trains with Diesel engines.

== Train services ==
Route	Service type	Operator	Notes
Arnhem - Doetinchem - Winterswijk	Local ("Sprinter")	Arriva	4x per hour (only 2x per hour after 20:00, on Saturday mornings and Sundays)
Arnhem - Doetinchem	Local ("Sprinter")	Breng	4x per hour - Mon-Fri only. Not on evenings.

== Bus services ==
Line	Route	Operator	Notes
196	's-Heerenberg - Stokkum - Beek - Loerbeek - Kilder - Wehl - Nieuw-Wehl - Loil - Didam - Nieuw-Dijk	Arriva	On evenings and weekends, this bus only operates when called one hour before its supposed departure ("belbus").
