= De Huet =

De Huet De Huut
- District of Doetinchem
- Interactive map of De Huet
- Country: Netherlands
- Province: Gelderland
- COROP: Achterhoek
- City: Doetinchem
- Time zone: UTC+1 (CET)
- Postal code: 7006

De Huet is a suburban district near the city of Doetinchem, mostly built in the 1980s and 1990s. The district is located south-west of the city centre, and south of the Oude IJssel river.

The residential district has a lot of greenery. Apart from that, the mall de Bongerd (roughly: the Orchard) is located within the district. De Bongerd includes community centre De Zuwe, a church De Wingerd (roughly: the Vineyard) and a former sports hall. There are also a multitude of shops throughout the district.

The district has a dedicated train station, where both Arriva and Breng operate trains in the directions of Winterswijk and Arnhem, Station Doetinchem De Huet.

== Gallery ==
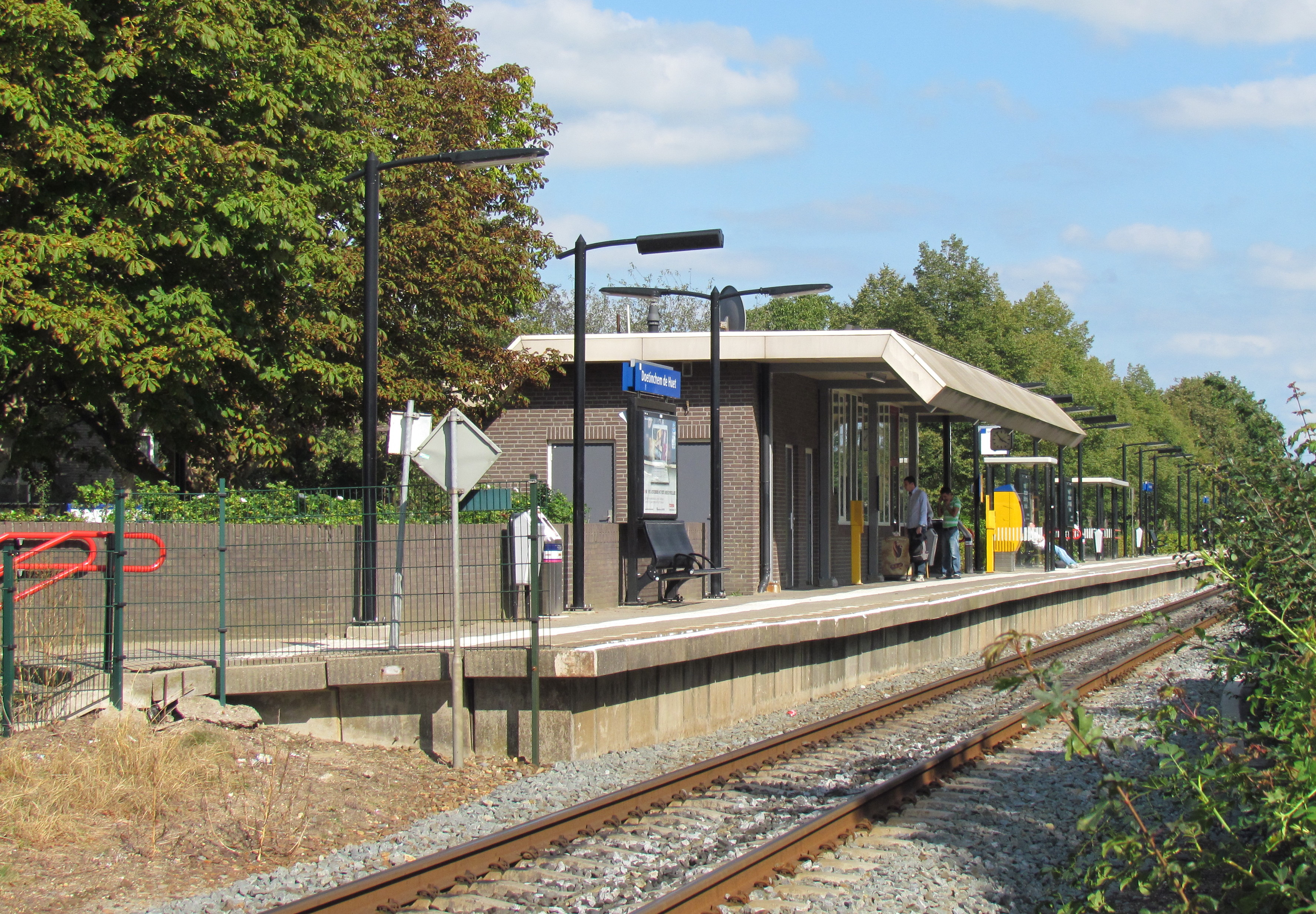
Station Doetinchem De Huet
