= Doetinchem De Huet railway station =

Railway station in the Netherlands

Doetinchem De Huet
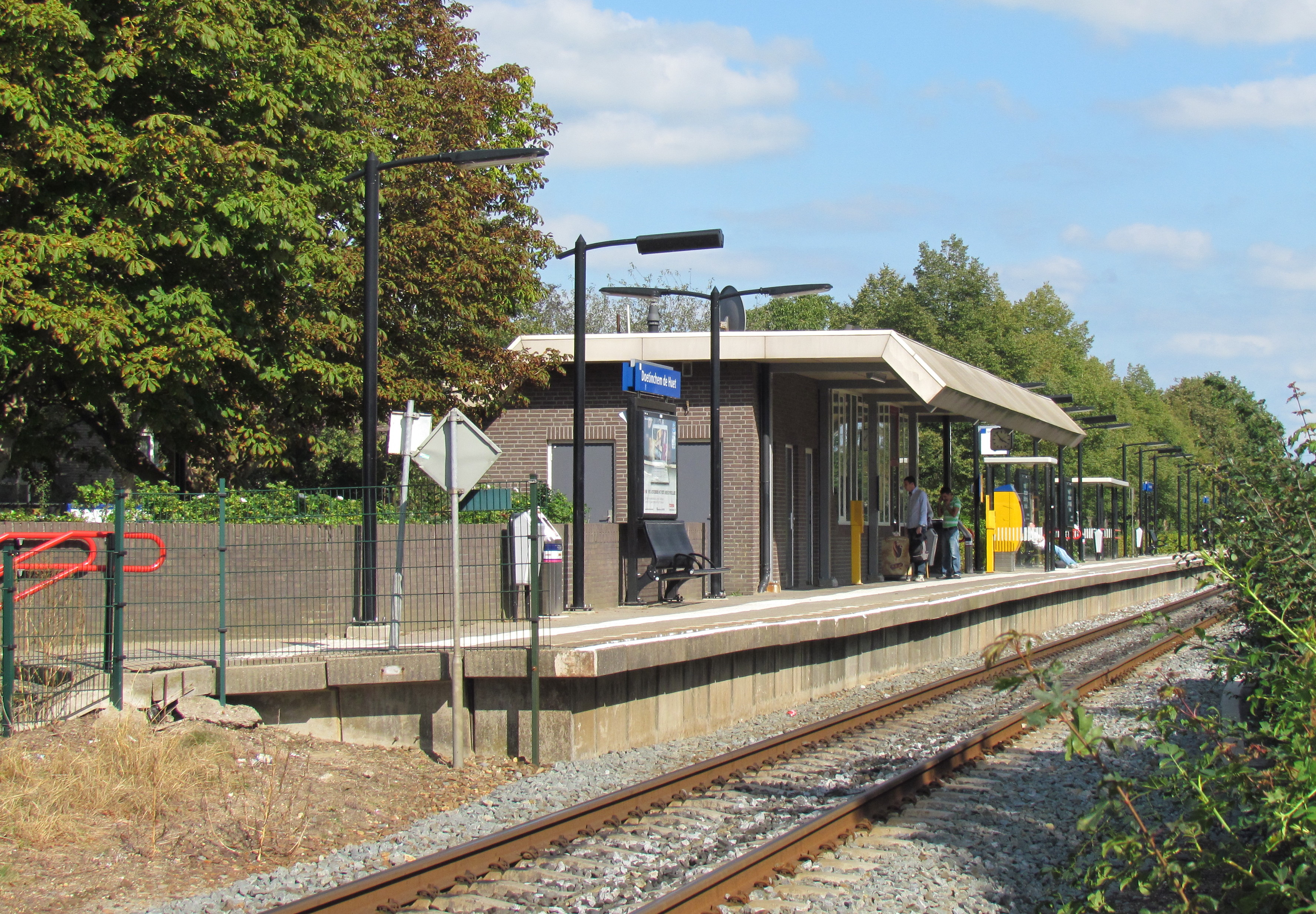

General information
- Location: Netherlands
- Coordinates: 51°57′33″N 6°15′37″E
- Line: Winterswijk–Zevenaar railway

History
- Opened: 1985

Services
Preceding station	Breng	Following station
Wehl towards Arnhem Centraal	Breng Stoptrein 30700	Doetinchem Terminus
Preceding station	Arriva Netherlands	Following station
Wehl towards Arnhem Centraal	Stoptrein 30900	Doetinchem towards Winterswijk
Location
- Location within Netherlands

Doetinchem De Huet is a railway station located in western Doetinchem, Netherlands. The station lies between the quarters De Huet and Dichteren. The station was opened on 2 June 1985 as a replacement for the previous station Doetinchem West (earlier: Doetinchem-Wijnbergen (1885–1965)), which was open from 1885 to 1985. It's located on the Winterswijk–Zevenaar railway. Train services are operated by Arriva and Breng. In a Railpro survey in 2005 there were approximately 1,232 passengers per day using Doetinchem De Huet station.

== Train services ==
Route	Service type	Operator	Notes
Arnhem – Doetinchem – Winterswijk	Local ("Sprinter")	Arriva	2x per hour (only 1x per hour after 20:00, on Saturday mornings and Sundays)
Arnhem – Doetinchem	Local ("Sprinter")	Breng	2x per hour – Mon-Fri only. Not on evenings.

== Bus services ==
Line	Route	Operator	Notes
1	Doetinchem Station – Overstegen – Slingeland Ziekenhuis (Hospital) – Centrum (Downtown) – Dichteren – De Huet	Arriva	Mon-Fri during daytime hours only.
