= Wehl railway station =

Railway station in the Netherlands

Wehl
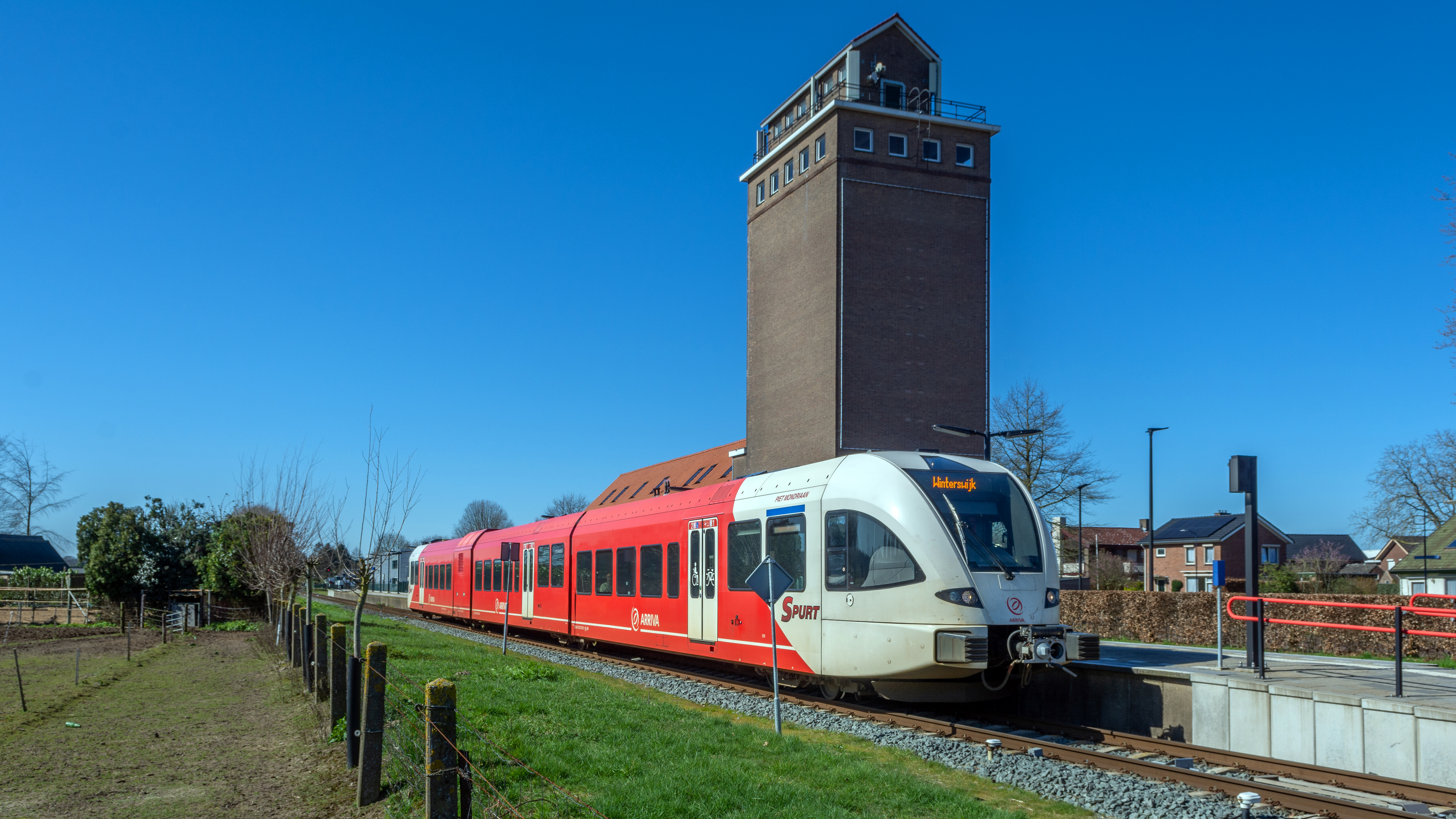
- Wehl railway station in 2020

General information
- Location: Netherlands
- Coordinates: 51°57′24″N 6°12′45″E
- Line: Winterswijk–Zevenaar railway
- Platforms: 1
- Tracks: 2

History
- Opened: 15 July 1885

Passengers
- 592 per day (2005)

Services
Preceding station	Breng	Following station
Didam towards Arnhem Centraal	Breng Stoptrein 30700	Doetinchem De Huet towards Doetinchem
Preceding station	Arriva Netherlands	Following station
Didam towards Arnhem Centraal	Stoptrein 30900	Doetinchem De Huet towards Winterswijk
Location
- Location within Netherlands

Wehl is a railway station located in Wehl, Netherlands. The station was opened in 15 July 1885 and is located on the Winterswijk–Zevenaar railway. The train services are operated by Arriva and Breng.

== Train services ==
Route	Service type	Operator	Notes
Arnhem - Doetinchem - Winterswijk	Local ("Sprinter")	Arriva	2x per hour (only 1x per hour after 20:00, on Saturday mornings and Sundays)
Arnhem - Doetinchem	Local ("Sprinter")	Breng	2x per hour - Mon-Fri only. Not on evenings.

== Bus services ==
Line	Route	Operator	Notes
196	's-Heerenberg - Stokkum - Beek - Loerbeek - Kilder - Wehl - Nieuw-Wehl - Loil - Didam - Nieuw Dijk	Arriva	On evenings and weekends, this bus only operates when called one hour before its supposed departure ("belbus").

== Other features ==
The station also has bike sheds, parking, and bike lockers.

=== Controversy ===
The Station's name was initially German, much to the chagrin of the locals. When the station was opened in 1885, Wehl citizens protested, and the name was changed to dutch.
