= Gaanderen =

- Village
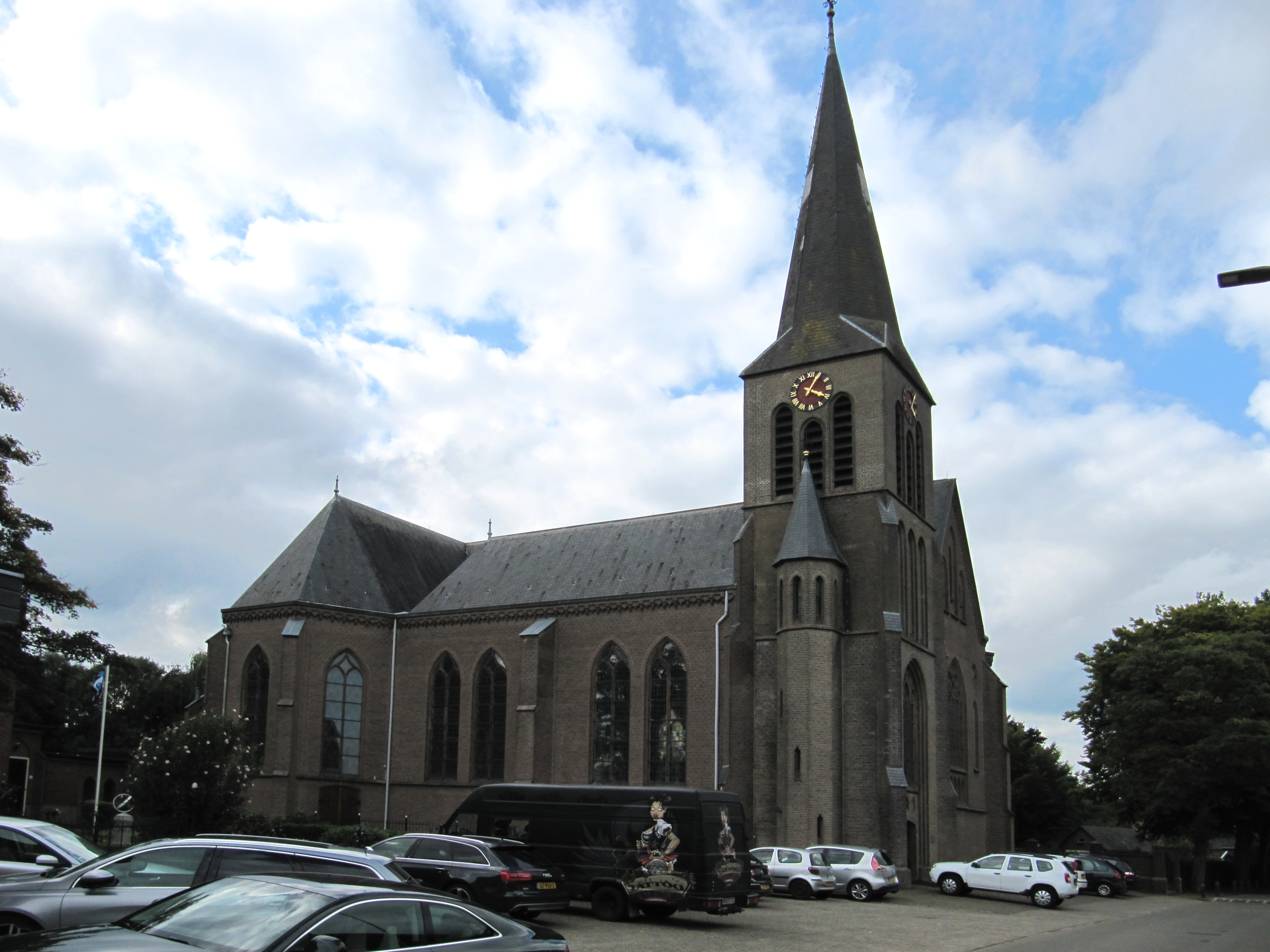
- The church in Gaanderen

- Location in the province of Gelderland in the Netherlands Gaanderen (Netherlands)
- Coordinates: 51°55′41″N 6°20′41″E
- Country: Netherlands
- Province: Gelderland
- Municipality: Doetinchem

Area
  - Total: 9.15 km^{2} (3.53 sq mi)
- Elevation: 15 m (49 ft)

Population (2021)
  - Total: 5,575
  - Density: 609/km^{2} (1,580/sq mi)
- Time zone: UTC+1 (CET)
  - Summer (DST): UTC+2 (CEST)
- Postal code: 7011
- Dialing code: 0315

Gaanderen is a village in the Dutch province of Gelderland. It is located in the municipality of Doetinchem. The number of inhabitants is around 5,575 (2020).

It was first mentioned around 1200 as de Gernere, and means "tapering land on a sandy ridge".

Gaanderen was home to 482 people in 1840. The St Martinus Church dates from 1913 and is a replacement of a 1854 church. The tower of the old church remained.

== Transportation ==
- Railway Station: Gaanderen
- Rijksweg Doetinchem - Terborg

== Gallery ==
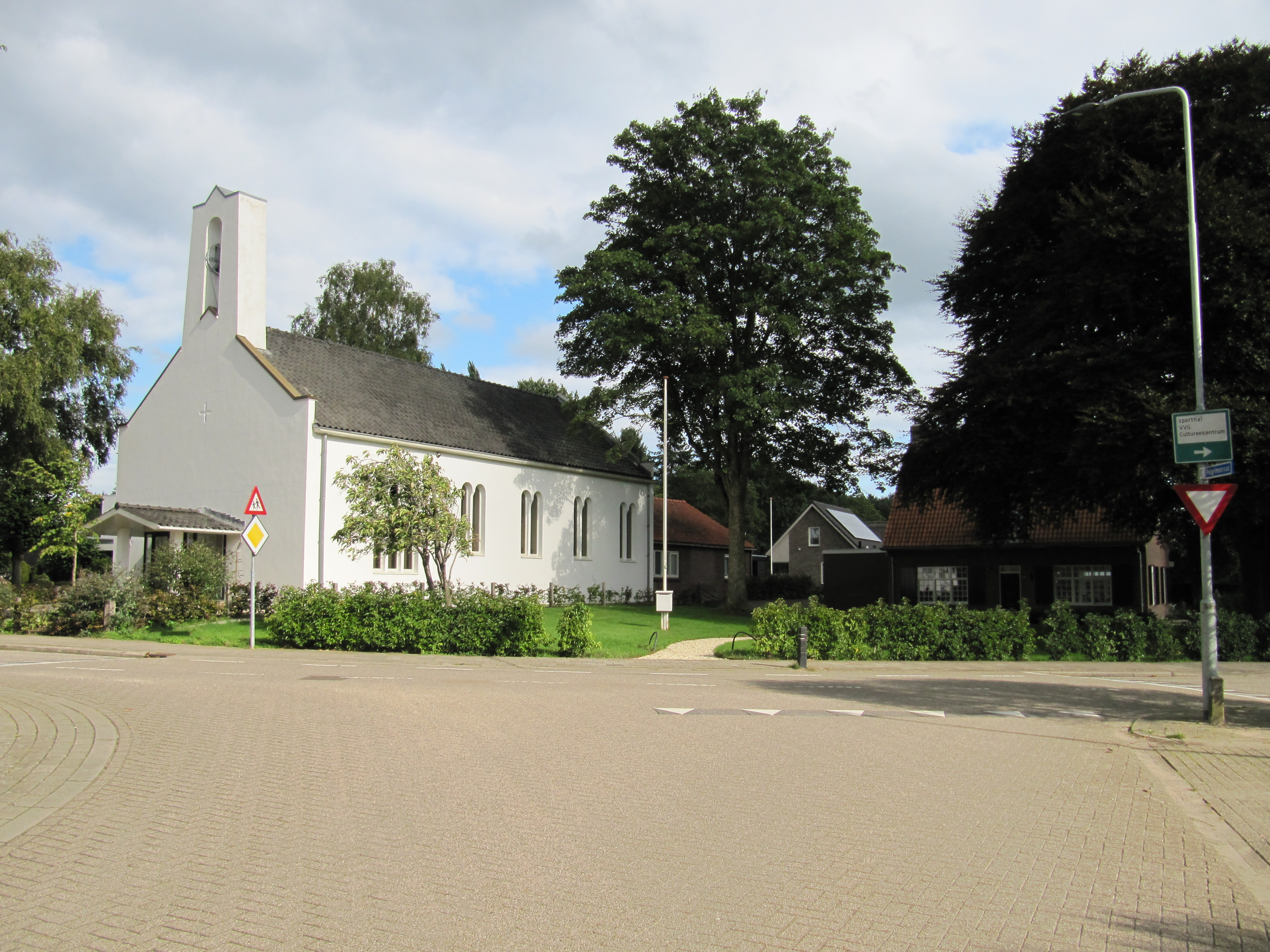
Hoofdstraat 62, church

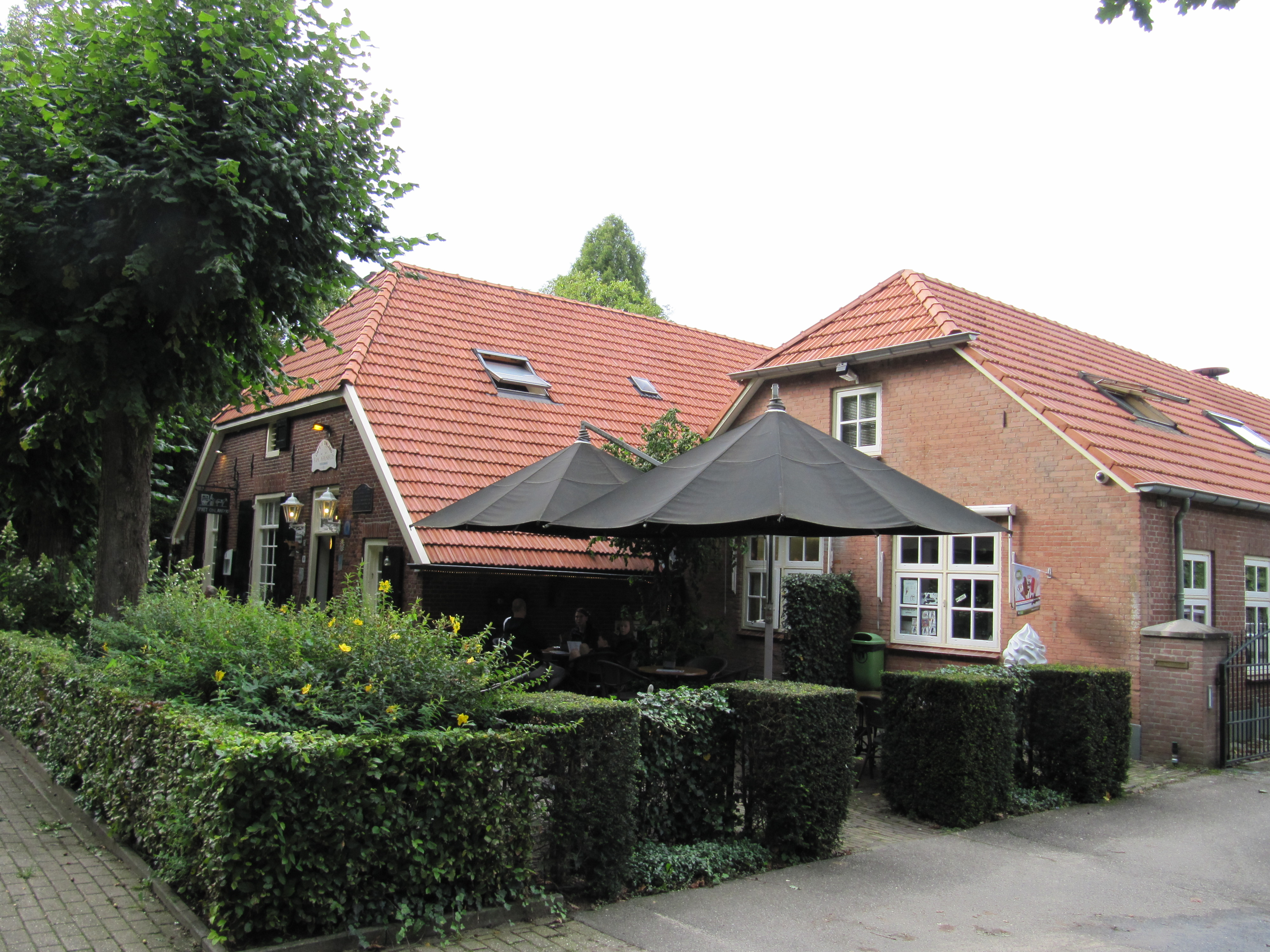
Rekhemseweg 175

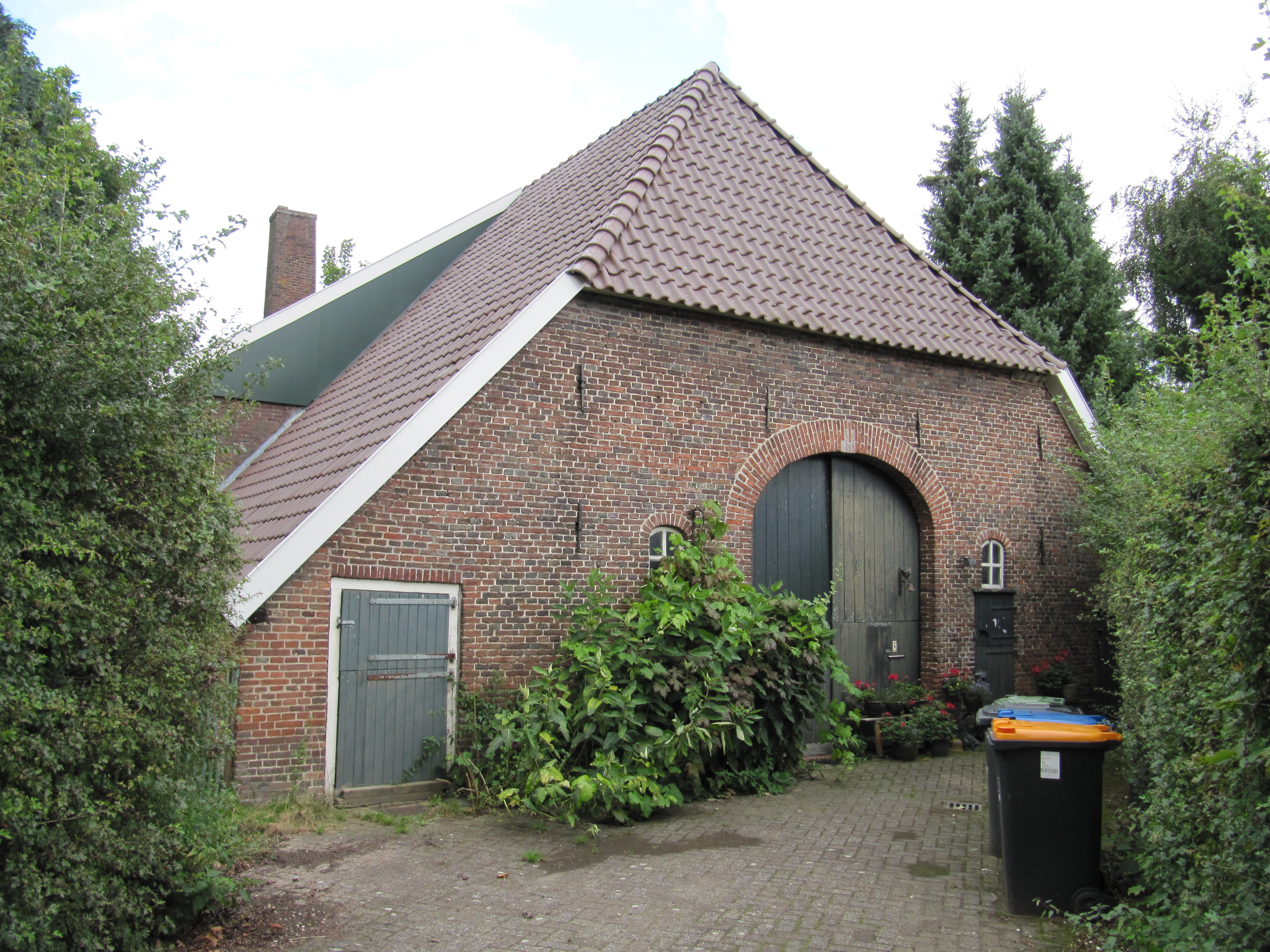
Kerkstraat 45

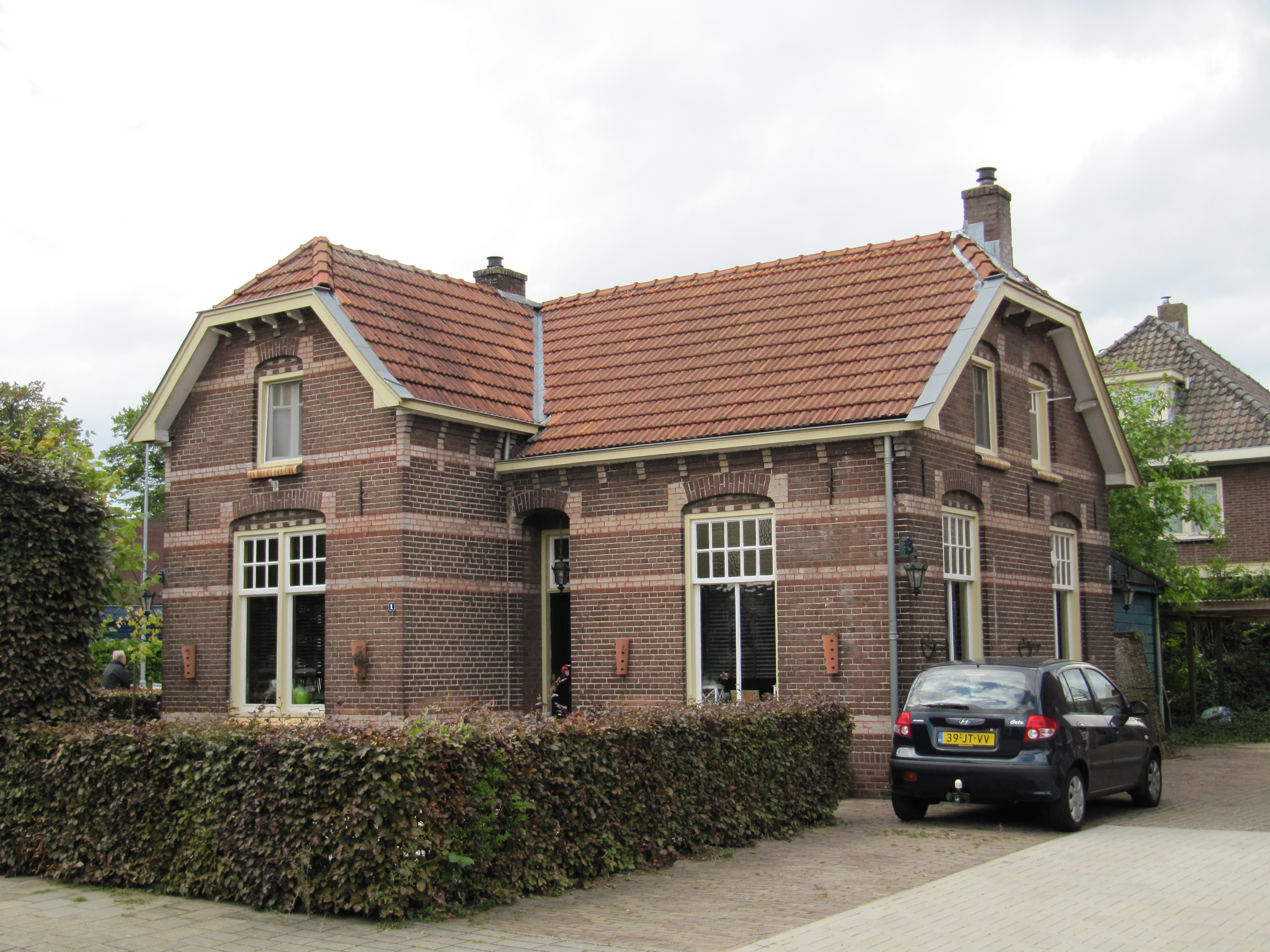
Bloemenweg 1

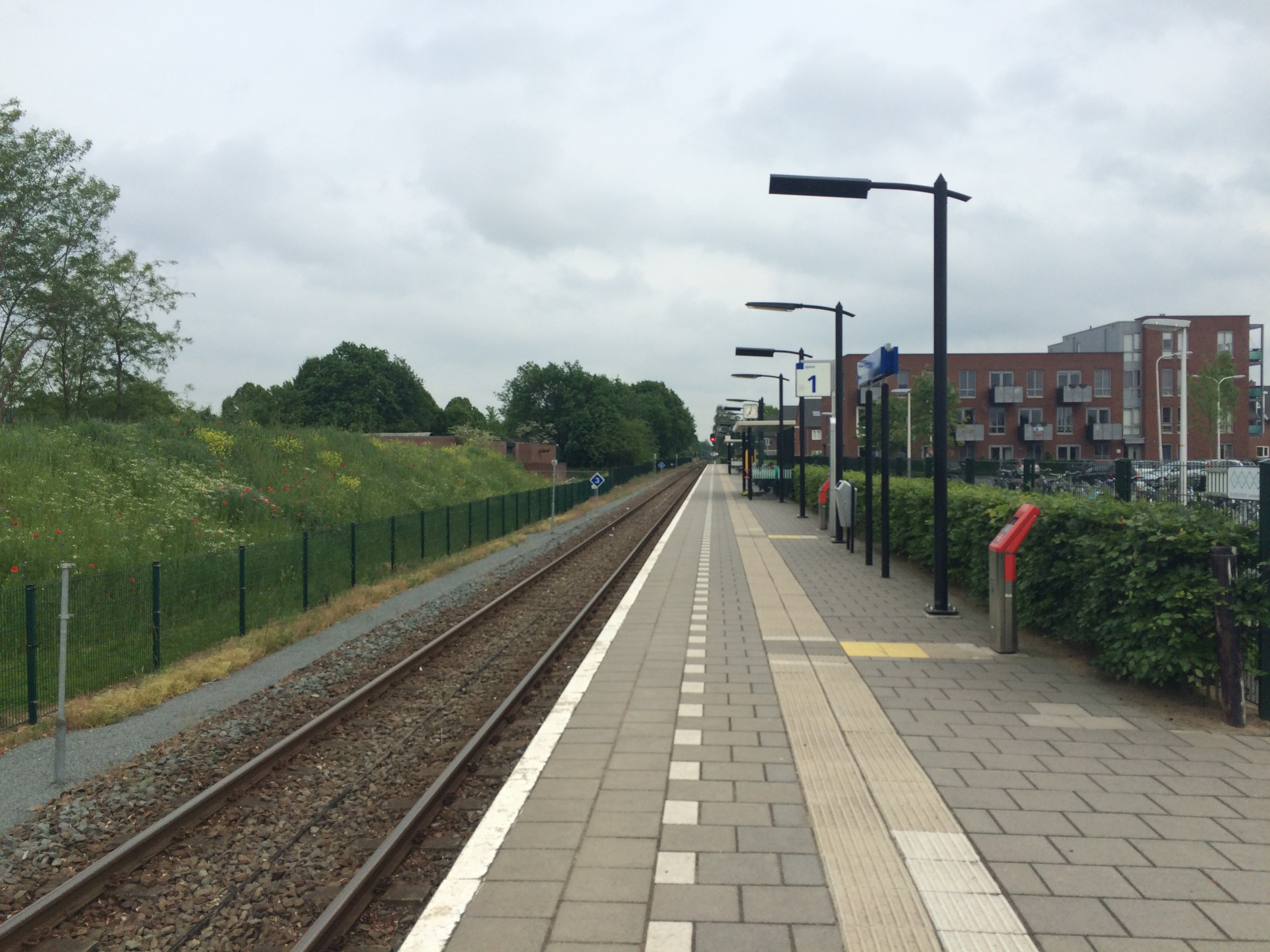
Station Gaanderen
