= Gaanderen railway station =

Railway station in Gelderland, Netherlands

Gaanderen
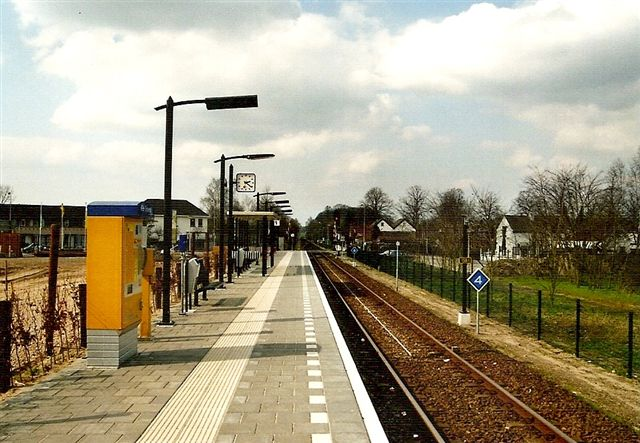

General information
- Location: Netherlands
- Coordinates: 51°55′51″N 6°20′52″E
- Line: Winterswijk–Zevenaar railway

History
- Opened: 2006

Services
Preceding station	Arriva Netherlands	Following station
Doetinchem towards Arnhem Centraal	Stoptrein 30900	Terborg towards Winterswijk
Location
- Location within Netherlands

Gaanderen is a railway station located in Gaanderen, Netherlands. The station was opened on 10 December 2006 and is located on the Winterswijk–Zevenaar railway. The train services are operated by Arriva.

== Train services ==
Route	Service type	Operator	Notes
Arnhem - Doetinchem - Winterswijk	Local ("Sprinter")	Arriva	2x per hour (only 1x per hour after 20:00, on Saturday mornings and Sundays)

== Bus services ==
There is no bus service to and from this station as the station was built at the expense of the bus line through Gaanderen. At the time of creation, locals considered the station unnecessary since Terborg station is just outside Gaanderen. Today, however, buses still run through Gaanderen, namely Line 40 on the Doetinchem Station - Dinxperlo route. The nearest bus stop is Gaanderen, Winkelcentrum, which is 500m away.
