= Varsseveld railway station =

Railway station in the Netherlands

Varsseveld
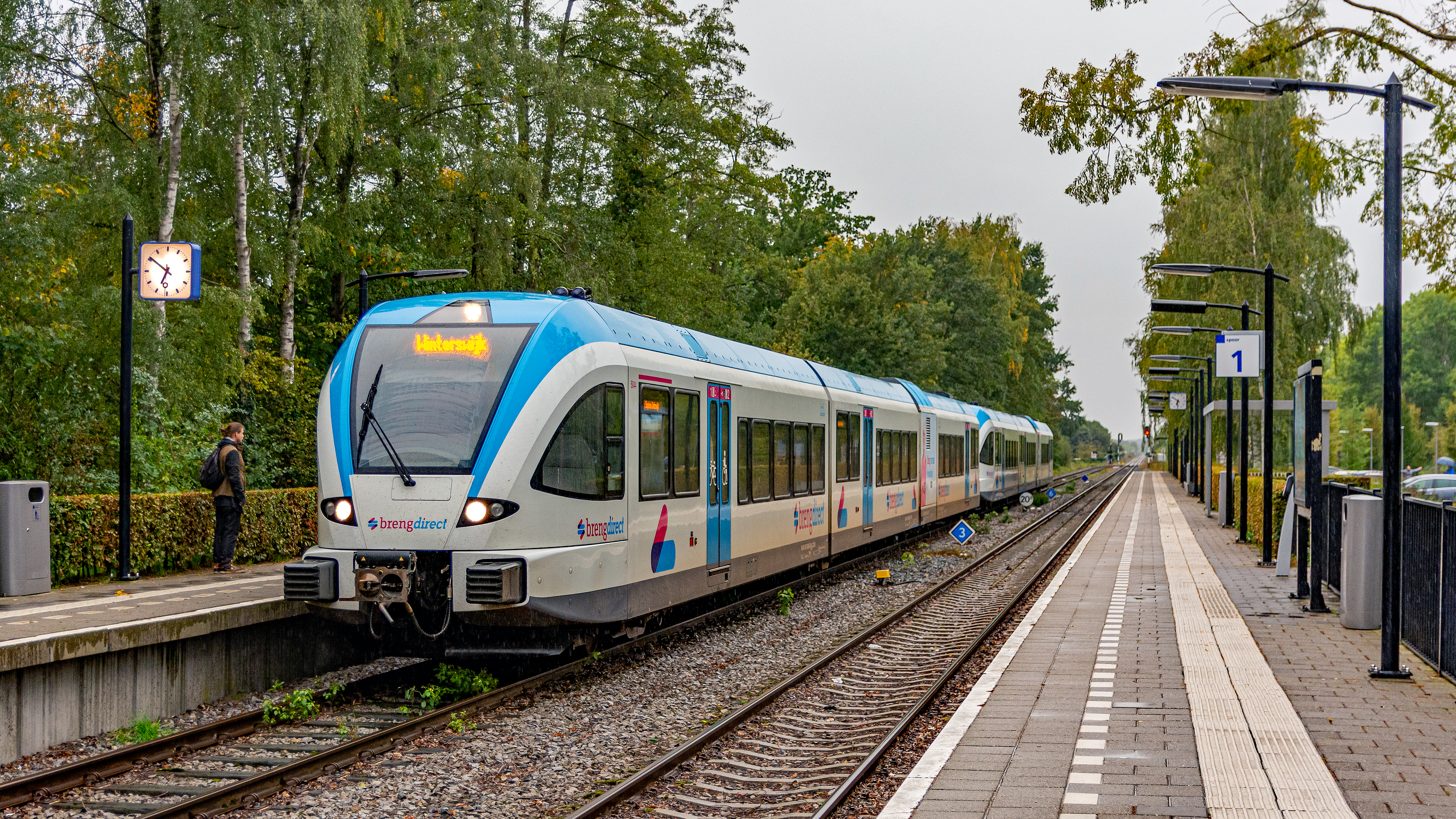
- Varsseveld railway station in 2019

General information
- Location: Netherlands
- Coordinates: 51°56′13″N 6°27′29″E
- Line: Winterswijk–Zevenaar railway

History
- Opened: 15 July 1885

Services
Preceding station	Arriva Netherlands	Following station
Terborg towards Arnhem Centraal	Stoptrein 30900	Aalten towards Winterswijk
Location
- Location within Netherlands

Varsseveld is a railway station located in Varsseveld, Netherlands. The station was opened on 15 July 1885 and is located on the Winterswijk–Zevenaar railway. The train services are operated by Arriva. Varsseveld was once a junction, where the railway branch to Dinxperlo started, but that line has been closed and demolished since 1935.

== Train services ==
Route	Service type	Operator	Notes
Arnhem - Doetinchem - Winterswijk	Local ("Sprinter")	Arriva	2x per hour (only 1x per hour after 20:00, on Saturday mornings and Sundays)

== Bus services ==
Line	Route	Operator	Notes
74	Doetinchem - Westendorp - Varsseveld - Harreveld - Lichtenvoorde - Groenlo - Eibergen - Haaksbergen - Enschede	Gelderesch and Arriva	On evenings and weekends, this bus only operates between Varsseveld and Haaksbergen.
174	Varsseveld - Westendorp	Arriva	Only runs on evenings and weekends.
194	Aalten - Lintelo - De Heurne - Dinxperlo - Breedenbroek - Sinderen - Varsseveld - Halle - Zelhem	Arriva	On evenings and weekends, this bus only operates if called one hour before its supposed departure ("belbus").
