= Terborg railway station =

Railway station in the Netherlands

Terborg
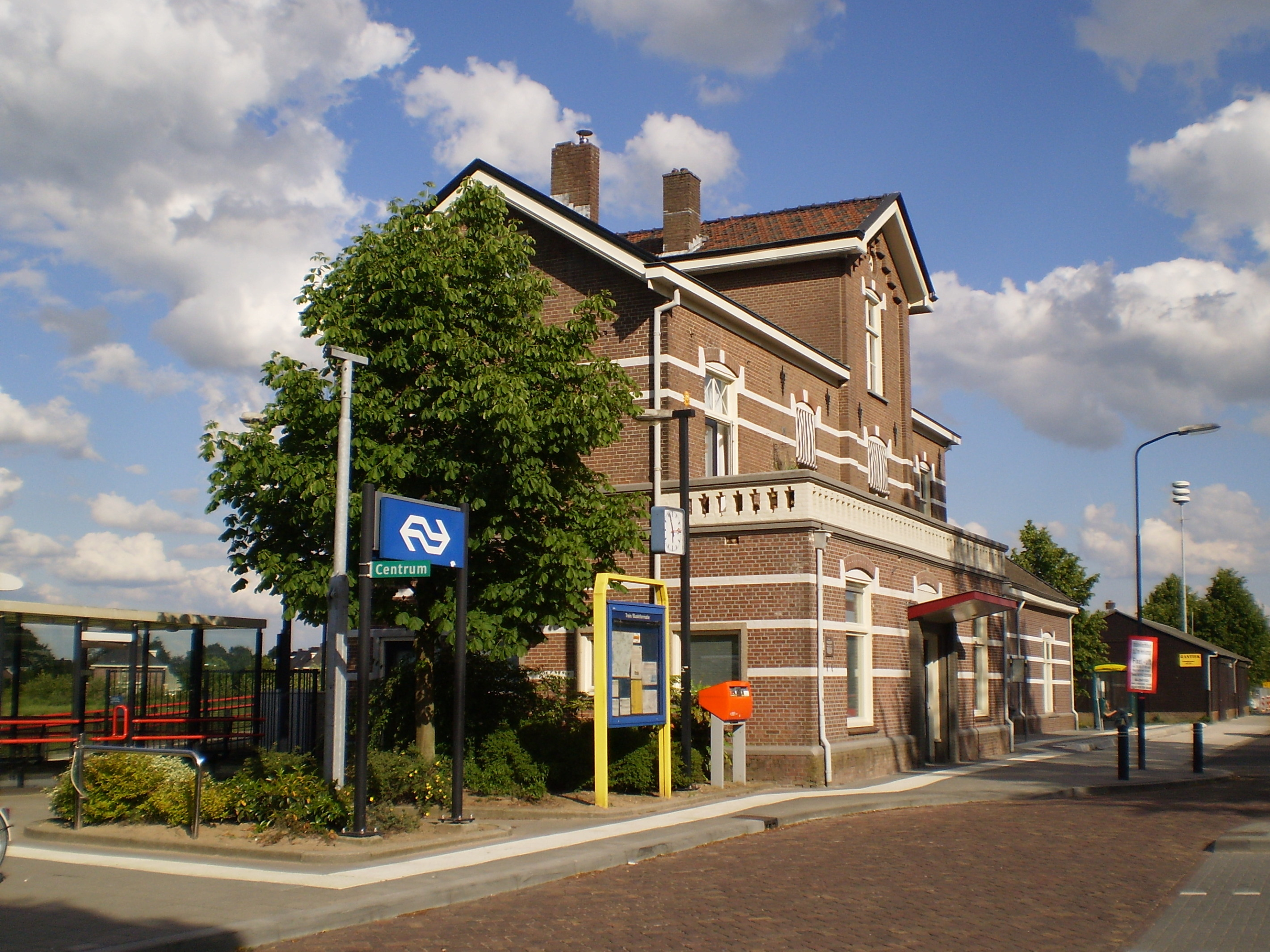
- Terborg railway station

General information
- Location: Terborg, Gelderland; Netherlands
- Coordinates: 51°55′20″N 6°21′53″E
- Owner: Nederlandse Spoorwegen
- Line: Winterswijk–Zevenaar railway
- Platforms: 1
- Tracks: 2

History
- Opened: 15 July 1885

Passengers
- 2005: 885 per day

Services
| Preceding station | Arriva Netherlands | Following station |
|---|---|---|
| Gaanderen towards Arnhem Centraal | Stoptrein 30900 | Varsseveld towards Winterswijk |
Location
- Location within Netherlands

Terborg is a railway station in Terborg, Netherlands. The station was opened on 15 July 1885 and is located on the Winterswijk–Zevenaar railway. The train services are operated by Arriva.

== Train services ==
| Route | Service type | Operator | Notes |
|---|---|---|---|
| Arnhem - Doetinchem - Winterswijk | Local ("Sprinter") | Arriva | 2x per hour (only 1x per hour after 20:00, on Saturday mornings and Sundays) |

== Bus services ==
| Line | Route | Operator | Notes |
|---|---|---|---|
| 40 | Doetinchem - Gaanderen - Terborg - Silvolde - Kroezenhoek - Breedenbroek - Dinxperlo | Arriva | On weekday evenings, this bus only operates between Terborg and Dinxperlo. |
| 195 | Terborg - Etten - Ulft - Gendringen - Megchelen | Arriva | On evenings and weekends, this bus only operated if called one hour before its supposed departure ("belbus") and only operates between Ulft and Megchelen. |
| 197 | 's-Heerenberg - Lengel - Azewijn - Varsselder - Ulft - Bontebrug - Silvolde - Terborg | Arriva | On evenings and weekends, this bus only operated if called one hour before its supposed departure ("belbus") and only operates between 's Heerenberg and Ulft. |
| 890 | Terborg - Silvolde - Etten - Ulft - Gendringen | Arriva | Only runs on weekdays evenings. The bus is always stand-by on Terborg Station and can be entered freely, but needs to be called one hour before its supposed departure ("belbus") when one wants to depart from another bus stop. |
