= Doetinchem railway station =

Railway station in the Netherlands

Doetinchem
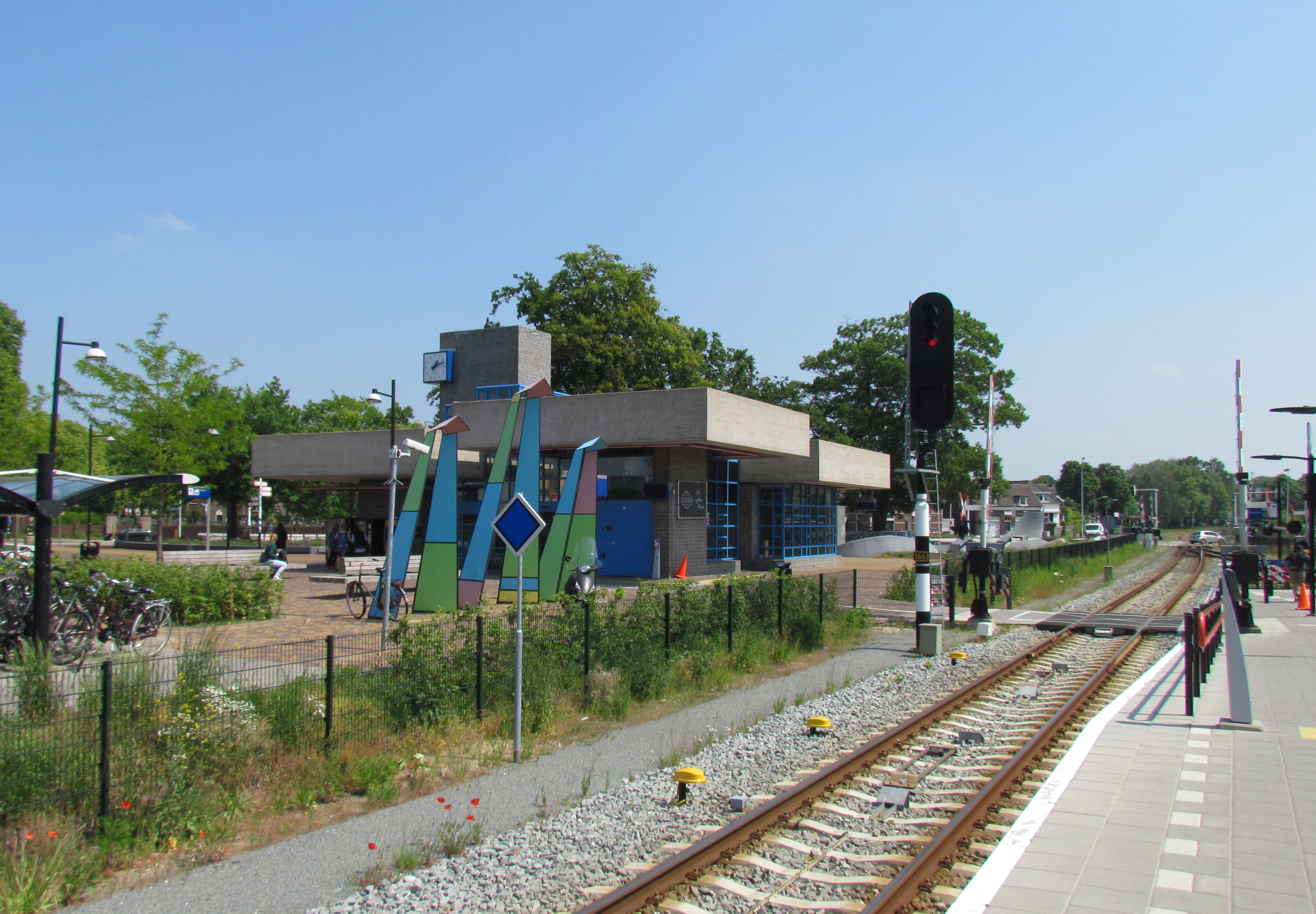

General information
- Location: Netherlands
- Coordinates: 51°57′30″N 6°17′43″E
- Line: Winterswijk–Zevenaar railway

History
- Opened: 1885

Services
Preceding station	Breng	Following station
Doetinchem De Huet towards Arnhem Centraal	Breng Stoptrein 30700	Terminus
Preceding station	Arriva Netherlands	Following station
Doetinchem De Huet towards Arnhem Centraal	Stoptrein 30900	Gaanderen towards Winterswijk
Location
- Location within Netherlands

Doetinchem is a railway station located in Doetinchem, Netherlands. The station was opened on 15 July 1885 and is located on the Winterswijk–Zevenaar railway. The station is operated by Arriva and Breng. In Doetinchem there is also Doetinchem De Huet railway station to the west of this station. From 1885 to 1937, it was also the start of the branch to Ruurlo. From Doetinchem station it is a 10-minute walk north to the town centre. In a Railpro survey in 2005, there were approximately 3590 passengers per day using Doetinchem station.

== Train services ==
Route	Service type	Operator	Notes
Arnhem - Doetinchem - Winterswijk	Local ("Sprinter")	Arriva	2x per hour (only 1x per hour after 20:00, on Saturday mornings and Sundays)
Arnhem - Doetinchem	Local ("Sprinter")	Breng	2x per hour - Mon-Fri only. Not on evenings.

== Bus services ==
Line	Route	Operator	Notes
1	Doetinchem Station - Overstegen - Slingeland Ziekenhuis (Hospital) - Centrum (Downtown) - Dichteren - De Huet	Arriva	Mon-Fri during daytime hours only.
2	Doetinchem Station - Centrum (Downtown) - Slingeland Ziekenhuis (Hospital)	Arriva	Mon-Fri during daytime hours only (except morning rush hour).
23	Borculo - Ruurlo - Veldhoek - Wolfersveen - Zelhem - Doetinchem	Arriva	
24	Doetinchem - Braamt - Zeddam - 's-Heerenberg	Arriva	
27	Arnhem Centraal - Arnhem Velperpoort - Arnhem Presikhaaf - Velp Zuid - Lathum - Giesbeek - Angerlo - Doesburg - Drempt - Hoog-Keppel - Laag-Keppel - Doetinchem	Arriva, Breng and TCR (only a couple of runs)	
28	Doetinchem - Etten - Ulft - Gendringen	Arriva	
29	Arnhem Centraal - Arnhem Velperpoort - Velp - Rheden - Doesburg - Drempt - Hoog-Keppel - Laag-Keppel - Doetinchem	Arriva, Breng and TCR (only a couple of runs)	Not on evenings and weekends.
40	Doetinchem - Gaanderen - Terborg - Silvolde - Kroezenhoek - Breedenbroek - Dinxperlo	Arriva	Connects in Dinxperlo to line C7 to Bocholt (Germany).
51	Doetinchem - Velswijk - Keijenborg - Hengelo - Vorden	Arriva	
74	Doetinchem - Westendorp - Varsseveld - Harreveld - Lichtenvoorde - Groenlo - Eibergen - Haaksbergen - Enschede	Gelderesch, Arriva	On evenings and weekends, this bus only operates between Varsseveld and Haaksbergen.
82	Doetinchem - Langerak - Laag-Keppel - Hummelo - Toldijk - Steenderen - Baak - Warnsveld - Zutphen	Arriva	
612	Doetinchem Station - Sportpark Zuid	Arriva	Rush hours only, with one extra run sometime during off-peak.
623	Borculo → Ruurlo → Veldhoek → Wolfersveen → Zelhem → Doetinchem	Arriva	Morning rush hour only.
627	Giesbeek → Angerlo → Doesburg → Drempt → Keppel → Doetinchem	Berkhout Reizen	Morning rush hour only.
628	Dinxperlo → Breedenbroek → Gendringen → Ulft → Etten → Doetinchem	Arriva	1 run during morning rush hour only.
651	Lochem → Vorden → Hengelo → Velswijk → Doetinchem	Berkhout Reizen	Morning rush hour only.
656	Doetinchem - Velswijk - Hengelo - Zutphen - Voorst - Apeldoorn Jacobus Fruytierschool	Gebo Tours, Oude Wesselink	1 run during both rush hours only. On special occasions, the afternoon rush hour run is replaced by a run at noon.
682	Zutphen - Warnsveld - Baak - Steenderen - Toldijk - Hummelo - Laag-Keppel - Langerak - Doetinchem	Arriva	1 run during morning rush hour only (in both directions).
