= Doetinchem Centrum =

Stadscentrum Doetinchem Centrum
- District of Doetinchem
- Interactive map of Stadscentrum Doetinchem
- Country: Netherlands
- Province: Gelderland
- COROP: Achterhoek
- City: Doetinchem
- Time zone: UTC+1 (CET)
- Postal code: 7001

Doetinchem Centrum or Stadscentrum (city centre) is the central district of Doetinchem, the biggest city in the Gelderse Achterhoek. On the south side of the district is the Oude IJssel river, which can be crossed via three bridges; the Europabrug, the Oude IJsselbrug and the Saap Roelofsbrug. The city centre consists of what was the historical city of Doetinchem until 1945, when it was bombed by the British Royal Air Force, who may have mistaken it for the city of Kleve, Germany. During this bombing, large parts of the district went up in dust, including most of the city wall and city gates. Street names in the district and the piece of wall remaining by the riverbank of the Oude IJssel commemorate these.

The district has a variety of shops, catering for the regional market, as well as multiple restaurants, bars, cafés and a hotel. Cultural services can be found in the district as well.
