= Winterswijk–Zevenaar railway =

Railway line in the Netherlands

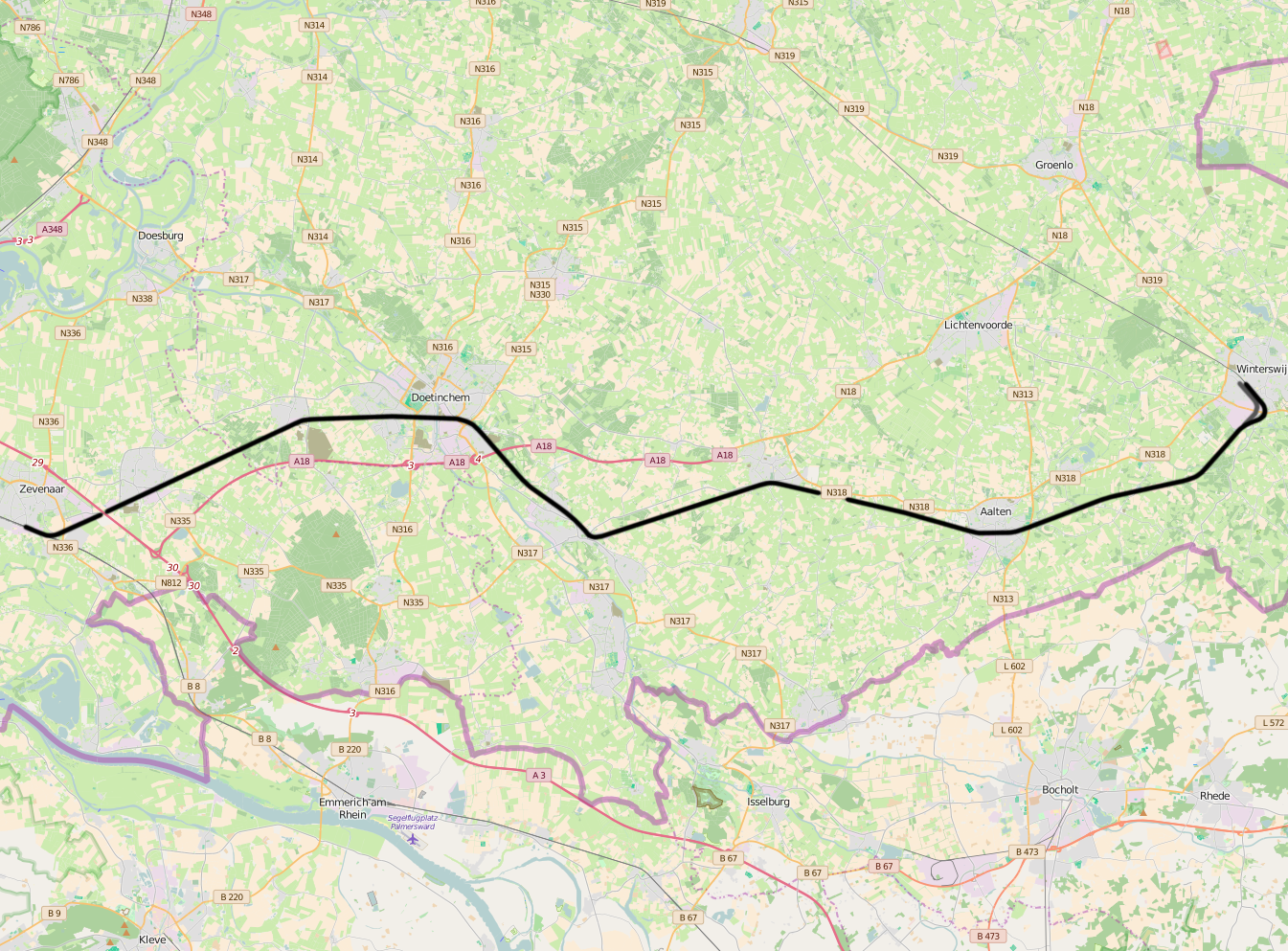

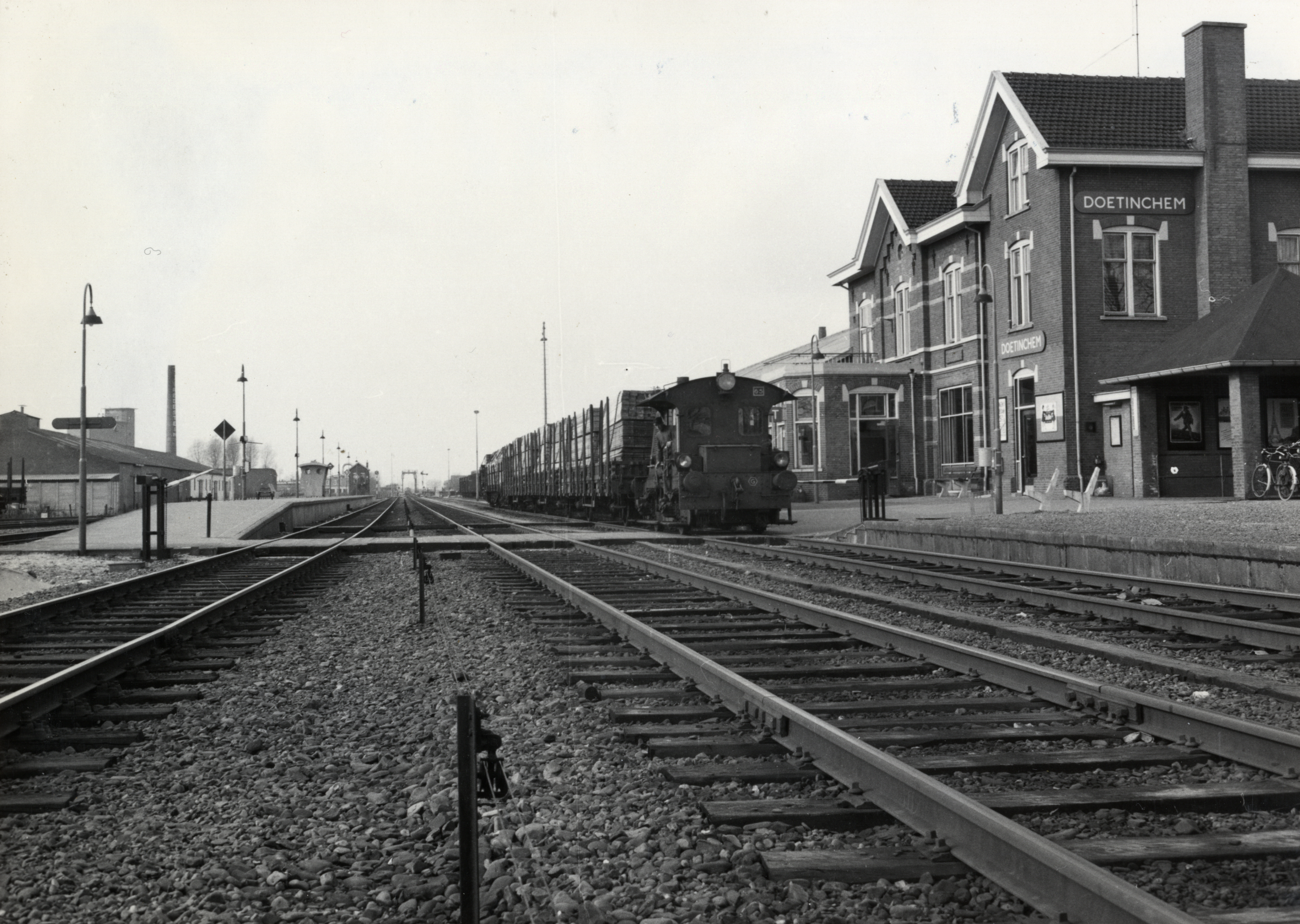
- Doetinchem station in 1966

Overview
- Status: in use
- Locale: Netherlands
- Termini: Winterswijk; Zevenaar

Service
- Type: Heavy rail
- Operator(s): Arriva, Breng

History
- Opened: 1885

Technical
- Line length: 49.6 km (30.8 mi)
- Number of tracks: 2 (Zevenaar - Didam); 1 (Didam - Winterswijk)
- Track gauge: 1,435 mm (4 ft 8 1/2 in) standard gauge
- Electrification: no
- Operating speed: 120 km/h (75 mph), Zevenaar - Didam; 130 km/h (81 mph), Didam - Wehl; 100 km/h (62 mph), Wehl - Winterswijk

The Winterswijk – Zevenaar railway is a 49-kilometre-long (30 mi) Dutch regional railway line, that connects Arnhem and Zevenaar with Doetinchem and Winterswijk.

== Opening ==
The railway opened on 15 July 1885. It was part of a network of local railways in the Twente and Achterhoek regions, built by the Geldersch-Overijsselsche Spoorweg Maatschappij (GOLS). The line between Winterswijk and Zevenaar is the last of these railway lines which are still in regular use.

== Modernisation ==
On 31 August 2015 a 700-metre (2,300 ft) extension of double track around Wehl was put into use to improve reliability on the line.

In the summer of 2019, the track between Zevenaar and Didam became double track. The speed of the line between Zevenaar and Didam increased from 100 km/h (62 mph) to 120 km/h (75 mph). The speed of the line between Didam and Wehl also increased from 100 km/h (62 mph) to 130 km/h (81 mph).

== Usage ==
=== Train services ===
When the line opened there were just a few passenger trains per day between Winterswijk and Zevenaar. More trains operated between Zevenaar and Doetinchem, which continued to Ruurlo. From 1918 the train service was more frequent and most service operated to and from Arnhem. At the end of the 1930s, there was a train service between Arnhem and Winterswijk every two hours. Between Arnhem and Doetinchem there were extra services operated, meaning there was an hourly service. The train from Doetinchem to Arnhem continued to Ede and Amersfoort operating via the Nijkerk–Ede-Wageningen railway. This service ceased at the start of World War II. In 1947 an hourly service was introduced between Arnhem and Winterswijk and a few years later peak hour extra services started between Arnhem and Doetinchem. These extra services quickly expanded to operate the whole day. In the 1970s when the regular timetable was introduced across the Netherlands, the service between Arnhem and Doetinchem became a half-hourly frequency. Half-hourly services later also started on Saturdays and since 1995 on Sundays too.

In 1999, Syntus took over the train services between Doetinchem and Winterswijk, with trains operating half-hourly except on Sunday mornings and early afternoons when an hourly service was offered. Until 2001 passengers to/from Arnhem had to change trains in Doetinchem, but from then on there was a through service available again between Arnhem, Doetinchem and Winterswijk. From 2001 to 2003, Syntus operated extra peak hour trains between Arnhem and Zevenaar and from 2003 these were extended to Doetinchem.

In 2012 the train services were taken over by Arriva and Breng. On Monday to Friday they operate a quarter-hourly service between Arnhem and Doetinchem. Arriva operate the services between Arnhem and Winterswijk. Breng operate the services between Arnhem and Doetinchem, which only operate Monday to Friday.

=== Train types ===
Steam trains operated for a long time between Arnhem and Winterswijk. The train service from Amersfoort to Doetinchem introduced in 1937 was operated by diesel multiple units. During and after World War II only steam trains operated on the line. In the early 1950s new DE 3 units were introduced. By 1955 all services on the line were operated by Plan X trains. From 1963 some of the train services were operated by Plan U and DE 5 diesel multiple units. Locomotives with coaching stock took over the peak hour trains between Arnhem and Winterswijk from 1972 and remained in service until the summer of 1987. In the summer of 1983 and winter of 1984/85 these train services were operated by three Plan X units coupled together. From 1987 Plan U operated all services on the line.

From the summer of 1996 new DM'90 diesel multiple units were tested in service between Arnhem and Doetinchem and later in the year also to Winterswijk. Once Syntus took over services on the line from 1999 most trains were operated by LINT trains as well as DM'90 units. Since 9 December 2012, when Arriva and Breng took over the services Stadler GTW diesel multiple units have been operated on the line.
