= Breng =

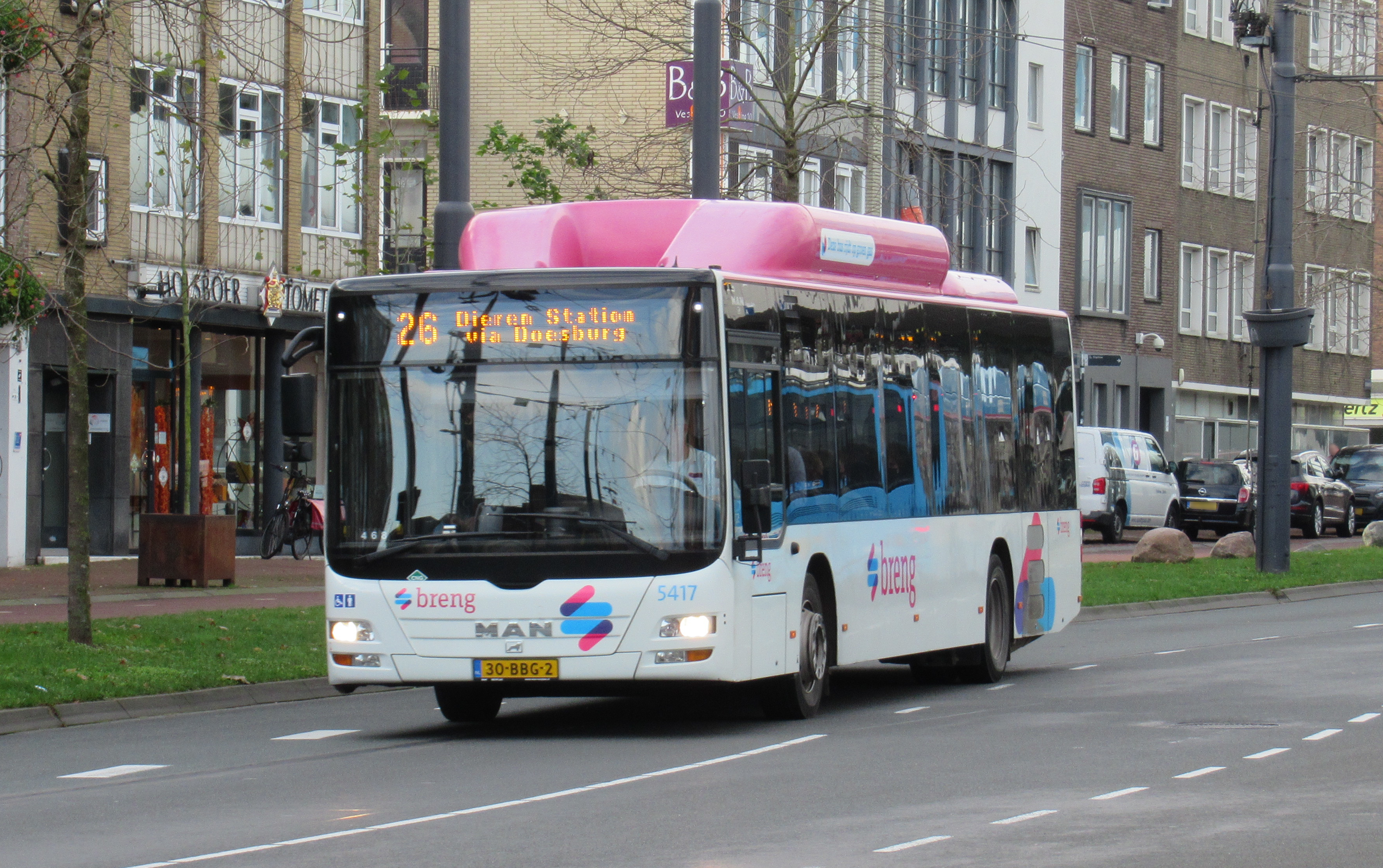
Hermes Breng MAN Lion's City CNG 5417 at Arnhem Central Station.

Breng was the name of a public transportation concept in the Stadsregio Arnhem–Nijmegen in the Netherlands.

Novio (a branch of Connexxion) was the operator from 13 December 2009, for a period of 3 years. On 9 December 2012 Hermes, another branch of Connexxion, became the operator in the region and continues to operate as Breng. Hermes operated under the Breng name until late June 2026. Since then, the brand name has disappeared and has been replaced by RRReis

== See also ==
- Rail transport in the Netherlands
