= Winterswijk railway station =

Railway station in the Netherlands

Winterswijk
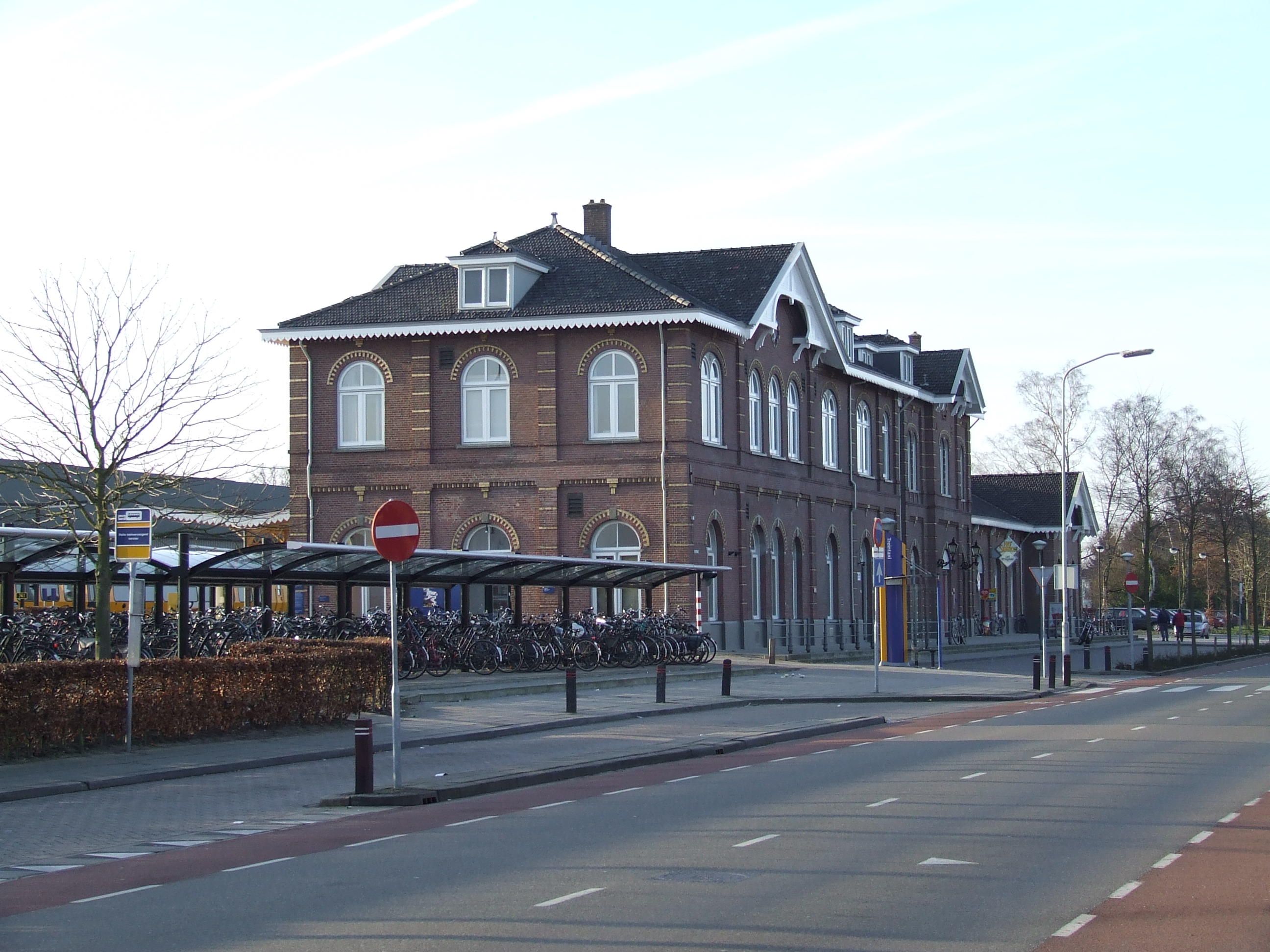

General information
- Location: Netherlands
- Coordinates: 51°58′03″N 6°42′56″E
- Lines: Zutphen–Winterswijk railway Winterswijk–Zevenaar railway

History
- Opened: 1878

Services
Preceding station	Arriva Netherlands	Following station
Winterswijk West towards Zutphen	Stoptrein 30800	Terminus
Aalten towards Arnhem Centraal	Stoptrein 30900	Terminus
Location
- Location within Netherlands

Winterswijk is a railway station in Winterswijk, Netherlands. The station opened on 24 June 1878 and is located on the Zutphen–Winterswijk railway and the Winterswijk–Zevenaar railway. The train services are operated by Arriva.

The station used to be an important point where freight trains would go into Germany. There used to be lines going in 5 directions: Arnhem, Zutphen, Bocholt (Germany), Borken (Germany) and Neede. Today there are 3 buses to Germany, otherwise passengers have to travel to Arnhem, Hengelo or Enschede.

== Train services ==
Route	Service type	Operator	Notes
Zutphen - Winterswijk	Local ("Sprinter")	Arriva	2x per hour (only 1x per hour after 20:00, on Saturday mornings and Sundays)
Arnhem - Doetinchem - Winterswijk	Local ("Sprinter")	Arriva	2x per hour (only 1x per hour after 20:00, on Saturday mornings and Sundays)

=== Bus services ===
Line	Route	Operator	Notes
73	Winterswijk - Meddo - Groenlo - Eibergen - Haaksbergen - Enschede	Arriva	Only runs part of the evening and not on Sundays. On evenings and Saturdays, it only operates between Winterswijk and Groenlo.
B7	(Winterswijk -) Oeding - Südlohn - Stadtlohn (Germany)	RVM	Runs approx. every two hours, but only 6 (3 per direction) buses run through to Winterswijk. Not on evenings and weekends.
R71	Winterswijk - Gaxel - Vreden (Germany)	RVM	Not on evenings and Sundays.
T10	Winterswijk - Barlo (Germany)	RVM	This bus only operates if called one hour before its supposed departure ("belbus"). Doesn't run in the AM rush hours and only 3x a day on Saturdays. Not on Sundays.
T55	Winterswijk - Oeding (Germany)	RVM	This bus only operates if called one hour before its supposed departure ("belbus"). Only runs on Saturdays.

== Gallery ==
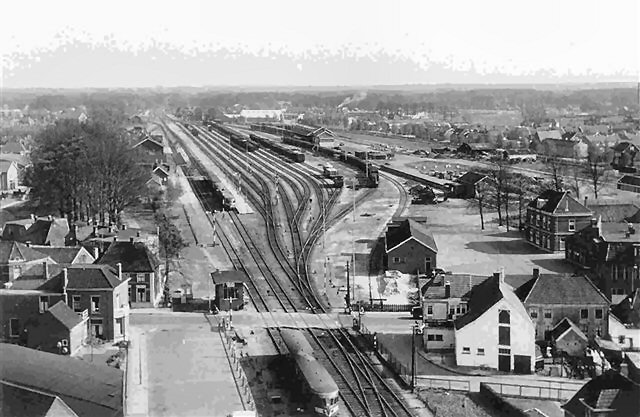
Winterswijk station in 1950
