= Nijmegen Dukenburg railway station =

Railway station in the Netherlands

Nijmegen Dukenburg
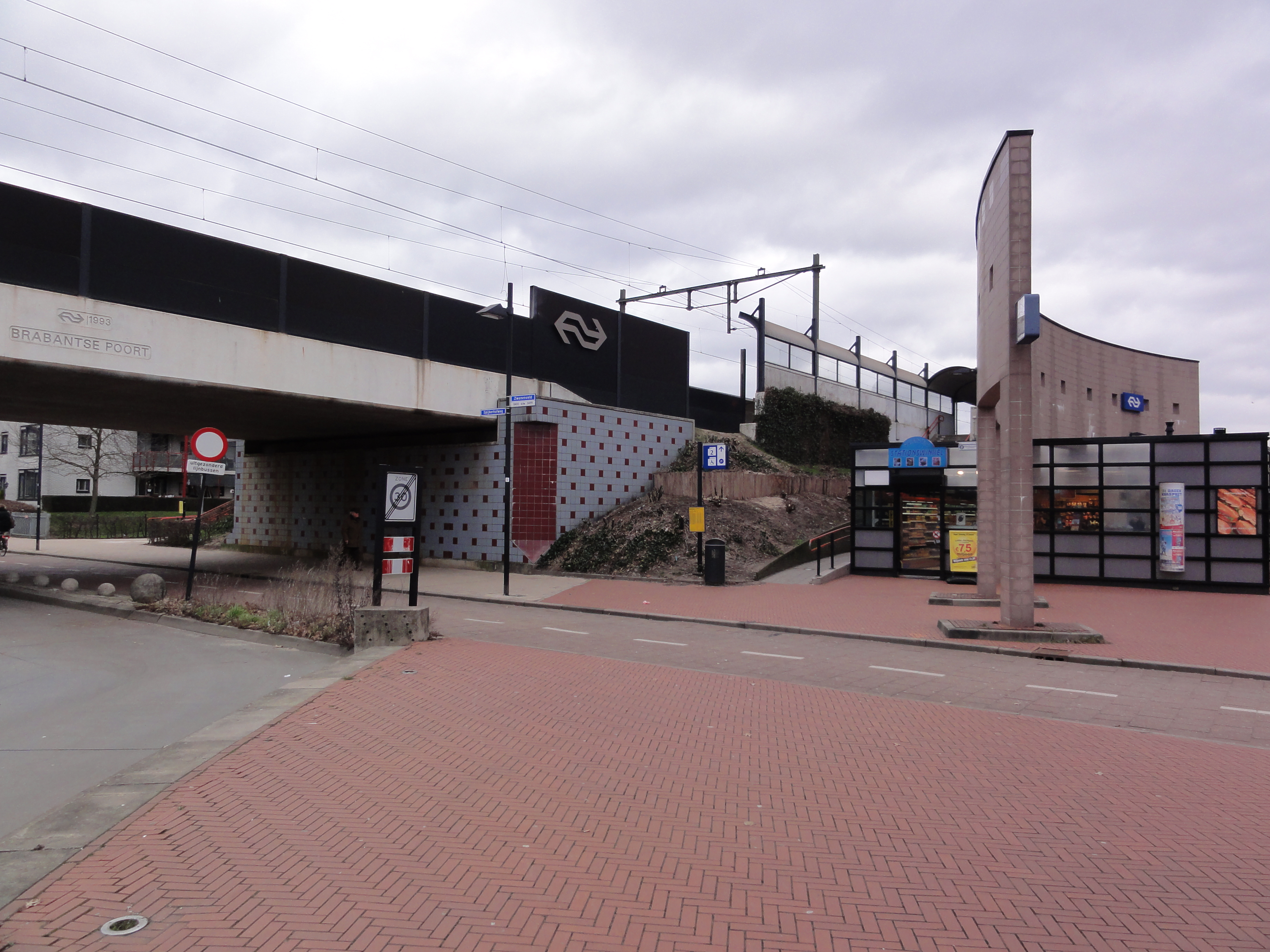

General information
- Location: Netherlands
- Coordinates: 51°49′26″N 5°47′41″E
- Line: Tilburg–Nijmegen railway

History
- Opened: 1973

Services
Preceding station	Nederlandse Spoorwegen	Following station
Wijchen towards Dordrecht	NS Sprinter 6600 Mon-Sat until 19:00	Nijmegen Goffert towards Arnhem Centraal
Wijchen towards Dordrecht	NS Sprinter 6600 After 19:00 and Sun	Nijmegen Goffert towards Nijmegen
Wijchen Terminus	NS Sprinter 7600 Not on evenings and Sundays	Nijmegen Goffert towards Zutphen
Location
- Location within Netherlands

Nijmegen Dukenburg is a railway station located in the south west of Nijmegen, Netherlands. The station was opened on 2 June 1973 and is located on the Tilburg–Nijmegen railway. The train services are operated by Nederlandse Spoorwegen. The main station of Nijmegen is Nijmegen railway station.

== Train services ==
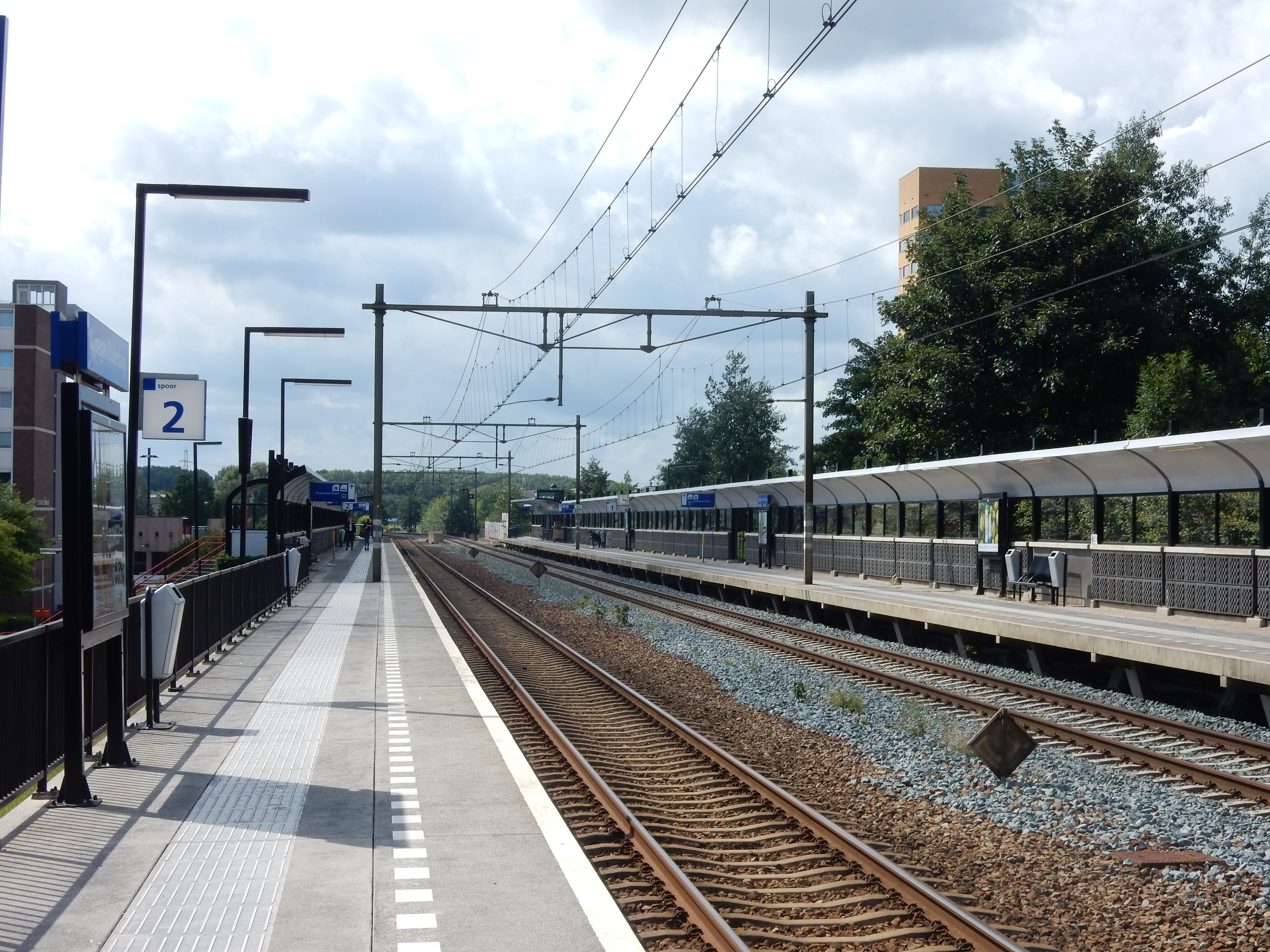
View over the platforms

The following services currently call at Nijmegen Dukenburg:

- 2x per hour local services (Sprinter) Nijmegen - Oss - 's-Hertogenbosch
- 2x per hour local services (Sprinter) Wijchen - Nijmegen - Zutphen

== Bus services ==
There is a bus station near the station, also called Nijmegen Dukenburg. The name of this station used to be Brabantse Poort but was changed at the end of 2013 after an online poll.

- 2 - Weezenhof - Nijmegen Dukenburg - Nijmegen (Centraal Station) - Plein 1944 - Novio
- 3 - St. Maartens Clinic - Plein 1944 - Nijmegen (Centraal Station) - Station Heyendaal - University - CWZ Hospital - Nijmegen Dukenburg - Wijchen North - Wijchen - Novio
- 4 - St. Maartens Clinic - Plein 1944 - Nijmegen (Centraal Station) - Station Heyendaal - University - CWZ Hospital - Nijmegen Dukenburg - Wijchen South - Wijchen - Novio
- 6 - Nijmegen Dukenburg - Hatert - University Hospital - Nijmegen (Centraal Station) - Plein 1944 - Neerbosch-Oost - Novio
- 7 - Nijmegen Dukenburg - Lindenholt West - Plein 1944 - Nijmegen (Centraal Station) - Brakkenstein - Novio
- 11 - Beuningen - Lindenholt Oost - Nijmegen Dukenburg - CWZ Hospital - University - Station Heyendaal - Nijmegen (Centraal Station) (Does not operate between Nijmegen Dukenburg and Centraal Station on Saturdays, Service does not operate Evenings and Sundays) - Hermes
- 87 - Nijmegen (Centraal Station) - Nijmegen Dukenburg - Druten - Hermes
- 99 - Nijmegen (Centraal Station) - Nijmegen Dukenburg - Alverna - Nederasselt - Grave - Velp - Reek - Zeeland - Uden - Hermes

These services are both town and regional services. More regional services operate from the Centraal Station.
