= Arnhem Zuid railway station =

Railway station in the Netherlands

Arnhem Zuid
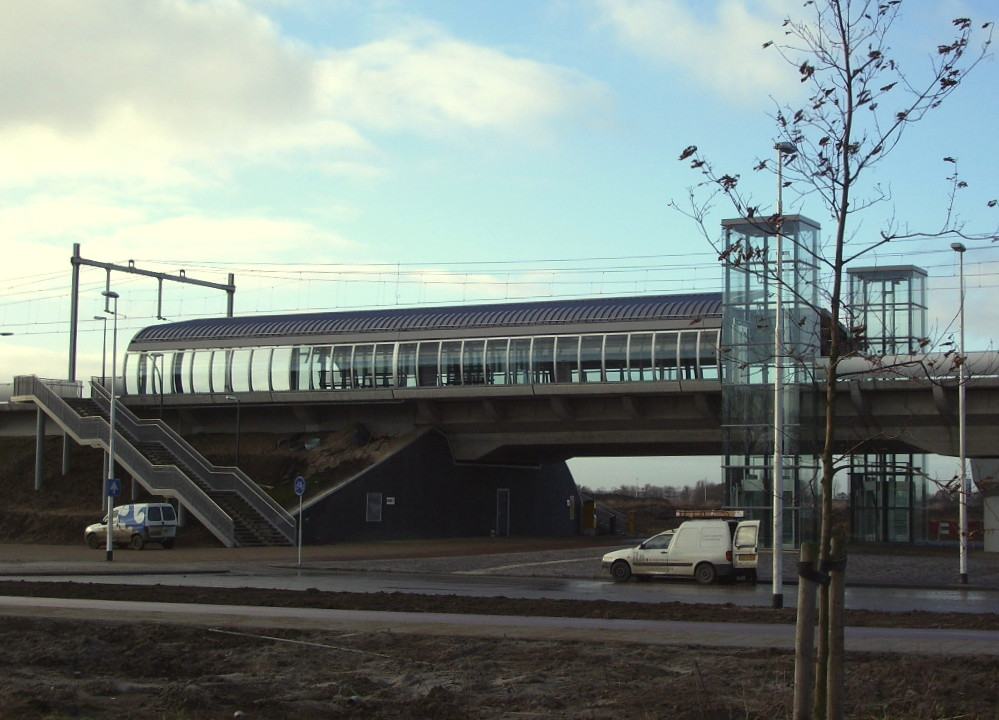

General information
- Location: Netherlands
- Coordinates: 51°57′15″N 5°51′06″E
- Line: Arnhem–Nijmegen railway
- Platforms: 2

Other information
- Station code: Ahz

History
- Opened: 2005

Services
Preceding station	Nederlandse Spoorwegen	Following station
Elst towards Dordrecht	NS Sprinter 6600 Mon-Sat until 19:00	Arnhem Centraal Terminus
Elst towards Wijchen	NS Sprinter 7600	Arnhem Centraal towards Zutphen
Location
- Location within Netherlands

Arnhem Zuid is a railway station located in southern Arnhem, Netherlands. The station was opened on 11 December 2005 and is located on the Arnhem - Nijmegen railway line. The station is operated by Nederlandse Spoorwegen.

== Train services ==
The following services stop at Arnhem Zuid:

Route	Service type	Operator	Notes
Zutphen - Arnhem - Nijmegen - Wijchen	Local ("Sprinter")	NS	2x per hour. After 20:00 and on Sundays, this train does not run between Nijmegen and Wijchen.
Arnhem - Nijmegen - 's-Hertogenbosch - Tilburg - Breda - Dordrecht	Local ("Sprinter")	NS	2x per hour. After 20:00, this train does not run between Arnhem and Nijmegen. On Sundays, this train only runs 1x per hour until 16:30 and only between 's-Hertogenbosch and Arnhem Centraal.

== Bus services ==
Line	Route	Operator	Notes
4	Arnhem Schuytgraaf - Arnhem Zuid Station - Elden - Kronenburg - Malburgen Oost - Het Duifje	Transdev	No service during evenings and on Sundays. Drives around Schuytgraaf clockwise
5	Arnhem Schuytgraaf - Arnhem Zuid Station - Arnhem Elderveld - Arnhem CS - Arnhem Presikhaaf	Transdev	Drives around Schuytgraaf counterclockwise
36	Arnhem CS - Arnhem Zuid Station - Driel - Heteren	Transdev	
43	Arnhem Zuid Station - Arnhem Kronenburg - Arnhem Malburgen - Arnhem Het Broek - Arnhem Presikhaaf - Velp - Rheden - De Steeg - Ellecom - Dieren - Laag-Soeren - Eerbeek - Loenen - Beekbergen - Apeldoorn	Transdev	
805	Arnhem Centrum → Arnhem Elderveld → Arnhem Zuid → Arnhem Schuytgraaf → Driel → Heteren → Indoornik → Zetten	Transdev	This bus only operates on Saturday late nights (between midnight and 5:00). Boarding is only possible from Arnhem Willemsplein.

== Gallery ==
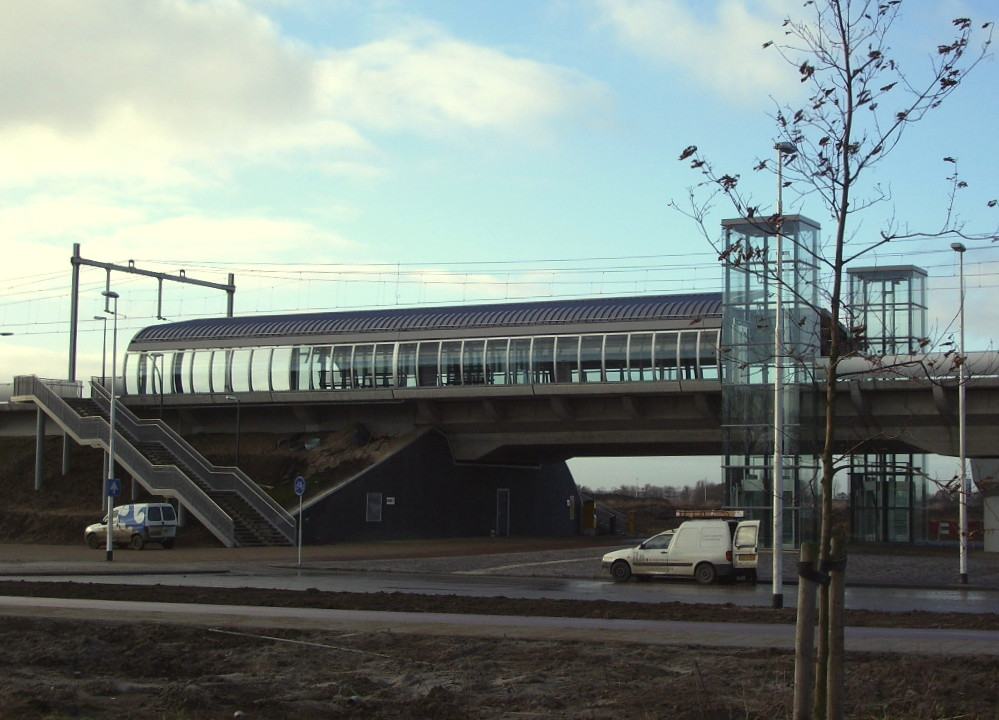
Arnhem Zuid Station

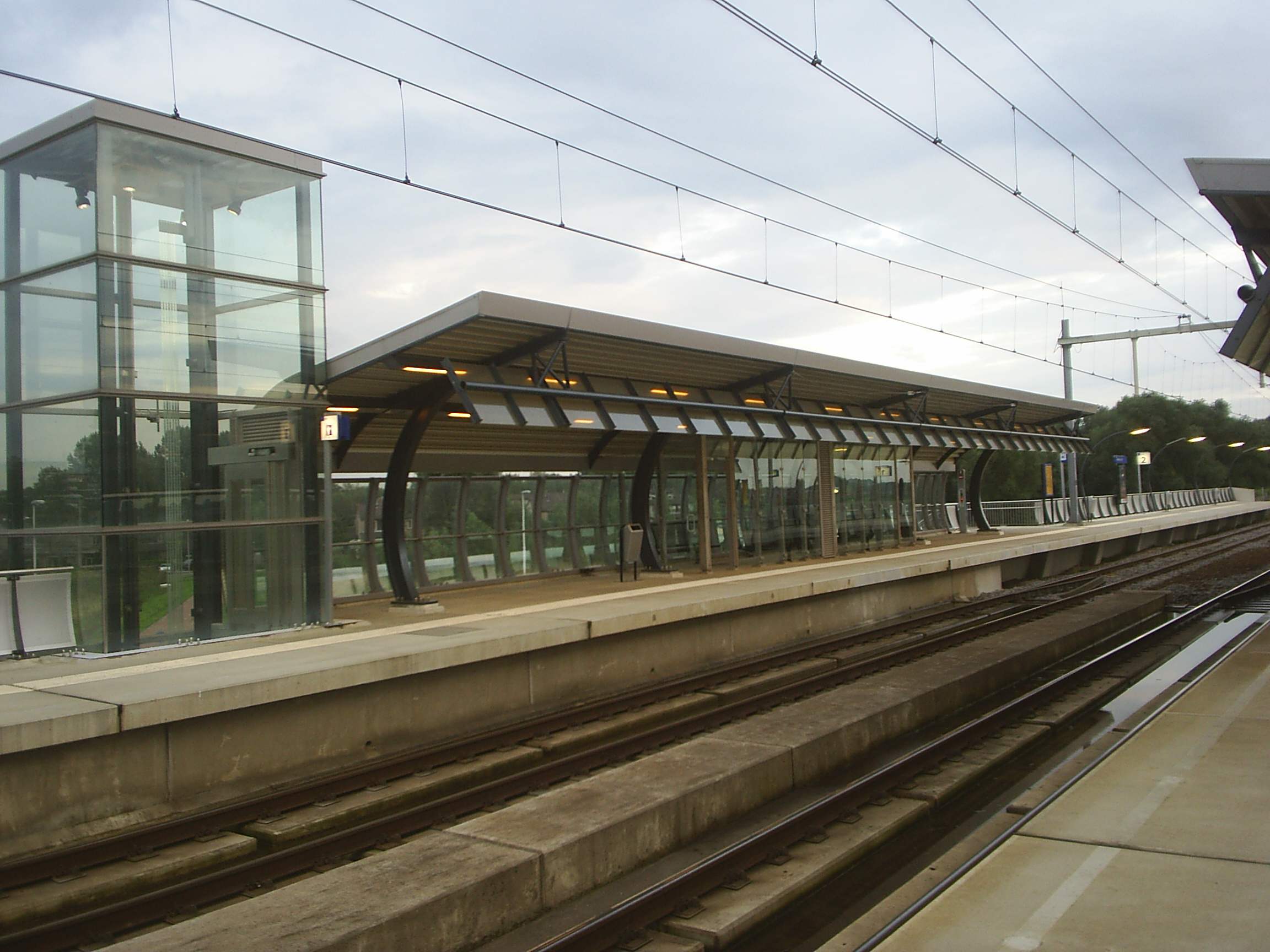
The Waiting Area

== Other Stations in Arnhem ==
- Arnhem
- Arnhem Presikhaaf railway station
- Arnhem Velperpoort
