= Nijmegen Goffert railway station =

Railway station in Gelderland, Netherlands

Nijmegen Goffert
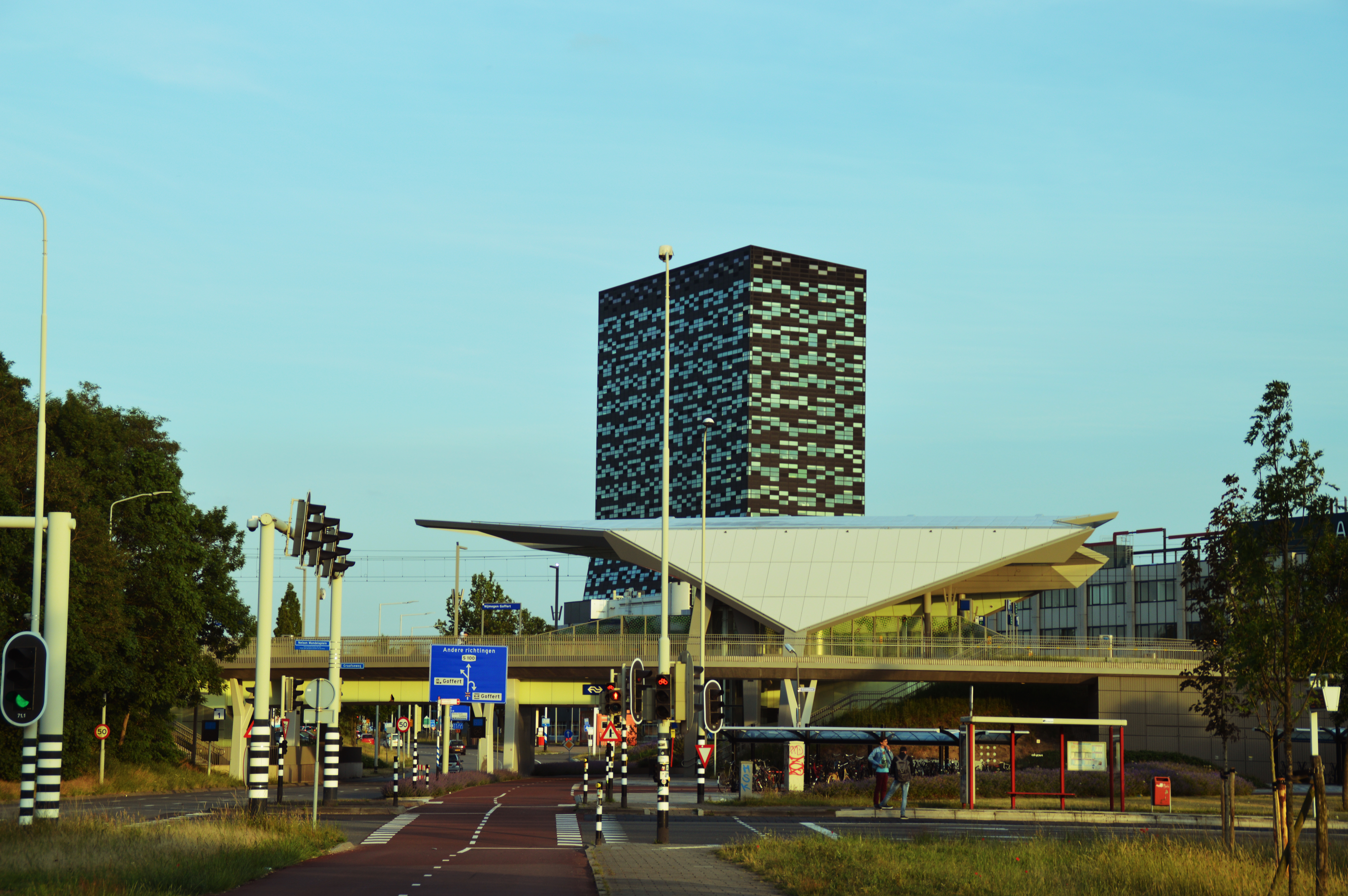

General information
- Location: Netherlands
- Coordinates: 51°49′38″N 5°49′27″E
- Line: Tilburg–Nijmegen railway

History
- Opened: 14 December 2014

Services
Preceding station	Nederlandse Spoorwegen	Following station
Nijmegen Dukenburg towards Dordrecht	NS Sprinter 6600 Mon-Sat until 19:00	Nijmegen towards Arnhem Centraal
Nijmegen Dukenburg towards Dordrecht	NS Sprinter 6600 After 19:00 and Sun	Nijmegen Terminus
Nijmegen Dukenburg towards Wijchen	NS Sprinter 7600 Not on evenings and Sundays	Nijmegen towards Zutphen
Location
- Location within Netherlands

Nijmegen Goffert is a railway station located in the south west of Nijmegen, Netherlands. The station opened on 14 December 2014 and is located on the Tilburg–Nijmegen railway. The train services are operated by Nederlandse Spoorwegen.

== Train services ==
The station is served by the following service(s):

- 2x per hour local services (stoptrein) Arnhem - Nijmegen - Oss - 's-Hertogenbosch - Dordrecht
- 2x per hour, rush hours only, additional local services (stoptrein) Zutphen - Nijmegen - Wijchen
