= Nijmegen Lent railway station =

Railway station in Nijmegen, the Netherlands

Nijmegen Lent
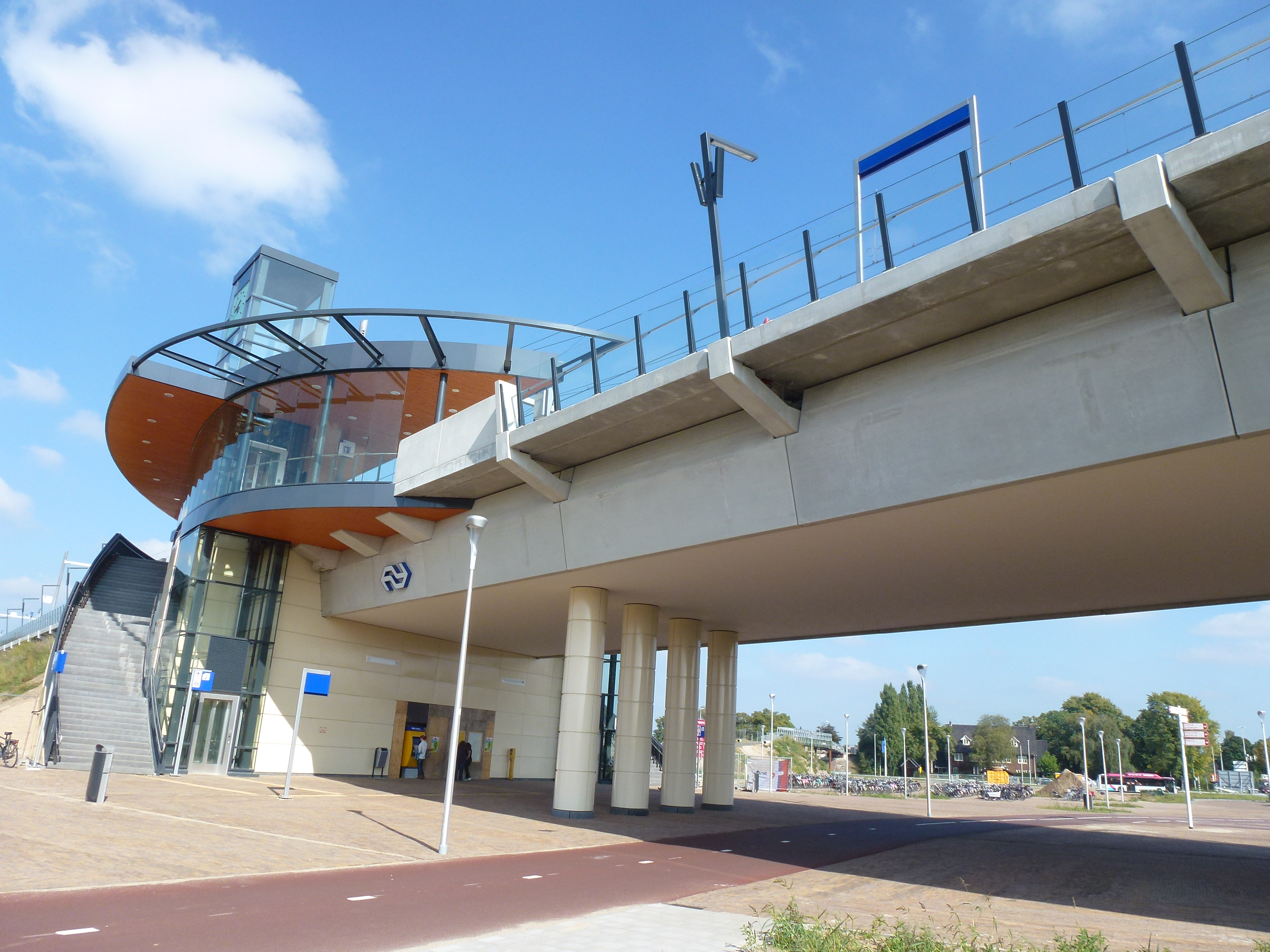

General information
- Location: Netherlands
- Coordinates: 51°51′52″N 5°51′34″E
- Line: Arnhem–Nijmegen railway

History
- Opened: 1882, reopened 2002
- Closed: 1934

Services
Preceding station	Nederlandse Spoorwegen	Following station
Nijmegen towards Dordrecht	NS Sprinter 6600 Mon-Sat until 19:00	Elst towards Arnhem Centraal
Nijmegen towards Wijchen	NS Sprinter 7600	Elst towards Zutphen
Location
- Location within Netherlands

Nijmegen Lent is a railway station located in Lent, just north of Nijmegen, Netherlands. The station was opened on 1 June 2002 and is located on the Arnhem–Nijmegen railway. The train services are operated by Nederlandse Spoorwegen.

The station opened in 2002 was actually a temporary station for 11 years. On 25 July 2013 the new, permanent, station was opened which features lifts. This station is located 250m further south than the temporary station.

== History ==
The first station of Lent opened in 1882 and was closed in 1934 because there were too few passengers. During World War II, the station was opened again twice, in 1940 and 1941 and when the bridge into Nijmegen was blown up, this was the terminating station for trains from Arnhem temporarily.

The station was reopened on 1 June 2002 as part of the Waalsprong development of Nijmegen.

== Train services ==
As of 11 December 2016, the following train services call at this station:

- Local services:
  - Sprinter: 's-Hertogenbosch - Nijmegen - Arnhem
  - Sprinter: (Wijchen -) Nijmegen - Arnhem - Zutphen

== Bus services ==
- 13: Lent - Nijmegen station - Heyendaal - University - Wilhelmina Hospital - Dukenburg - Bijsterhuizen - Wijchen
- 14: Arnhem - Elden - Elst - Lent - Nijmegen
- 15: Lent - Nijmegen station - Heyendaal - University - Wilhelmina Hospital - Dukenburg - Wijchen
- 33: Arnhem - Huissen - Angeren - Doornenburg - Gendt - Haalderen - Bemmel - Lent - Nijmegen
- 300: Arnhem - Huissen - Bemmel - Lent - Nijmegen
- 331: Arnhem - Elst - Lent - Nijmegen
- N30: Arnhem - Huissen - Bemmel - Nijmegen (Night bus)
- N31: Arnhem - Elst - Nijmegen (Night bus)
