= Delden railway station =

Railway station in the Netherlands

Delden
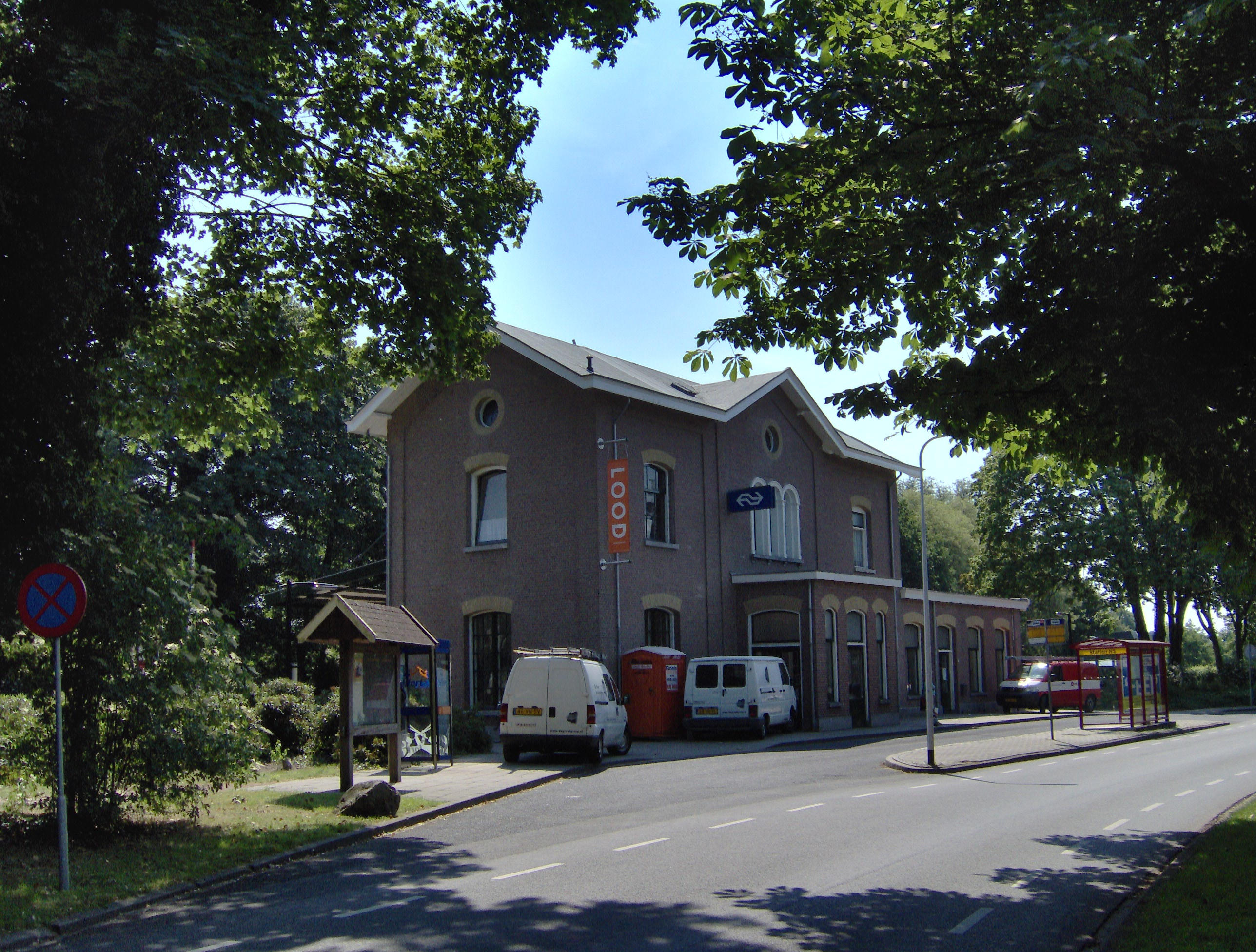

General information
- Location: Netherlands
- Coordinates: 52°15′36″N 6°42′52″E
- Line: Zutphen–Glanerbeek railway

History
- Opened: 1 November 1865

Services
Preceding station	Syntus	Following station
Goor towards Zutphen	Stoptrein 31200	Hengelo towards Oldenzaal
Location
- Location within Netherlands

Delden is a railway station located in Delden, Netherlands. The station was opened on 1 November 1865 and is located on the Zutphen–Glanerbeek railway between Zutphen and Hengelo. Train services are operated by Syntus.

== Train services ==
Route	Service type	Operator	Notes
Oldenzaal - Hengelo (- Zutphen)	Local ("Stoptrein")	Syntus	2x per hour - Late nights and Sundays before 14:00 1x per hour

== Bus services ==
Line	Route	Operator	Notes
66	(Neede - Markvelde - Hengevelde - Bentelo -) Delden - Bornerbroek - Almelo - Albergen - Fleringen - Weerselo - Lemselo - Oldenzaal	Twents	Outside of rush hours, this bus only operates between Delden and Oldenzaal. No service on Sundays.
