= Ravenstein railway station =

Railway station in the Netherlands

Ravenstein
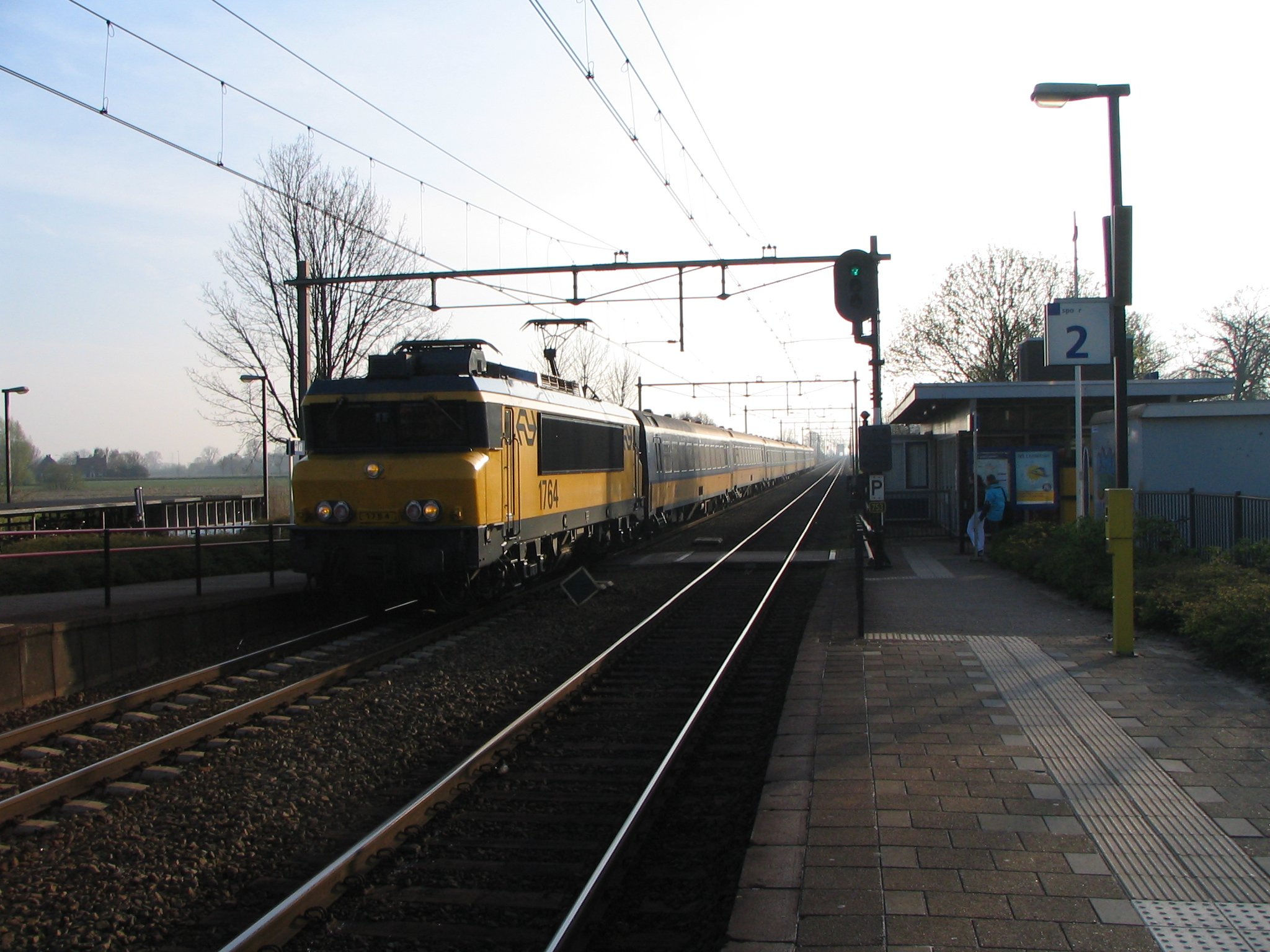

General information
- Location: Netherlands
- Coordinates: 51°47′41″N 5°38′14″E
- Line: Tilburg–Nijmegen railway

History
- Opened: 4 June 1881

Services
Preceding station	Nederlandse Spoorwegen	Following station
Oss towards Dordrecht	NS Sprinter 6600 Mon-Sat until 19:00	Wijchen towards Arnhem Centraal
Oss towards Dordrecht	NS Sprinter 6600 After 19:00 and Sun	Wijchen towards Nijmegen
Location
- Location within Netherlands

Ravenstein is a railway station located in Ravenstein, Netherlands. The station originally opened on 4 June 1881 and is located on the Tilburg–Nijmegen railway. The services are currently operated by Nederlandse Spoorwegen.

== Train services ==
The following services currently call at Ravenstein:

- 2x per hour local services (stoptrein) Nijmegen - Oss - 's-Hertogenbosch

== Bus service ==
- 252
