= Goor railway station =

Railway station in the Netherlands

Goor
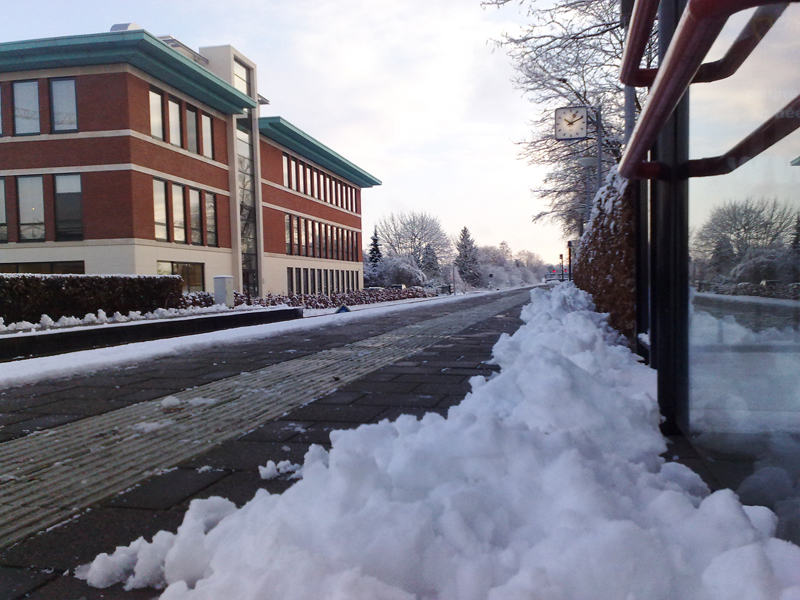

General information
- Location: Netherlands
- Coordinates: 52°13′49″N 6°35′04″E
- Line: Zutphen–Glanerbeek railway

Services
Preceding station	Syntus	Following station
Lochem towards Zutphen	Stoptrein 31200	Delden towards Oldenzaal
Location
- Location within Netherlands

Goor is a railway station located in Goor, Netherlands. The station was opened on 1 November 1865 and is located on the Zutphen–Glanerbeek railway between Zutphen and Hengelo. The train service is operated by Syntus. The trains of the service pass each other at this station.

== Train services ==
Route	Service type	Operator	Notes
Oldenzaal - Hengelo (- Zutphen)	Local ("Stoptrein")	Syntus	2x per hour - Late nights and Sundays before 14:00 1x per hour

== Bus services ==
Line	Route	Operator	Notes
95	Almelo - Wierden - Notter - Rijssen - Enter - Goor - Diepenheim - Geesteren - Borculo	Twents	No service after 22:00 (Mon-Fri), 20:00 (Sat) and on Sundays.
97	Holten - Markelo - Herikerberg - Goor - Hengevelde - Sint Isidorushoeve - Haaksbergen	Twents	No service after 22:00 (Mon-Fri), 20:30 (Sat) and on Sundays. On Saturday evenings, this bus only operates between Holten and Goor.
