= Arnhem Presikhaaf railway station =

Railway station in the Netherlands

Arnhem Presikhaaf
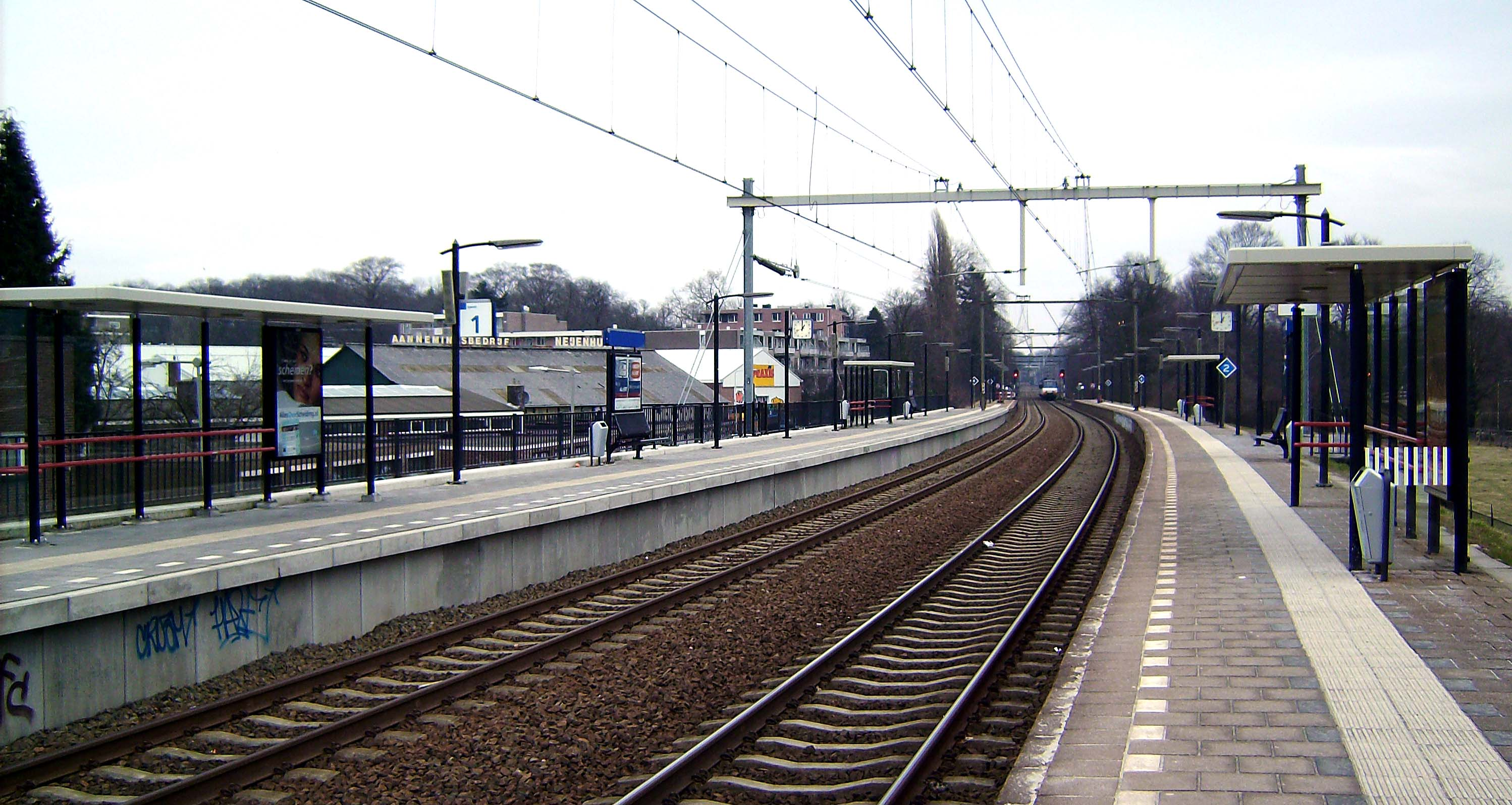

General information
- Location: Netherlands
- Coordinates: 51°59′15″N 5°56′35″E
- Line: Arnhem–Leeuwarden railway
- Platforms: 2

Other information
- Station code: Ahpr

History
- Opened: 28 September 1969

Services
| Preceding station | Nederlandse Spoorwegen | Following station |
|---|---|---|
| Arnhem Velperpoort towards Wijchen | NS Sprinter 7600 | Velp towards Zutphen |
Location
- Location within Netherlands

Arnhem Presikhaaf is a railway station located in the neighborhood Presikhaaf of Arnhem, Netherlands. The station was opened on 28 September 1969 and is located on the Arnhem–Leeuwarden railway. The train services at this station are operated by Nederlandse Spoorwegen. The station is the easternmost station in Arnhem. A previous station called Plattenburg was very closely located to the location of the current station (from 1882 to 1905).

== Train services ==
| Route | Service type | Operator | Notes |
|---|---|---|---|
| (Wijchen -) Nijmegen - Arnhem - Zutphen | Local ("Sprinter") | NS | 2x per hour - 1x per hour after 22:00 and on Sundays. |

== Bus services ==
| Line | Route | Operator | Notes |
|---|---|---|---|
| 26 | Arnhem CS - Arnhem Velperpoort - Arnhem Presikhaaf - Velp Zuid - Lathum - Giesbeek - Angerlo - Doesburg - Dieren | Transdev | Mon-Fri: 2x per hour between Doesburg, Kraakselaan and Dieren, but only 1x per hour between Arnhem and Doesburg, Kraakselaan. On evenings and weekends, this bus only operates between Doesburg, Kraakselaan and Dieren. |
| 27 | Arnhem Centraal - Arnhem Velperpoort - Arnhem Presikhaaf - Velp Zuid - Lathum - Giesbeek - Angerlo - Doesburg - Drempt - Hoog-Keppel - Laag-Keppel - Doetinchem | Arriva, Transdev | |
| 127 | Arnhem Centraal - Velperpoort - Presikhaaf West | Transdev | |
| 302 | Velp Zuid - Arnhem Presikhaaf - Arnhem Velperpoort - Arnhem CS - Beekbergen - Apeldoorn | Transdev | This bus is a ComfortRRReis service, which means it's an express bus. |
| 801 | Arnhem Centrum → Arnhem Presikhaaf → Velp → Rheden → De Steeg → Ellecom → Dieren → Doesburg | Transdev | Only two runs during Saturday late nights. A special tariff applies. |

== Other stations in Arnhem ==
- Arnhem Centraal
- Arnhem Velperpoort
- Arnhem Zuid
