= Elst railway station =

Railway station in the Netherlands

Elst
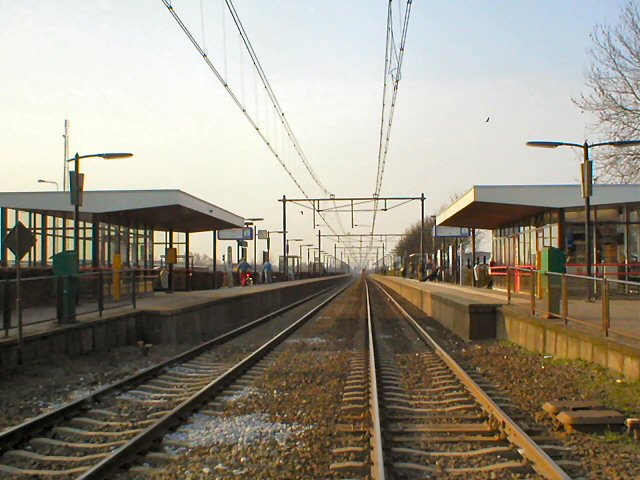

General information
- Location: Netherlands
- Coordinates: 51°55′00″N 5°51′18″E
- Lines: Arnhem–Nijmegen railway Elst–Dordrecht railway

History
- Opened: 1879

Services
| Preceding station | Nederlandse Spoorwegen | Following station |
|---|---|---|
| Nijmegen Lent towards Dordrecht | NS Sprinter 6600 Mon-Sat until 19:00 | Arnhem Zuid towards Arnhem Centraal |
| Nijmegen Lent towards Wijchen | NS Sprinter 7600 | Arnhem Zuid towards Zutphen |
| Nijmegen Terminus | NS Nachtnet 21430 Fri/Sat night only | Arnhem Centraal towards Utrecht Centraal |
| Preceding station | Arriva Netherlands | Following station |
| Zetten-Andelst towards Tiel | Stoptrein 31100 | Arnhem Centraal Terminus |
Location
- Location within Netherlands

Elst is a railway station located in Elst, Netherlands. The station was opened on 15 June 1879 and is located on the Arnhem–Nijmegen railway. The station is operated by Nederlandse Spoorwegen, with the service towards Tiel operated by Arriva. Just south of the station the Elst–Dordrecht railway branches off towards Tiel.

The station has 3 platforms, a waiting area with multiple covered waiting areas. There is a bus stop located at the west side of the station, a parking garage on the east side, and bicycle sheds on both sides

At the time when the Elst–Dordrecht railway had an important significance for freight transport, was there a shunting yard (without a shunting hump) located east of the station. The tracks were broken up in the 1980s, and the location is no longer visible since the car and bicycle tunnels were built. At this moment is an outpatient clinic is being built on the location of the shunting yard.

The trains from the Elst–Dordrecht railway have to cross the track in the direction of Nijmegen before entering Elst. Because the Arnhem–Nijmegen railway is quite busy, it was decided to give the trains from the Elst–Dordrecht railway their own departure track with a platform in Elst. This is a terminal track so that the trains to the Elst–Dordrecht railway no longer depart from Arnhem but from Elst. Construction of the third track started in early 2014. Since the end of 2014, the third track can be used. The end track has been put into use from the 2017 timetable, with Elst being the terminus of the Arnhem Centraal - Tiel train service once an hour during off-peak hours.

== Train services ==
| Route | Service type | Operator | Notes |
|---|---|---|---|
| Zutphen - Arnhem - Nijmegen - Wijchen | Local ("Sprinter") | NS | 2x per hour. After 20:00 and on Sundays, this train does not operate between Nijmegen and Wijchen. |
| Arnhem - Nijmegen - 's-Hertogenbosch - Tilburg - Breda - Dordrecht | Local ("Sprinter") | NS | 2x per hour. After 20:00, this train does not operate between Arnhem and Nijmegen. On Sundays, this train only operates 1x per hour until 16:30 and only between 's-Hertogenbosch and Arnhem Centraal. |
| Elst - Arnhem Centraal | Local ("Stoptrein") | Arriva | 2x per hour: 1x per hour to Elst and 1x per hour to Arnhem - Evenings and weekends 1x per hour to Arnhem. Does not stop at Arnhem Zuid. |
| Utrecht - Ede-Wageningen - Arnhem - Nijmegen | Express ("Intercity") | NS | This train only operates on Friday and Saturday late nights (between midnight and 5:00). 3 runs per night. |

== Bus services ==
| Line | Route | Operator | Notes |
|---|---|---|---|
| 35 | Bemmel - Elst - Valburg - Herveld - Andelst - Zetten | Breng and TCR | Mon-Fri during daytime hours only. |
| 331 | Velp Zuid - Arnhem Presikhaaf - Arnhem Velperpoort - Arnhem CS - Arnhem Kronenburg - Elst - Oosterhout - Lent - Nijmegen CS - Nijmegen Dukenburg - Nijmegen Weezenhof | Breng | During rush hours and on Saturdays, extra buses operate within Nijmegen only. On evenings and weekends, this bus does not operate between Velp Zuid and Arnhem CS. This bus is a Breng Direct service, which means it's an express bus. |
| 831 | Nijmegen CS → Lent → Oosterhout → Elst → Arnhem De Laar West → Arnhem CS | Breng | This bus only operates on Saturday late nights (between midnight and 5:00). Boarding is only possible from within Nijmegen. |
| 831 | Arnhem Willemsplein → Arnhem De Laar West → Elst → Oosterhout → Lent → Nijmegen CS | Breng | This bus only operates on Saturday late nights (between midnight and 5:00). Boarding is only possible from Arnhem Willemsplein. |

== Trivia ==
The singer and composer Pierre Kartner was born in a house near the railway station, where his father worked as a station master.
