= Lochem railway station =

Railway station in the Netherlands

Lochem
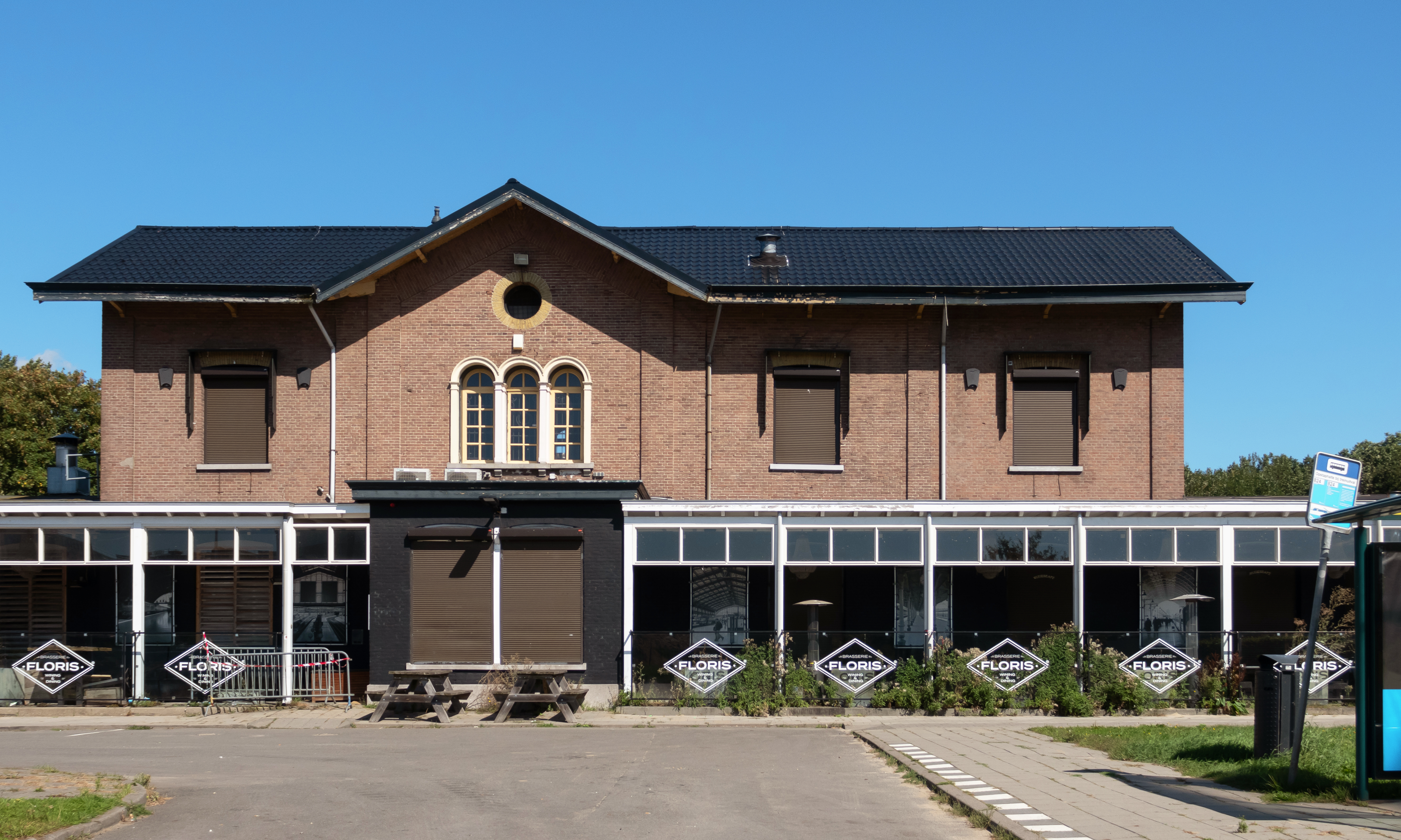

General information
- Location: Netherlands
- Coordinates: 52°10′00″N 6°25′33″E
- Line: Zutphen–Glanerbeek railway

History
- Opened: 1865

Services
Preceding station	Syntus	Following station
Zutphen Terminus	Stoptrein 31200	Goor towards Oldenzaal
Location
- Location within Netherlands

Lochem is a railway station just north of Lochem, Netherlands. The station opened on 1 November 1865 and is located on the Zutphen–Glanerbeek railway (Staatslijn D). The services are operated by Syntus.

The station is located on the opposite side of the Twentekanaal to Lochem, but is a short walk or bus ride.

== Train services ==
Route	Service type	Operator	Notes
Oldenzaal - Hengelo (- Zutphen)	Local ("Stoptrein")	Syntus	2x per hour - Late nights and Sundays before 14:00 1x per hour

== Bus services ==
Line	Route	Operator	Notes
52	Lochem Station - Centrum (town centre) - De Molengronden - Ruighenrode	Arriva	No service after 20:30 and on weekends.
