= Arnhem Velperpoort railway station =

Railway station located in Arnhem, Netherlands

Arnhem Velperpoort
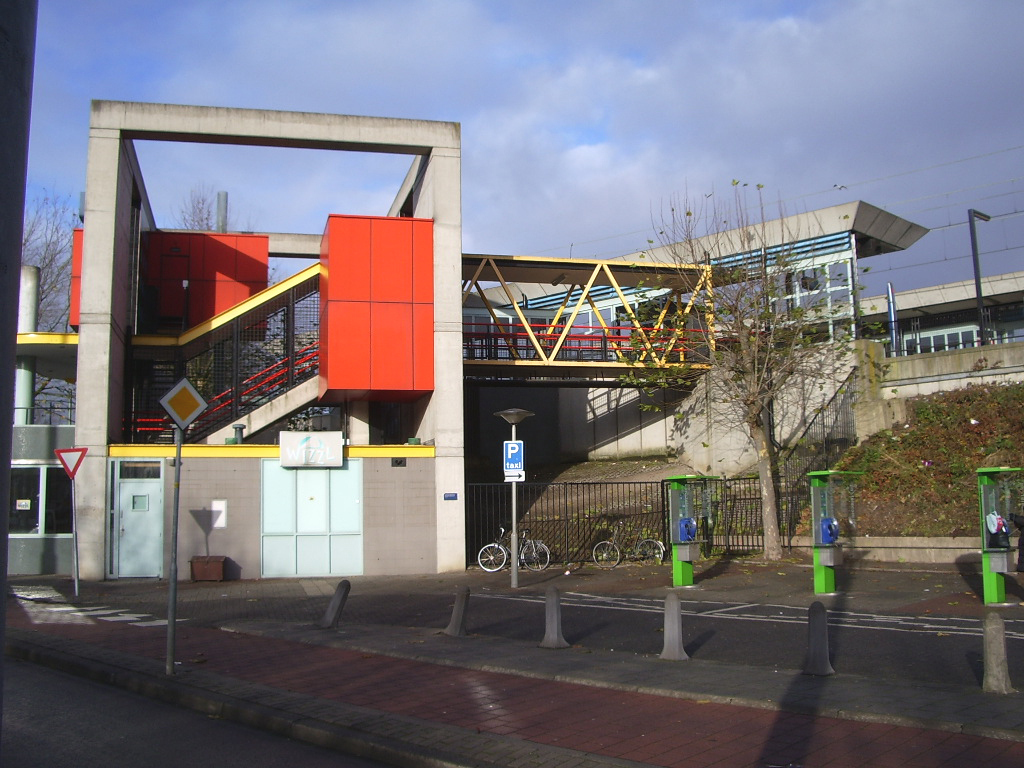

General information
- Location: Netherlands
- Coordinates: 51°59′06″N 5°55′12″E
- Lines: Arnhem–Leeuwarden railway Oberhausen–Arnhem railway
- Platforms: 2

Other information
- Station code: Ahp

History
- Opened: 1893

Services
Preceding station	Nederlandse Spoorwegen	Following station
Arnhem Centraal towards Wijchen	NS Sprinter 7600	Arnhem Presikhaaf towards Zutphen
Preceding station	Breng	Following station
Arnhem Centraal Terminus	Breng Stoptrein 30700	Westervoort towards Doetinchem
Preceding station	Arriva Netherlands	Following station
Arnhem Centraal Terminus	Stoptrein 30900	Westervoort towards Winterswijk
Location
- Location within Netherlands

Arnhem Velperpoort is a railway station located in Arnhem, Netherlands. The station was opened on 1 October 1893, closed on 3 June 1918 and reopened on 5 January 1953. It is located on the Arnhem–Leeuwarden railway and the Oberhausen–Arnhem railway. The train services are operated by Nederlandse Spoorwegen, Arriva and Breng. Previously, the name of the station was just Velperpoort (1893–1918).

== Train services ==
The following services stop at Arnhem Velperpoort:

Route	Service type	Operator	Notes
Arnhem - Doetinchem - Winterswijk	Local ("Sprinter")	Arriva	2x per hour (only 1x per hour after 20:00, on Saturday mornings and Sundays)
Arnhem - Doetinchem	Local ("Sprinter")	Breng	2x per hour - Mon-Fri only. Not on evenings.
(Wijchen -) Nijmegen - Arnhem - Zutphen	Local ("Sprinter")	NS	2x per hour - 1x per hour after 22:00 and on Sundays.

== Bus services ==
Line	Route	Operator	Notes
1	Oosterbeek - Arnhem CS - Arnhem Velperpoort - Velp	Breng	
7	Arnhem Rijkerswoerd - Kronenburg - CS - Velperpoort - Geitenkamp	Breng	
26	(Arnhem CS - Arnhem Velperpoort - Arnhem Presikhaaf - Velp Zuid - Lathum - Giesbeek - Angerlo -) Doesburg - Dieren	Breng	Mon-Fri: 2x per hour between Doesburg, Kraakselaan and Dieren, but only 1x per hour between Arnhem and Doesburg, Kraakselaan. On evenings and weekends, this bus only runs between Doesburg, Kraakselaan and Dieren.
27	Arnhem Centraal - Arnhem Velperpoort - Arnhem Presikhaaf - Velp Zuid - Lathum - Giesbeek - Angerlo - Doesburg - Drempt - Hoog-Keppel - Laag-Keppel - Doetinchem	Arriva, Breng, TCR (only a couple of runs)	
29	Arnhem Centraal - Arnhem Velperpoort - Velp - Rheden - Doesburg - Drempt - Hoog-Keppel - Laag-Keppel - Doetinchem	Arriva, Breng, TCR (only a couple of runs)	Does not run on evenings and weekends.
77	Arnhem CS → Velperpoort → CIOS	Breng	Morning rush hour only.
331	Velp Zuid - Arnhem Presikhaaf - Arnhem Velperpoort - Arnhem CS - Arnhem Kronenburg - Elst - Oosterhout - Lent - Nijmegen CS - Nijmegen Dukenburg - Nijmegen Weezenhof	Breng	During rush hours and on Saturdays, extra buses run within Nijmegen only. On evenings and weekends, this bus does not run between Velp Zuid and Arnhem CS. This bus is a Breng Direct service, which means it's an express bus.
843	Arnhem Willemsplein → Arnhem Velperpoort → Arnhem Presikhaaf → Velp → Rheden → De Steeg → Ellecom → Dieren → Doesburg	Breng	Only two runs during Saturday late nights. A special tariff applies.
