= Westervoort railway station =

Railway station located in Westervoort, Netherlands

Westervoort
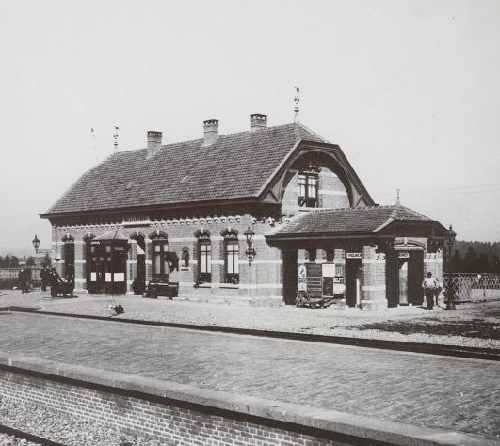
- Westervoort railway station in 1920

General information
- Location: Westervoort, Gelderland, Netherlands
- Coordinates: 51°57′44″N 5°58′13″E
- Line: Oberhausen–Arnhem railway
- Platforms: 2
- Tracks: 2

History
- Opened: 15 February 1856, 11 December 2011
- Closed: 4 October 1936

Services
Preceding station	Breng	Following station
Arnhem Velperpoort towards Arnhem Centraal	Breng Stoptrein 30700	Duiven towards Doetinchem
Preceding station	Arriva Netherlands	Following station
Arnhem Velperpoort towards Arnhem Centraal	Stoptrein 30900	Duiven towards Winterswijk
Location

Westervoort is a railway station in the eastern Netherlands, in the town of Westervoort. The station is situated on the Oberhausen–Arnhem railway. Train services are operated by Arriva and Breng. The original station was opened in 1856 and closed in 1936. The new station opened on 11 December 2011. There used to be another station in Westervoort called Fort Westervoort (from 1890 to 1918). The station ran directly through the middle area of the fort ("castle"). Not much of the castle remains. There was also a station on the other side of the bridge called Oostzijde Brug.

== Train services ==
Route	Service type	Operator	Notes
Arnhem - Doetinchem - Winterswijk	Local ("Sprinter")	Arriva	2x per hour (only 1x per hour after 20:00, on Saturday mornings and Sundays)
Arnhem - Doetinchem	Local ("Sprinter")	Breng	2x per hour - Mon-Fri only. Not on evenings.
Arnhem - Emmerich - Wesel - Oberhausen - Duisburg - Düsseldorf (Germany)	Regional Express (RE 19)	Abellio Deutschland	1x per hour - one morning train and one evening train don't halt at Friedrichsfeld and Oberhausen-Holten

== Bus services ==
Line	Route	Operator	Notes
60	Arnhem CS - Westervoort - Duiven - Zevenaar - Babberich - Herwen - Lobith - Tolkamer	Breng, TCR (only a couple of runs)	On evenings, this bus does not operate between Zevenaar and Tolkamer. On Sundays, this bus only operates between Arnhem and Duiven.
61	Westervoort - Duiven Nieuwgraaf - Duiven Centerpoort Noord	Breng, TCR (only a couple of runs)	Mon-Fri during daytime hours only. During the morning (until 9:30), this bus skips most stops between Duiven and Westervoort (but does serve them in the other direction). During the afternoon rush hour, the same applies, but vice versa.
62	Arnhem CS - Westervoort - Duiven Station - Duiven Centerpoort Noord	Breng, TCR (only a couple of runs)	On evenings and weekends, this bus does not operate between Duiven Station and Centerpoort Noord.
66	Westervoort → Duiven Nieuwgraaf → Westervoort	Breng, TCR (only a couple of runs)	Rush hours only.
862	Arnhem Willemsplein → Westervoort → Duiven Station → Duiven Noord	Breng	Only two runs on Saturday late nights. A special tariff applies.
