= Wolfheze railway station =

Railway station in the Netherlands

Wolfheze
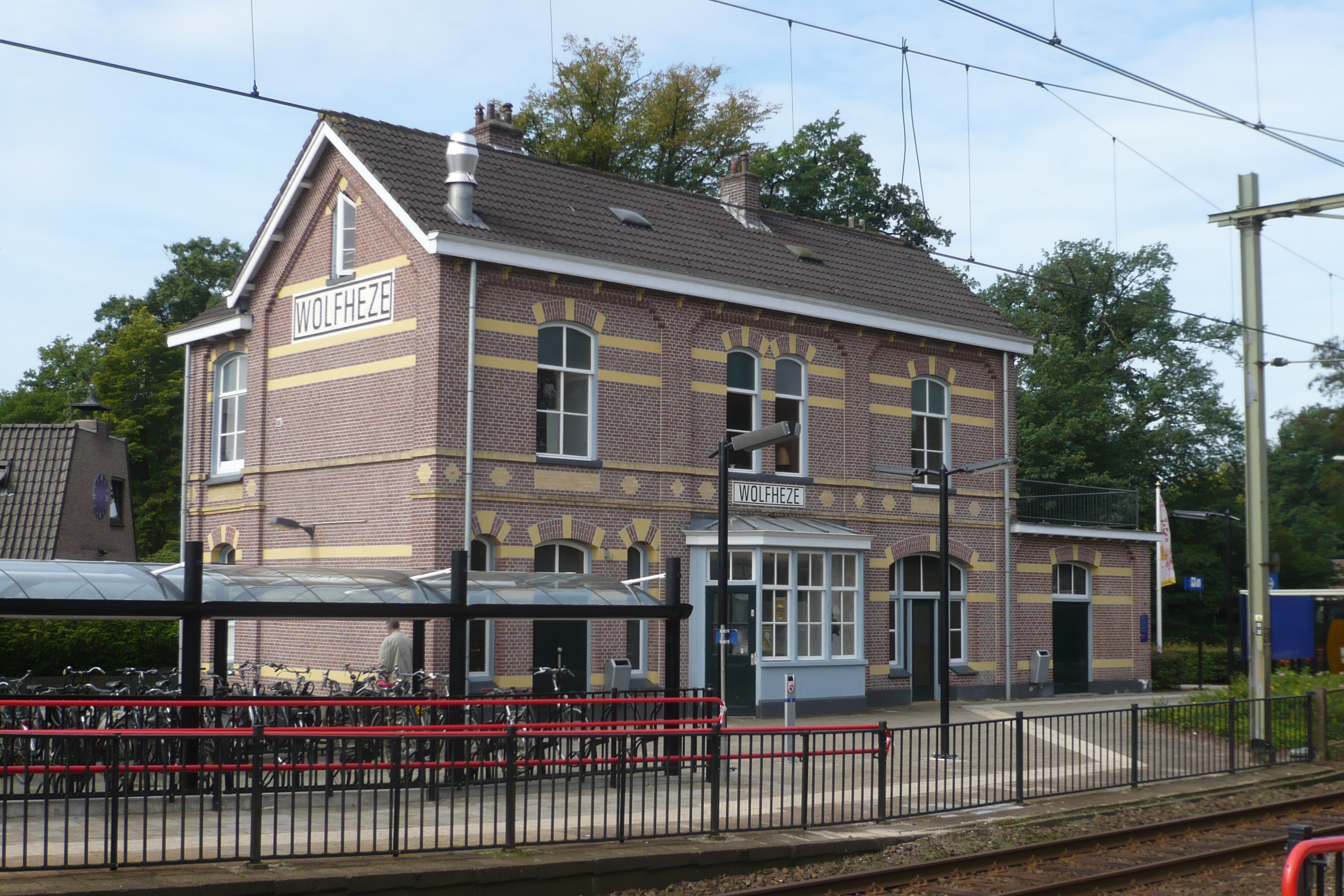

General information
- Location: Netherlands
- Coordinates: 52°00′20″N 5°47′32″E
- Line: Amsterdam–Arnhem railway

History
- Opened: 1845

Services
Preceding station	Nederlandse Spoorwegen	Following station
Ede-Wageningen Terminus	NS Sprinter 7500	Oosterbeek towards Arnhem Centraal
Location
- Location within Netherlands

Wolfheze is a railway station located in Wolfheze, Netherlands. The station opened in 1845 and is on the Amsterdam–Arnhem railway. The train service are operated by Nederlandse Spoorwegen.

== Train services ==
As of 11 December 2016, the following train services call at this station:

- Local Sprinter service: Ede-Wageningen - Arnhem
