= Duiven railway station =

Railway station located in Duiven, Netherlands

Duiven
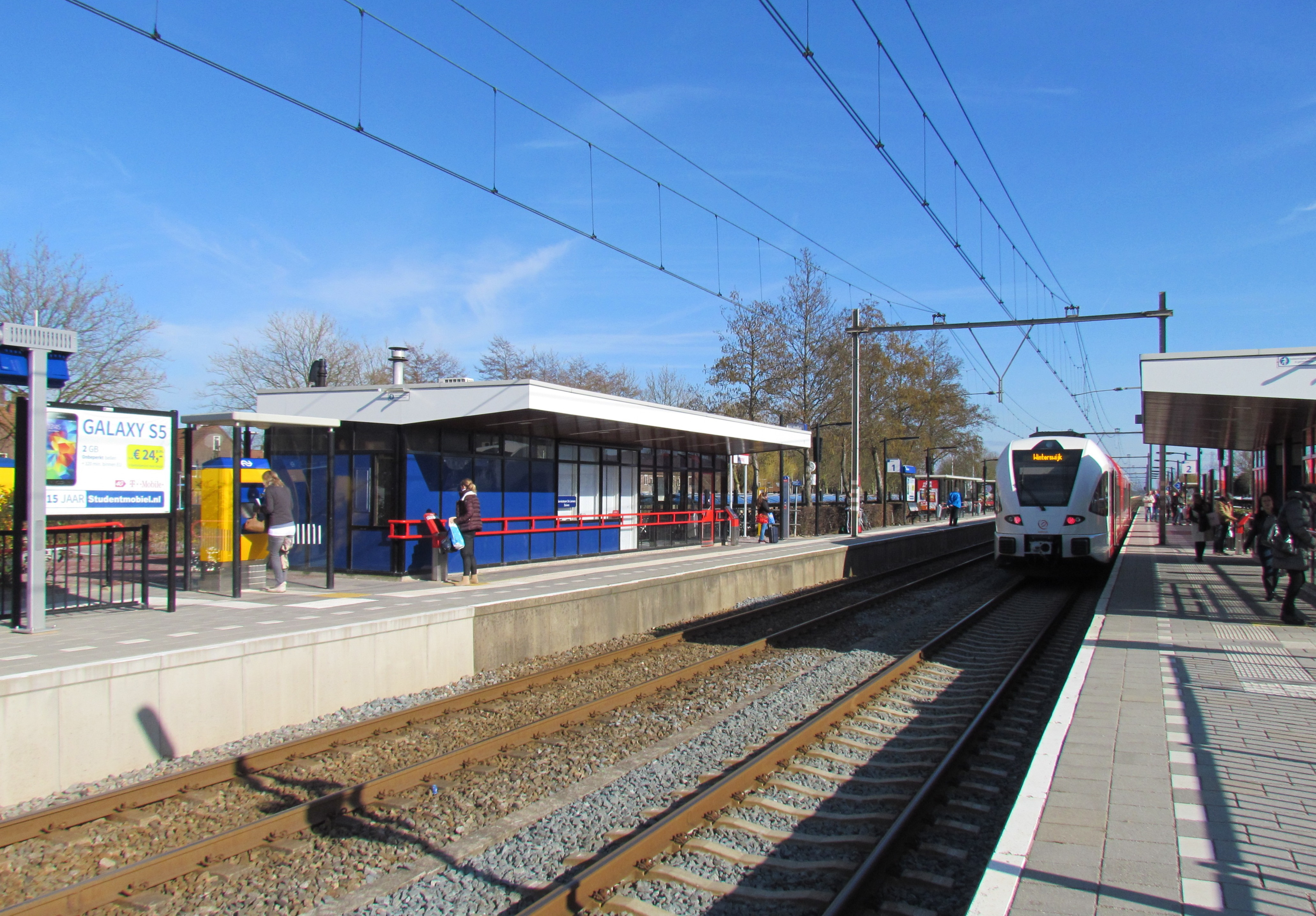

General information
- Location: Netherlands
- Coordinates: 51°56′36″N 6°00′51″E
- Line: Oberhausen–Arnhem railway

History
- Opened: 1856

Services
Preceding station	Breng	Following station
Westervoort towards Arnhem Centraal	Breng Stoptrein 30700	Zevenaar towards Doetinchem
Preceding station	Arriva Netherlands	Following station
Westervoort towards Arnhem Centraal	Stoptrein 30900	Zevenaar towards Winterswijk
Location
- Location within Netherlands

Duiven is a railway station located in Duiven, Netherlands. The station was opened on 15 February 1856 and is located on the Oberhausen–Arnhem railway between Arnhem and Elten (Germany). The train services at this station are operated by Arriva and Breng. The station was closed on 4 October 1936, but reopened on 31 May 1980. ICE services pass through this station at high speed.

== Train services ==
Route	Service type	Operator	Notes
Arnhem - Doetinchem - Winterswijk	Local ("Sprinter")	Arriva	2x per hour (only 1x per hour after 20:00, on Saturday mornings and Sundays)
Arnhem - Doetinchem	Local ("Sprinter")	Breng	2x per hour - Mon-Fri only. Not on evenings.

== Bus services ==
Line	Route	Operator	Notes
62	Arnhem CS - Westervoort - Duiven Station - Duiven Centerpoort Noord	Breng, TCR (only a couple of runs)	On evenings and weekends, this bus does not operate between Duiven Station and Centerpoort Noord.
862	Arnhem Willemsplein → Westervoort → Duiven Station → Duiven Noord	Breng	Only 2 runs on Saturday late nights. A special tariff applies.
