= Oosterbeek railway station =

Railway station in the Netherlands

Oosterbeek
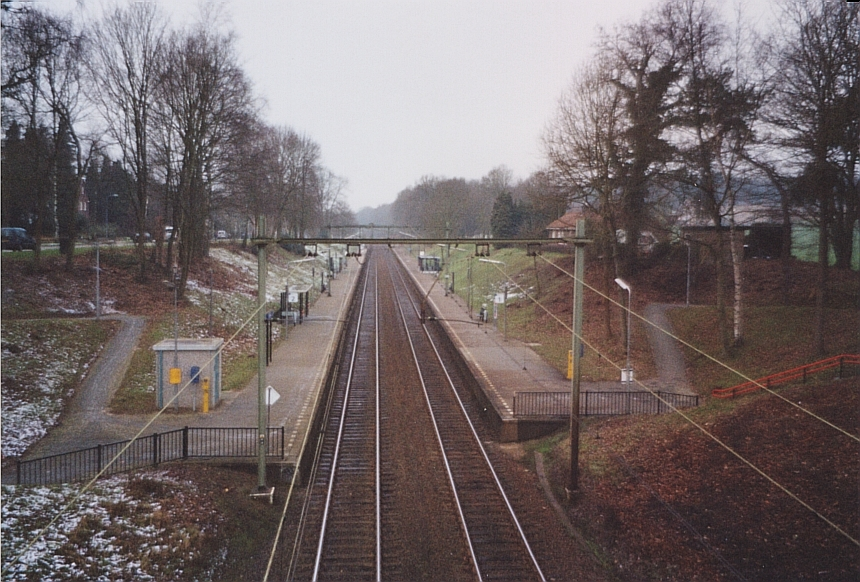

General information
- Location: Netherlands
- Coordinates: 51°59′41″N 5°50′24″E
- Line: Amsterdam–Arnhem railway

History
- Opened: 16 May 1845

Services
Preceding station	Nederlandse Spoorwegen	Following station
Wolfheze towards Ede-Wageningen	NS Sprinter 7500	Arnhem Centraal Terminus
Location
- Location within Netherlands

Oosterbeek is a railway station located in Oosterbeek, Netherlands. The station opened on 16 May 1845 and is on the Amsterdam–Arnhem railway (Rhijnspoorweg). The station was originally called Oosterbeek Hoog, as there was also a station called Oosterbeek Laag, meaning Lower Oosterbeek. This railway station was located on the Arnhem–Nijmegen railway. The station is the least used on the Amsterdam–Arnhem railway, with less than 600 passengers per day.

== Train services ==
As of 11 December 2016, the following train services call at this station:

- Local Sprinter service: Ede-Wageningen - Arnhem
