= Berkel (disambiguation) =

Berkel may refer to:

== People with the surname ==
- Ben van Berkel (born 1957), Dutch architect
- Christian Berkel (born 1957), German actor
- Gary J. Van Berkel, research scientist
- Tim Berkel (Timothy Peter Van Berkel) (born 1984), Australian triathlete

== Places ==
- The river Berkel in the east of the Netherlands
- The former village of Berkel (South Holland), now part of Berkel en Rodenrijs
- The former village of Berkel (North Brabant), now part of Berkel-Enschot
- Berkel (crater), a crater on Mercury

=== Railway stations ===
- Berkel-Enschot railway station
- Berkel Westpolder RandstadRail station
- Berkel railway station

== Other ==
- The Rosemary Berkel and Harry L. Crisp II Museum
- The Berkel meat slicer
- Avery Berkel, a manufacturer of weighing systems
