= Berkel-Enschot railway station =

Railway Station

Berkel-Enschot

General information
- Location: Netherlands
- Coordinates: 51°35′26″N 5°08′05″E
Location
- Location within Netherlands

Berkel-Enschot is a planned railway station between 's-Hertogenbosch and Tilburg.

A station operated here on the Tilburg–Nijmegen railway between 1881 and 1938. There were plans to reopen a station to relieve stress on other lines, but the motion was rejected in 2010. On November 28, 2014, it was announced that the station will certainly not be built before 2028.
