= Nijmegen railway station =

Railway station in Nijmegen, Netherlands

Nijmegen
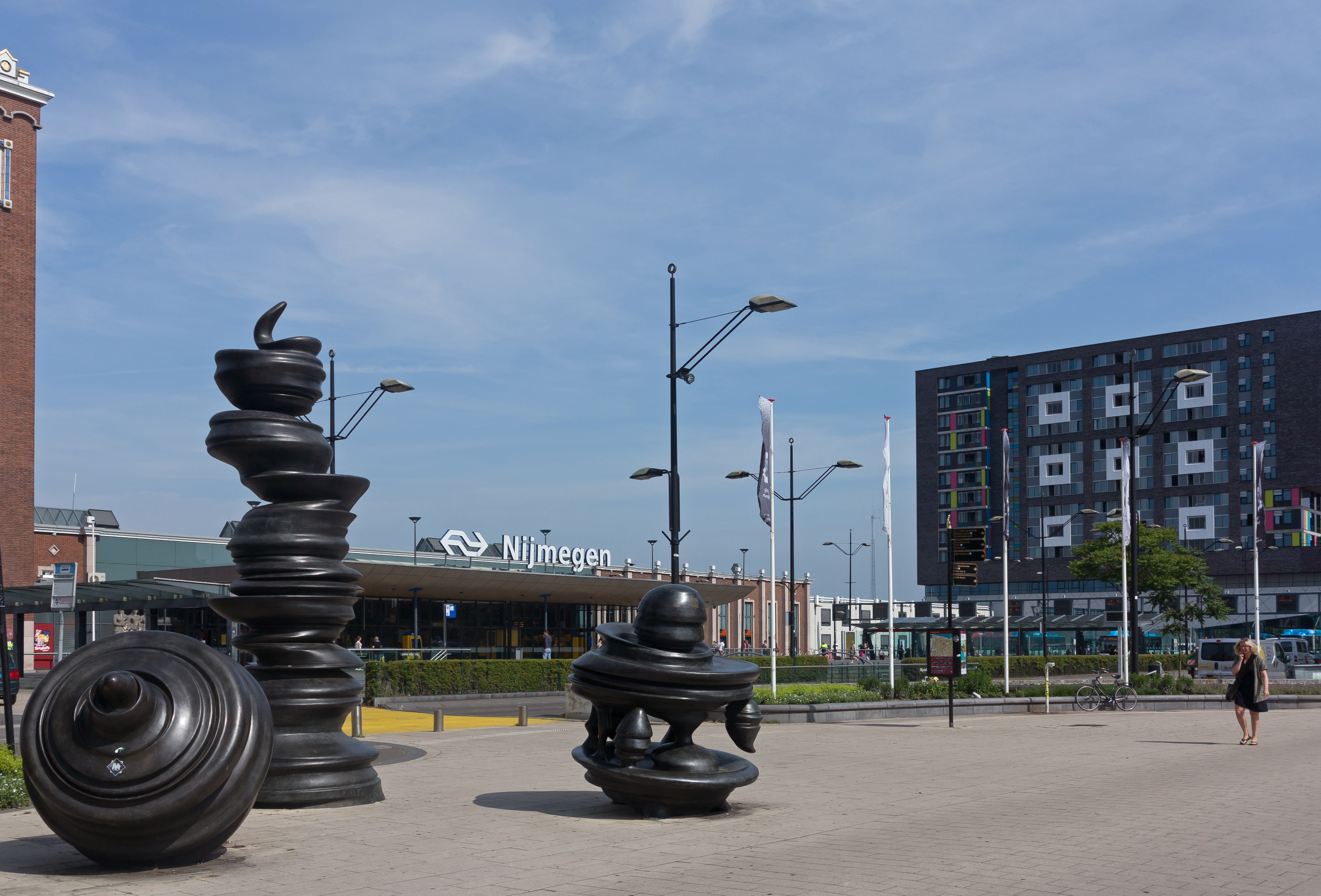

General information
- Location: Nijmegen, Gelderland, Netherlands
- Coordinates: 51°50′36″N 5°51′09″E
- Lines: Tilburg–Nijmegen railway Nijmegen–Venlo railway Arnhem–Nijmegen railway

Other information
- Fare zone: VRR: 600 (Note: VRR fares only apply to bus transport to and from Germany.)

History
- Opened: 9 August 1865; 161 years ago
Services
Preceding station	Nederlandse Spoorwegen	Following station
Arnhem Centraal towards Den Helder	NS Intercity 3000	Terminus
Arnhem Centraal towards Den Haag Centraal	NS Intercity 3100	Terminus
Arnhem Centraal towards Zwolle	NS Intercity 3600	Oss towards Roosendaal
Elst towards Utrecht Centraal	NS Nachtnet 21430 Fri/Sat night only	Terminus
Nijmegen Lent towards Arnhem Centraal	NS Sprinter 6600 Mon-Sat until 19:00	Nijmegen Goffert towards Dordrecht
Terminus	NS Sprinter 6600 After 19:00 and Sun	Nijmegen Goffert towards Dordrecht
Nijmegen Lent towards Zutphen	NS Sprinter 7600	Terminus
Preceding station	Arriva Netherlands	Following station
Terminus	Stoptrein 32200	Nijmegen Heyendaal towards Roermond
Terminus	Stoptrein 32300	Nijmegen Heyendaal towards Venray
Location
- Location within Netherlands

Nijmegen railway station is the main railway station of Nijmegen in Gelderland, Netherlands. It was opened on 9 August 1865 and is located on the Tilburg–Nijmegen railway, Nijmegen–Venlo railway and the Arnhem–Nijmegen railway. It was extensively rebuilt after the Second World War, as the original station had been severely damaged by a US bombing raid in February 1944 and during Operation Market Garden in September 1944. Until 1991 there was a line into Germany from here to Kleve.

The train services are operated by Nederlandse Spoorwegen and Arriva. The station is a central station for the whole area and is a busy interchange station.

== Train services ==
As of 11 December 2016, the following train services call at this station:

- Express services:
  - Intercity: Den Helder - Alkmaar - Amsterdam - Utrecht - Arnhem - Nijmegen
  - Intercity: Schiphol Airport - Utrecht - Arnhem - Nijmegen
  - Intercity: Zwolle - Deventer - Arnhem - Nijmegen Oss - 's-Hertogenbosch - Breda - Roosendaal
- Local services:
  - Sprinter: Arnhem - Nijmegen - Oss - 's-Hertogenbosch - Breda - Dordrecht
  - Sprinter: Zutphen - Arnhem - Nijmegen (- Wijchen)
  - Stoptrein: Nijmegen - Venlo - Roermond
  - Stoptrein: Nijmegen - Venray

== Bus services ==
KLM Royal Dutch Airlines operates a bus from the train station to Schiphol Airport for KLM customers.

There is also an express bus service SB 58, operated by the German company NIAG to the German towns of Kranenburg, Kleve and Emmerich. The bus can be used with both Dutch OV-chipkaarts and German Verkehrsverbund Rhein-Ruhr tickets on the whole length of the route.

Breng is the main operator of local and regional bus services in the region, while Arriva also has one service connecting Nijmegen with Limburg.
