= Keolis Nederland =

Dutch public transport company

- Type: Subsidiary
- Industry: Public transport
- Founded: 1999
- Founder: Nederlandse Spoorwegen Conexxion Cariane Multimodal International Under the name Syntus
- Headquarters: Deventer, Netherlands
- Area served: Gelderland, Overijssel, Utrecht Buiten, Almere
- Services: Bus and Train
- Revenue: €125 million
- Owner: Keolis
- Number of employees: 1,750
- Divisions: Keolis RRReis, Keolis Blauwnet
- Website: www.keolis.nl/

Logo of Syntus until 2016

Keolis Nederland is a public transport company operating bus and passenger train services in the Netherlands. Originally created as Syntus and owned by Connexxion, Keolis and Nederlandse Spoorwegen, since 2012 Keolis Nederland has been a 100% subsidiary of Keolis. Syntus is an acronym for Synergy between Train and Bus.

== History ==
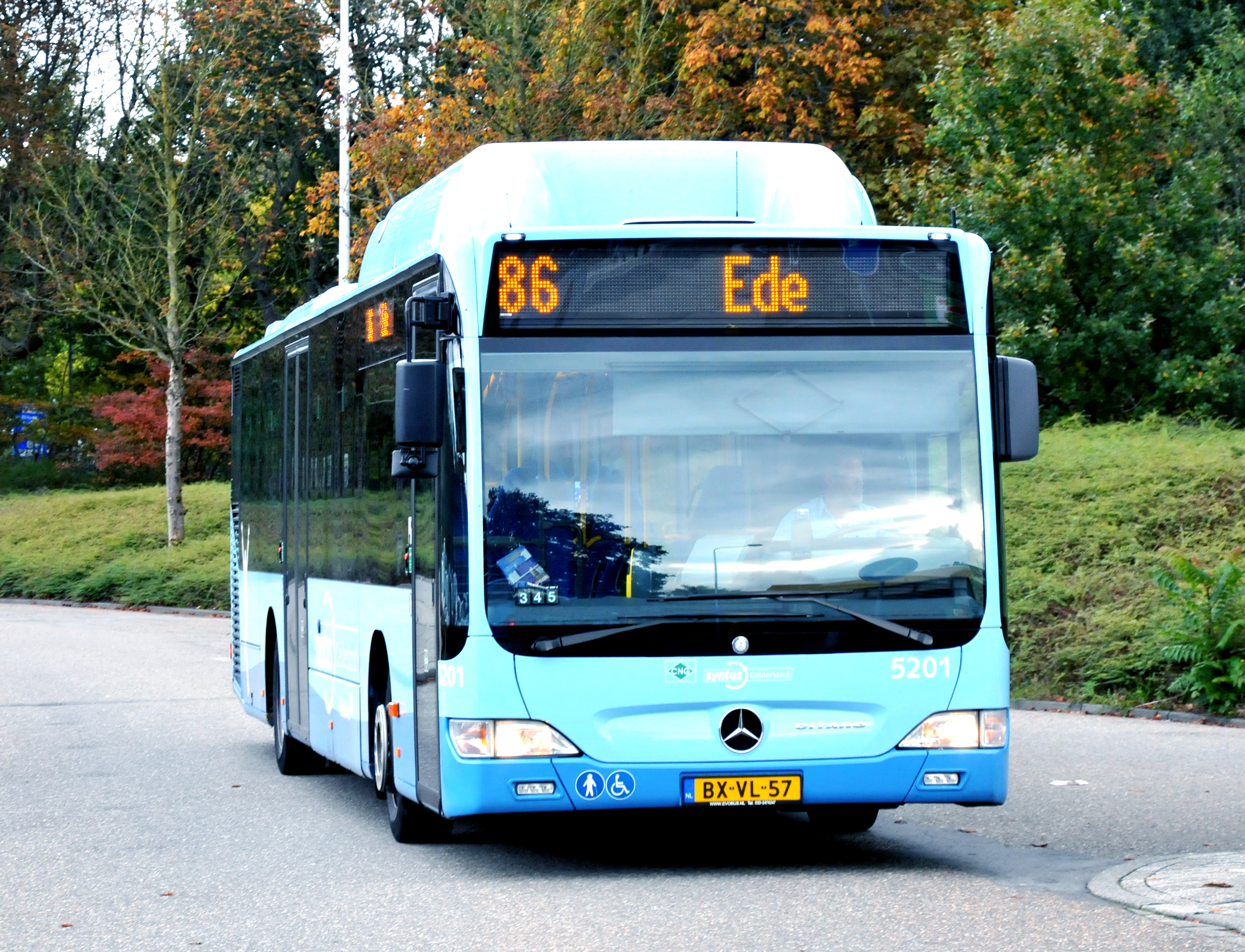
Mercedes-Benz Citaro in October 2012

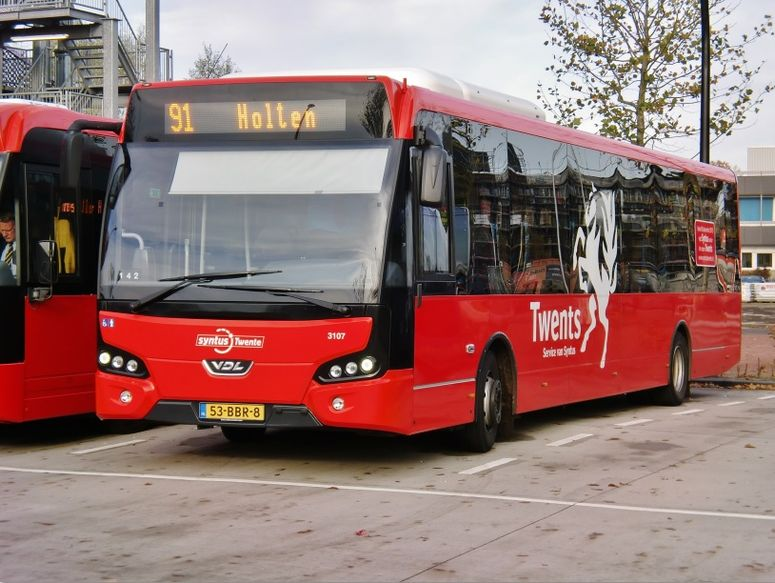
Syntus Twente VDL Citea in December 2013

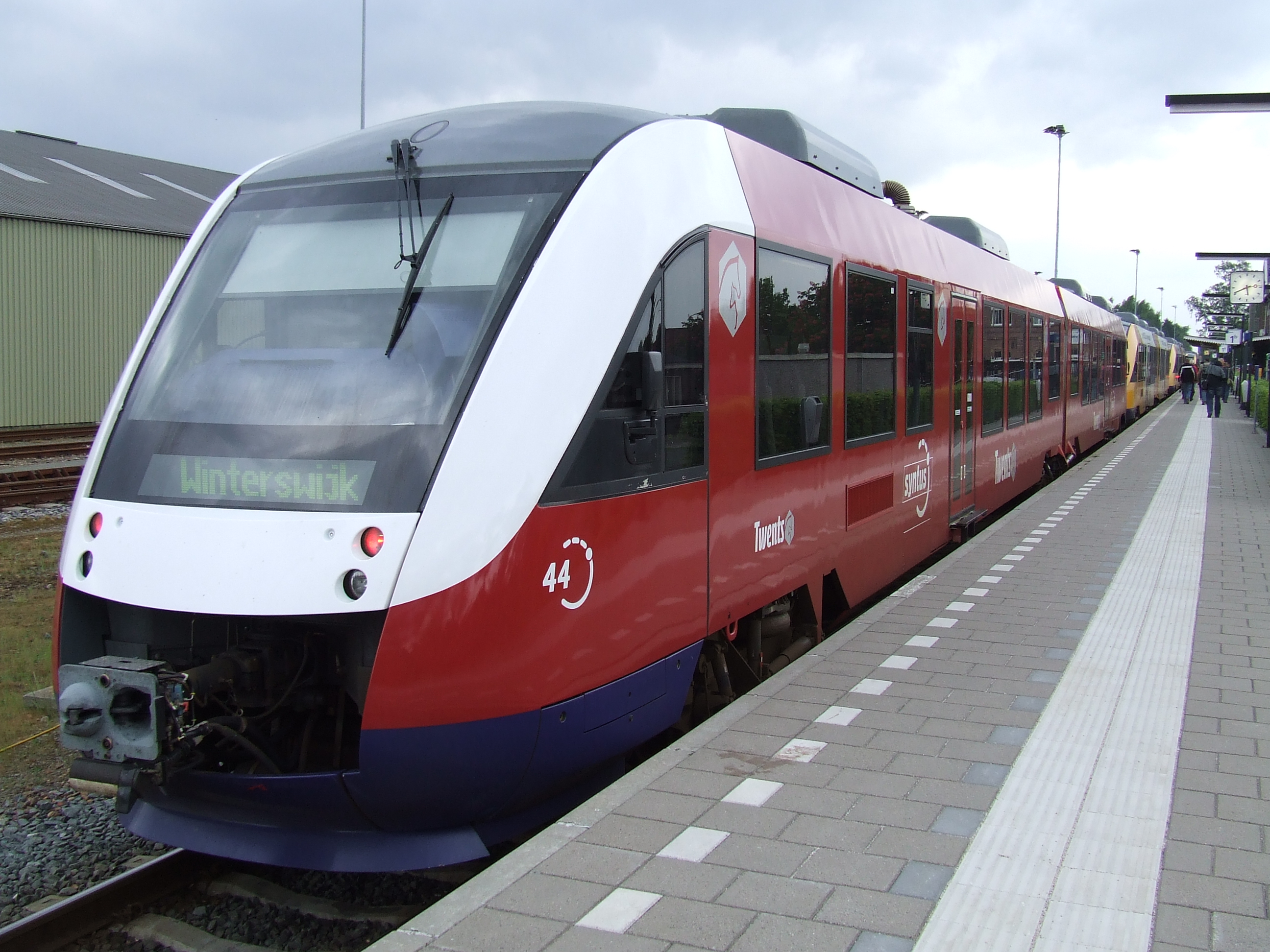
Syntus Twente Alstom Coradia LINT in May 2007

In 1991 Geldersche Streekvervoer Maatschappij (GSM) and the Dutch Railways started a transport integration project called Integratie Gelderland Oost. Integration between train and bus was the main goal. GSM later merged with Gemeentelijk Vervoerbedrijf Arnhem to form Gelderse Vervoersmaatschappij.

In 1999 Syntus commenced rail operations, Connexxion, Keolis and Nederlandse Spoorwegen each owning one-third. In 2007 Connexxion's share was purchased by Keolis and Nederlandse Spoorwegen. In 2012 Keolis purchased Nederlandse Spoorwegen's 50% share.

In October 2017, Syntus was rebranded Keolis Nederland with a new visual identity.

== Visgraatmodel ==
Syntus propagates synergy, which is based on a so-called 'visgraatmodel' (fish bone model). In this model train service represent the backbones. Bus services represent the spokes that feed train services. After a while other public transport companies like Arriva and Veolia Transport copied the model.

== Operations ==
In 2005, Syntus briefly operated a cross border service into Germany from Arnhem to Emmerich.

From December 2006 until December 2013, Syntus operated the Almelo to Mariënberg rail concession under sub-contract to Connexxion.

In August 2010, Syntus commenced an eight-year contract to operate services in Overijssel. In December 2010, it commenced a 10-year contract to operate services in Gelderland. In December 2016, it commenced a seven-year contract to operate services in Utrecht.

In December 2017, Keolis Nederland has commenced a ten-year contract to operate bus services in Almere. In the same month, it has commenced a 15-year contract to operate rail services in the province of Overijssel from Zwolle to Enschede and Zwolle to Kampen. These will be operated by 16 Stadler Flirts.

== Branding ==
Syntus' corporate identity consisted of the colors yellow, white and blue. Every region has its own identity incorporated in the corporate identity. The Syntus brand was retired in 2017 and replaced by the Keolis brand.

== Brands ==
Keolis operates under the U-OV brand in Utrecht Buiten, RRReis on the Valleilijn bewtween Amersfoort Centraal and Ede-Wageningen and Almere and under Blauwnet in Overijssel
