= Zutphen–Glanerbeek railway =

Railway line in the Netherlands

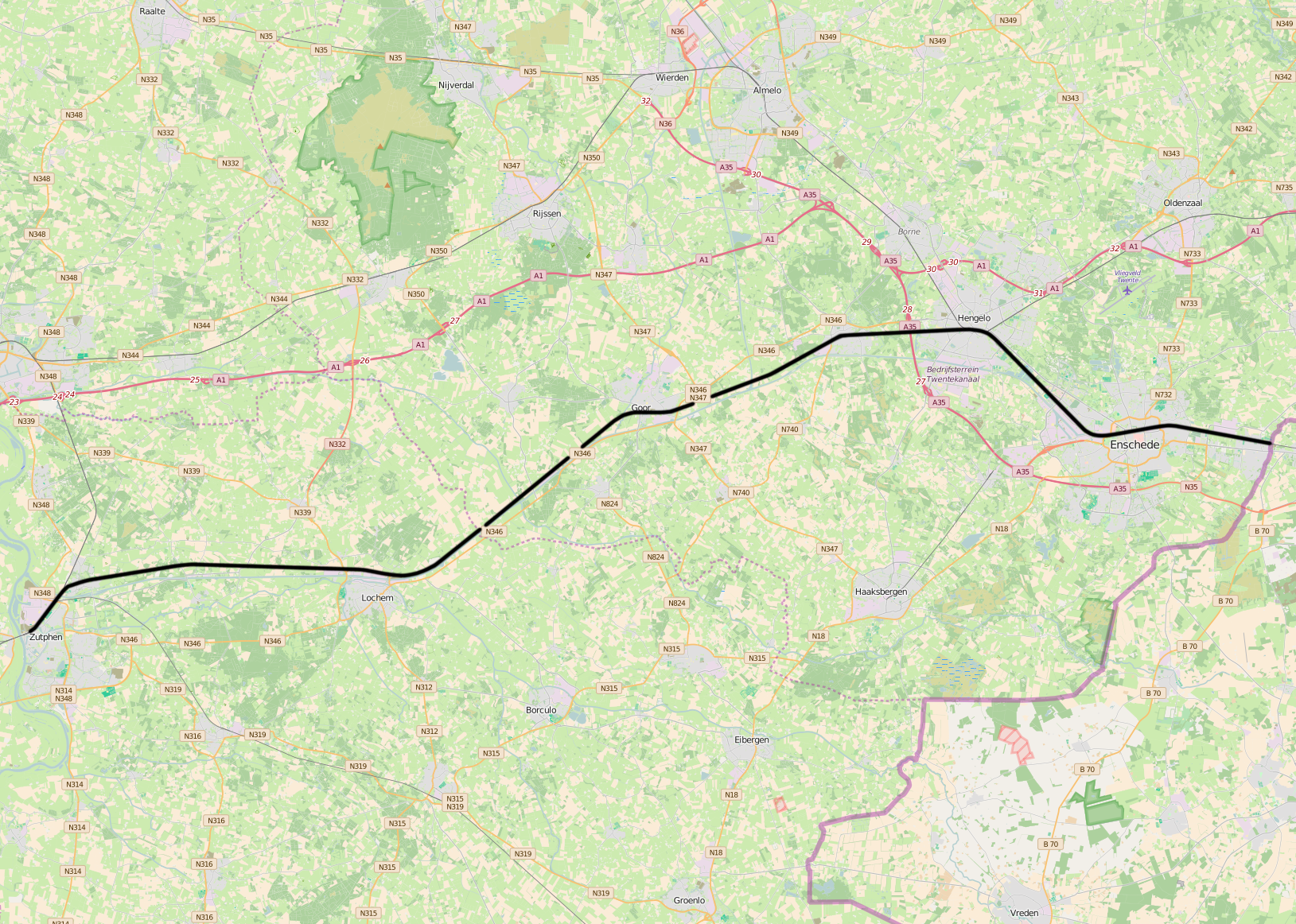

Overview
- Status: Operational
- Locale: Netherlands
- Termini: Zutphen railway station; Glanerbrug railway station

History
- Opened: 1865–1868

Technical
- Line length: 60 km (37 mi)
- Number of tracks: Zutphen–Hengelo single track, Hengelo-Enschede double track, Enschede–Glanerbrug single track
- Track gauge: 1,435 mm (4 ft 8 1/2 in) standard gauge
- Electrification: Hengelo-Enschede 1.5 kV DC

The Zutphen–Glanerbeek railway (Dutch: Staatslijn D) is a railway line in Gelderland and Overijssel, Netherlands running from Zutphen to the German border at Glanerbrug, passing through Hengelo and Enschede. It is the fourth Staatslijn; "Glanerbeek" is the former name for the Glanerbrug railway station. The line was opened between 1865 and 1868. The section between Enschede and the German border was closed for traffic in 1981, but it was reopened in 2001, although physically disconnected from the Dutch railway network; no Dutch train can enter this stretch and trains coming from Germany cannot enter the Dutch network through Enschede.

== Stations ==
The main interchange stations on the Zutphen–Glanerbeek railway are:

- Zutphen: to Arnhem, Deventer, Apeldoorn and Winterswijk
- Hengelo: to Almelo, Oldenzaal and Berlin
- Enschede: to Münster and Dortmund

== Train services ==
The following train services use part of the Zutphen–Glanerbeek railway:

- Intercity service Schiphol Airport – Amersfoort – Hengelo – Enschede
- Intercity service Den Haag Centraal/Rotterdam Centraal – Utrecht – Amersfoort – Hengelo – Enschede
- Local service (Stoptrein) Apeldoorn – Deventer – Almelo – Enschede
- Local service (Stoptrein) Nijverdal – Almelo – Enschede
- Local service (Stoptrein) Zutphen – Hengelo – Oldenzaal
- Local service (Regionalbahn) Enschede – Gronau – Coesfeld – Lünen – Dortmund
- Local service (Regionalbahn) Enschede – Gronau – Münster
