= Wijchen railway station =

Railway station in the Netherlands

Wijchen
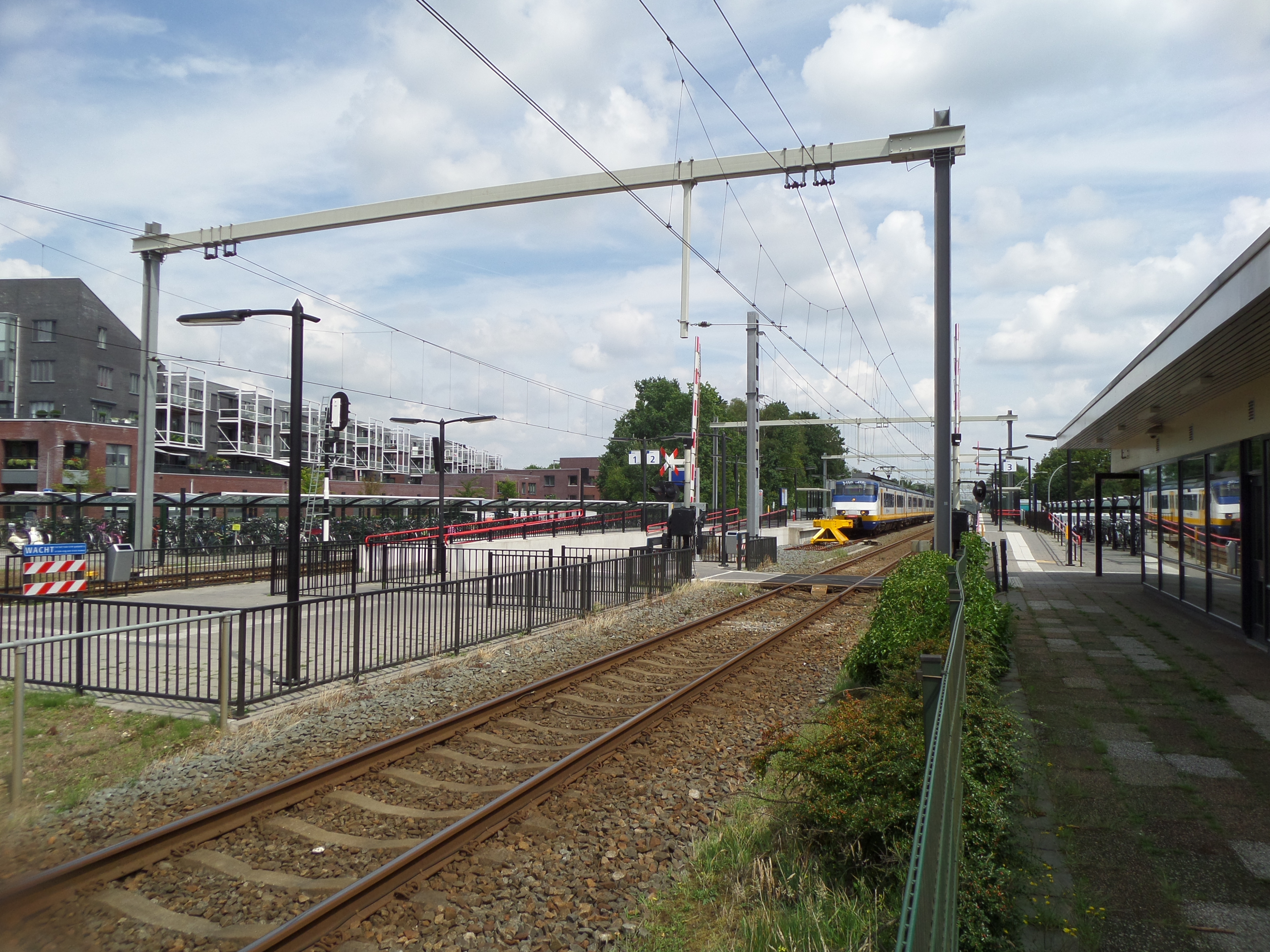

General information
- Location: Netherlands
- Coordinates: 51°48′40″N 5°43′46″E
- Line: Tilburg–Nijmegen railway

History
- Opened: 1881

Services
Preceding station	Nederlandse Spoorwegen	Following station
Ravenstein towards Dordrecht	NS Sprinter 6600 Mon-Sat until 19:00	Nijmegen Dukenburg towards Arnhem Centraal
Ravenstein towards Dordrecht	NS Sprinter 6600 After 19:00 and Sun	Nijmegen Dukenburg towards Nijmegen
Terminus	NS Sprinter 7600 Not on evenings and Sundays	Nijmegen Dukenburg towards Zutphen
Location
- Location within Netherlands

Wijchen is a railway station located in Wijchen, Netherlands. The station was opened in 1881 and is located on the Tilburg–Nijmegen railway. The train services are operated by Nederlandse Spoorwegen.

== Train services ==
The following services currently call at Wijchen:

- 2x per hour local services (stoptrein) (Arnhem Centraal -) Nijmegen - Oss - 's-Hertogenbosch
- 2x per hour local services (stoptrein) (Wijchen -) Nijmegen - Arnhem Centraal - Zutphen
