= Tilburg–Nijmegen railway =

Railway line in the Netherlands

Overview
- Status: Operational
- Locale: The Netherlands
- Termini: Tilburg railway station; Nijmegen railway station

Service
- Operator(s): Nederlandse Spoorwegen

History
- Opened: 1881

Technical
- Line length: 66 km (41 mi)
- Number of tracks: double track (except a single track bridge at Ravenstein)
- Track gauge: 1,435 mm (4 ft 8 1/2 in) standard gauge
- Electrification: 1.5 kV DC

The Tilburg–Nijmegen railway is a railway line in the Netherlands running from Tilburg to Nijmegen, passing through 's-Hertogenbosch. The line was opened in 1881.

== Stations ==
The main interchange stations on the Tilburg–Nijmegen railway are:

- Tilburg: to Breda and Eindhoven
- 's-Hertogenbosch: to Utrecht and Eindhoven
- Nijmegen: to Arnhem and Venlo

It has been proposed that the Berkel-Enschot railway station should be reconstructed, adding a station between 's-Hertogenbosch and Tilburg.
