= Arnhem–Nijmegen railway =

Railway line in the Netherlands

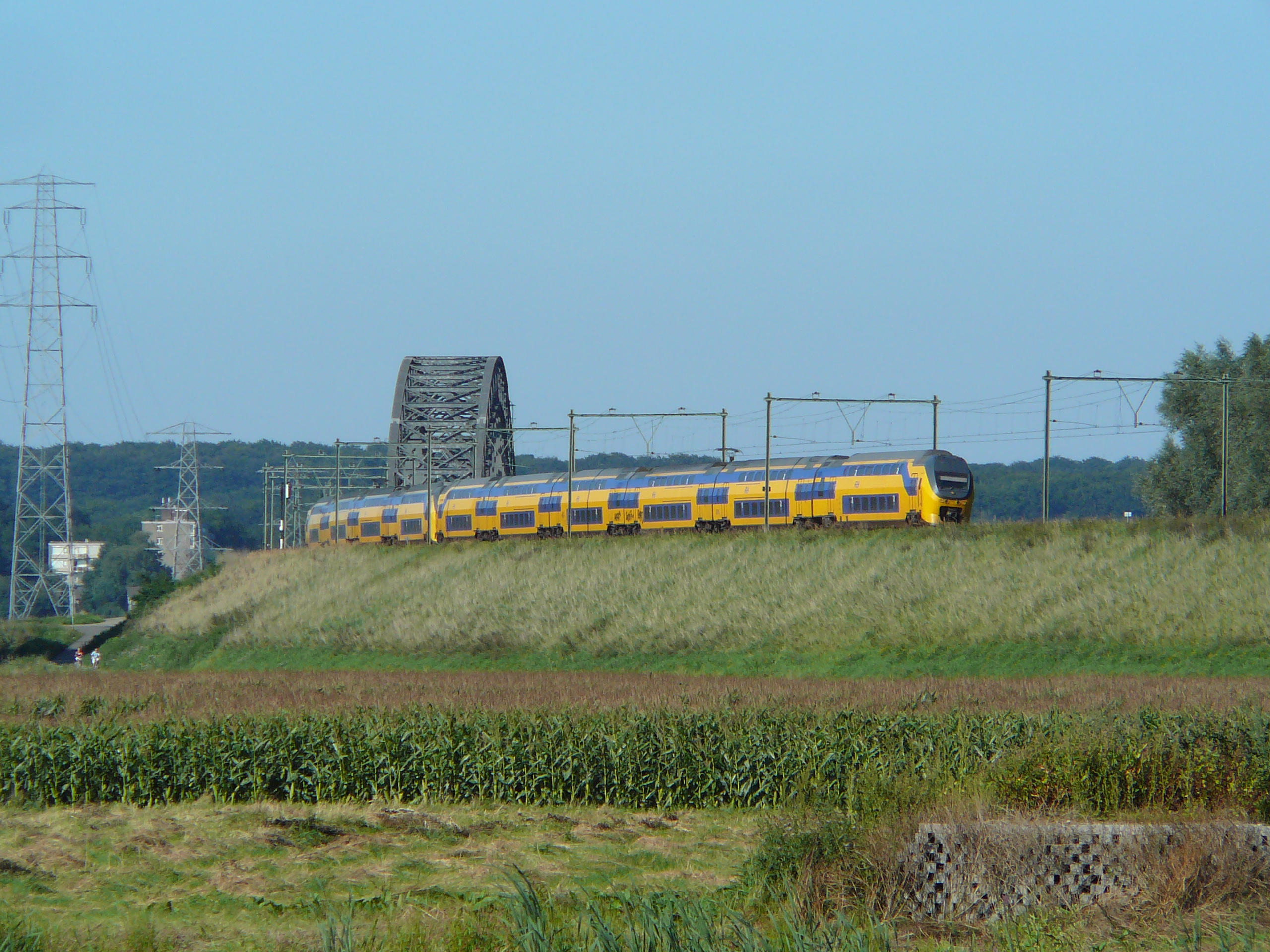

Overview
- Status: Operational
- Locale: Netherlands
- Termini: Arnhem Centraal railway station; Nijmegen railway station

Service
- Operator(s): Nederlandse Spoorwegen

History
- Opened: 1879

Technical
- Line length: 17 km (11 mi)
- Number of tracks: double track
- Track gauge: 1,435 mm (4 ft 8 1/2 in) standard gauge
- Electrification: 1.5 kV DC

The Arnhem–Nijmegen railway is a railway line in the Netherlands running from Arnhem to Nijmegen, passing through Elst. The line was opened in 1879. It crosses two branches of the river Rhine: the Nederrijn in Arnhem, and the Waal in Nijmegen.

== Stations ==
The main interchange stations on the Arnhem–Nijmegen railway are:

- Arnhem: to Amsterdam, Utrecht, Zutphen, Tiel and Oberhausen
- Nijmegen: to 's-Hertogenbosch and Venlo
