= Arnhem Centraal railway station =

Railway station in Arnhem, Netherlands

Arnhem Centraal
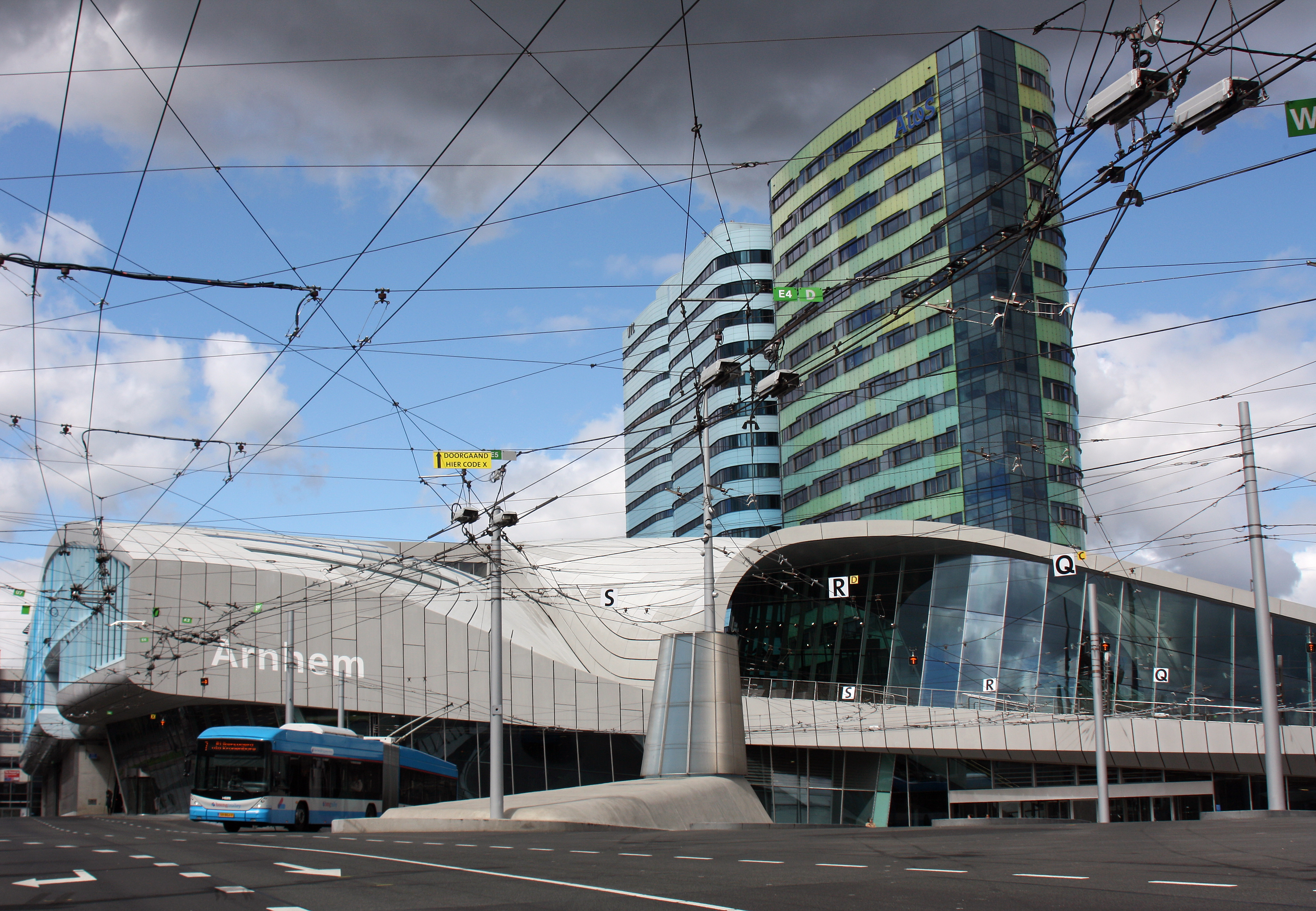
- The main building as of 2016

General information
- Location: Arnhem, Gelderland, Netherlands
- Coordinates: 51°59′5″N 5°54′3″E
- Owner: NS Stations
- Lines: Amsterdam–Arnhem railway Arnhem–Leeuwarden railway Arnhem–Nijmegen railway Oberhausen–Arnhem railway
- Platforms: 8
- Tracks: 11

Construction
- Platform levels: 2

History
- Opened: 14 May 1845
- Rebuilt: 2006-2015
- Electrified: 1938
Services
Preceding station	DB Fernverkehr	Following station
Utrecht Centraal towards Amsterdam Centraal	ICE 78	Oberhausen Hbf towards Frankfurt (Main) Hbf or München Hbf
Preceding station	Nederlandse Spoorwegen	Following station
Ede-Wageningen towards Den Helder	NS Intercity 3000	Reverses direction
Nijmegen Terminus	NS Intercity 3000	Reverses direction
Ede-Wageningen towards Den Haag Centraal	NS Intercity 3100	Reverses direction
Nijmegen Terminus	NS Intercity 3100	Reverses direction
Ede-Wageningen towards Rotterdam Centraal	NS Intercity 3200 Mon-Thur until 19:00	Terminus
Nijmegen towards Roosendaal	NS Intercity 3600	Dieren towards Zwolle
Ede-Wageningen towards Utrecht Centraal	NS Nachtnet 21430 Fri/Sat night only	Reverses direction
Elst towards Nijmegen	NS Nachtnet 21430 Fri/Sat night only	Reverses direction
Arnhem Zuid towards Dordrecht	NS Sprinter 6600 Mon-Sat until 19:00	Terminus
Oosterbeek towards Ede-Wageningen	NS Sprinter 7500	Terminus
Arnhem Zuid towards Wijchen	NS Sprinter 7600	Arnhem Velperpoort towards Zutphen
Preceding station	VIAS	Following station
Terminus	RE 19	Zevenaar towards Düsseldorf Hbf
Preceding station	Breng	Following station
Terminus	Breng Stoptrein 30700	Arnhem Velperpoort towards Doetinchem
Preceding station	Arriva Netherlands	Following station
Terminus	Stoptrein 30900	Arnhem Velperpoort towards Winterswijk
Elst towards Tiel	Stoptrein 31100	Terminus
Location
- Location within Netherlands

Arnhem Centraal railway station is the largest railway station in the city of Arnhem in Gelderland, Netherlands. It was opened on 14 May 1845 and is located on the Amsterdam–Arnhem railway, the Arnhem–Leeuwarden railway and the Arnhem–Nijmegen railway. The station opened at the same time as the Amsterdam–Arnhem railway, that continues into Germany via the Oberhausen–Arnhem railway.

The station is the main station of Arnhem, and at present, has around 40,000 passengers that use the station per day, this makes it the 9th busiest station in the Netherlands. The main building has a surface of 18,000 m2 and a volume of 76,000 m3, the building has a capacity of 110.000 transfers per day.

== Building ==
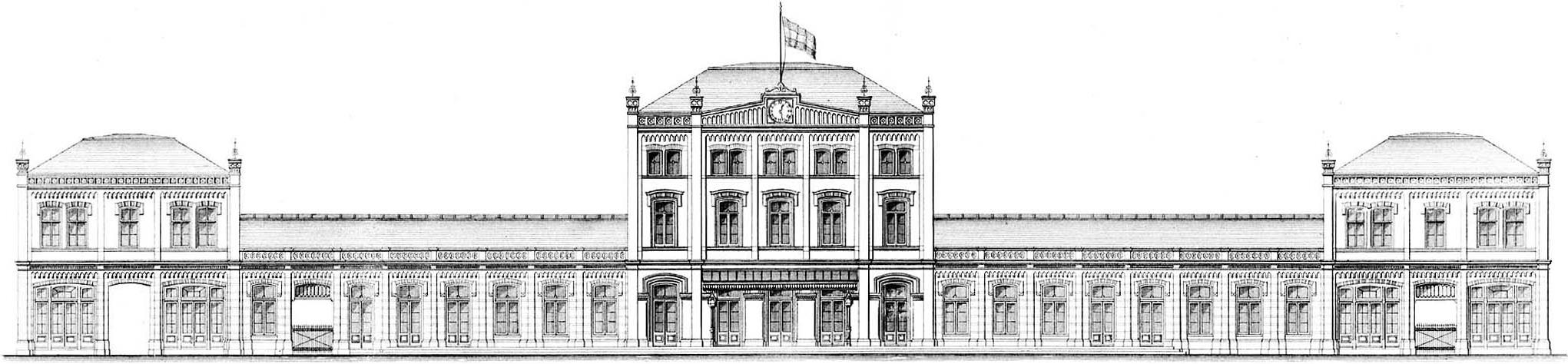
Former station building

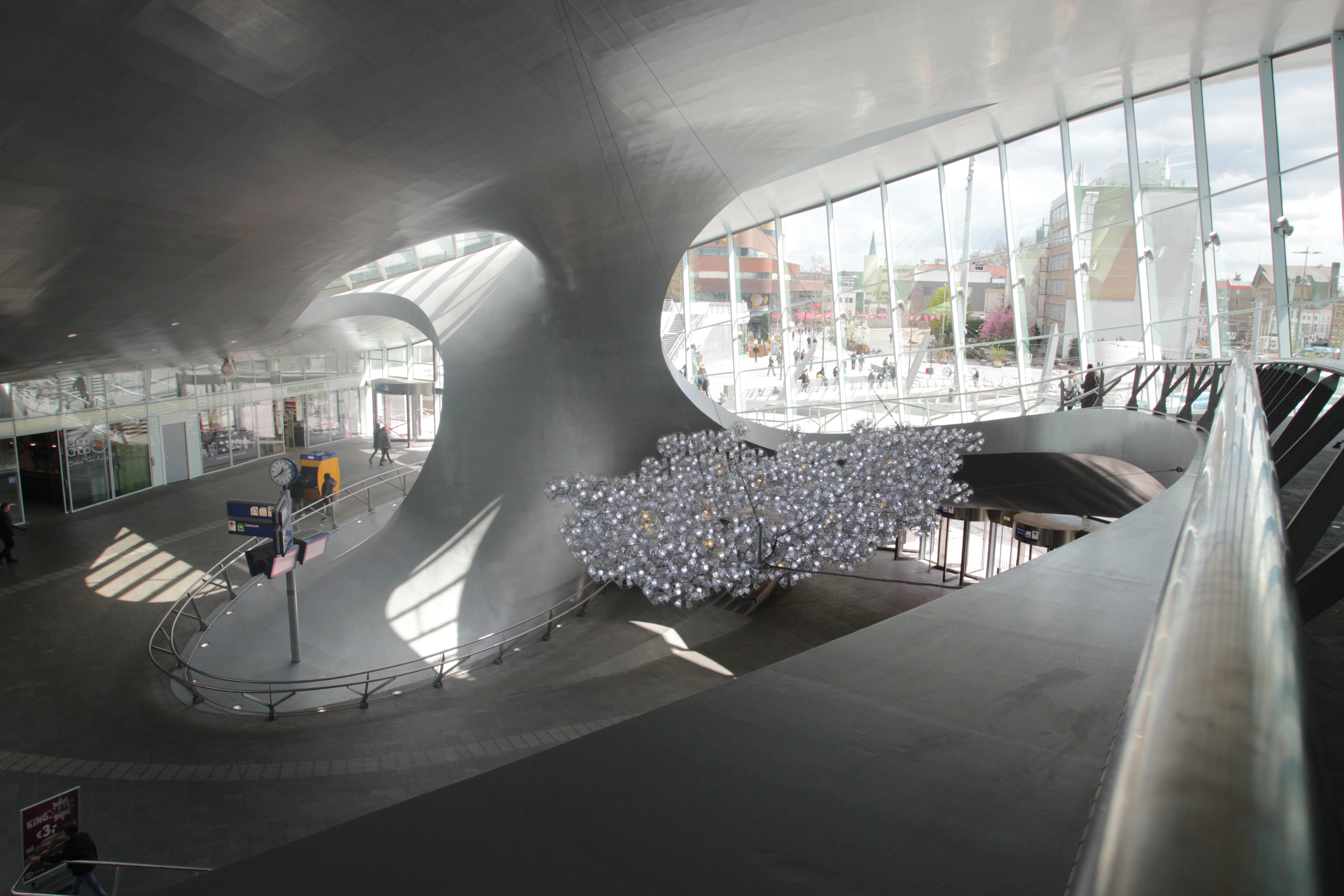
Entrance hall of the new station

In 2006 a reconstruction of the complete station area started. In October of that year, a temporary station entrance opened, that could only be reached by three sets of stairs (or by elevators). On 2 July 2011, a new tunnel under the platforms opened. The temporary entrance closed down and dismantled in the autumn of 2011. As of that period the railway consists of four platforms including a footbridge connecting all platforms.

During the summer of 2011 a new dive under was created west of the station which allows trains to Nijmegen and Utrecht to underpass all tracks without interfering the other train services. All traffic on the western part of the station was completely suspended for five weeks. The dive under officially opened on 29 August 2011. The official re-opening of the completed station was on 19 November 2015, on this day the station was renamed Arnhem Centraal, formerly it had just been Arnhem.

The new design of the railway station was created by UNStudio in collaboration with Cecil Balmond at Arup AGU. It won the Dutch Nationale Staalprijs.

== Train services ==
The station is served by the following train services:

- International:
  - Intercity-Express: Amsterdam - Utrecht - Arnhem - Cologne - Frankfurt Airport - Basel
  - Intercity-Express: Amsterdam - Utrecht - Arnhem - Cologne - Frankfurt
  - Regional Express: Arnhem - Emmerich - Wesel - Oberhausen - Duisburg - Düsseldorf
- National:
  - Express:
    - Intercity: Den Helder - Amsterdam - Utrecht - Arnhem - Nijmegen
    - Intercity: Schiphol - Utrecht - Arnhem - Nijmegen
    - Intercity: Zwolle - Arnhem - Nijmegen - Oss - 's-Hertogenbosch - Tilburg - Breda - Roosendaal
  - Local:
    - Sprinter: Arnhem - Nijmegen - Oss - 's-Hertogenbosch - Tilburg - Breda - Dordrecht
    - Sprinter: Ede-Wageningen - Arnhem
    - Sprinter: Zutphen - Arnhem - Nijmegen - Wijchen
    - Stoptrein: Arnhem - Zevenaar - Doetinchem
    - Stoptrein: Arnhem - Zevenaar - Doetinchem - Winterswijk
    - Stoptrein: Tiel - Elst - Arnhem

== Bus services ==
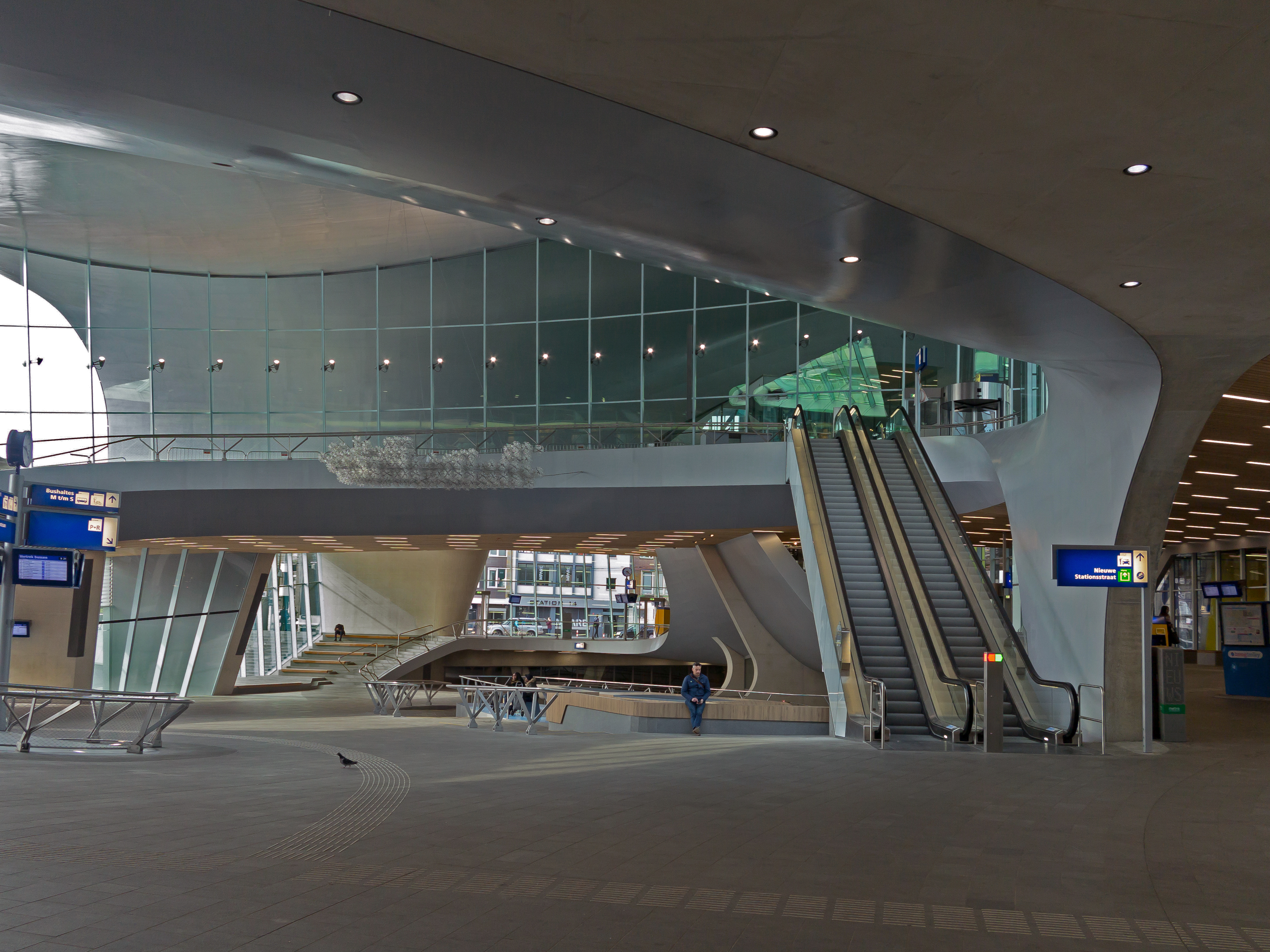
Stairs in the station building

The bus services depart from the covered bus station underneath the Essent towers and from the area in front of the main entrance. Arnhem is known for its trolleybus service in the Netherlands. They operate on a number of city services.

Bus services are operated by a variety of operators; city services are operated by Transdev under RRReis branding and regional services by Transdev and Arriva also under RRReis branding

KLM also operates a bus service for KLM customers from the train station to Schiphol Airport.

=== City services ===
- 1 De Laar West - Elderveld - Centraal Station (trolleybus)
- 2 Centraal Station - City Centre - Kronenburg (Shopping Mall) - De Laar West (trolleybus)
- 3 Het Duifje - City Centre - Centraal Station - Rijnstate (Hospital) - Alteveer - Burgers' Zoo (- Open Air Museum) (trolleybus)
- 5 Schuytgraaf - Station Arnhem Zuid - Elderveld - Centraal Station - City Centre - Presikhaaf (trolleybus)
- 7 Rijkerswoerd - Kronenburg (Shopping Mall) - Gelredome (Stadium) - Centraal Station - City Centre - Station Velperpoort - Geitenkamp (trolleybus)
- 9 Schaarsbergen I.P.C. - Hoogkamp - Centraal Station (trolleybus)
- 10 Centraal Station - Het Dorp
- 11 Centraal Station - Malburgen West - Vredenburg - Elden
- 12 Centraal Station - City Centre - Statenkwartier - IJsseloord
- 13 Centraal Station - City Centre - Klarendaal
- 110 Centraal Station - Papendal
- 127 Centraal Station - City Centre - Station Velperpoort - Presikhaaf West (trolleybus)
- 406 Centraal Station - Centrum - Velperpoort - HAN Arnhem (campus line, rush hour only)

=== Regional services ===
- 26 Arnhem - Presikhaaf - Velp - Giesbeek - Doesburg - Dieren
- 27 Arnhem - Presikhaaf - Velp - Giesbeek - Doesburg - Drempt - Hoog Keppel - Laag Keppel - Doetinchem
- 29 Arnhem - Velp - Rheden - Doesburg - Drempt - Hoog Keppel - Laag Keppel - Doetinchem
- 32 Arnhem - Huissen Bergerden (trolleybus)
- 33 Arnhem - Malburgen-Oost - Huissen - Angeren - Doornenburg - Gendt - Bemmel - Lent - Nijmegen
- 36 Arnhem - Driel - Heteren (trolleybus)
- 60 Arnhem - Westervoort - Duiven - Zevenaar - Babberich - Lobith - Tolkamer
- 62 Arnhem - Westervoort - Duiven (trolleybus)
- 103 Arnhem - Oosterbeek - Doorwerth - Heelsum - Renkum - Wageningen - Ede
- 105 Arnhem - Otterlo - Barneveld
- 300 Arnhem - Malburgen-Oost - Huissen - Bemmel - Nijmegen (Bus rapid transit service ComfortRRReis)
- 302 Velp - Presikhaaf - Arnhem - Beekbergen - Apeldoorn (Bus rapid transit service ComfortRRReis)
- 303 Velp - Arnhem - Oosterbeek - Doorwerth - Heelsum - Renkum - Wageningen - Ede (Trolleybus rapid transit service ComfortRRReis)
- 306 HAN Arnhem - Arnhem CS - Kronenburg - Elst - Nijmegen - Heijendaal Campus (Trolleybus rapid transit service ComfortRRReis)
