= Zutphen railway station =

Railway station in the Netherlands

Zutphen
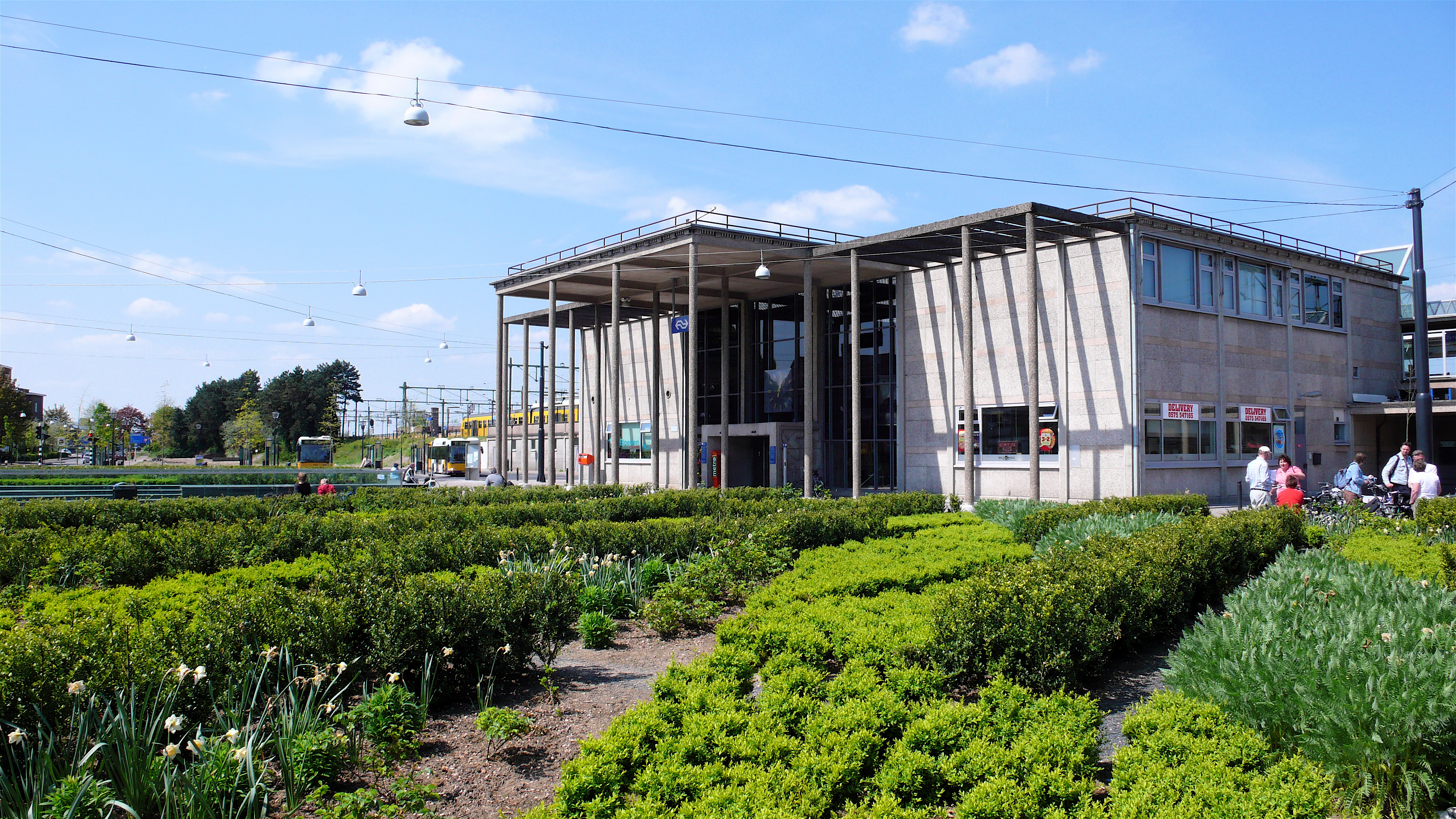

General information
- Location: Netherlands
- Coordinates: 52°08′40″N 6°11′38″E
- Lines: Arnhem–Leeuwarden railway Zutphen–Glanerbeek railway Amsterdam–Zutphen railway Zutphen–Winterswijk railway

History
- Opened: 1865
Services
Preceding station	Nederlandse Spoorwegen	Following station
Dieren towards Roosendaal	NS Intercity 3600	Deventer towards Zwolle
Brummen towards Wijchen	NS Sprinter 7600	Terminus
Preceding station	Arriva Netherlands	Following station
Voorst-Empe towards Apeldoorn	Stoptrein 17800	Terminus
Terminus	Stoptrein 30800	Vorden towards Winterswijk
Preceding station	Syntus	Following station
Terminus	Stoptrein 31200	Lochem towards Oldenzaal
Location
- Location within Netherlands

Zutphen is a railway station located in Zutphen, Netherlands. The station was opened on 2 February 1865, rebuilt after the Second World War and is located on the Arnhem–Leeuwarden railway, Zutphen–Glanerbeek railway, Amsterdam–Zutphen railway and the Zutphen–Winterswijk railway. The services are operated by Nederlandse Spoorwegen, and Arriva. The station is an important regional hub, with three local lines and one express line meeting in Zutphen.

== Train services ==
Route	Service type	Operator	Notes
Zwolle - Deventer - Zutphen - Nijmegen - Roosendaal	Intercity 3600	NS	2x per hour in each direction, only stops at Intercity stations.
(Wijchen -) Nijmegen - Arnhem - Zutphen	Local (Sprinter 7600)	NS	2x per hour - 1x per hour after 21:00 and on Sundays, stops at all intermediate stations.
Apeldoorn - Zutphen	Local (Stoptrein RS30)	Arriva	2x per hour, stops at all intermediate stations.
Zutphen - Winterswijk	Local (Stoptrein RS31)	Arriva	2x per hour - 1x per hour on evenings, Saturday mornings and Sundays, stops at all intermediate stations.
Zutphen - Hengelo - Oldenzaal	Local (Stoptrein RS24)	Keolis (From December 10th Arriva	2x per hour - 1x per hour late nights and Sundays before 14:00), stops at all intermediate stations.
Apeldoorn - Zutphen - Winterswijk	Local (Sneltrein RE30)	Arriva	Only runs on weekends and evenings, stops at all stations between Zutphen and Winterswijk

== Bus services ==
Line	Route	Operator	Notes
58	Zutphen - Warnsveld - Eefde - Almen - Lochem - Barchem - Borculo	Arriva	Not on weekends.
81	Zutphen - Eefde - Gorssel - Epse - Deventer	Arriva	
82	Doetinchem - Langerak - Laag-Keppel - Hummelo - Toldijk - Steenderen - Baak - Warnsveld - Zutphen	Arriva	
83	Zutphen - Warnsveld - Zutphen	Arriva	
84	Zutphen Station - Zutphen Zuidwijken - Zutphen Station	Arriva	
193	Zutphen - Warnsveld - Vierakker - Wichmond (- Vorden)	Arriva	Partly on Saturdays, entirely on Sundays and on weekdays evenings, this bus only operates when called one hour before its supposed departure ("belbus").
504	Eerbeek - Hall - Tonden - Oeken - Zutphen	EBS under the name of RRReis	During weekdays, this bus operates until 20:00; on Saturdays during daytime hours only. Not on Sundays.
515	Zutphen - Brummen - Leuvenheim	EBS under the name of RRReis	Not on evenings and Sundays.
682	Zutphen - Warnsveld - Baak - Steenderen - Toldijk - Hummelo - Laag-Keppel - Langerak - Doetinchem	Arriva	Only 1 run in both directions during morning rush hour.
880	Zutphen Station → Zutphen Centrum (Downtown) → Zutphen Zuidwijken → Zutphen Gelre Ziekenhuis (Hospital) → Warnsveld Drieumme → Warnsveld Leesten → Warnsveld GGNet → Zutphen Station	Arriva	Only operates after 21:00 (7 days a week). Can freely be used from Zutphen Station onwards, but needs to be called one hour before its supposed departure ("belbus") when traveling from other bus stops along the route.
