= Almelo de Riet railway station =

Railway station in the Netherlands

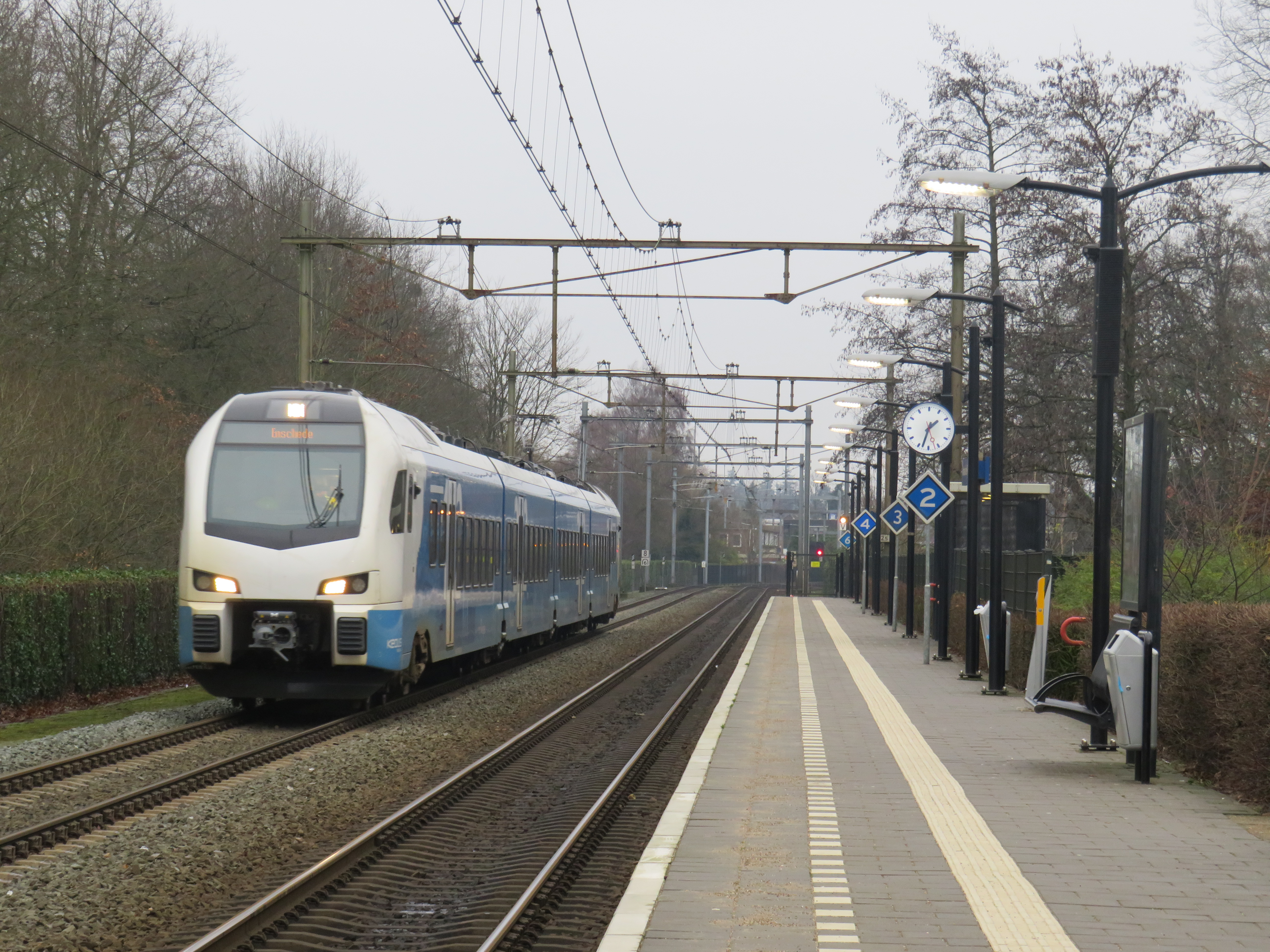
- Keolis FLIRT EMU at Almelo de Riet

General information
- Location: Netherlands
- Coordinates: 52°20′31″N 6°40′00″E
- Line: Almelo–Salzbergen railway

Other information
- Station code: Amri

History
- Opened: 3 October 1926

Services
Preceding station	Nederlandse Spoorwegen	Following station
Almelo towards Apeldoorn	NS Sprinter 7000	Borne towards Enschede
Preceding station	Keolis Nederland	Following station
Almelo towards Zwolle	Sprinter 7900	Borne towards Enschede
Location
- Location within Netherlands

Almelo de Riet is a railway station in Almelo, Netherlands. The station was opened on 3 October 1926 and is located on the Almelo-Salzbergen railway line. Previously, the station was simply called De Riet from 1926 to 1965.

== Train services ==
Route	Service type	Operator	Notes
Apeldoorn - Deventer - Almelo (- Enschede)	Local ("Sprinter")	NS	Rush hours only.
Zwolle - Almelo - Hengelo - Enschede	Local ("Stoptrein")	Keolis Nederland	2x per hour

== Bus services ==
There is no bus service at this station.
