= Hengelo railway station =

Railway station in the Netherlands

Station Hengelo
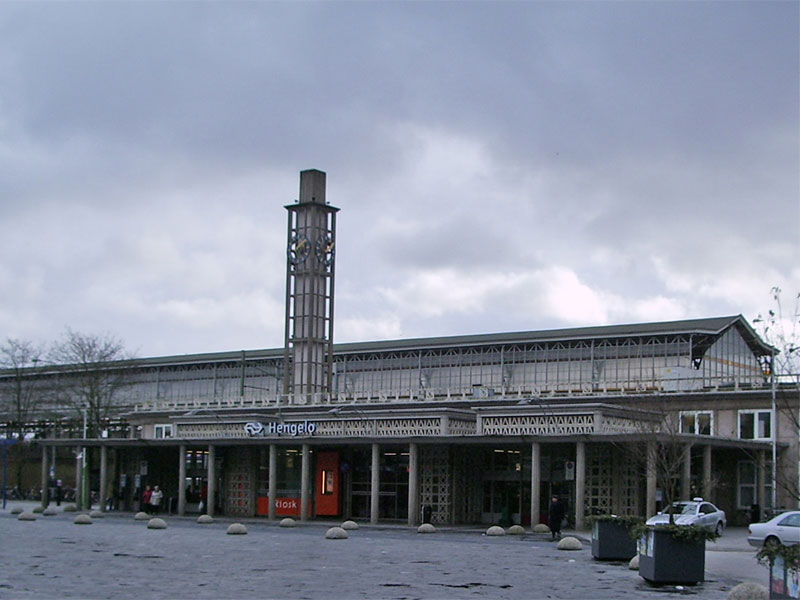

General information
- Location: Netherlands
- Coordinates: 52°15′43″N 6°47′39″E
- Lines: Almelo–Salzbergen railway Zutphen–Glanerbeek railway
- Platforms: 3

Other information
- Station code: Hgl

History
- Opened: 1865
Services
Preceding station	DB Fernverkehr	Following station
Deventer towards Amsterdam Centraal	ICE 77	Bad Bentheim towards Berlin Ostbahnhof
Preceding station		Following station
Terminus	RB 61	Oldenzaal towards Bielefeld Hbf
Preceding station	Nederlandse Spoorwegen	Following station
Almelo towards Den Haag Centraal	NS Intercity 1700 Until 20:00	Enschede Terminus
Almelo towards Rotterdam Centraal	NS Intercity 1700 After 20:00	Enschede Terminus
Borne towards Apeldoorn	NS Sprinter 7000	Enschede Kennispark towards Enschede
Preceding station	Keolis Nederland	Following station
Borne towards Zwolle	Sprinter 7900	Enschede Kennispark towards Enschede
Almelo towards Zwolle	Intercity 17900 Not on evenings or weekends	Enschede Terminus
Preceding station	Arriva Netherlands	Following station
Hengelo Gezondheidspark towards Zutphen	Stoptrein 31200	Hengelo Oost towards Oldenzaal
Location
- Location within Netherlands

Hengelo is a railway station in Hengelo, Netherlands. The station was opened on 18 October 1865 and is on the Almelo–Salzbergen railway and the Zutphen–Glanerbeek railway. It underwent a major renovation in 2010.

== Train services ==
As of 5 March 2022, the following services call at the station:

- 7 daily Intercity services Amsterdam – Amersfoort – Hengelo – Osnabrück – Hanover – Berlin
- 1× per hour express Intercity service: Schiphol – Amersfoort – Hengelo – Enschede
- 1× per hour express Intercity service: The Hague – Utrecht – Amersfoort – Hengelo – Enschede
- 2× per hour local Sprinter service: Apeldoorn – Deventer – Almelo – Hengelo – Enschede
- 3x per hour local Sprinter service: Zwolle – Almelo – Hengelo – Enschede
- 2× per hour local Stoptrein service: Zutphen – Hengelo – Oldenzaal

In March 2026 GoVolta services began calling.

== Facilities ==
Hengelo has some facilities which are located underneath the platforms, such as an Albert Heijn to Go, Kiosk, Döner Company and a Subway.

== Platforms ==
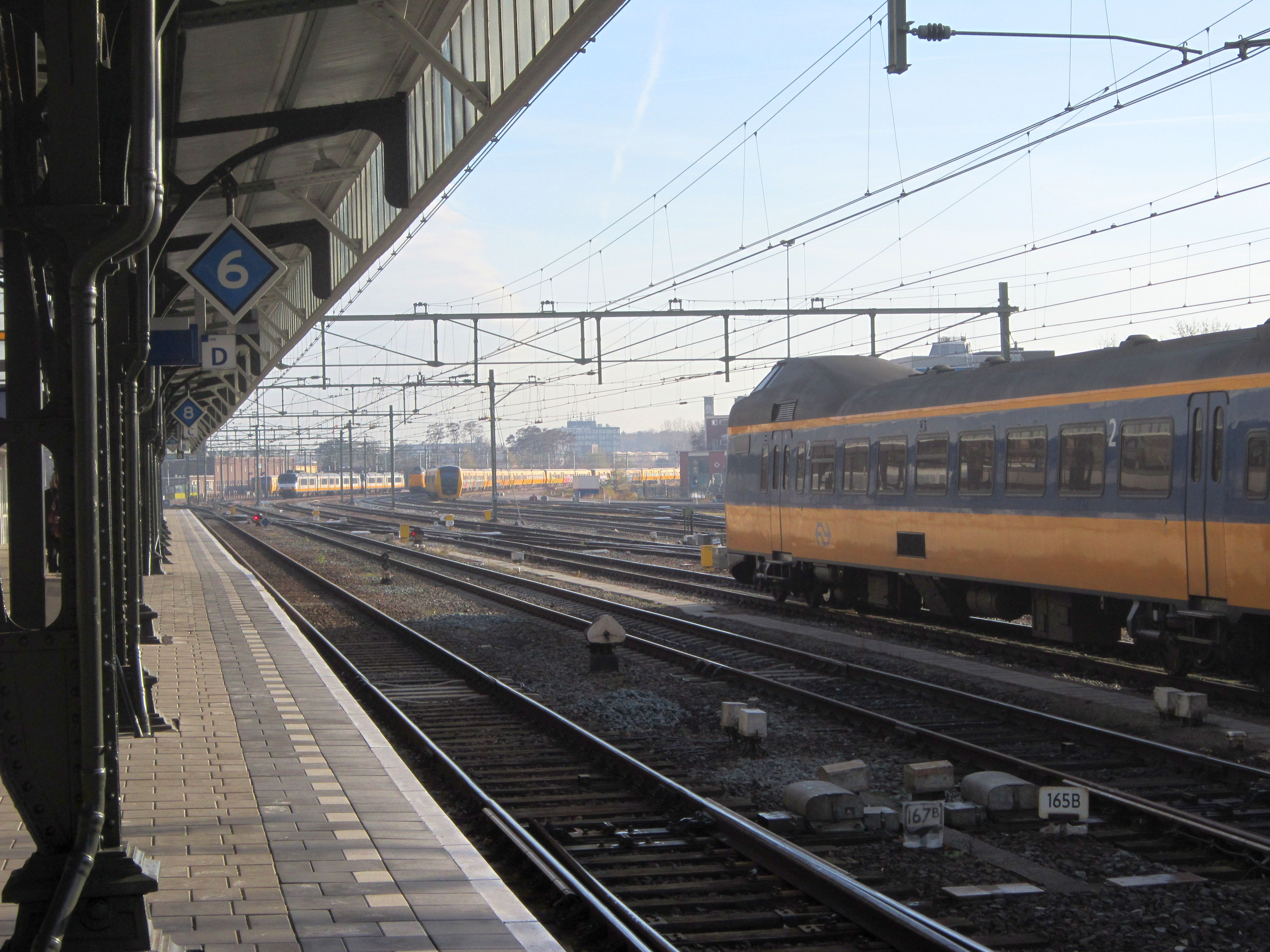
One of the station platforms

Hengelo has three platforms, 2, 3, and 11. Platform 11 is located at the end of the station, between platform 2 and 3, and is used for regional trains to Bad Bentheim and Bielefeld.

== Bus services ==
- 9 Enschede – Twente University – Hengelo
- 10 Hengelo – Veldwijk
- 11 Station – Hasselo
- 12 Station – Groot Driene
- 13 Station – Hengelose Es – Vossenbelt – Hasselo
- 14 Station – Woolder Es – Gezondheidspark
- 51 Almelo – Zenderen – Borne – Hengelo
- 53 Hengelo – Beckum – Haaksbergen
- 65 Hengelo – Deurningen – Weerselo – Fleringen – Tubbergen

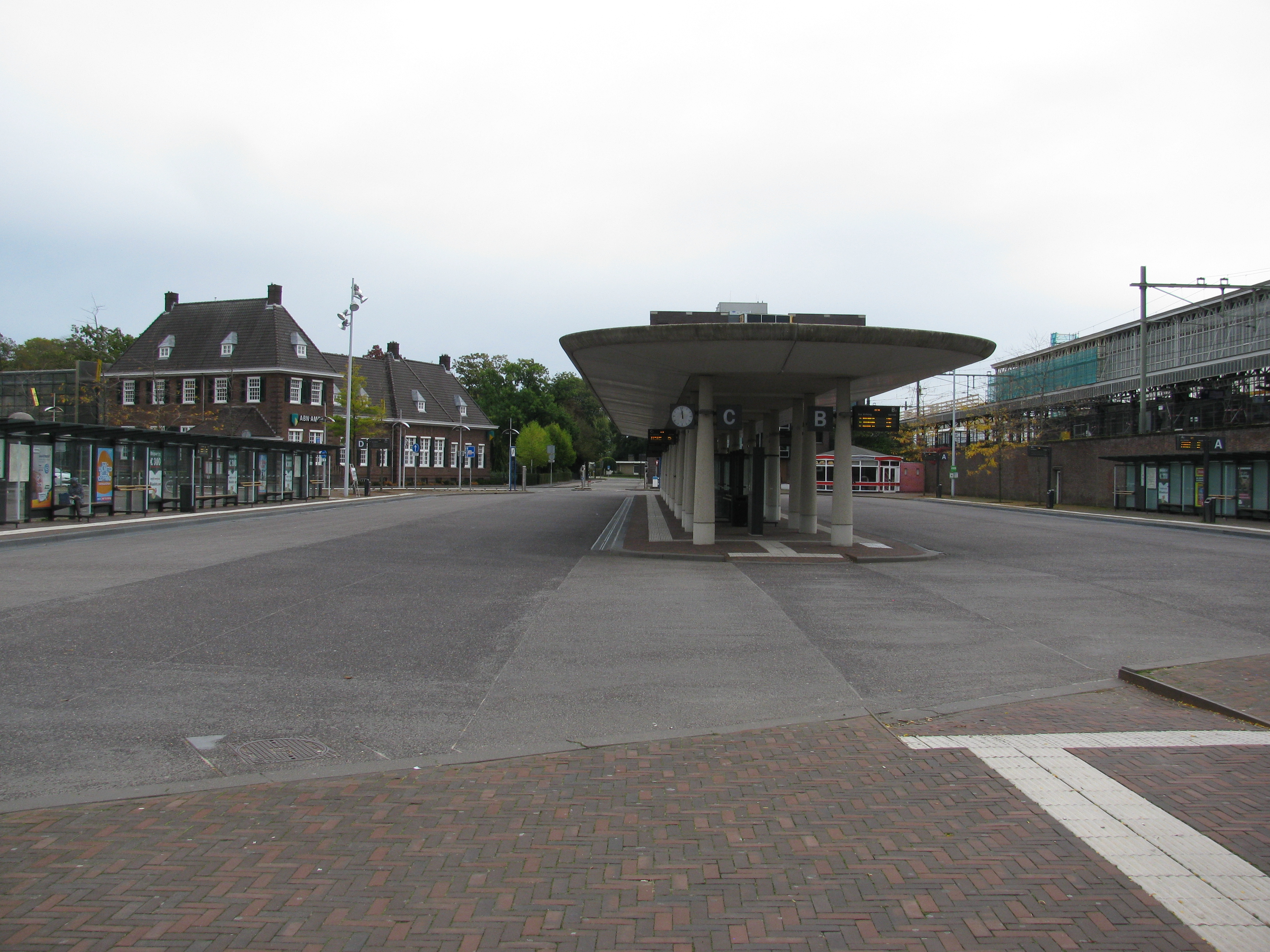
The bus station at Hengelo railway station
