= Borne railway station =

Railway station in the Netherlands

Borne
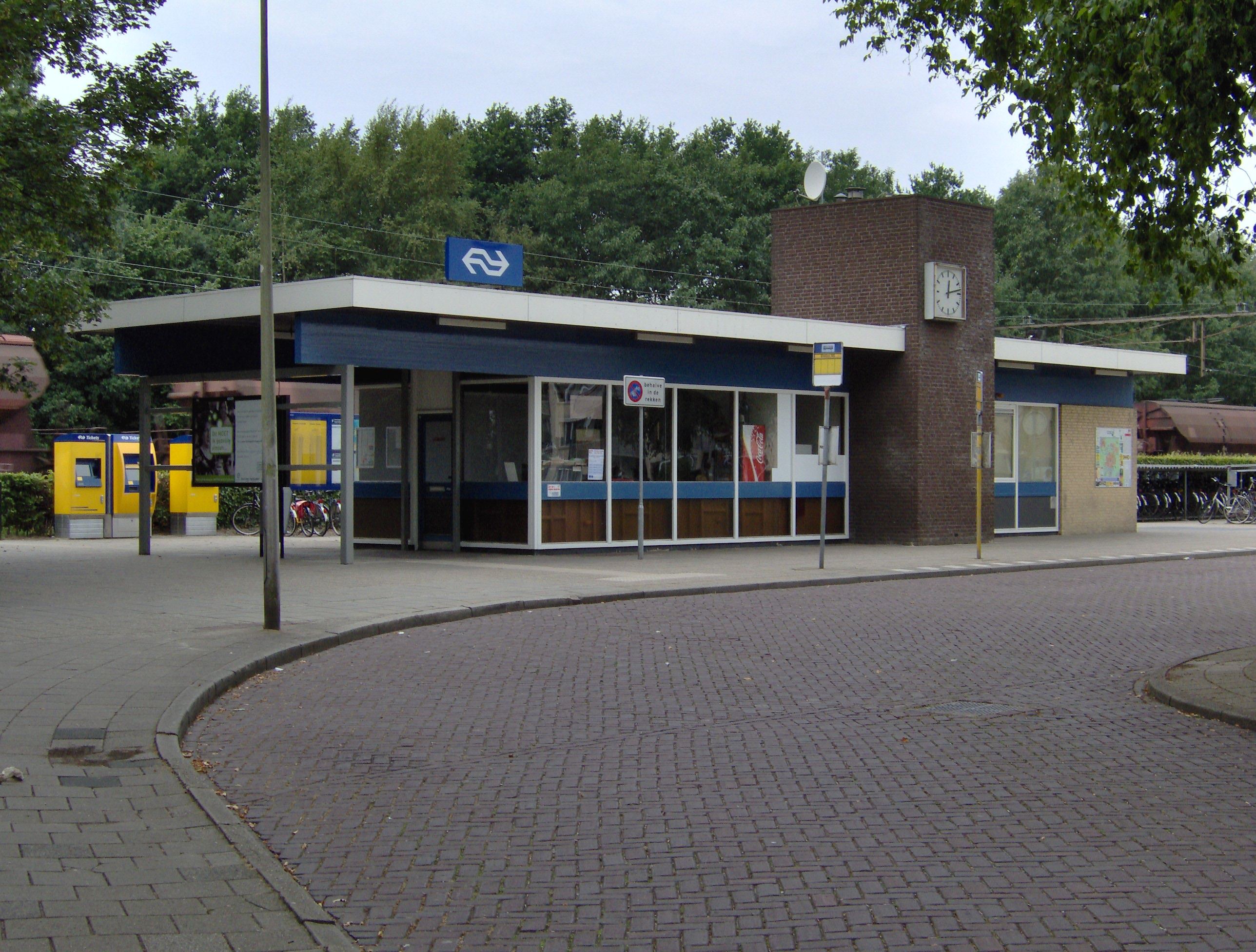

General information
- Location: Netherlands
- Coordinates: 52°17′54″N 6°44′54″E
- Line: Almelo–Salzbergen railway

History
- Opened: 18 October 1865

Services
Preceding station	Nederlandse Spoorwegen	Following station
Almelo de Riet towards Apeldoorn	NS Sprinter 7000	Hengelo towards Enschede
Preceding station	Keolis Nederland	Following station
Almelo de Riet towards Zwolle	Sprinter 7900	Hengelo towards Enschede
Location
- Location within Netherlands

Borne is a railway station located in Borne, Netherlands. The station was opened on 18 October 1865 and is located on the Almelo–Salzbergen railway line.

== Train services ==
Route	Service type	Operator	Notes
Apeldoorn - Deventer - Almelo (- Enschede)	Local ("Sprinter")	NS	Rush hours only.
Zwolle - Almelo - Hengelo - Enschede	Local ("Stoptrein")	Keolis Nederland	2x per hour

== Bus services ==
Line	Route	Operator	Notes
51	Almelo - Zenderen - Borne - Hengelo	Twents	
530	Borne Station → Hengelo Campus West → Hengelo IKEA → Borne Bornsche Maten → Borne Stroom Esch → Borne Station	Twents	Mon-Fri during daytime hours only.
531	Borne Station → Stroom Esch → Molenkamp → Borne Station	Twents	Mon-Fri during daytime hours only.
532	Borne Station → Molenkamp → Letterveld → Borne Station	Twents	Mon-Fri during daytime hours only.
592	Borne - Hertme - Saasveld - Weerselo	Twents	Mon-Fri during daytime hours only.
