= Hengelo Oost railway station =

Railway station in Hengelo, Netherlands

Hengelo Oost
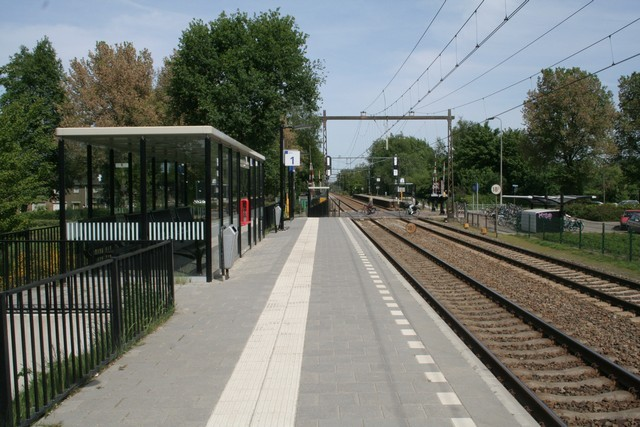

General information
- Location: Netherlands
- Coordinates: 52°16′08″N 6°49′10″E
- Line: Almelo–Salzbergen railway

Other information
- Station code: Hglo

History
- Opened: 1 June 1975

Services
Preceding station	Syntus	Following station
Hengelo towards Zutphen	Stoptrein 31200	Oldenzaal Terminus
Location
- Location within Netherlands

Hengelo Oost is a railway station in Hengelo, The Netherlands. The station opened on 1 June 1975 and is on the Almelo–Salzbergen railway.

== Train services ==
Route	Service type	Operator	Notes
Oldenzaal - Hengelo (- Zutphen)	Local ("Stoptrein")	Arriva	2x per hour

== Bus services ==
As of December 15th 2024, no bus services reach Hengelo Oost.

== Gallery ==
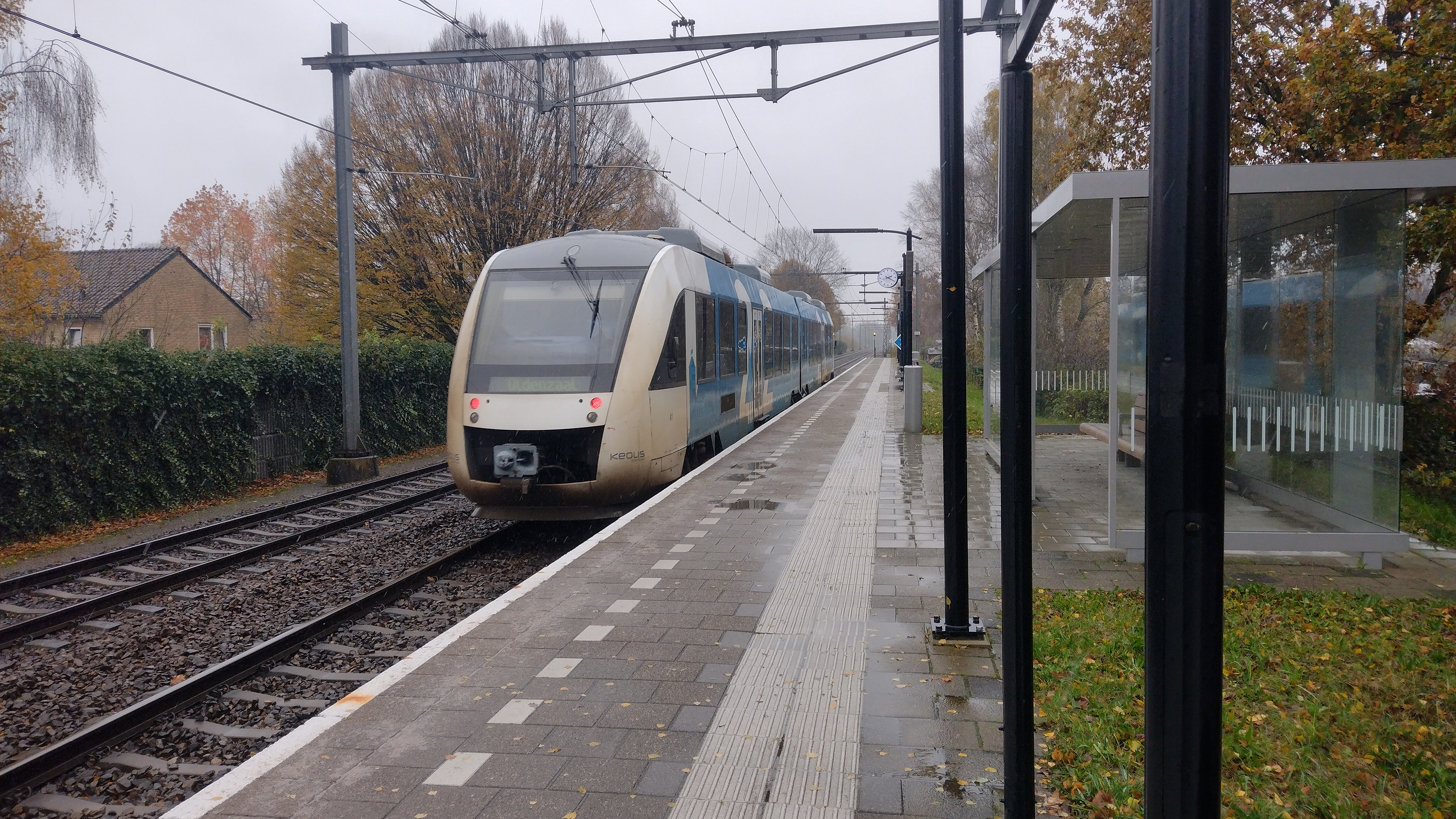
LINT 41 departing to Oldenzaal from platform 2
