= Hengelo Gezondheidspark railway station =

Railway station in the Netherlands

Hengelo Gezondheidspark
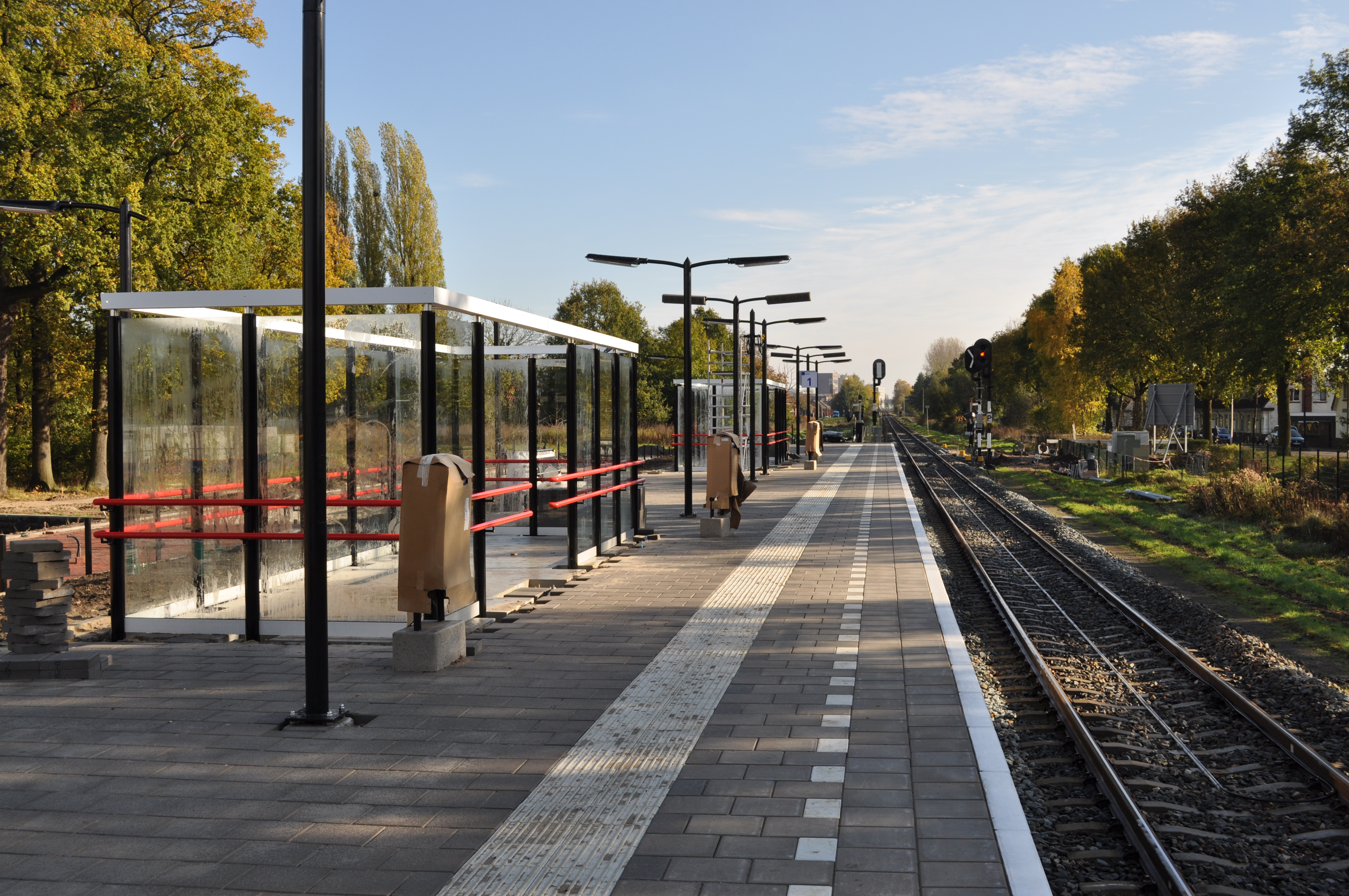

General information
- Location: Netherlands
- Coordinates: 52°15′42″N 6°46′25″E
- Line: Zutphen–Glanerbeek railway

Services
Preceding station	Syntus	Following station
Delden towards Zutphen	Stoptrein 31200	Hengelo towards Oldenzaal
Location
- Location within Netherlands

Hengelo Gezondheidspark (Dutch pronunciation: [ˈɦɛŋəloː ɣəˈzɔntɦɛitsˌpɑr(ə)k]) is a railway station in Hengelo, The Netherlands.

== History ==
The station is located on the Staatslijn D (Zutphen - Glanerbeek) and is located near the Streekziekenhuis Midden-Twente (Hospital) in the west of Hengelo. A station called Tuindorp-Nijverheid, which opened on 1 November 1865 as part of the Staatslijn D and closed in 1936, used to exist in the general area of the new station. The construction of the new station was planned to begin by April 2009, and to be completed by December 2009. The station finally opened on 9 December 2012. The new station has a 130-metre (427 ft) long platform, and a 42-metre (138 ft) long covered area with 20 seats and a ticket machine. The train services are operated by Arriva.

== Train services ==
Route	Service type	Operator	Notes
Oldenzaal - Hengelo (- Zutphen)	Local ("Stoptrein")	Arriva	2x per hour - Late nights and Sundays before 14:00 1x per hour

== Bus services ==
Line	Route	Operator	Notes
14	Centraal Station → Wilderinkshoek → Ziekenhuisgroep Twente (Hospital) → Woolder Es → Centraal Station	RRReis	Late nights and Sunday mornings, this bus only operates between Centraal Station and Ziekenhuis (Hospital).
