= Bad Bentheim station =

Railway station in Bad Bentheim, Germany

Bad Bentheim
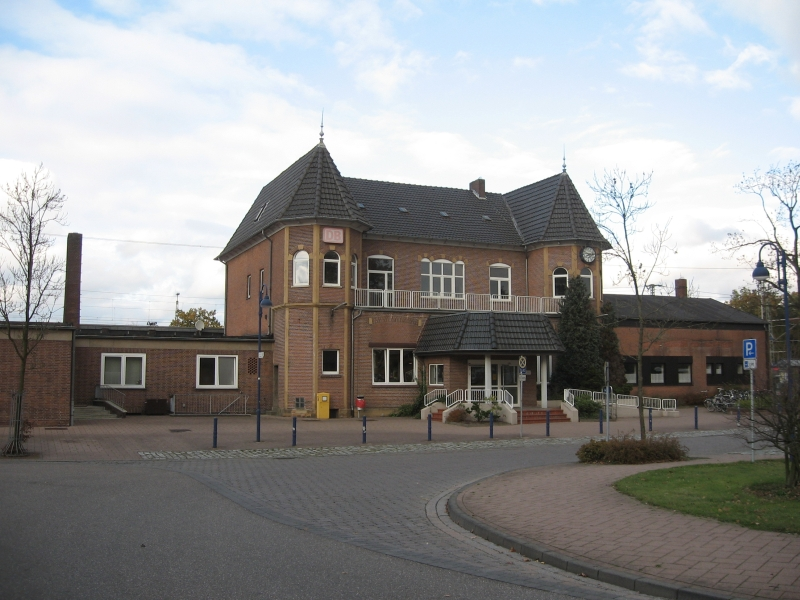
- Bad Bentheim station

General information
- Location: Bad Bentheim, Lower Saxony; Germany
- Coordinates: 52°18′35″N 7°9′26″E
- Owner: Deutsche Bahn
- Operator: DB Station&Service
- Lines: Almelo-Salzbergen railway (KBS 375); Gronau (Westf)–Coevorden railway (KBS 376)
- Platforms: 3

Other information
- Station code: 248
- DS100 code: HBTH
- IBNR: 8000879
- Category: 5
- Fare zone: VGB: 104 (buses only); VGE: Bad Bentheim (VGB transitional tariff, buses only)
- Website: www.bahnhof.de

History
- Opened: 1865

Services
Preceding station	DB Fernverkehr	Following station
Hengelo towards Amsterdam Centraal	ICE 77	Rheine towards Berlin Ostbahnhof
Preceding station		Following station
Terminus	RB 56	Quendorf towards Neuenhaus
Preceding station		Following station
Oldenzaal towards Hengelo	RB 61	Schüttorf towards Bielefeld Hbf
Location
- Location within Lower Saxony Location within Germany Location within Europe

Bad Bentheim is a railway station located in Bad Bentheim, Germany. The station was opened on 18 October 1865 and is located on the Almelo - Salzbergen railway. The train services are operated by Deutsche Bahn with NS International, Bentheimer Eisenbahn and the WestfalenBahn.

The station is a border station between Germany and the Netherlands. Dutch and German locomotives used to change here as the voltage is different in the countries. From December 2023, the intercity services are pulled using a Siemens Vectron locomotive, eliminating the need for a locomotive change. From Bad Bentheim, passengers can travel on the international service to Amsterdam. Passengers can also reach cities such as Osnabrück, Hannover and Berlin.

To the east of the station is a shunting area for the Bentheimer Eisenbahn which is a freight railway to Nordhorn and Coevorden.

== Train services ==
The following services currently call at Bad Bentheim:

- ICE 77: Amsterdam Centraal – Amersfoort – Hengelo – Bad Bentheim – Osnabrück – Hannover – Berlin
- Local services:
  - RB 56: Bad Bentheim – Quendorf – Nordhorn-Blanke – Nordhorn – Neuenhaus Süd – Neuenhaus
  - RB 61: Hengelo – Bad Bentheim – Rheine – Osnabrück – Herford – Bielefeld

From December 2010 until December 2013 there was a trial with a Stoptrain service between Hengelo, Oldenzaal and Bad Bentheim, operated by Syntus as the Grensland-Express. It was cancelled in 2013 due to a lack of passengers. From December 2017, the German RB61 has been extended to Hengelo. Additionally there are plans to extend the RB56 from Neuenhaus to Coevorden.

In March 2026 GoVolta services began calling.

== Bus services ==
- 100 Bad Bentheim - Nordhorn - Neuenhaus - Uelsen - Wilsum - Emlichheim
- 200 Bad Bentheim - Nordhorn - Neuenhaus - Veldhausen - Hoogstede - Emlichheim

== Gallery ==
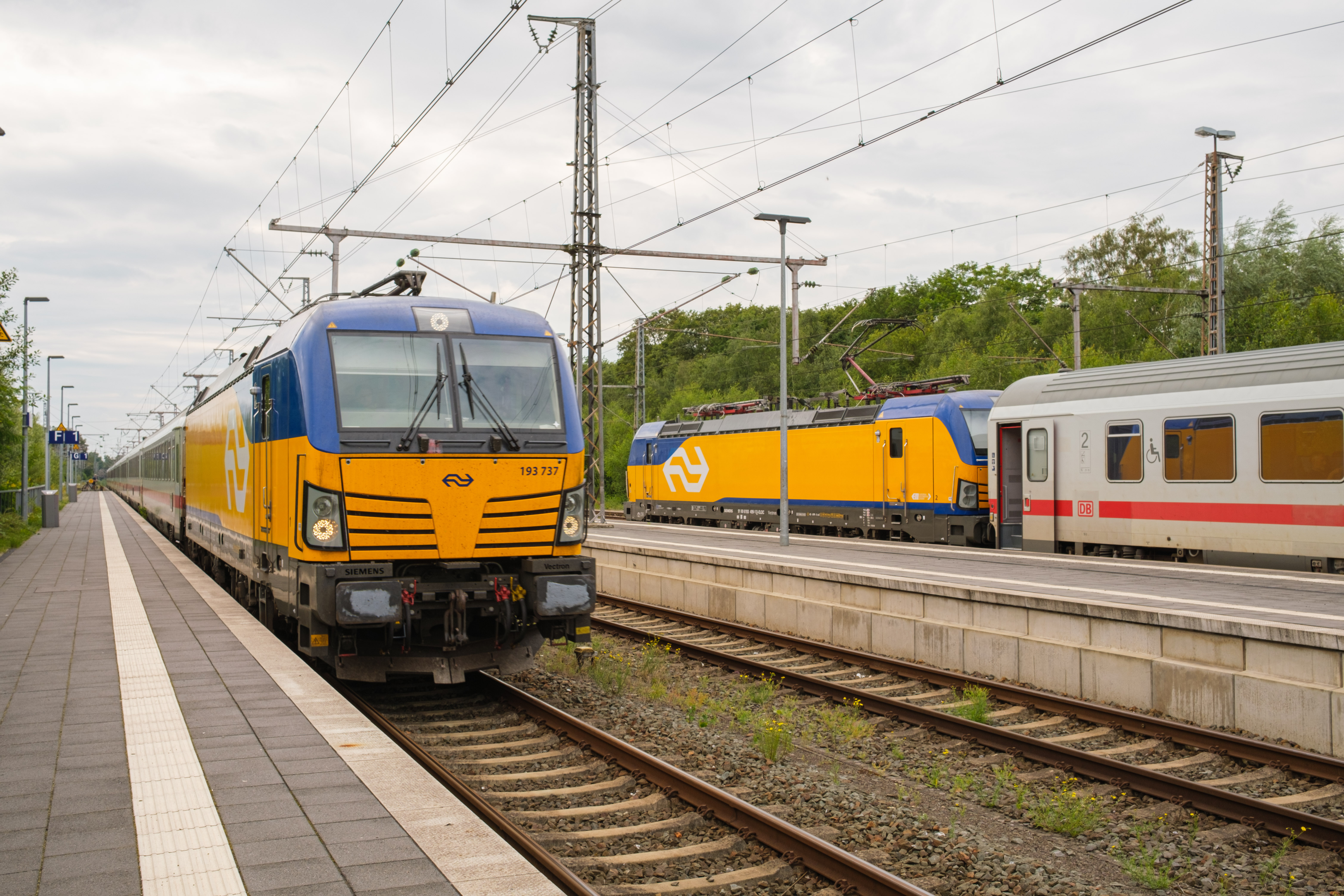
Two Intercities in Bad Bentheim station

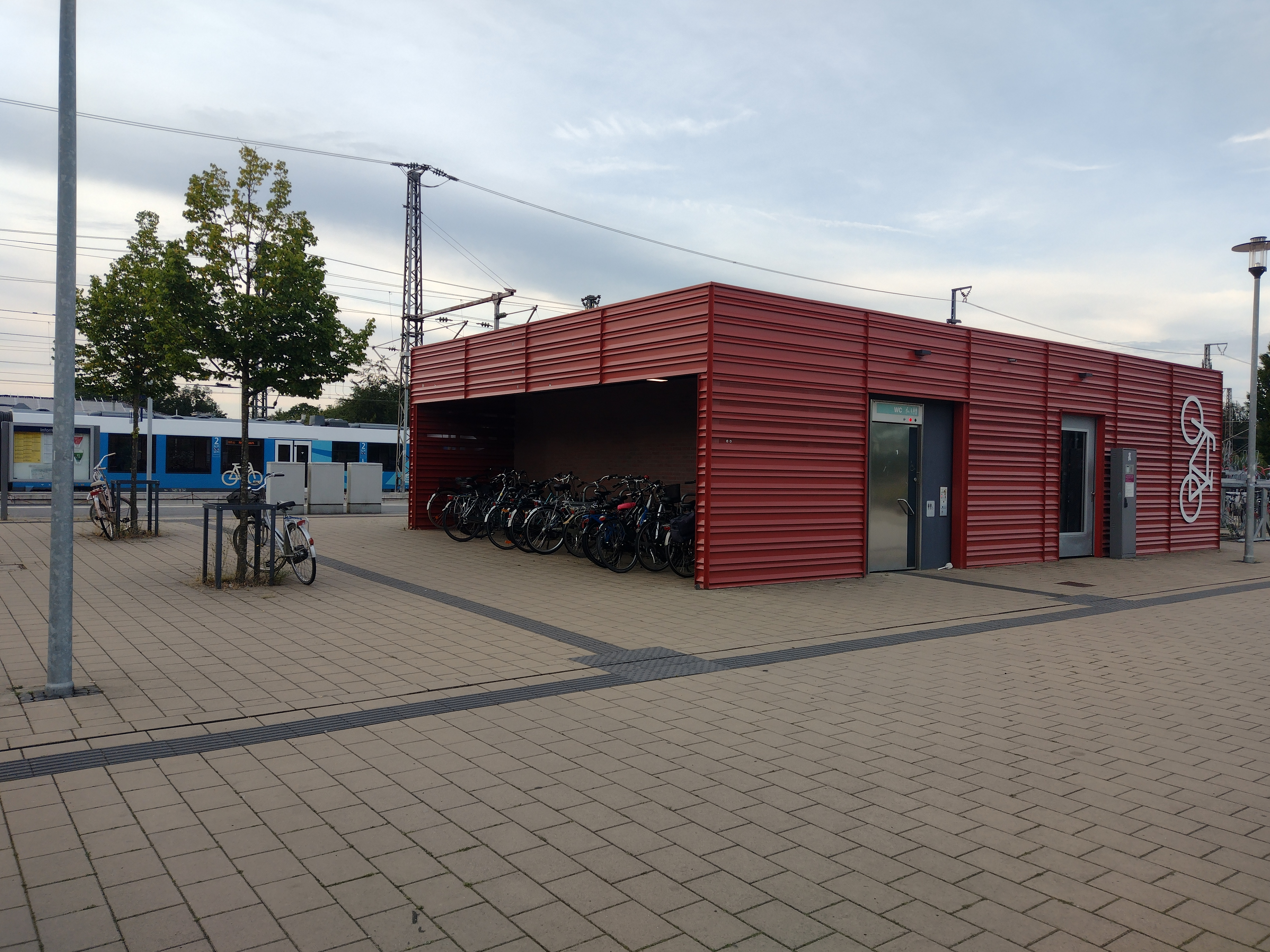
Bicycle parking

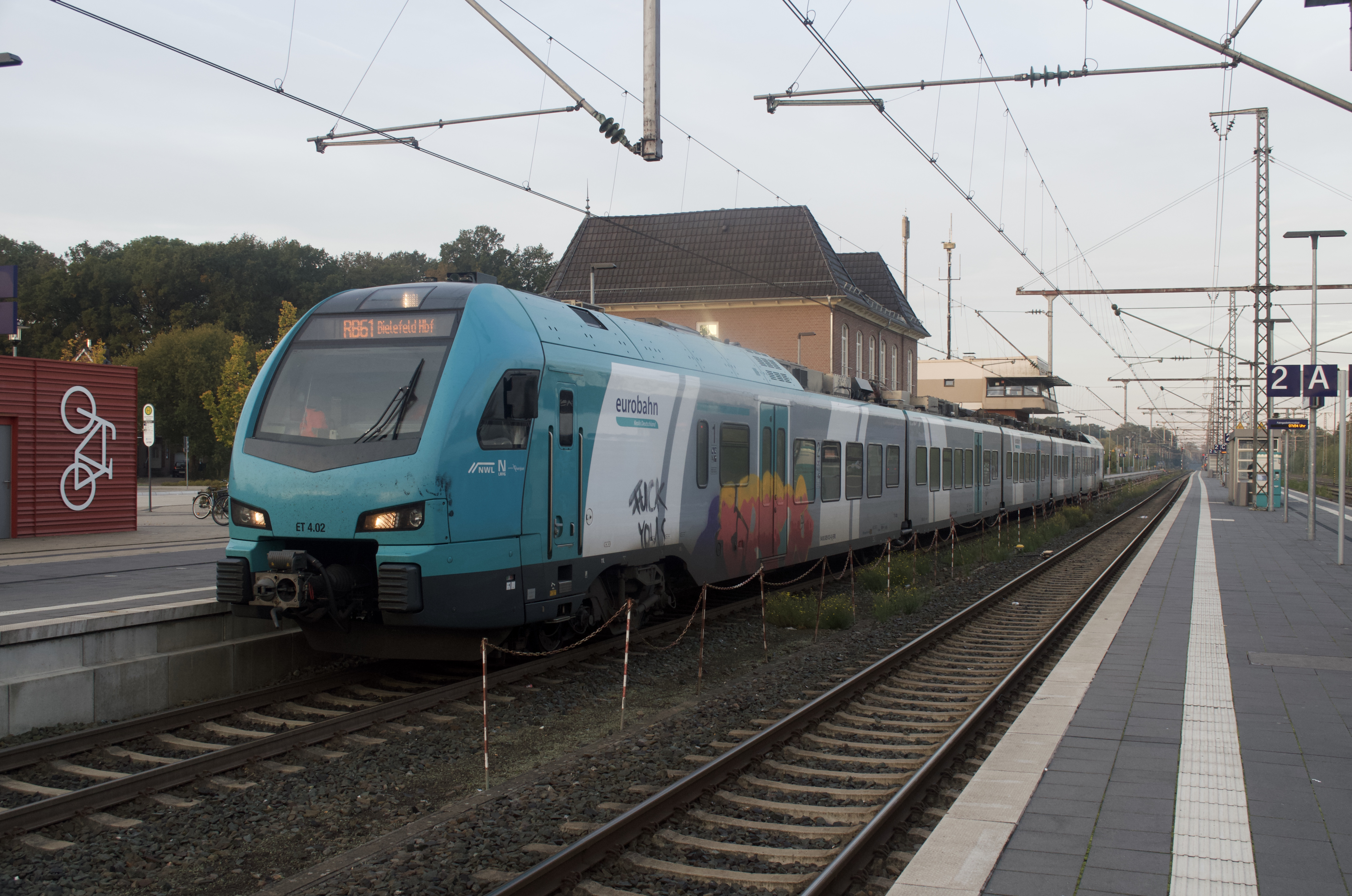
Eurobahn Flirt 3 as RB 61

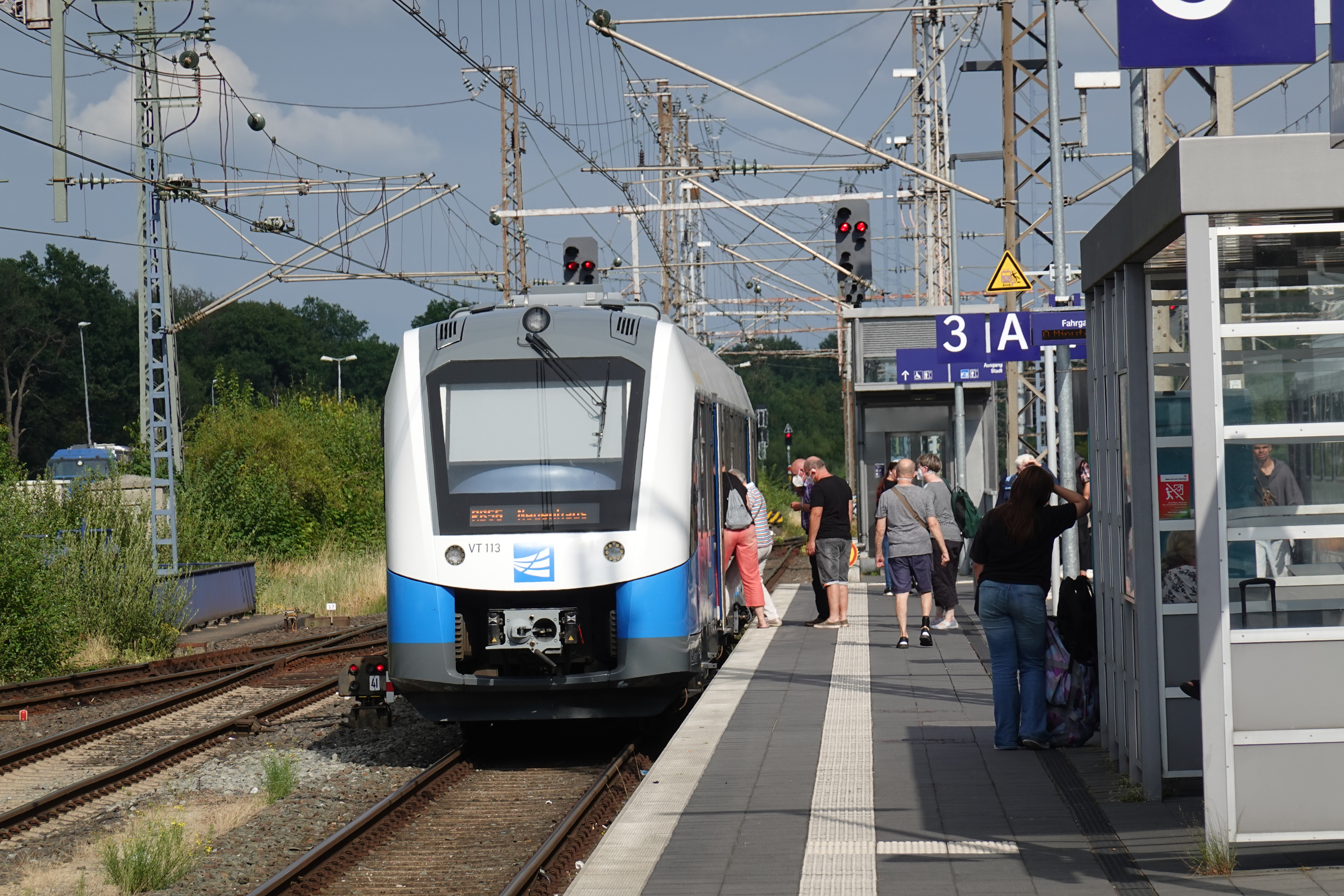
Bentheimer Eisenbahn Lint as RB 56
