= Quendorf station =

Railway station in Quendorf, Germany

Quendorf
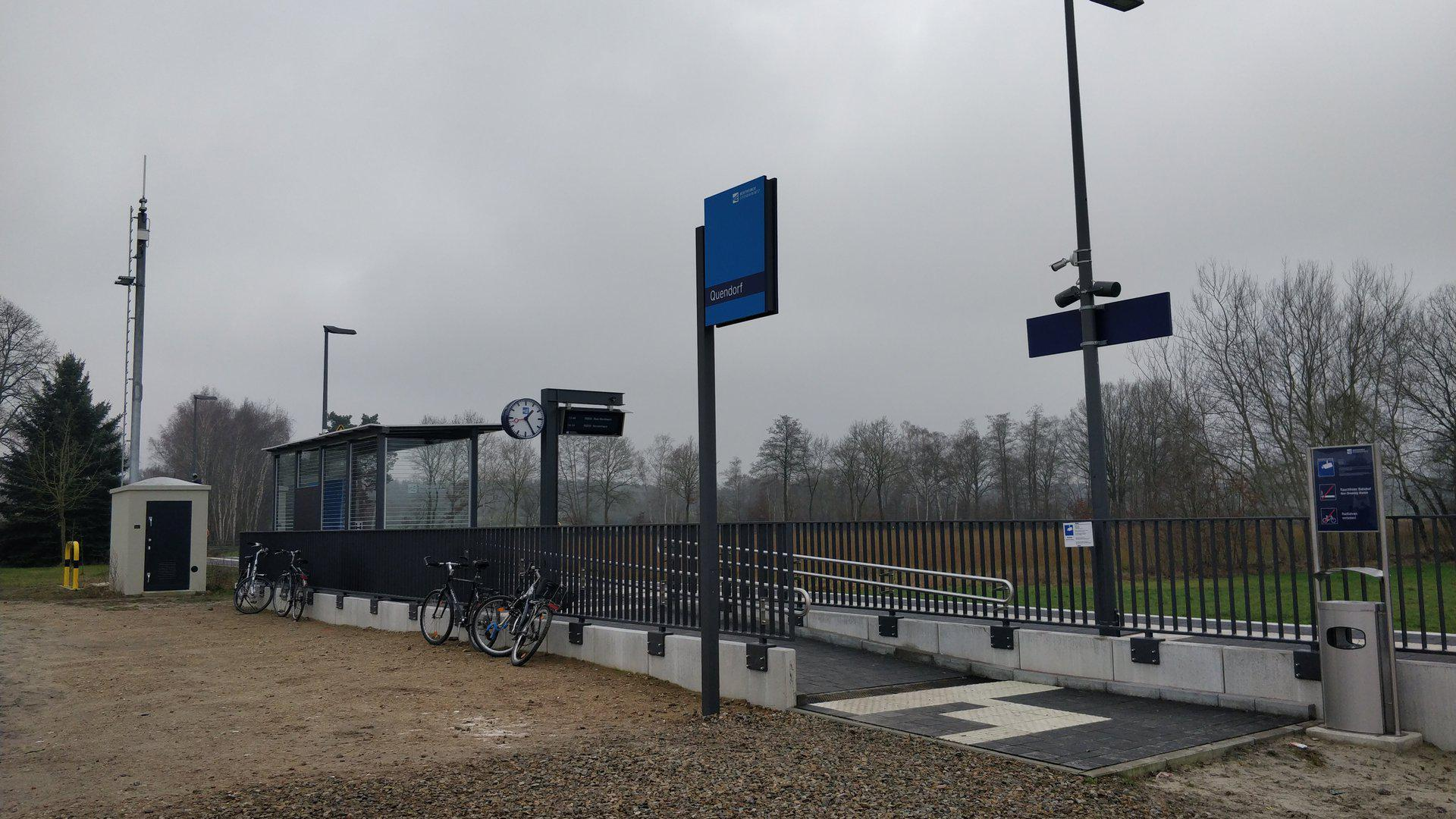

General information
- Location: Alter Postdamm; Quendorf, Lower Saxony; Germany
- Coordinates: 52°20′19″N 7°10′19″E
- System: Hp
- Owner: Bentheimer Eisenbahn
- Operator: Bentheimer Eisenbahn
- Lines: Gronau (Westf)–Coevorden railway (KBS 376)
- Platforms: 1
- Tracks: 1

History
- Opened: 1865

Services
Preceding station		Following station
Bad Bentheim Terminus	RB 56	Nordhorn-Blanke towards Neuenhaus
Location
- Location within Lower Saxony Location within Germany Location within Europe

Quendorf is a railway station located in Quendorf, Lower Saxony, Germany. The station features a newly built halt, which opened in 2019. It serves the Regionalbahn line 56 (Bad Bentheim – Neuenhaus), with trains stopping at the station every hour. The halt is situated in close proximity to the former station building, which has been privately restored and retains historical elements such as a station clock, a kilometer stone, and benches from the old platform.

== History ==
The Quendorf station on the Gronau–Coevorden railway line resumed passenger rail service on July 7, 2019, after a 45-year hiatus, as part of the reactivation of regional rail services (SPNV) by Bentheimer Eisenbahn (BE). This reactivation is integrated into Lower Saxony's extensive efforts to enhance public transport connectivity, particularly in rural areas far from major urban centers. This reactivation includes the establishment of new stops such as Neuenhaus, Nordhorn, and Nordhorn Süd, aimed at better integrating these areas with the regional public transport network.

Trains on this route now operate from 5:30 AM to 10:30 PM, offering hourly services that connect seamlessly with the RB 61 Eurobahn line at Bad Bentheim, enhancing regional mobility. The local bus network in Grafschaft Bentheim has also been restructured to complement the reinstated train services effectively.

== Services ==
The following train services call at this station:

Line	Route	Frequency
RB 56	Neuenhaus – Nordhorn – Quendorf – Bad Bentheim	one train Eisenach-Binz Fr-Sa
