= Oldenzaal railway station =

Railway station in the Netherlands

Oldenzaal
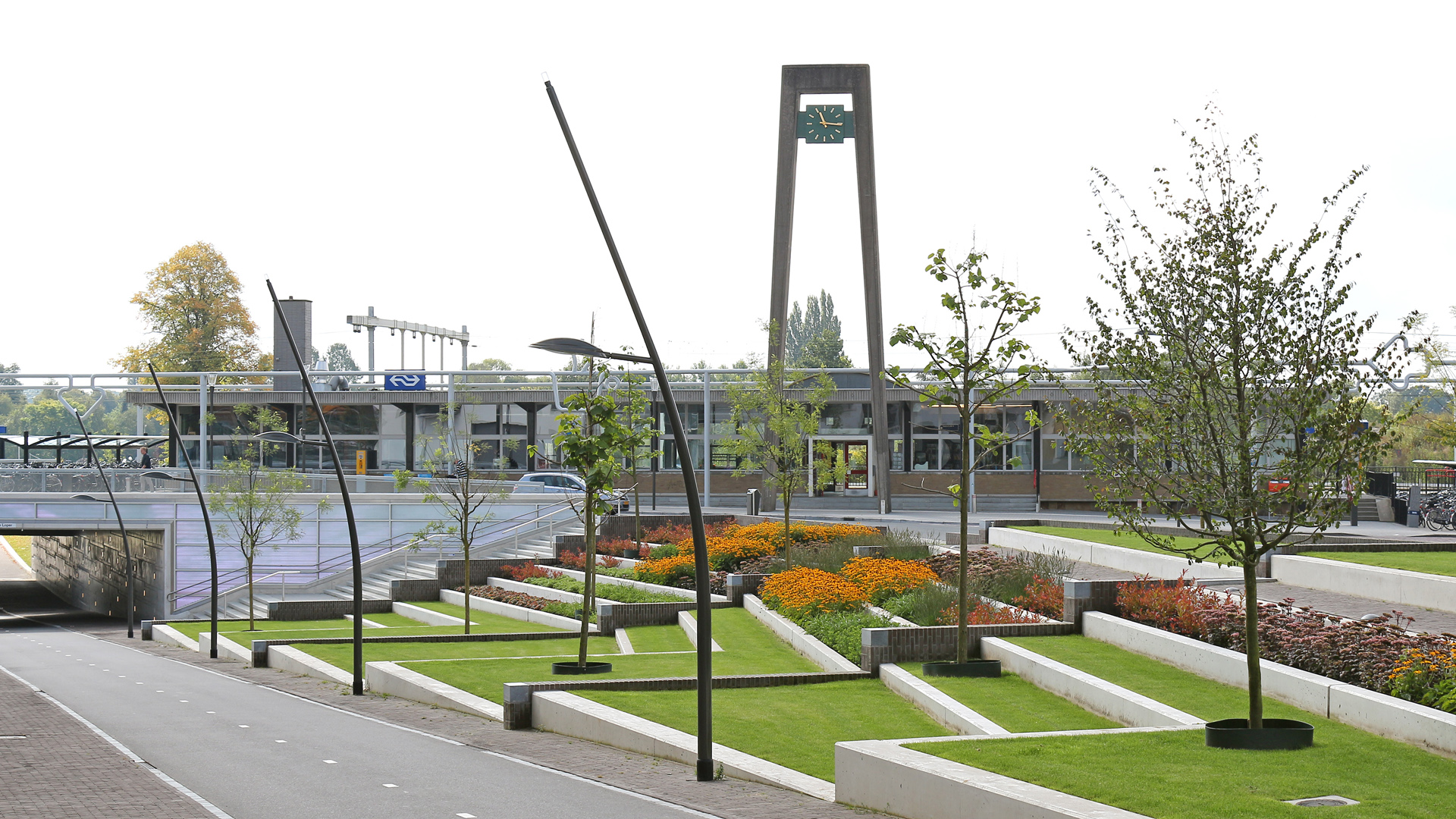

General information
- Location: Oldenzaal, Netherlands
- Coordinates: 52°18′22″N 6°56′01″E
- Line: Almelo–Salzbergen railway

History
- Opened: 18 October 1865

Services
Preceding station	Syntus	Following station
Hengelo Oost towards Zutphen	Stoptrein 31200	Terminus
Preceding station		Following station
Hengelo Terminus	RB 61	Bad Bentheim towards Bielefeld Hbf
Location
- Location within Netherlands

Oldenzaal is a railway station located in the centre of Oldenzaal, Netherlands. The station was opened on 18 October 1865 and is located on the Almelo–Salzbergen railway. Train services are operated by Syntus. From December 2010-December 2013, Syntus operated a cross-border local train between Hengelo, Oldenzaal and Bad Bentheim with the name "Grensland Express". Service was suspended due to a lack of passengers. On 14 January 2018, this route was reinstated when Eurobahn extended its service from Bad Bentheim to Hengelo.

There was another station, close to the main Oldenzaal station, called Oldenzaal EO for train services to Boekelo (1890-1934). There was also a tram line to Denekamp (1903-1936).

== Train services ==
Route	Service type	Operator	Notes
Oldenzaal - Hengelo (- Zutphen)	Local ("Stoptrein")	Syntus	2x per hour
Hengelo - Bad Bentheim (Germany) - Osnabrück Hbf (Germany) - Bünde (Germany) - Bielefeld Hbf (Germany)	RegionalBahn	Eurobahn	1x per hour - does not stop at Hengelo Oost.

== Bus services ==
Line	Route	Operator	Notes
60	Enschede - Lonneker - Oldenzaal Station - Oldenzaal De Thij	Twents	Mon-Fri during daytime hours only. During vacations, service is limited to two rush hour (morning and afternoon) runs in both directions only.
62	Borculo - Neede - Rietmolen - Brammelo - Haaksbergen - Usselo - Enschede - Lonneker - Oldenzaal - Beuningen - Denekamp	Twents	
64	Almelo - Harbrinkhoek - Geesteren - Tubbergen - Vasse - Ootmarsum - Rossum - Oldenzaal - Losser - Overdinkel	Twents	Does not run after 22:00. On Sundays, this bus only operates between Almelo and Oldenzaal.
65	Station - Centrum (town centre) - Graven Es - De Thij	Twents	No service on Sundays.
66	(Neede - Markvelde - Hengevelde - Bentelo -) Delden - Bornerbroek - Almelo - Albergen - Fleringen - Weerselo - Lemselo - Oldenzaal	Twents	Outside of rush hours, this bus only operates between Delden and Oldenzaal. No service on Sundays.
593	Oldenzaal - De Lutte	Twents	No service after 20:00 and on Sundays.
