= Enschede Kennispark railway station =

Railway station in the Netherlands

Enschede Kennispark
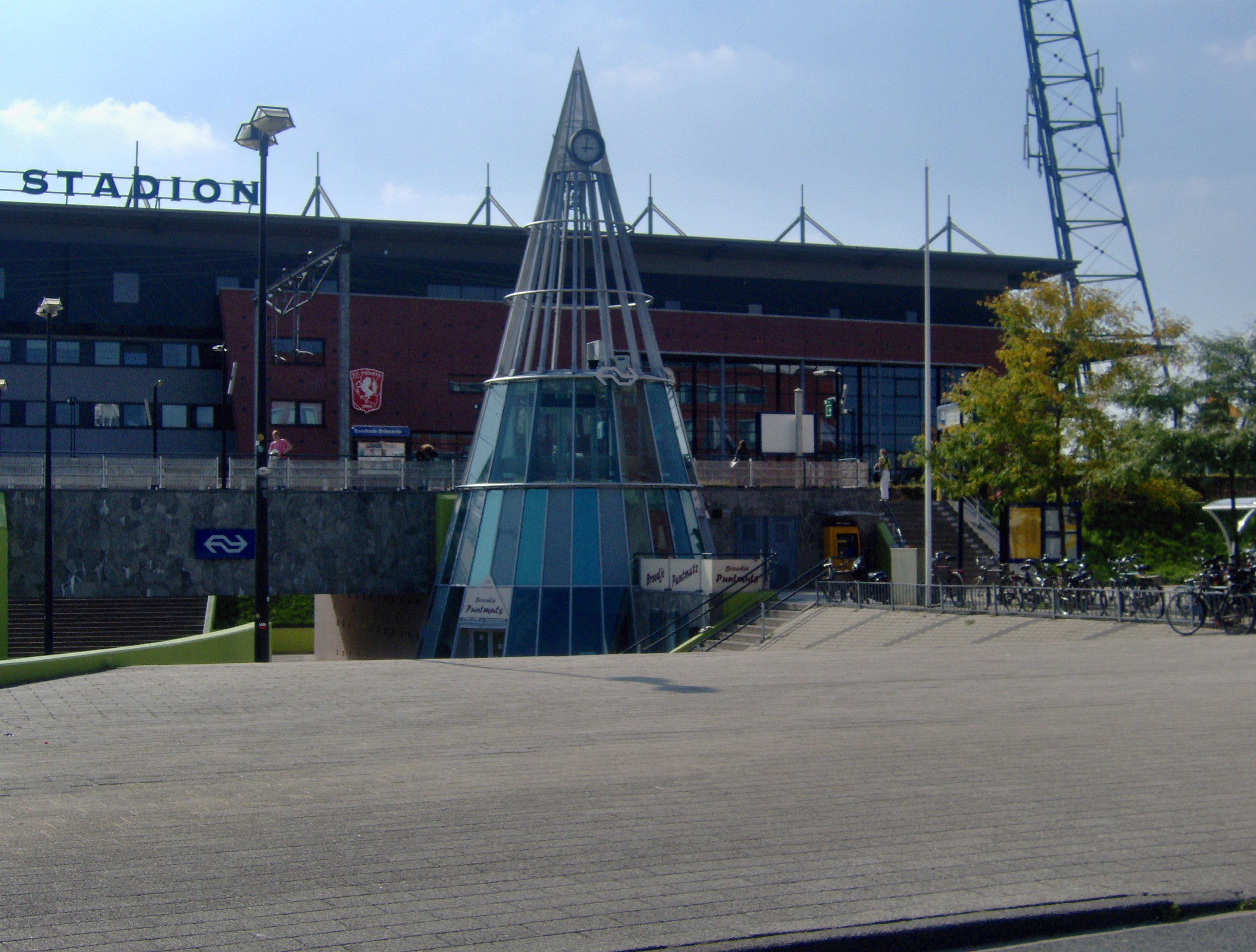

General information
- Location: Netherlands
- Coordinates: 52°14′15″N 6°50′19″E
- Line: Zutphen–Glanerbeek railway
- Platforms: 2

History
- Opened: 22 November 1996

Services
Preceding station	Nederlandse Spoorwegen	Following station
Hengelo towards Apeldoorn	NS Sprinter 7000	Enschede Terminus
Preceding station	Keolis Nederland	Following station
Hengelo towards Zwolle	Sprinter 7900	Enschede Terminus
Location
- Location within Netherlands

Enschede Kennispark is a railway station in Enschede, Netherlands. The station was opened on 22 November 1996 and is located on the Zutphen–Glanerbeek railway. The train services are operated by Nederlandse Spoorwegen.

The station is directly next to the home stadium of FC Twente, de Grolsch Veste. The station is also used by university students, as it lies close to the campus of University of Twente.

The station was originally called Enschede Drienerlo, named after the former Drienerlo estate, until it was renamed Enschede Kennispark on 13 December 2015. This is to reflect the redevelopment of the area around the station into a science park.

== Train services ==
Route	Service type	Operator	Notes
Apeldoorn - Deventer - Almelo (- Enschede)	Local ("Sprinter")	NS	Rush hours only.
Zwolle - Almelo - Hengelo - Enschede	Local ("Stoptrein")	Keolis Nederland	2x per hour

== Bus services ==
Line	Route	Operator	Notes
1	Wesselerbrink - Boswinkel - Centrum (Downtown) - Centraal Station - Twekkelerveld - Kennispark - Universiteit Twente (Twente University)	Twents	
