= Hengelo =

Hengelo Hengel (Twents)
- Municipality
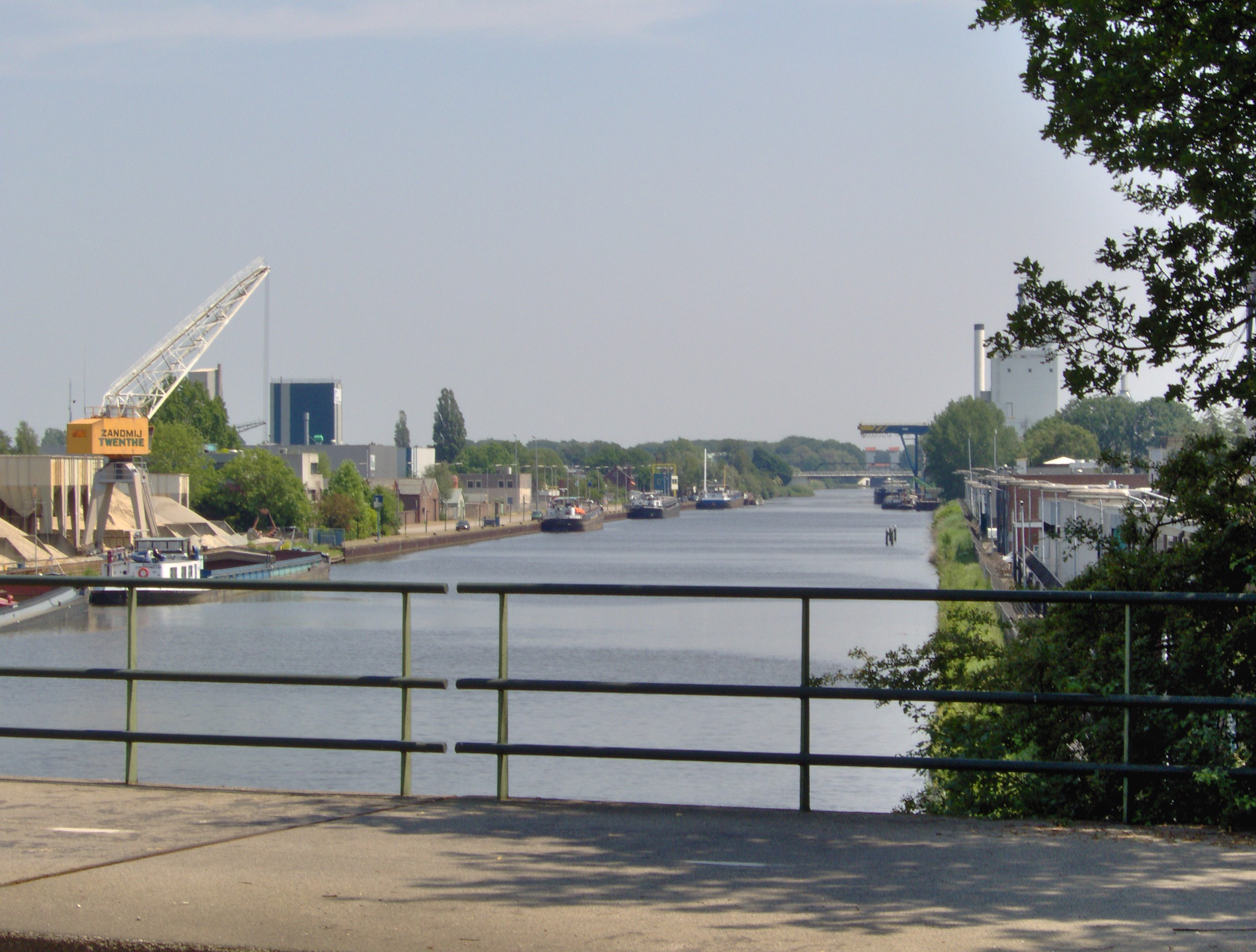
- Twentekanaal through Hengelo

- Flag Coat of arms

- Location in Overijssel

- Location within the Netherlands Location within Europe
- Coordinates: 52°15′55″N 6°47′35″E
- Country: Netherlands
- Province: Overijssel

Government
  - Body: Municipal council
  - Mayor: Sander Schelberg (VVD)

Area
  - Total: 61.83 km^{2} (23.87 sq mi)
  - Land: 60.84 km^{2} (23.49 sq mi)
  - Water: 0.99 km^{2} (0.38 sq mi)
- Elevation: 18 m (59 ft)

Population (2023)
  - Total: 82,311
  - Density: 1,332/km^{2} (3,450/sq mi)
- Demonym: Hengolian
- Time zone: UTC+1 (CET)
  - Summer (DST): UTC+2 (CEST)
- Postcode: 7550–7559
- Area code: 074
- Climate: Cfb
- Website: www.hengelo.nl

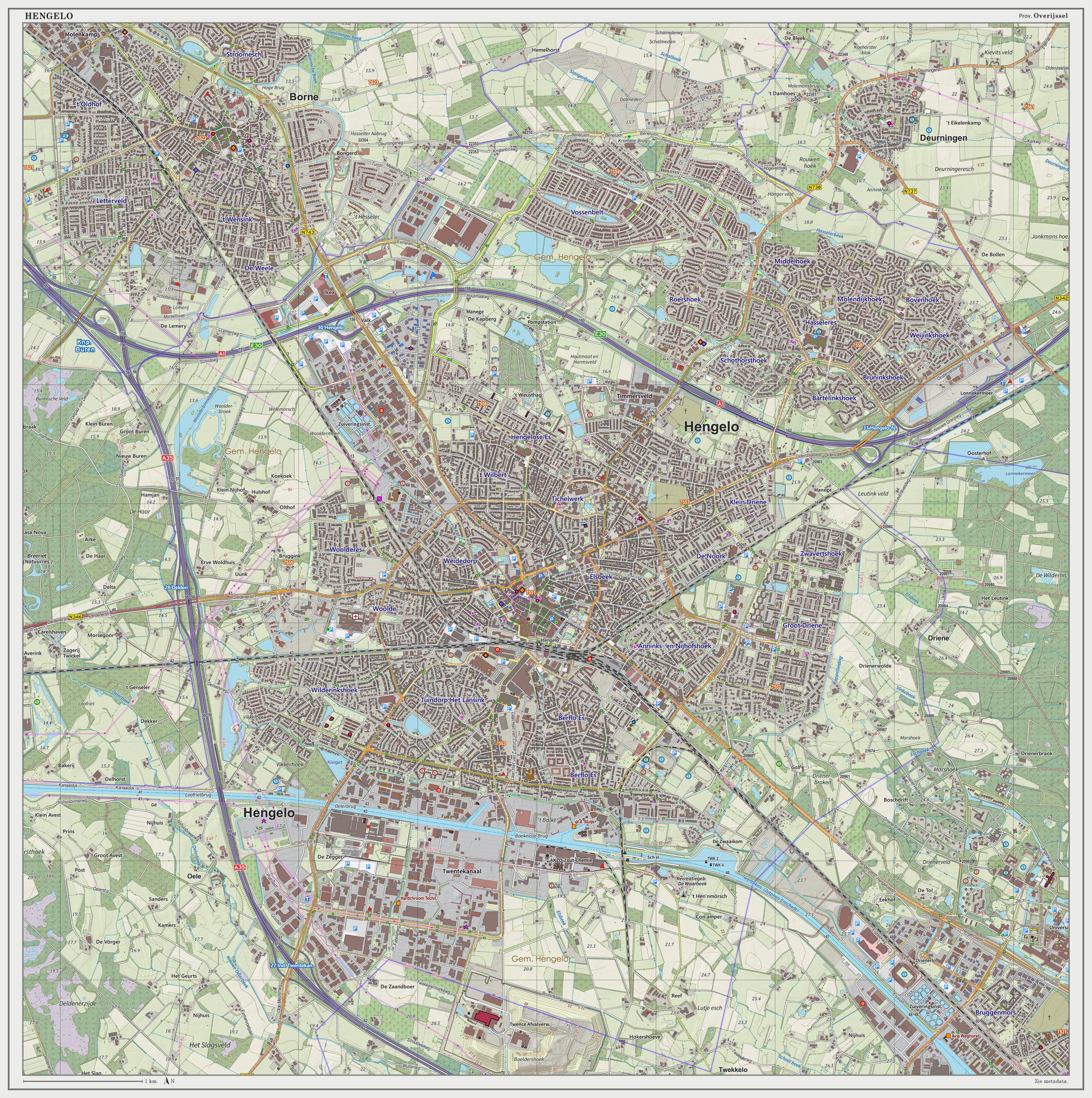
Map of Hengelo (city), June 2014

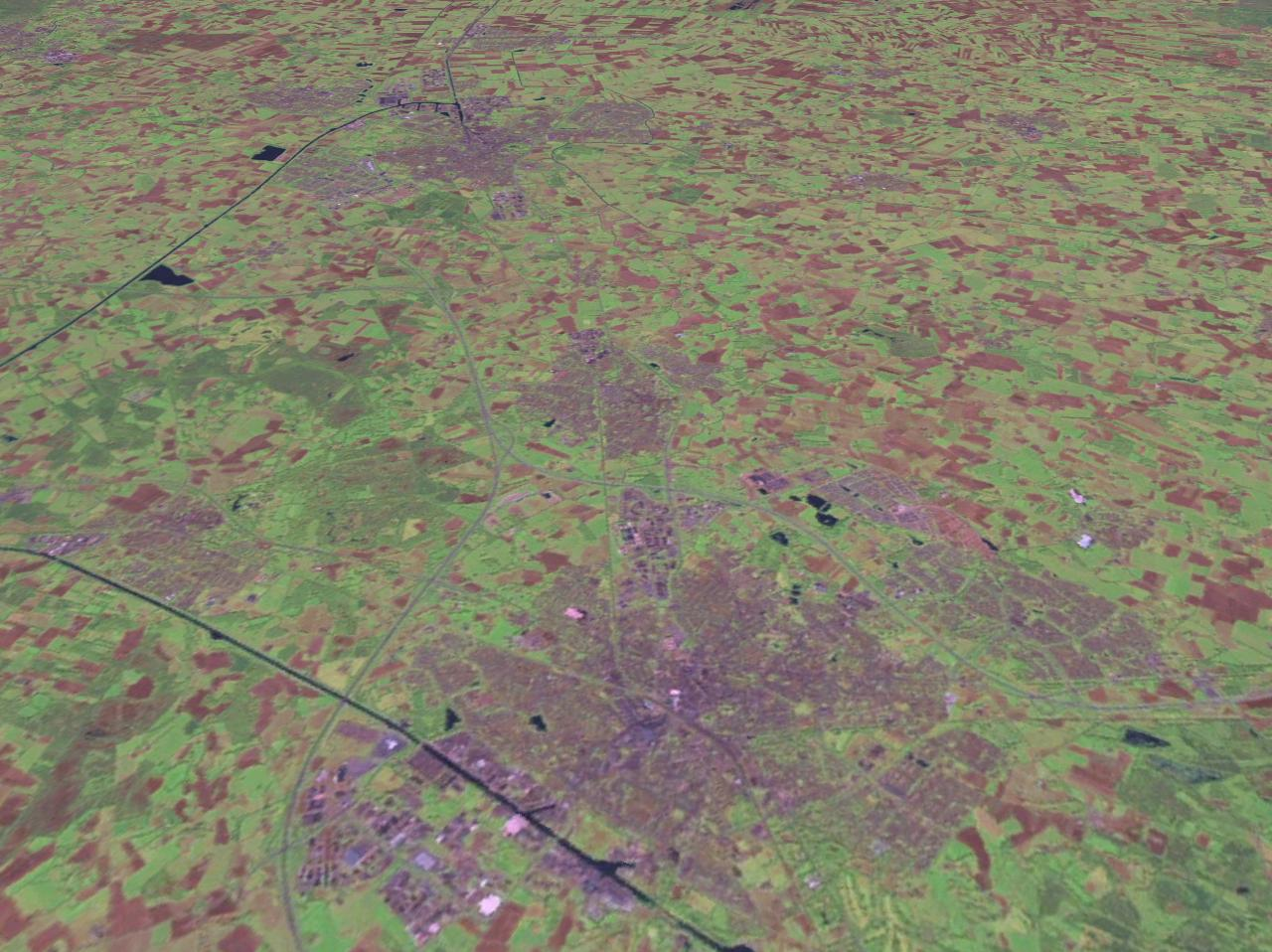
Two of the three large cities in East Overijssel: Almelo and Hengelo

Hengelo (Dutch: [ˈɦɛŋəloː]; Tweants: Hengel) is a city in the eastern part of the Netherlands, in the Twente region, in the province of Overijssel. It is part of a larger urban area that also includes Enschede, Borne, Almelo and Oldenzaal.

Due to its geomorphology, being situated relatively low in the landscape, Hengelo is a place where streams converge. By consequence, it became a crossroad, inhabited early on in history, which has made it into an infrastructural hub and an industrial centre today. For the 19th century industry, water was needed for bleaching textile, while factories also needed water for their steam engines, and for cooling. Over time, Hengelo became known as metaalstad, for its machine factories and electrical engineering companies. In addition, salt mining developed into an important industry too, which also led to the production of chemical derivatives.

Due to its strategical importance, Hengelo was bombed during World War II. Afterwards, a reconstruction plan was developed that made it into a modern city, partly at the cost of still remaining historical structures. Well-known Dutch planners and architects have left their traces inside and outside the city. Among their most notable efforts are several residential areas, being inspired by the principles of the garden city movement. Due to the vicinity of University of Twente and ArtEZ University of Arts, in Enschede, many students and graduates have come to live and work in Hengelo. Besides economic growth, this has also contributed to the city's development in regard to arts and culture.

== Population centres ==
- Beckum
- Hengelo
- Oele

== History ==
In what is known as the historical centre of Hengelo, archaeologists have found a camp site for hunters and gatherers, indicating that the location was inhabited during the Mesolithic, between 12,000 and 5,000 years BP. The area has most likely been continuously inhabited ever since. On the same site, finds from the Iron Age and Roman times have also been excavated. Different settlements, moreover, existed within the current municipality. Recent archaeological research in the north of Hengelo has led to the discovery of a prehistoric grave field, as well as another settlement from Roman times, with pottery and other artefacts corresponding to the Weser–Rhine Germanic tradition.

In the mid 13th century, an estate was built, called Huys Hengelo, which existed till 1826, when it was demolished. A village grew around the estate, including a church and a cemetery. During the Spanish occupation of the Netherlands, Huys Hengelo was the centre of several fights and revolts.

The municipality of Hengelo was founded in 1802, which by then consisted of a few hundred farms and agricultural workers' houses.

Hengelo was never granted city rights, as it was a village until its expansion in the 19th century during the industrial revolution. In that period, however, various landmark buildings were erected, especially the Waterstaatskerk (1839), and the Lambertusbasiliek (1890), a Roman Catholic basilica built in 1890 devoted to Saint Lambert.

After the construction of its railway station in 1866, industrial development accelerated, with a focus on technology: Stork B.V., Hazemeyer, N.V. Heemaf (now part of France's Alstom, Brush HMA, Brush-Barclay, Eaton Corporation, Essent, Heemaf BV, Vattenfall, and Wabtec), KHZ (now AkzoNobel), and Hollandse Signaal Apparaten (now part of the Thales Group). Especially Stork played an important role in the development of Hengelo, building garden village Tuindorp 't Lansink (1910s), with housing for its personnel, while also contributing to building public facilities in the city centre, such as a library.

Hengelo was also the home town of Hengelo Bier, a local brewery. Nowadays, the beer brand Twents is produced in Hengelo, brewed by De Twentse Bierbrouwerij. This brewery was founded in 2007 and was, until 2019, located in the monumental factory complex Hazemeijer.

During World War II, the city was bombed by the Allies because of the presence of the railways and the war industry activities of local factories that served the occupier. The heart of the town was accidentally destroyed during the bombing of Hengelo on 6 and 7 October 1944, killing several hundred people.

In addition, after World War II, the synagogue that had survived the war, an entire block called De Telgen, a monastery at the Thiemsbrug, the farm dating from the 17th century where Wolter ten Cate was born, and the 19th-century town hall, were all demolished. This has also left the city without much of an historical centre. However, the reconstruction plan of Hengelo, including its town hall (1958–1963, J. F. Berghoef), received critical acclaim and is now considered an important example of post-war city planning in the Netherlands. By extension, Hengelo also became a reference for modern architecture, with innovative housing designs, such as Klein Driene I & II (1945–1965, C. Pouderoyen & W.R. van Couwelaar), Housing Hengelose Es (1962–1968, Van den Broek & Bakema), and De Kasbah (1969–1973, Piet Blom).

== Transport ==
Hengelo is a major transportation hub in the region, which includes various modes.

=== Car ===
- Hengelo sits along the motorway A1 (from Amsterdam to the Dutch-German border), and the E30 (from Cork, Ireland, to Omsk, Russia).
- The A35/N35 motorway from the German border begins as a two-lane expressway leading to the southern side of Enschede, then transitions into a highway that runs along the city's western side until Wierden, after that, it reverts to a two-lane expressway and continues as a standard two-lane road towards Zwolle.

=== Train ===
- Hengelo Railway Station is part of the Amsterdam – Berlin train service. There are international trains daily to Bad Bentheim, Rheine, Osnabrück, Hannover, and Berlin.
- From Hengelo there are direct services to cities across the Netherlands, among them Almelo, Amersfoort, Amsterdam, Amsterdam Airport Schiphol, Amsterdam-Zuid, Apeldoorn, Deventer, Enschede, Gouda, Hilversum, Oldenzaal, Rotterdam, The Hague, Utrecht, Zutphen, Zwolle. For travel information, visit Hengelo railway station or the website of Dutch Railways.
- Besides the main station, there are two local train stations, Hengelo Oost, giving access to a residential district and leisure facilities, and Hengelo Gezondheidspark, giving access to the city's main health care complex (including a hospital).

=== Bus ===
- Within the city, one can travel by train and bus, which are services provided by Arriva. Within the urban transport network are several bus lanes, specifically built for buses to travel faster.

=== Bike ===
- Within and outside the city, there is an extensive network of cyclepaths. Part of it is the so-called Bicyle Highway F35 (Fietssnelweg F35), connecting Nijverdal, Wierden, Almelo, Borne, Hengelo and Enschede.

=== Boat ===
- The Twentekanaal (canal) connects the Twente region with the river IJssel. The canal is mainly used for cargo transportation, as Hengelo has a relatively large harbour with various industries.

== Climate ==
Like most of the Netherlands, Hengelo features an oceanic climate (Cfb in the Köppen classification); however, winters tend to be less mild than the rest of the Netherlands due to its inland location. Summer is also warmer than places near the coast. Although the former military airport is derelict and plans to revive the place were canceled in 2012, the weather station of the Royal Netherlands Meteorological Institute is still located there.

Climate data for Twenthe (1981-2010)
Month	Jan	Feb	Mar	Apr	May	Jun	Jul	Aug	Sep	Oct	Nov	Dec	Year
Mean daily maximum °C (°F)	4.8 (40.6)	5.7 (42.3)	9.5 (49.1)	13.9 (57.0)	18.0 (64.4)	20.5 (68.9)	22.8 (73.0)	22.5 (72.5)	18.7 (65.7)	14.1 (57.4)	8.9 (48.0)	5.2 (41.4)	13.7 (56.7)
Daily mean °C (°F)	2.3 (36.1)	2.6 (36.7)	5.6 (42.1)	8.9 (48.0)	12.9 (55.2)	15.4 (59.7)	17.6 (63.7)	17.1 (62.8)	14.0 (57.2)	10.2 (50.4)	6.0 (42.8)	2.9 (37.2)	9.6 (49.3)
Mean daily minimum °C (°F)	−0.5 (31.1)	−0.6 (30.9)	1.5 (34.7)	3.4 (38.1)	7.1 (44.8)	9.6 (49.3)	12.0 (53.6)	11.5 (52.7)	9.2 (48.6)	6.2 (43.2)	3.0 (37.4)	0.3 (32.5)	5.2 (41.4)
Average precipitation mm (inches)	71.5 (2.81)	51.6 (2.03)	65.1 (2.56)	45.2 (1.78)	62.4 (2.46)	67.7 (2.67)	74.5 (2.93)	71.0 (2.80)	65.4 (2.57)	67.5 (2.66)	68.9 (2.71)	74.1 (2.92)	784.9 (30.90)
Mean monthly sunshine hours	52.8	82.6	114.0	169.9	202.1	184.6	202.4	184.4	137.4	112.3	58.9	46.0	1,547.3
Source: KNMI

== Notable events ==
- On February 11, 1992, a Dutch F-16 crashed into the district Hasseler Es.
- The Canadian rock band The Tragically Hip mention Hengelo in their song "At the Hundredth Meridian", where they "remember Hengelo" after a glorious gig in Metropool (concert hall in Hengelo).
- The British indie rock band Spring Offensive on their first studio album "Young Animal Hearts" mention Hengelo in their song "Hengelo".

== Twin towns – sister cities ==
Hengelo is twinned with:

- Emsdetten, Germany

== Education ==
Hengelo has seven high schools. These high schools are the Montessori College Twente, Bataafs Lyceum, Twickel College, Avila College, C.T. Stork College, Grundel Lyceum and 't Genseler.

There is also an MBO school, ROC of Twente.

The Tio Business School (HBO, University of Applied Sciences) is also located in Hengelo.

There is also Twents Vakcollege 't Woolde which is a worker-oriented school located.

== Notable residents ==
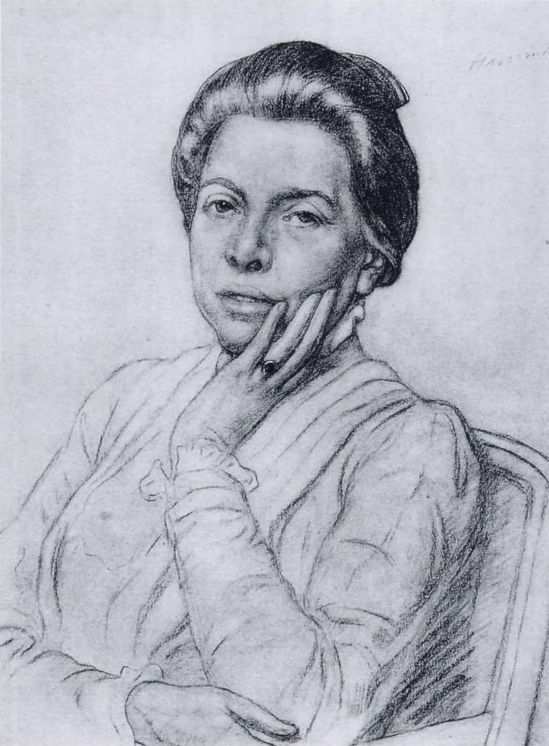
Portrait of Grada Hermina Marius, 1919

- Grada Hermina Marius (1854–1919), writer and painter
- Hendrik Meijer (1883–1964), Dutch-American businessman and founder of Meijer retail chain
- Donald Zilversmit (1919–2010), U.S. nutritional biochemist, researcher and educator
- Herman Krebbers (1923–2018), violinist
- Theo Wolvecamp (1925–1992), avant-garde painter, member of Cobra
- Ernst van de Wetering (1938–2021), Dutch art historian and expert on Rembrandt
- Jacqueline de Jong (1939–2024), painter, sculptor and graphic artist
- Ad Kolnaar (born 1942), economist and academic
- Hans Achterhuis (born 1942), philosopher and academic
- Sir Maarten Wevers, (born 1952), New Zealand civil servant and diplomat
- Henk Kamp (born 1952), retired politician
- Fra Paalman (1945–2020), artist, graphic designer
- Edward Reekers (born 1957), singer and voice actor, member of Kayak
- Willem Tanke (born 1959), organist and recitalist
- Ronald Ophuis (born 1968), artist
- Wim Meulenkamp (born 1973), politician
- Deniz Kuypers (born 1981), writer

=== Sport ===
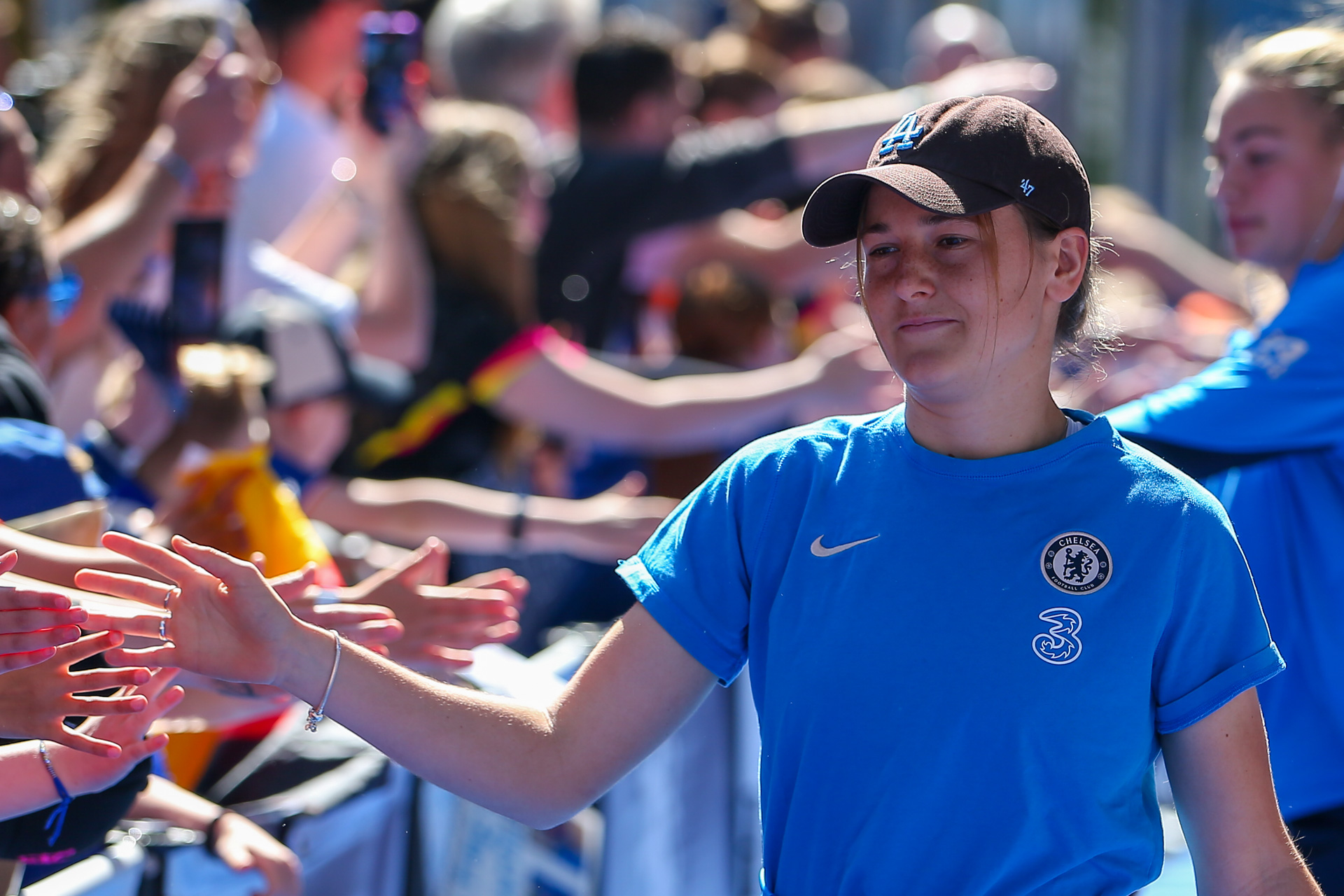
Wieke Kaptein, 2025

- Jan van de Graaff (born 1944), retired Dutch rower, bronze medallist at the 1964 Summer Olympics
- Jan Olde Riekerink, (born 1963), football coach and former professional player
- Kirsten Vlieghuis (born 1976), Dutch freestyle swimmer, won two bronze medals at the 1996 Summer Olympics
- Niels Oude Kamphuis (born 1977), retired footballer, 278 club caps
- Joris Keizer (born 1979), Dutch butterfly swimmer, competed at the 2000 and 2004 Summer Olympics
- Gert-Jan Bruggink (born 1981), Dutch show jumping equestrian, competed at the 2004 Summer Olympics
- Joost Posthuma (born 1981), retired professional road bicycle racer
- Ninos Gouriye (born 1991), Assyrian-Dutch footballer
- Lucas van Foreest (born 2001), Dutch chess grandmaster, 2019 Dutch Chess Champion
- Wieke Kaptein (born 2005), footballer for the Netherlands national team

== Gallery ==
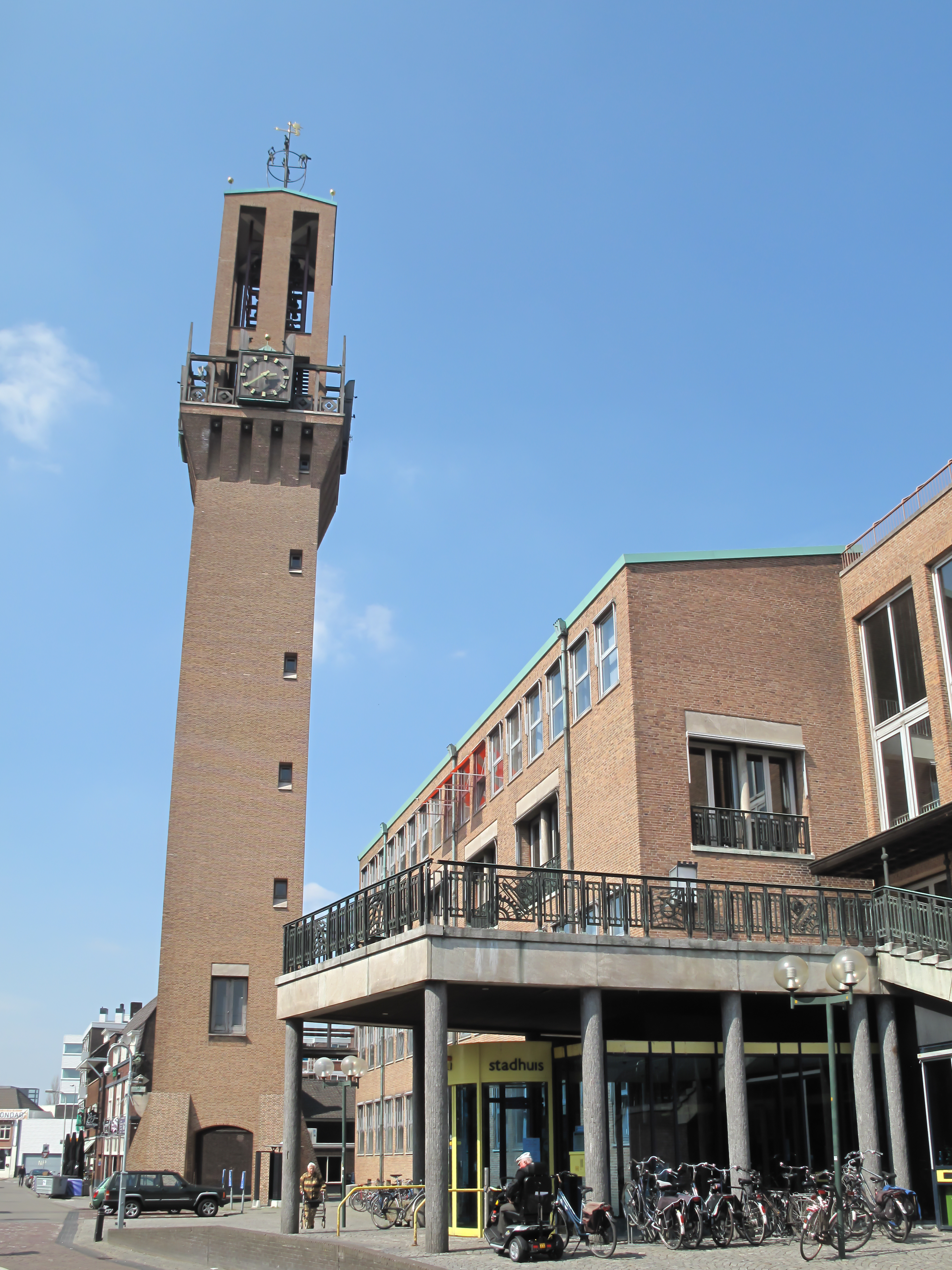
The tower of the townhall

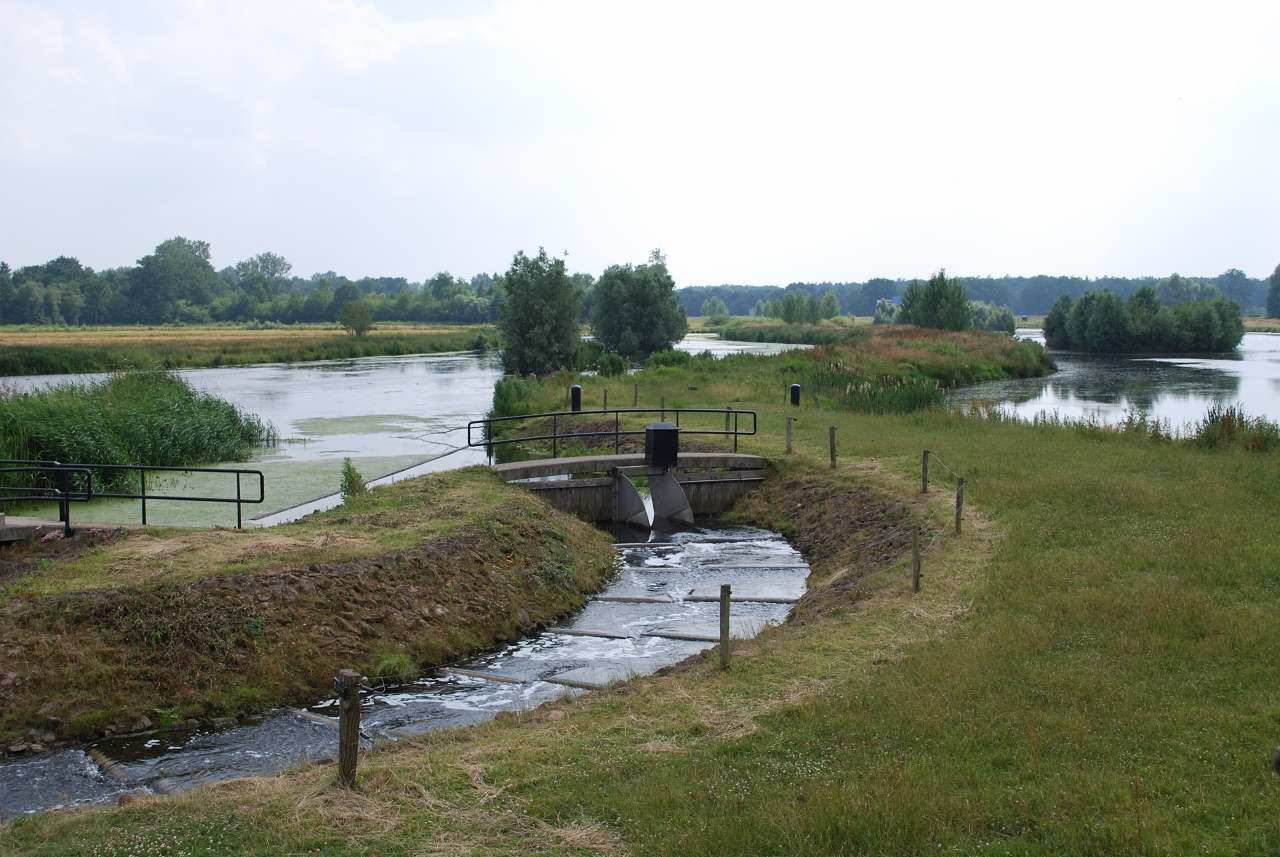
Retentiegebied Woolde, Hengelo

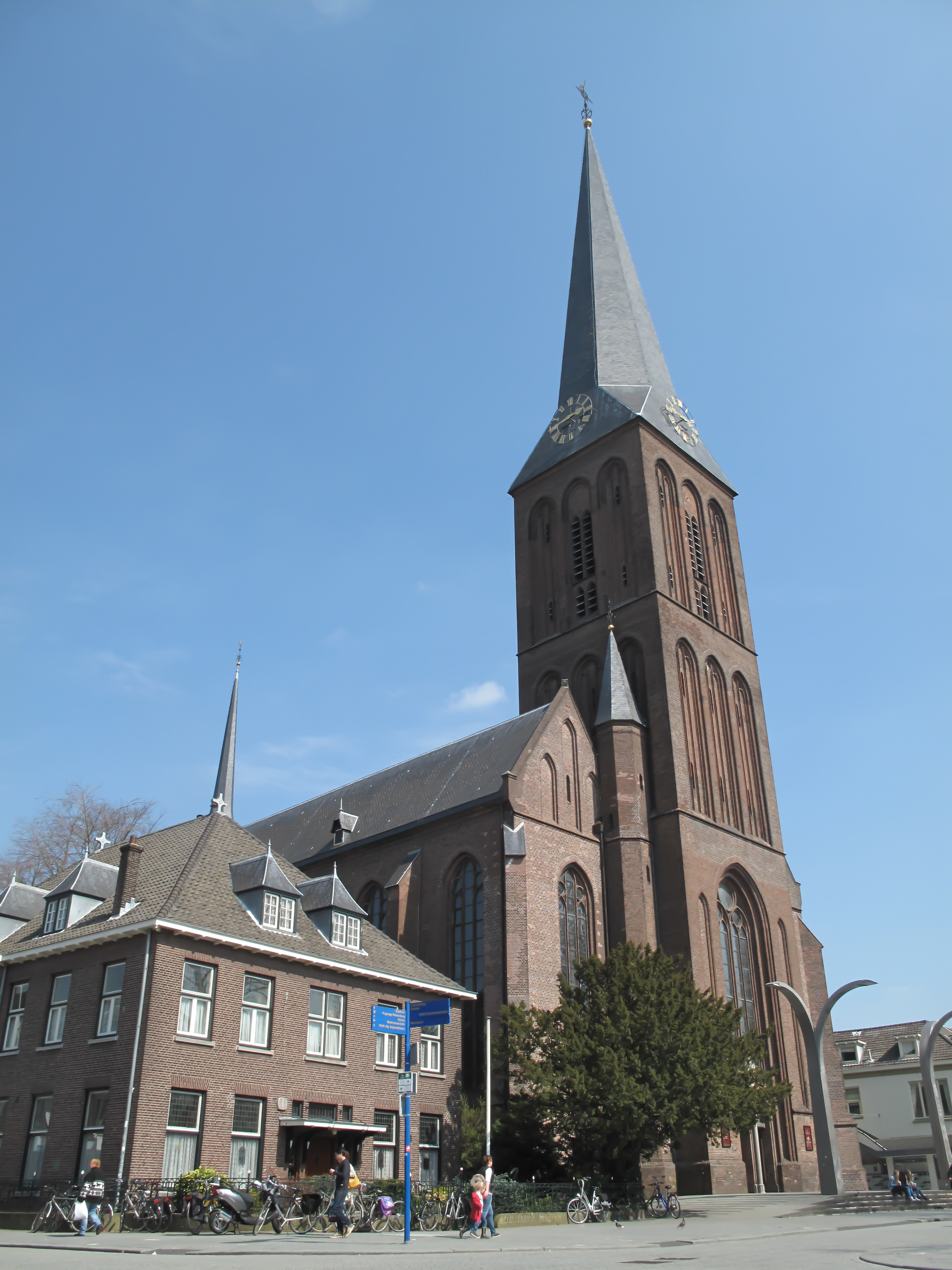
Church: de Sint Lambertusbasiliek

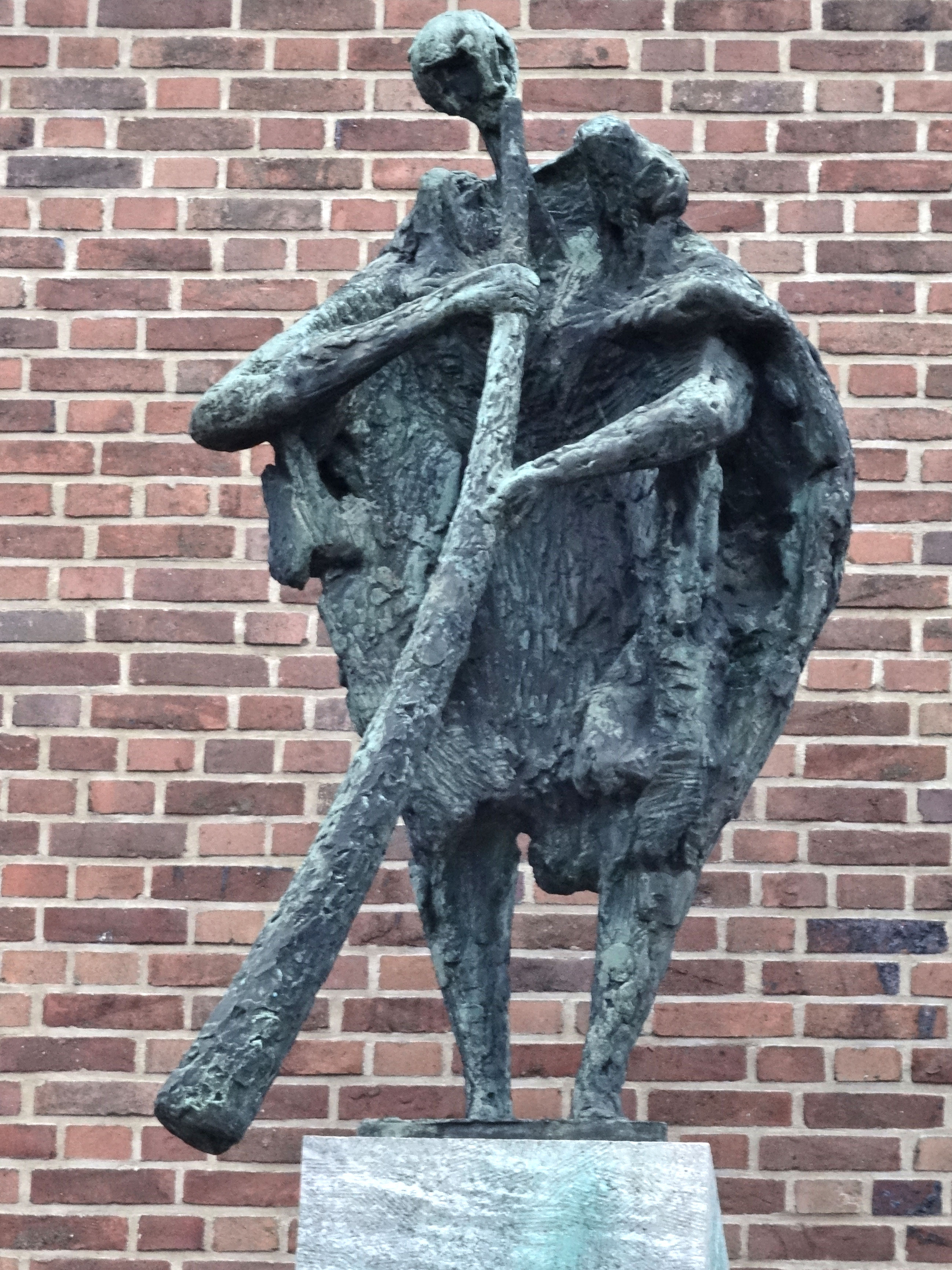
Midwinterhoornblazer (1963) by Jan van Eyl

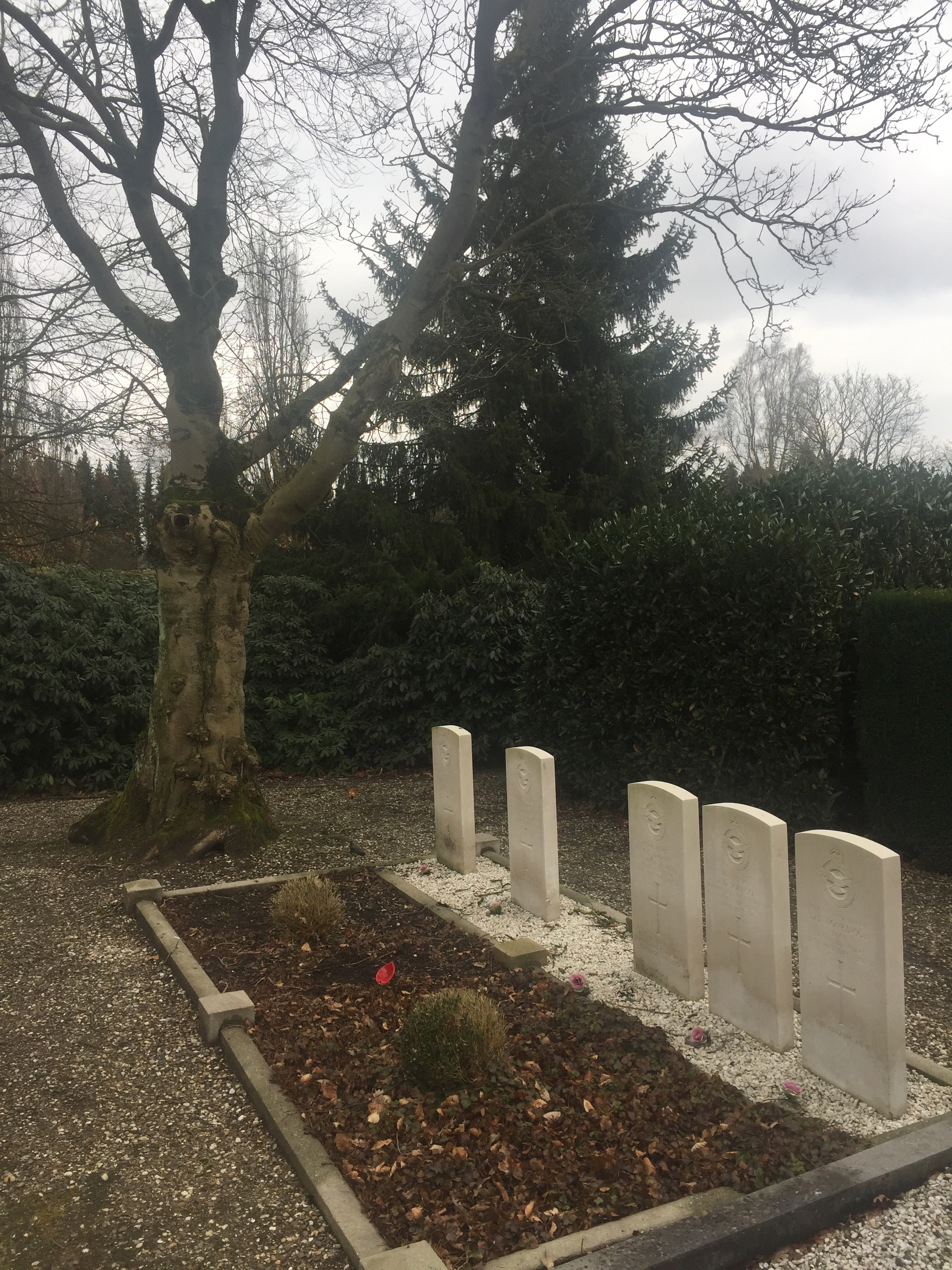
Commonwealth war graves, Hengelo

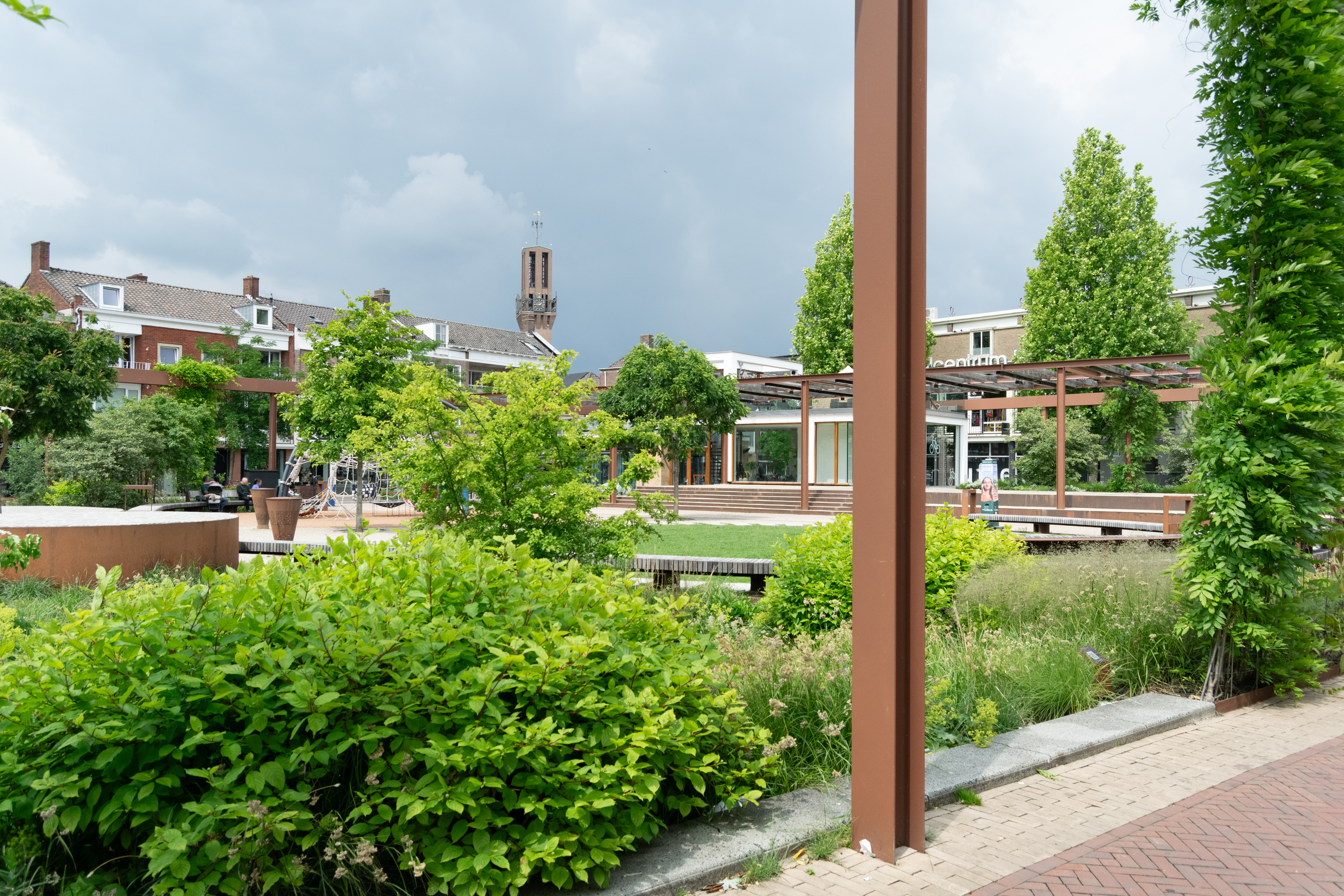
The city centre's market square
