= Almelo–Salzbergen railway =

Railway line in Germany and the Netherlands

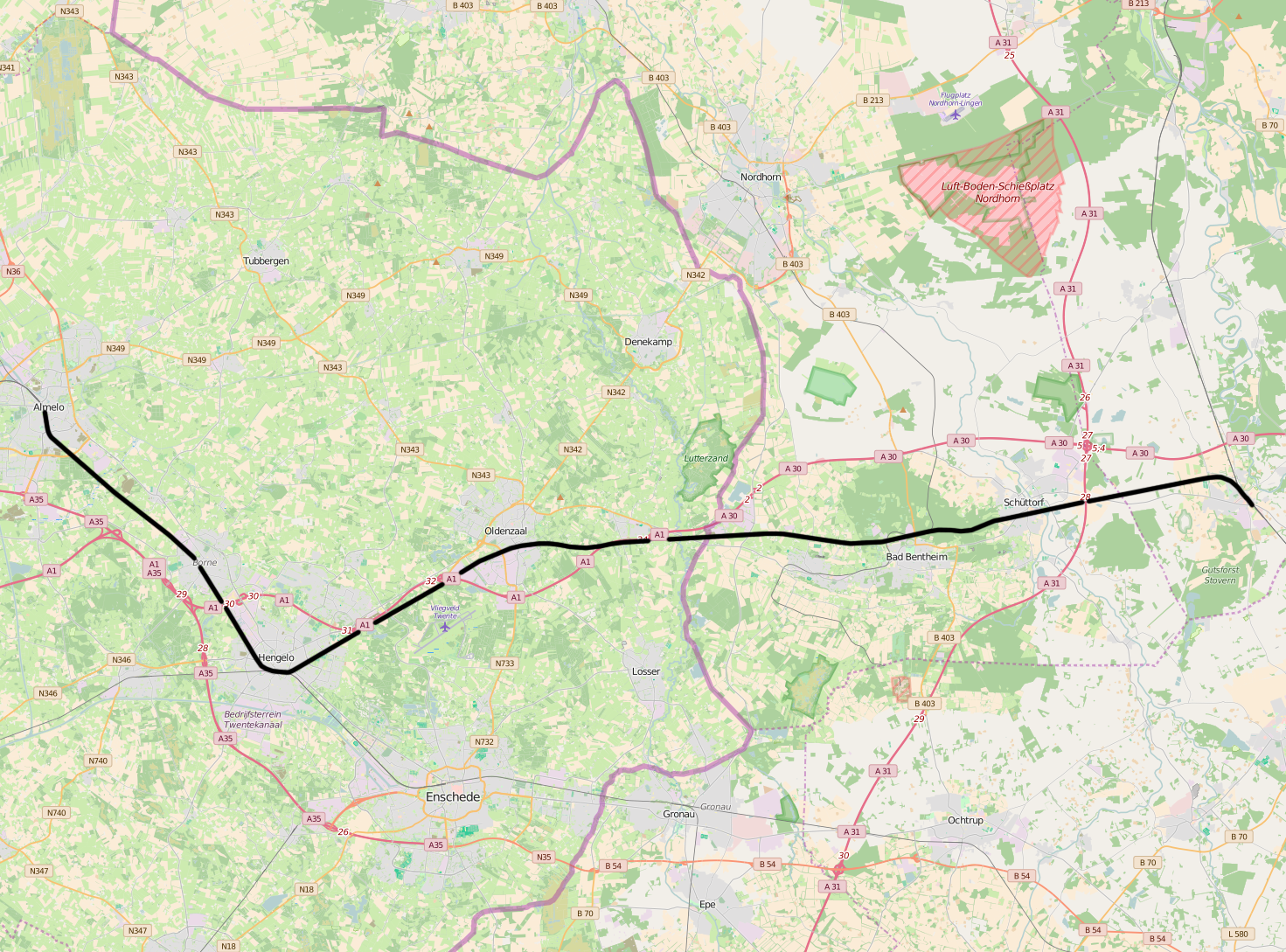

Overview
- Status: Operational
- Locale: Netherlands, Germany
- Termini: Almelo railway station; Salzbergen railway station
- Stations: 9

Service
- Operator(s): Nederlandse Spoorwegen, Deutsche Bahn, Keolis Nederland, Eurobahn

History
- Opened: 18 October 1865

Technical
- Line length: 54.5 km (33.9 mi)
- Number of tracks: Double track
- Track gauge: 1,435 mm (4 ft 8 1/2 in) standard gauge
- Electrification: 1.5 kV DC (Almelo–Bad Bentheim); 15 kV AC (Bad Bentheim–Salzbergen)
- Operating speed: 130 km/h (81 mph) (Almelo–Hengelo); 125 km/h (78 mph) (Hengelo–Salzbergen)

The Almelo–Salzbergen railway is a both Dutch and German 54 kilometre long railway line, that connects Almelo with Salzbergen, offering a rail link between the Netherlands and Germany.

== History ==
The railway was opened by the Spoorweg-Maatschappij Almelo-Salzbergen (English: Almelo-Salzbergen railway company) on 18 October 1865, after construction had started in 1862. In Salzbergen the line connected with the Emsland Railway, which had opened in 1855.

The Dutch section of the line (Almelo–Oldenzaal) was electrified in 1951 and the remainder of the line was electrified in 1976.

From 2006 to 2009 the line through Almelo was the subject of a major project called Almelo Verdiept (Almelo Lowered), which moved the railway line through the centre of Almelo into a lowered trench, with sections of tunnels.

== Route ==
The railway connects Almelo in a south easterly direction with Hengelo. Before Hengelo station the line from Zutphen railway station merges into the route. After the station the line to Enschede railway station branches out in a south easterly direction. From Hengelo the line heads north east towards the former border station of Oldenzaal and heads east across the border to Bad Bentheim. Here the electric current changes, which often results in a change from a Dutch to a German locomotive. At Bad Bentheim the private freight railway to Nordhorn and Coevorden branches out, heading north. The line continues through the countryside, until the line merges with the Emsland Railway from Emden before finishing at Salzbergen.

== Train services ==
The Almelo–Salzbergen railway is used by the following passenger services:

- International services across the whole line (Amsterdam Centraal–Berlin)
- Intercity services between Almelo and Hengelo (Schiphol/The Hague–Enschede)
- Intercity services between Almelo and Hengelo (Zwolle-Enschede)
- Stoptrein services between Almelo and Hengelo (Apeldoorn/Zwolle–Enschede) and Hengelo–Oldenzaal (Zutphen–Oldenzaal)
- Eurobahn services between Hengelo and Salzbergen (Hengelo–Bad Bentheim–Osnabrück–Bielefeld)

== Train types ==
A wide variety of trains can be found regularly on the Almelo–Salzbergen railway:

- Vectron on the whole Amsterdam–Berlin service
- NS Koploper, NS VIRM or NS DDZ on the Schiphol/The Hague–Enschede service between (Schiphol/The Hague-)Almelo and Hengelo
- NS SNG on the Apeldoorn–Enschede service between (Apeldoorn-)Almelo and Hengelo(-Enschede)
- Stadler Flirt on the Zwolle–Enschede service between (Zwolle-)Almelo and Hengelo(-Enschede)
- Stadler Flirt on the Hengelo–Bielefeld service between Hengelo and Salzbergen(-Bielefeld)
- Syntus Lint41 on the Zutphen–Oldenzaal service between (Zutphen-)Hengelo and Oldenzaal.

There are also large number of freight trains operating along the line.

== Gallery ==
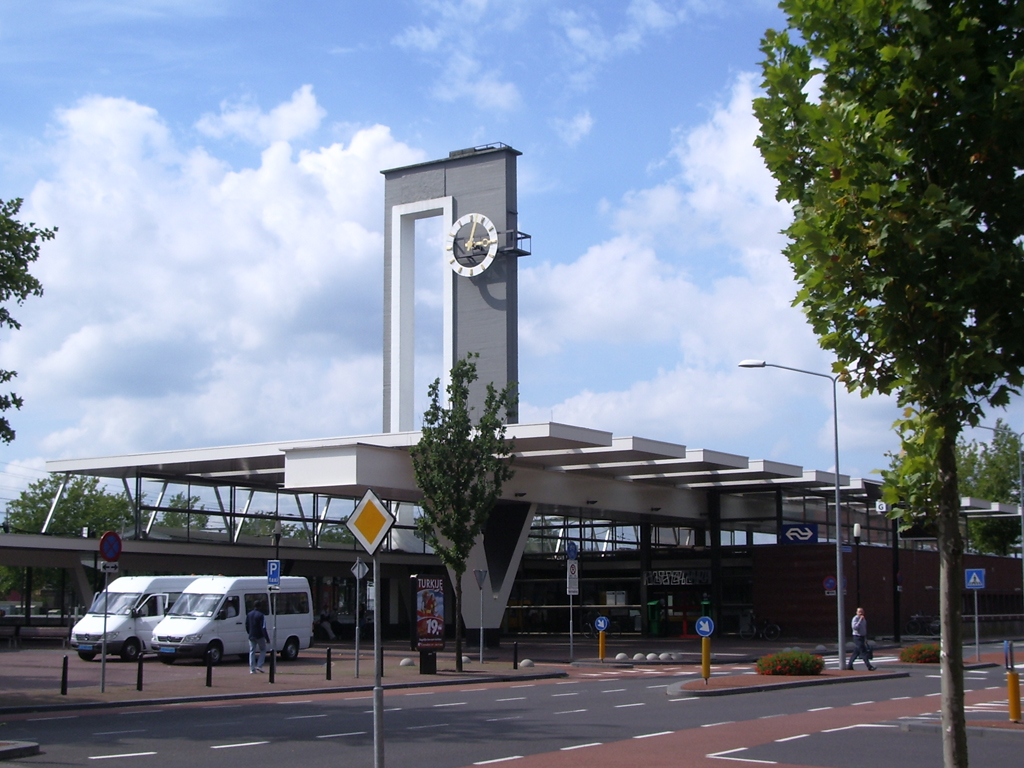
Almelo railway station

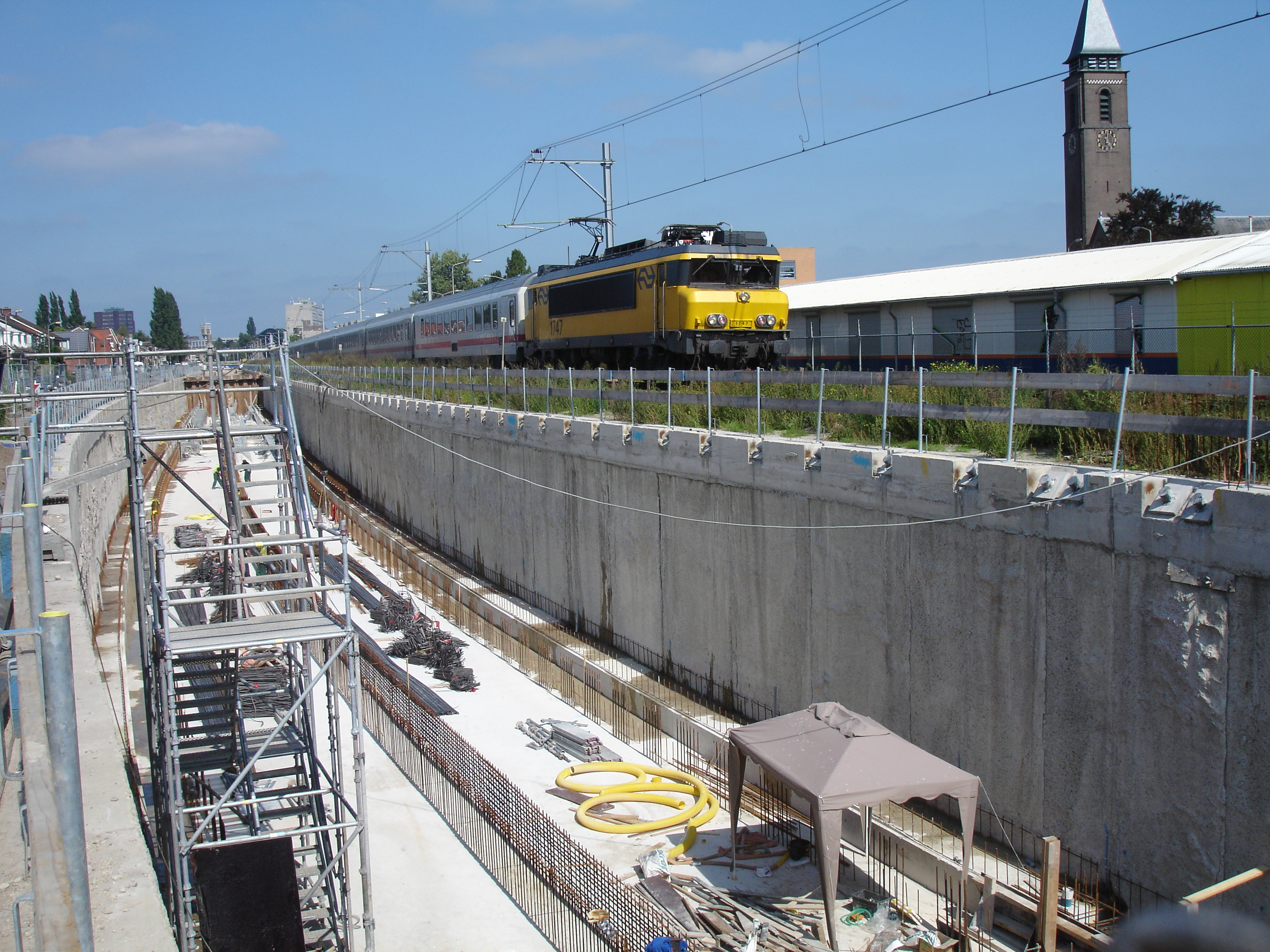
An International train passing the Almelo Verdiept project

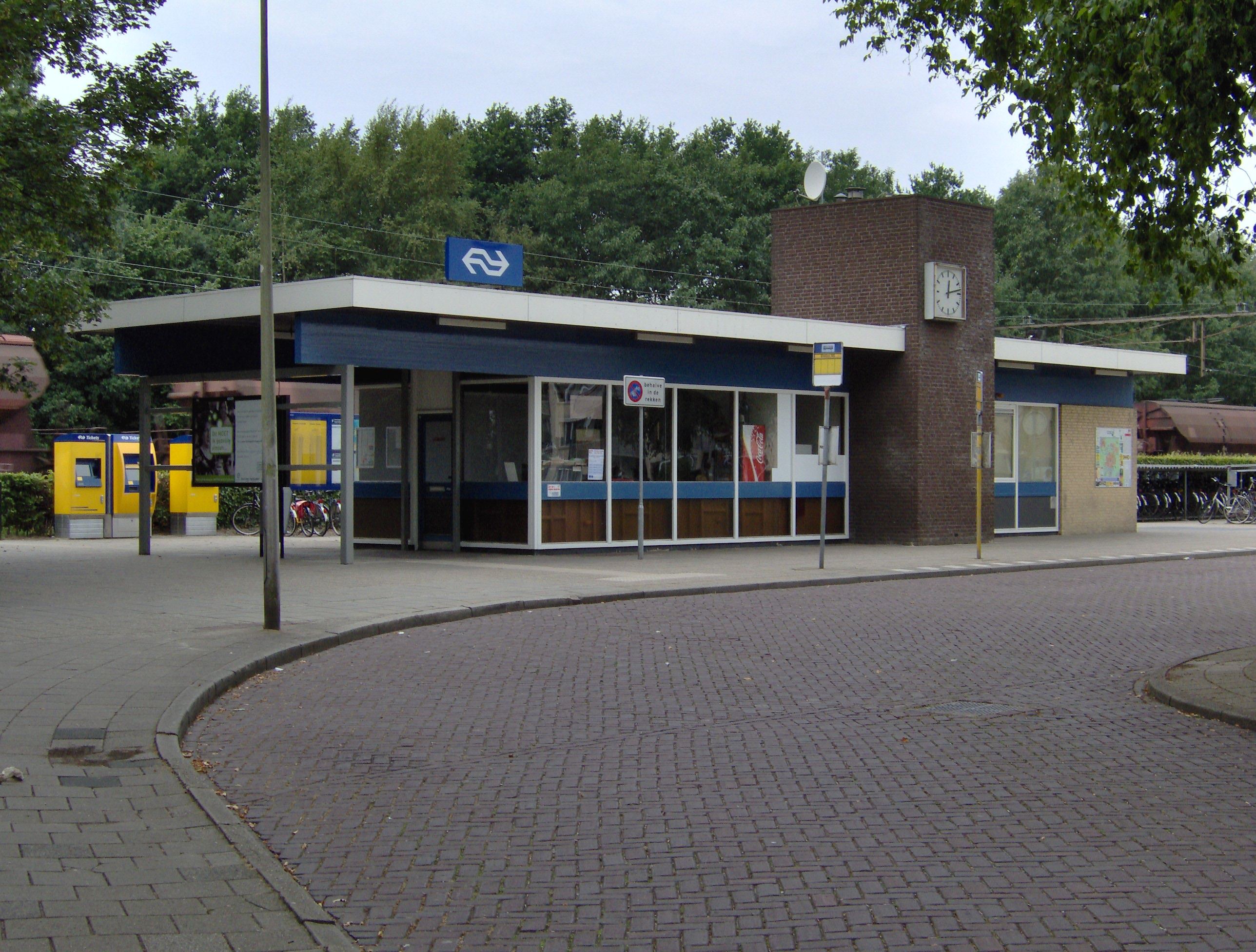
Borne railway station

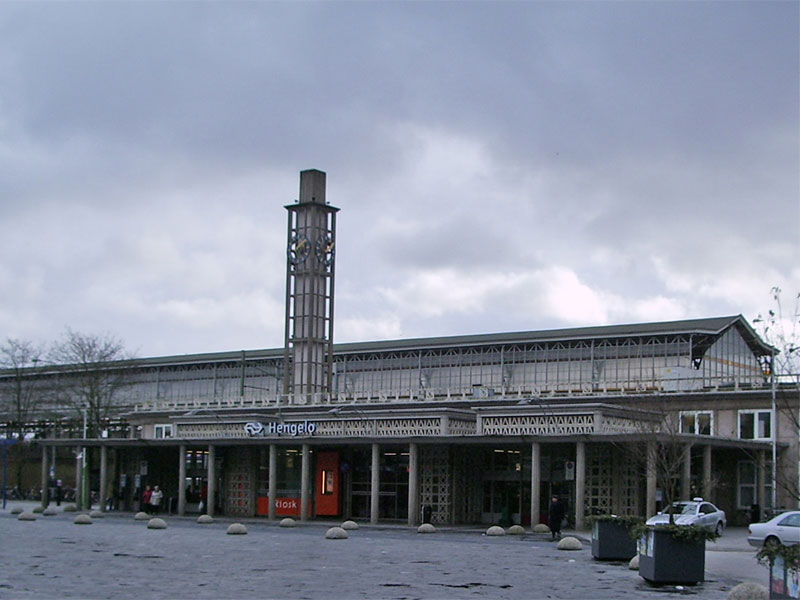
Hengelo railway station

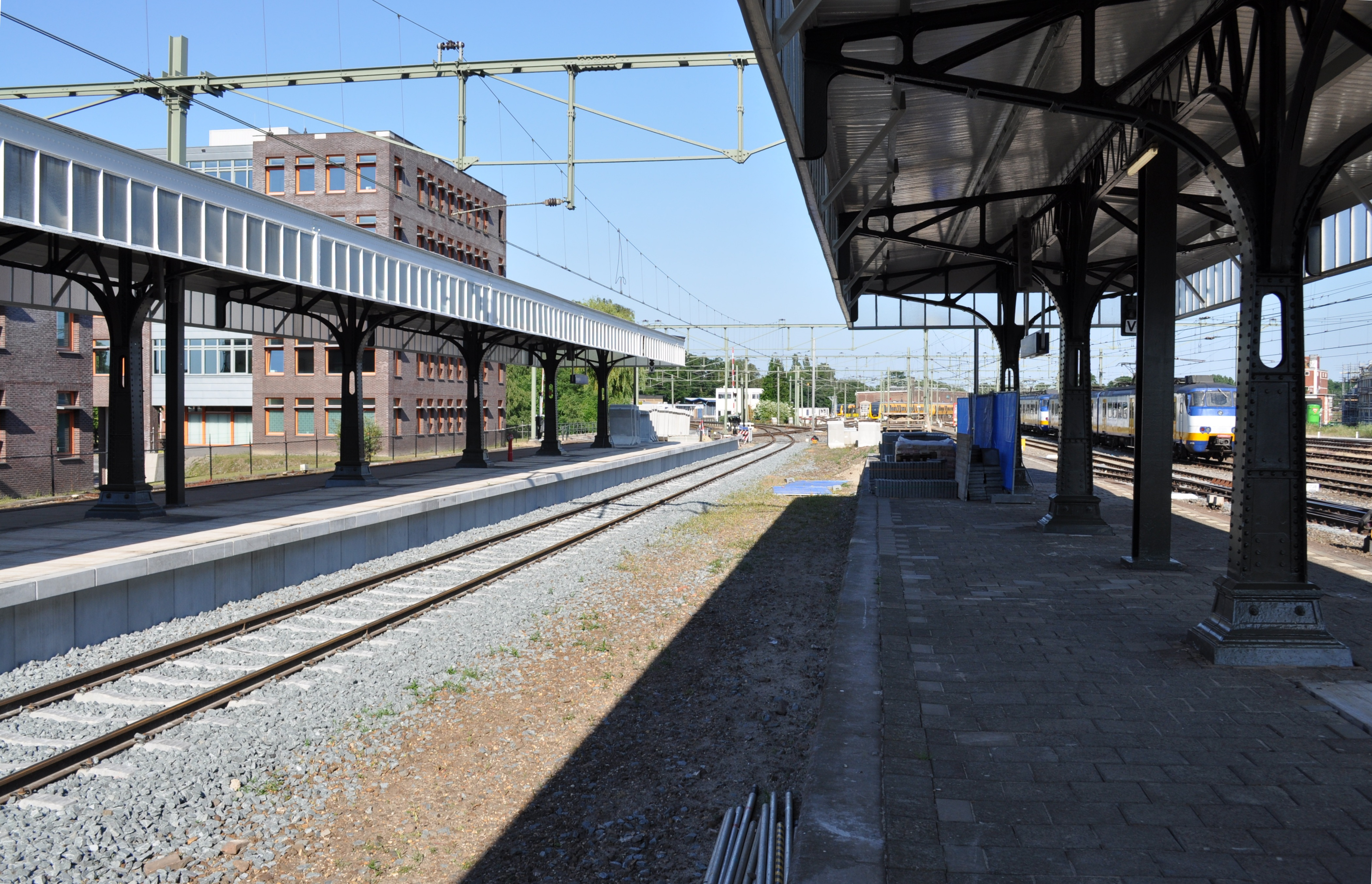
Hengelo railway station

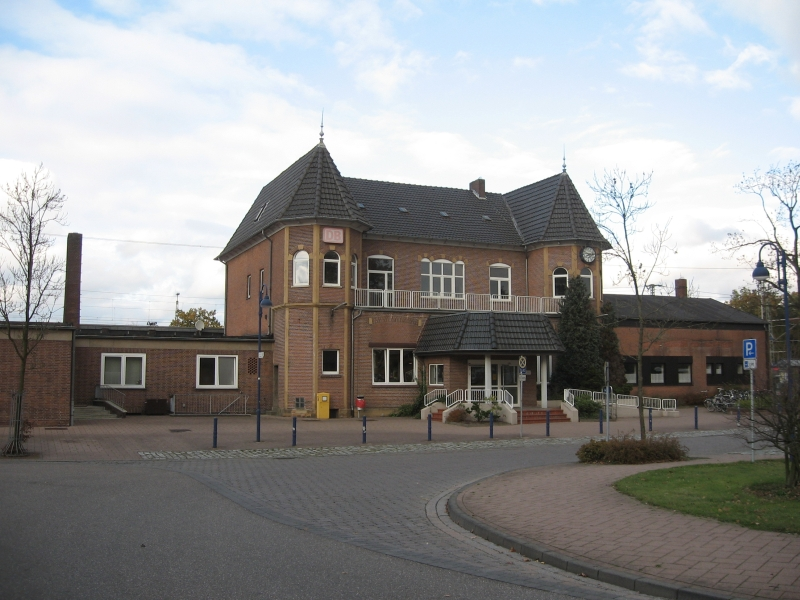
Bad Bentheim railway station

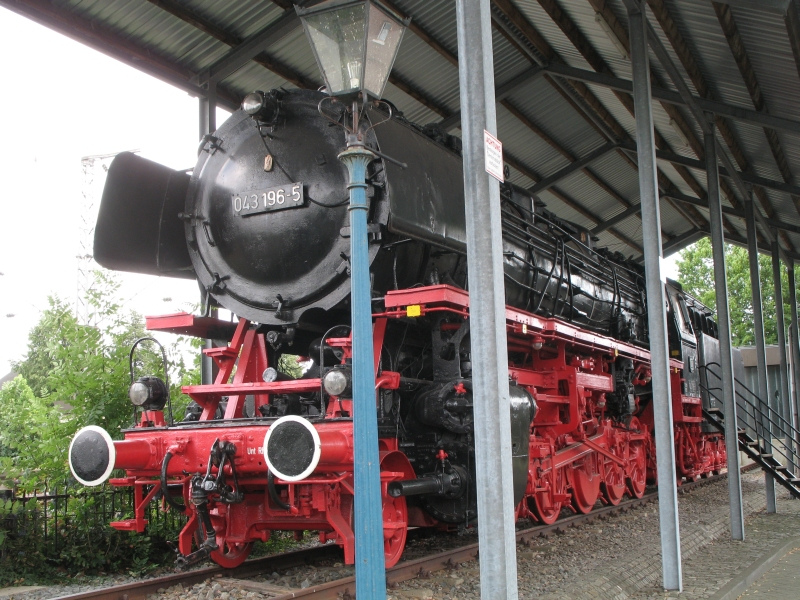
The steam train at Salzbergen
