= Kelderman =

Kelderman is a surname of Dutch origin. People with that name include:

- Hans Kelderman (born 1966), Dutch rower
- Jaap Kelderman (1928–1976), Dutch footballer
- Janouk Kelderman (born 1991), Dutch actress, singer and television presenter
- Kris Kelderman (born 1968), American soccer coach and former player
- Wilco Kelderman (born 1991), Dutch cyclist

== See also ==
- Keldermans family (14th-16th century), of artists from Mechelen, in modern Belgium
  - Rombout II Keldermans (c. 1460 - 1531), architect
