= Oosseld =

Coordinates: 51.9489°N 6.3117°E

Bloemenbuurt Oosselt Oosseld
- District of Doetinchem
- Interactive map of Bloemenbuurt
- Country: Netherlands
- Province: Gelderland
- COROP: Achterhoek
- City: Doetinchem

Population (2017)
  - Total: 2,830
- Time zone: UTC+1 (CET)
- Postal code: 7004

Oosseld or Oosselt, also known as De Bloemenbuurt, is a district within, and former hamlet (buurtschap) of the municipality of Doetinchem, located in the Dutch province of Gelderland. Until 1919 Oosseld belonged to the municipality Ambt Doetinchem. Koekendaal and Ter Gun are also part of Ooseld.

== History ==
At the first population census, following the introduction of the Burgerlijke Stand, Oosseld consisted of 79 houses and 580 citizens. In 1870 there were 741 citizens, and by 1890 the population had once again decreased, this time to 572. The Roman Catholic church of Ter Gun had services held by the pastor of Wijnbergen, which nowadays is part of the municipality of Doetinchem, but was included in the municipality of Bergh at that time.

Dissecting the district is the train route Winterswijk - Zevenaar. On this route the hamlet had a stop, shared with Gaanderen, Stopplaats Gaanderen-Oosselt.

In 2006 work started on renovating the district. This was done by demolishing older buildings and replacing them with new housing. Notable buildings that were demolished were the three apartment buildings alongside the highway A18 (Arnhem - Varsseveld). The mall was also completely renovated. In 2010 the renovation work was largely finished. The district used to attract inhabitants with a lower income, but this changed due to the new housing which typically has a higher rent.
