= Oversteegen =

Oversteegen is a Dutch surname. Notable people with the surname include:

- Freddie Oversteegen (1925–2018), Dutch resistance member
- Truus Menger-Oversteegen (1923–2016), Dutch sculptor, painter and resistance member

== See also ==
- Overstegen
