= Keppel, Netherlands =

Former municipality in Gelderland

Coordinates: 52°00′09″N 6°12′43″E

Keppel is a former municipality in the Dutch province of Gelderland, consisting of the villages of Laag-Keppel and Hoog-Keppel. It existed until 1818, when it merged with Hummelo to form the new municipality of Hummelo en Keppel.
