= Hummelo =

- Village
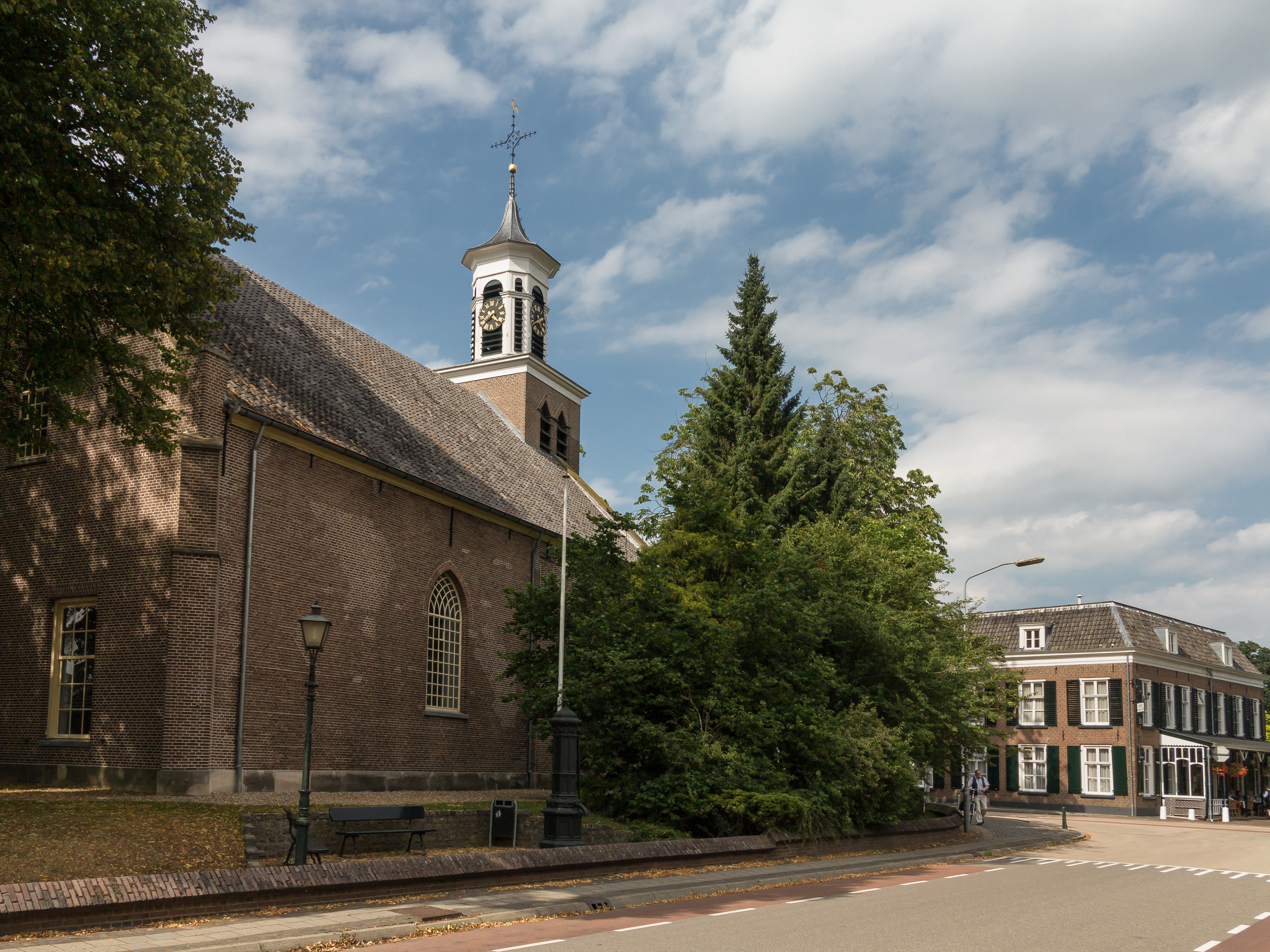
- Hummelo, reformed church

- Location in the province of Gelderland Hummelo (Netherlands)
- Coordinates: 52°0′11″N 6°14′4″E
- Country: Netherlands
- Province: Gelderland
- Municipality: Bronckhorst

Area
  - Total: 12.67 km^{2} (4.89 sq mi)
- Elevation: 12 m (39 ft)

Population (2021)
  - Total: 1,465
  - Density: 115.6/km^{2} (299.5/sq mi)
- Time zone: UTC+1 (CET)
  - Summer (DST): UTC+2 (CEST)
- Postal code: 6999
- Dialing code: 0314

Hummelo is a village in the Dutch province of Gelderland. It is located in the municipality of Bronckhorst, about 6 km northwest of Doetinchem.

Hummelo was a separate municipality until 1818, when the area was divided between Ambt Doetinchem and Hummelo en Keppel. Archeological finds in the area date to the upper Palaeolithic period.

Hummelo is known as the birthplace of the Dutch rock band Normaal (Normal), which was founded in 1975.

== Notable people ==
- Koen Huntelaar (born 1998), footballer
- Bennie Jolink (born 1946), singer and co-founder of Normaal

== Gallery ==
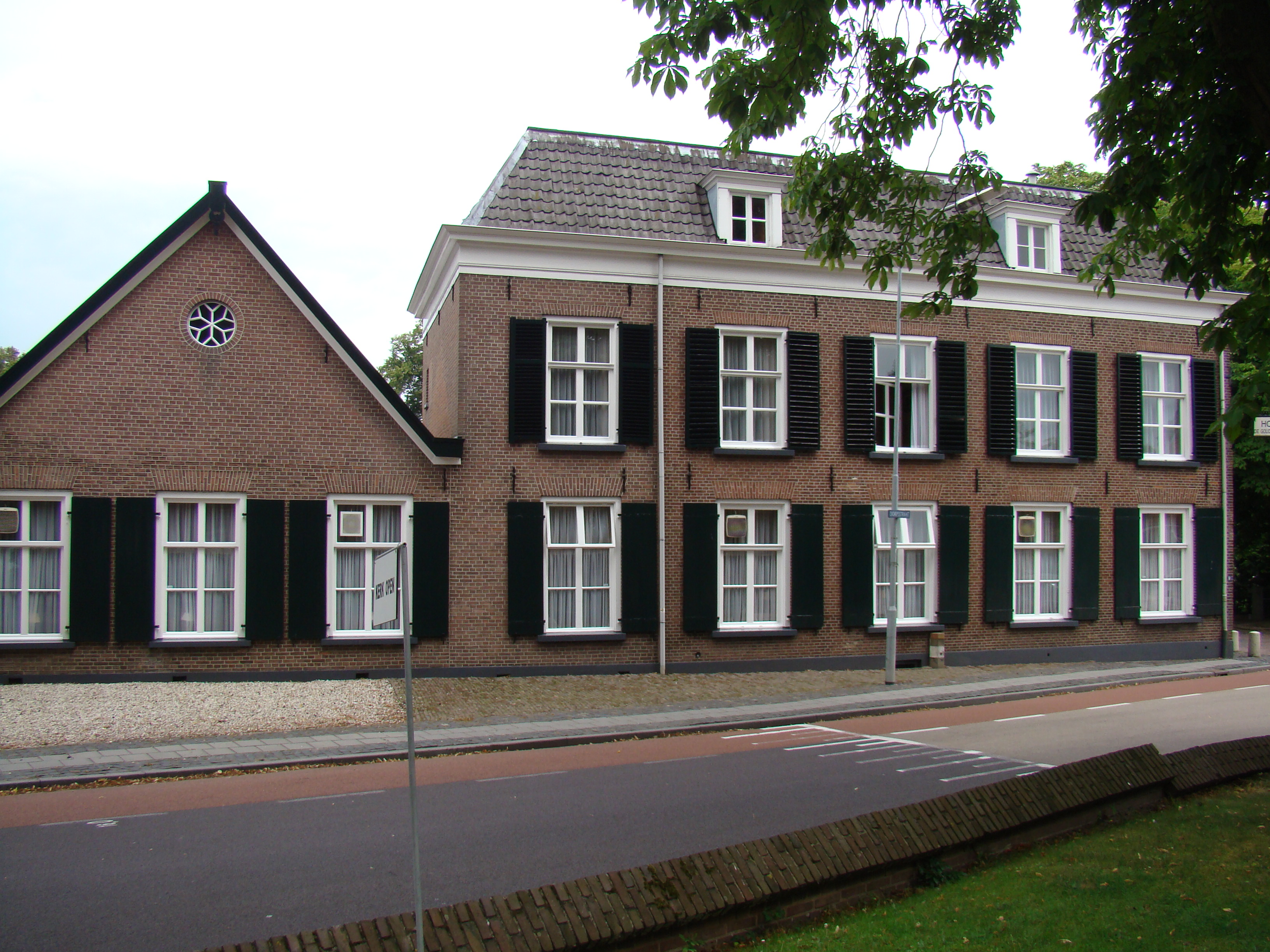
House in Hummelo

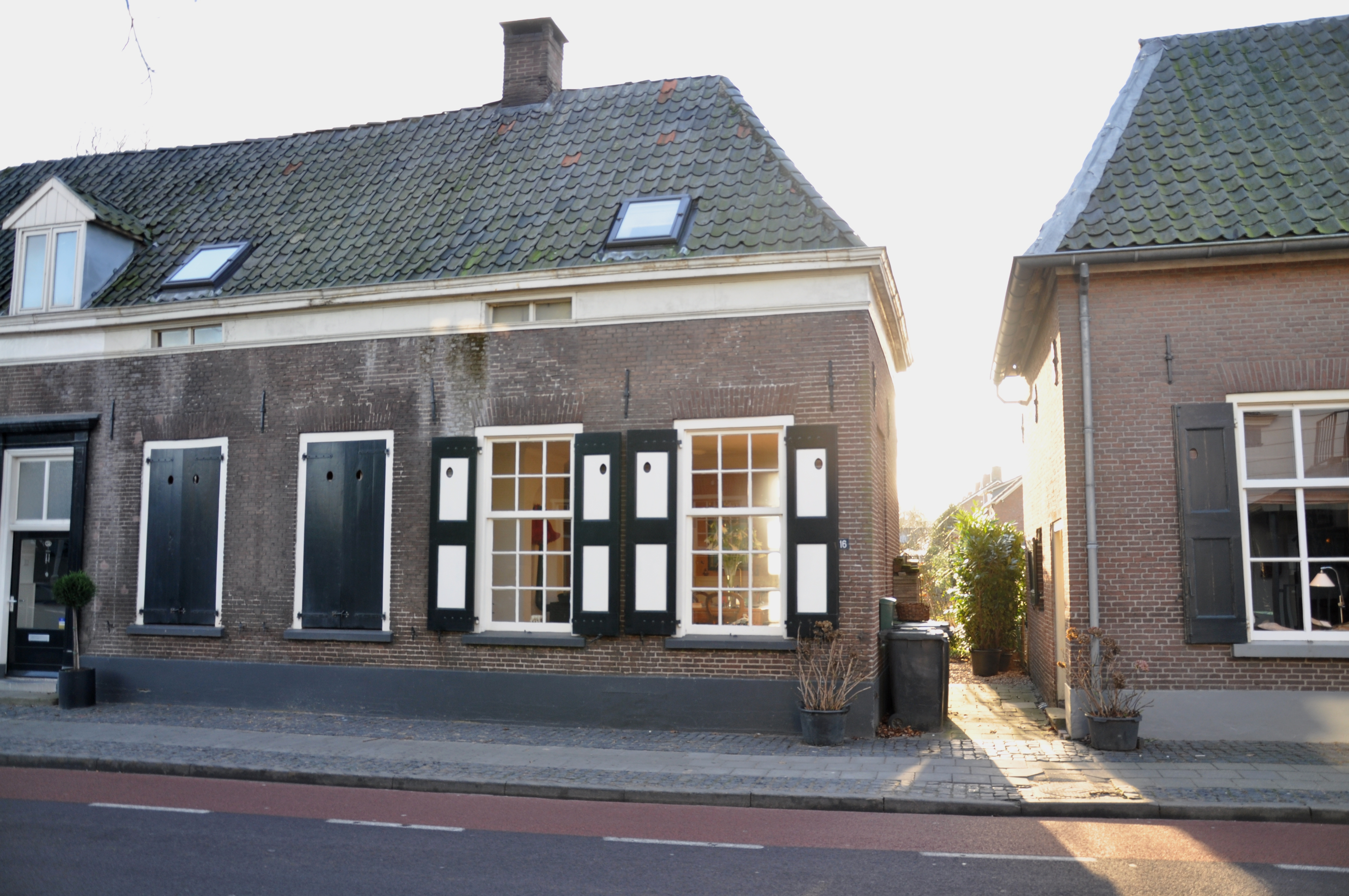
House in Hummelo

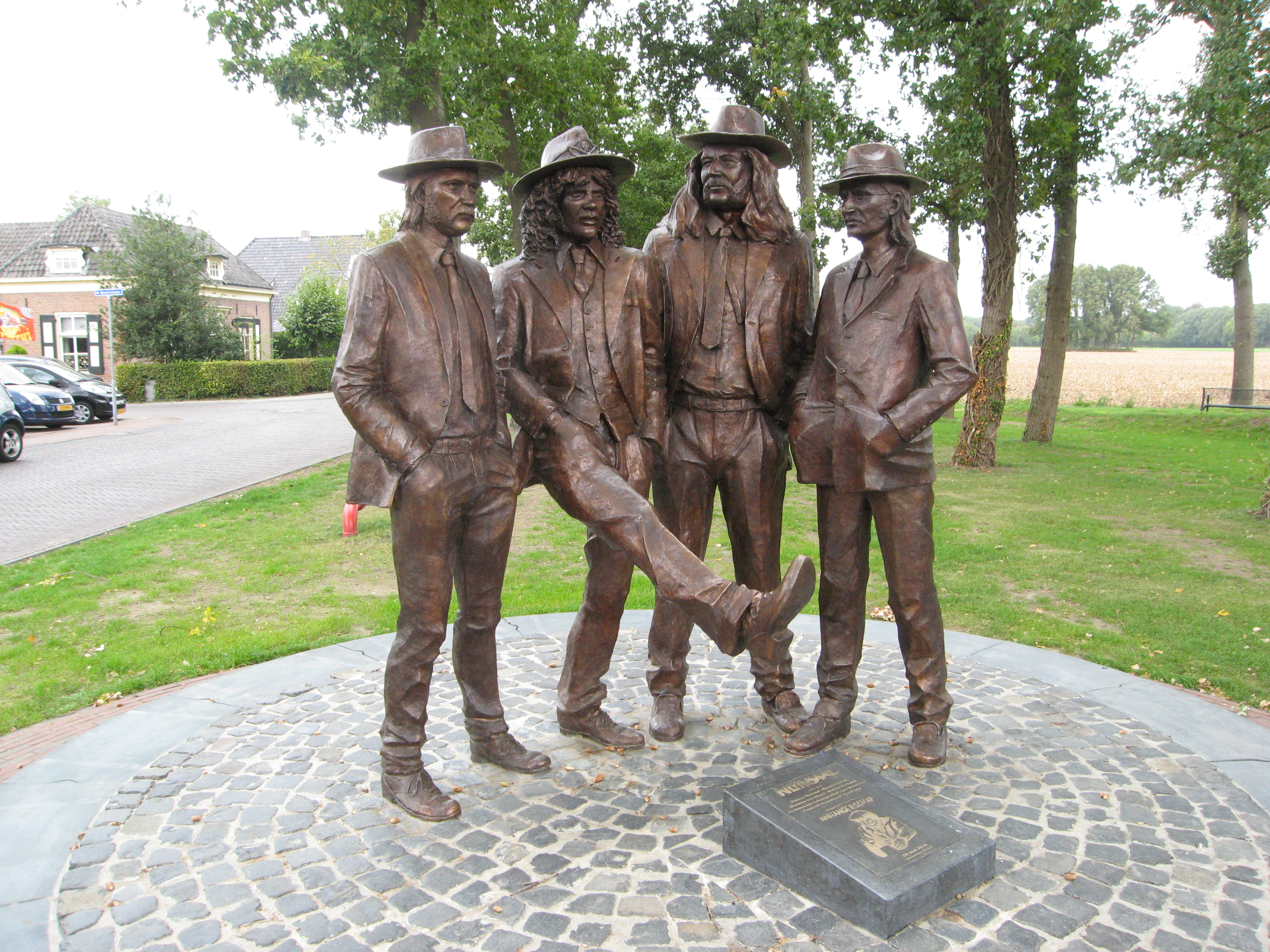
Normaal monument

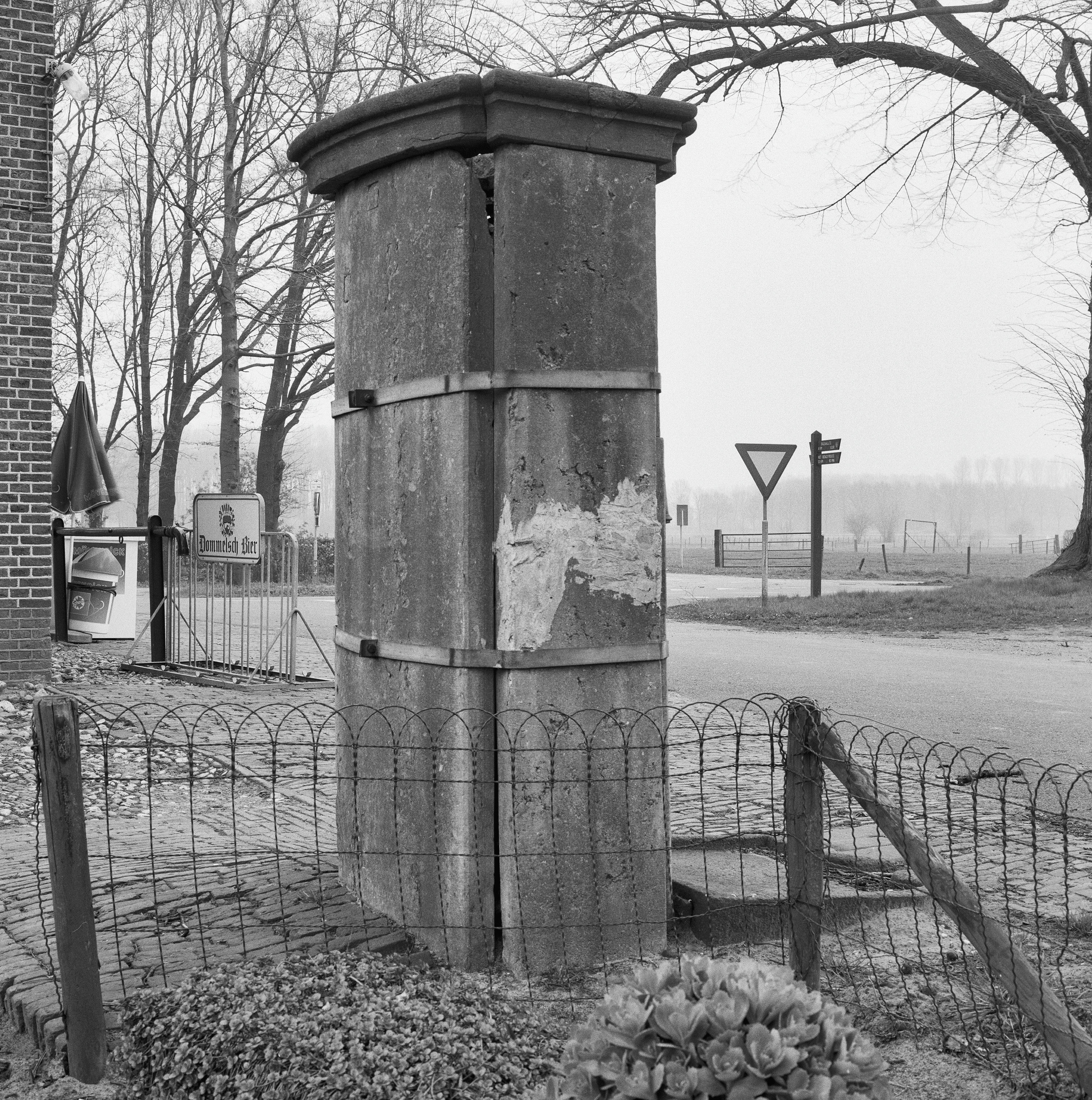
Water pump
