= Stad Doetinchem =

Coordinates: 51.965529°N 6.288943°E

Stad Doetinchem is a former municipality in the Dutch province of Gelderland. It consisted of the city of Doetinchem and its immediate surroundings. The larger surrounding countryside was a separate municipality, called Ambt Doetinchem.

Stad Doetinchem existed until 1920, when it merged with Ambt Doetinchem to form a single municipality Doetinchem.
