= Nieuw-Wehl =

- Village
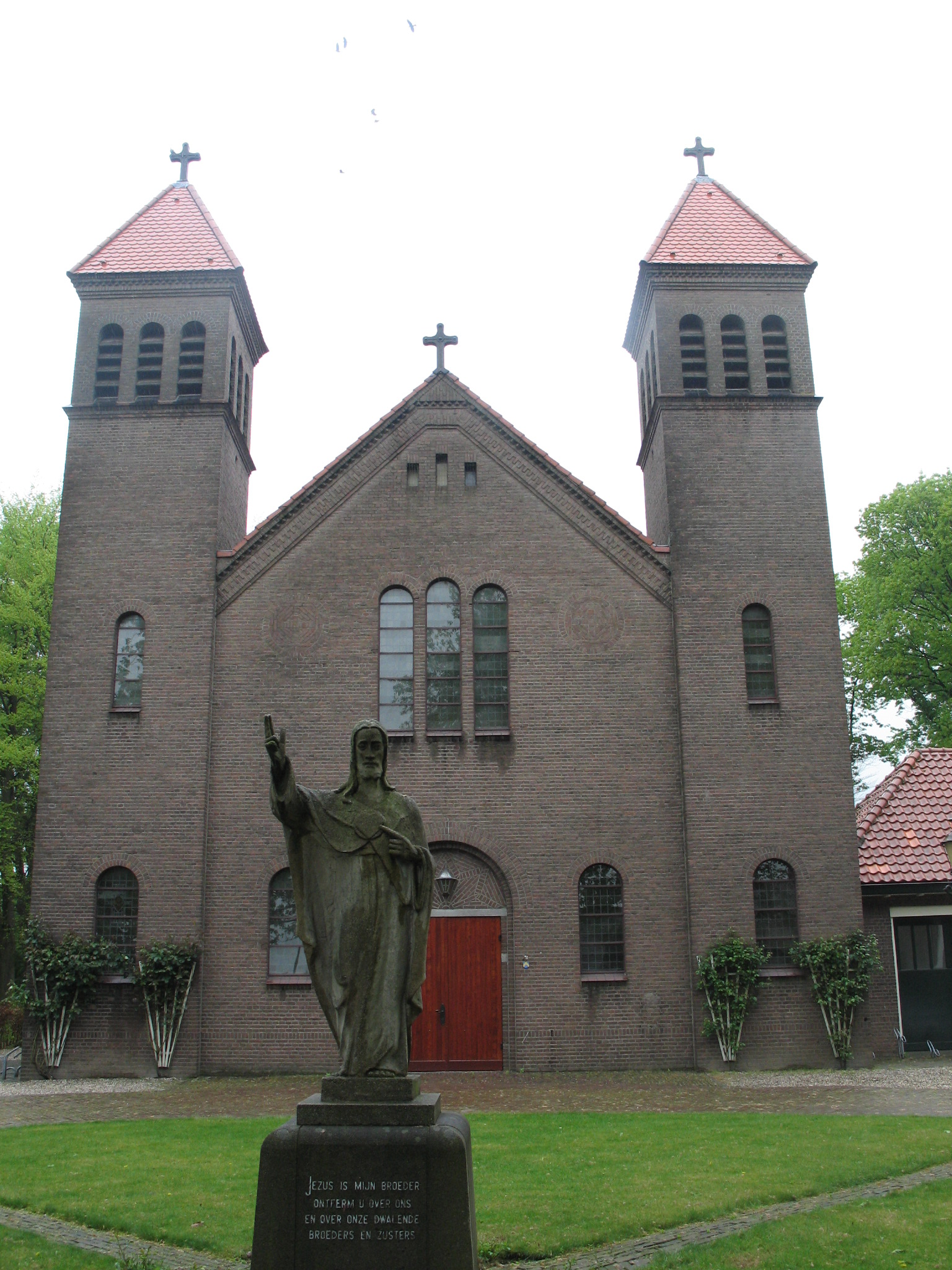
- Nieuw-Wehl church

- Location in the province of Gelderland Nieuw-Wehl (Netherlands)
- Coordinates: 51°58′2″N 6°10′18″E
- Country: Netherlands
- Province: Gelderland
- Municipality: Doetinchem

Area
  - Total: 6.66 km^{2} (2.57 sq mi)
- Elevation: 14 m (46 ft)

Population (2021)
  - Total: 1,300
  - Density: 200/km^{2} (510/sq mi)
- Time zone: UTC+1 (CET)
  - Summer (DST): UTC+2 (CEST)
- Postal code: 7031
- Dialing code: 0314

Nieuw-Wehl is a village in the eastern Netherlands, about 10 km west of Doetinchem. Before 1 January 2005, it was part of the municipality of Wehl, along with neighboring village Wehl. After the division, Nieuw-Wehl joined the municipality of Doetinchem.

Nieuw-Wehl was first mentioned between 1830 and 1855 as "Achter Wehl", meaning behind Wehl. It started to develop in the early 20th century. In 1925, a Roman Catholic church was built. In 1933, the name officially changed to Nieuw-Wehl. The grist mill Bernadette was built in 1861 and restored in 1965 and 1998.

== Gallery ==
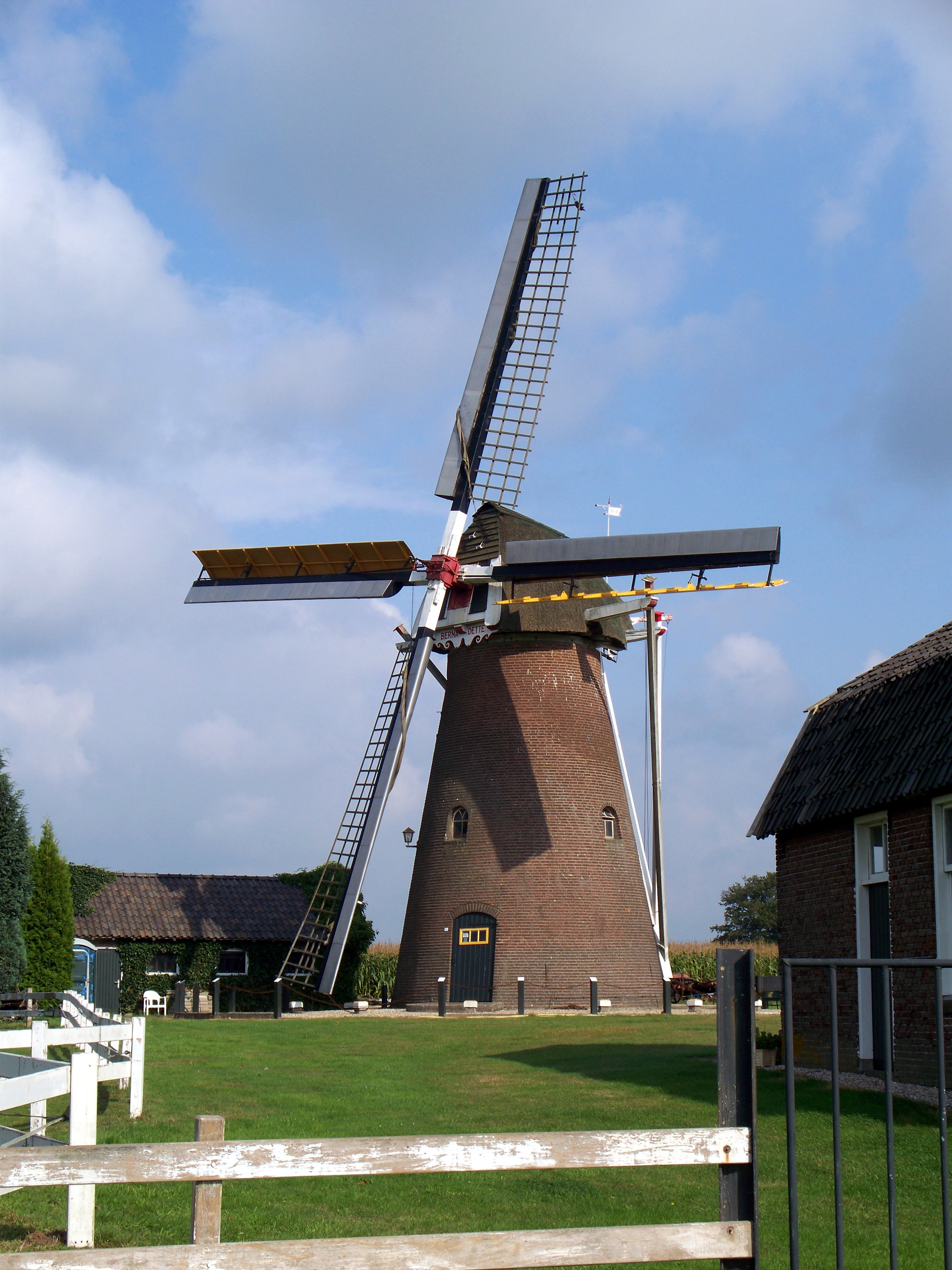
The Bernadette

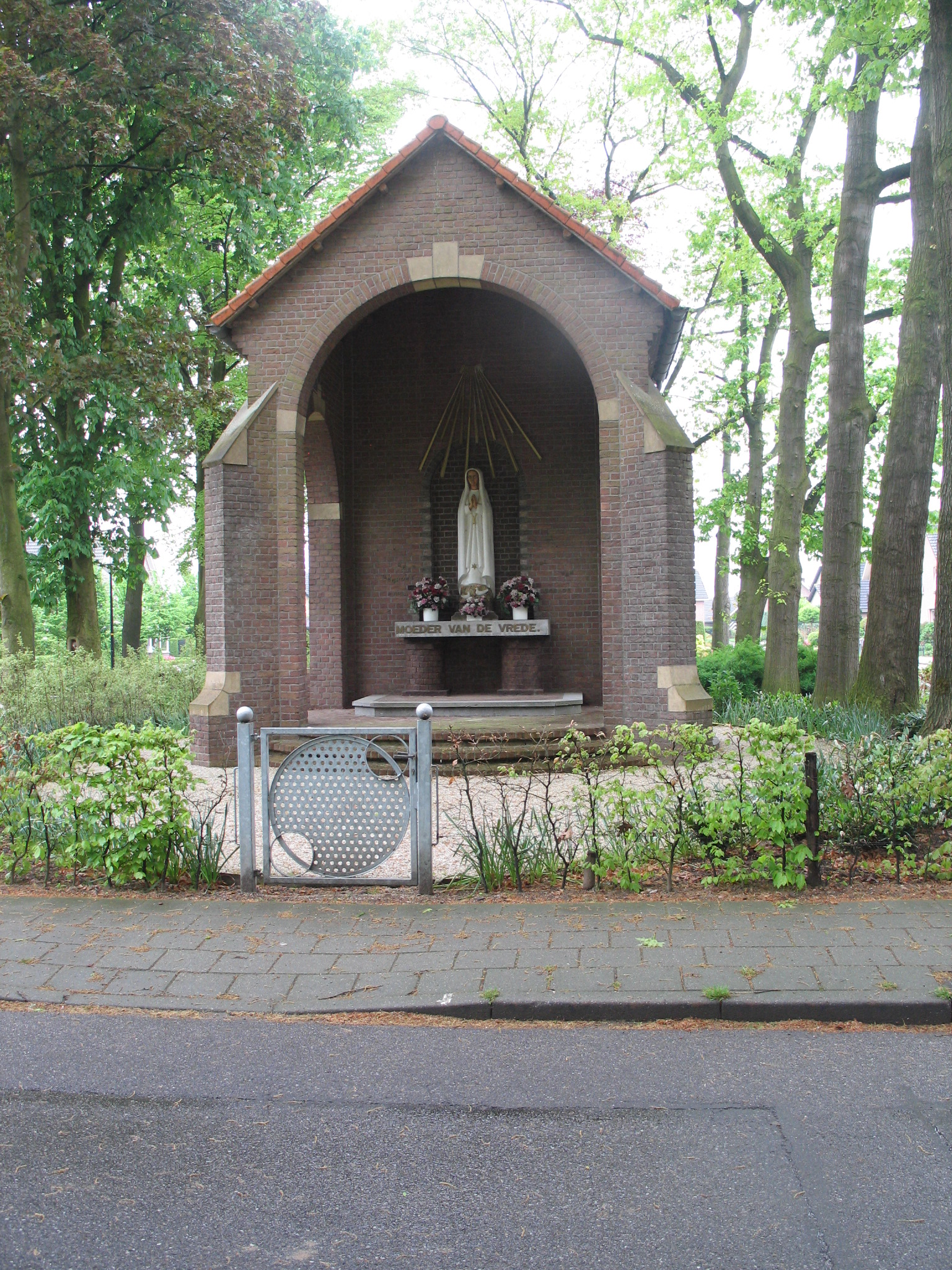
Chapel in Nieuw-Wehl
