= Tim Sanders (footballer) =

Dutch footballer

Personal information
- Full name: Tim Sanders
- Date of birth: 6 January 1986 (age 40)
- Place of birth: Wehl, Netherlands
- Height: 1.93 m (6 ft 4 in)
- Position: Centre-back

Youth career
- SV Concordia-Wehl
- De Graafschap

Senior career*
Years	Team	Apps	(Gls)
2007–2010	SV Hö/Nie		
2010–2015	Achilles '29	96	(6)
2015–2017	Spakenburg	44	(3)
2017–2019	DFS		
- * Club domestic league appearances and goals

Tim Sanders (born 6 January 1986 in Wehl) is a retired footballer who played as a centre-back. He formerly played for the German SV Hönnepel-Niedermörmter. He is a youth product from SV Concordia-Wehl and De Graafschap.
