= IJzevoorde =

- Hamlet
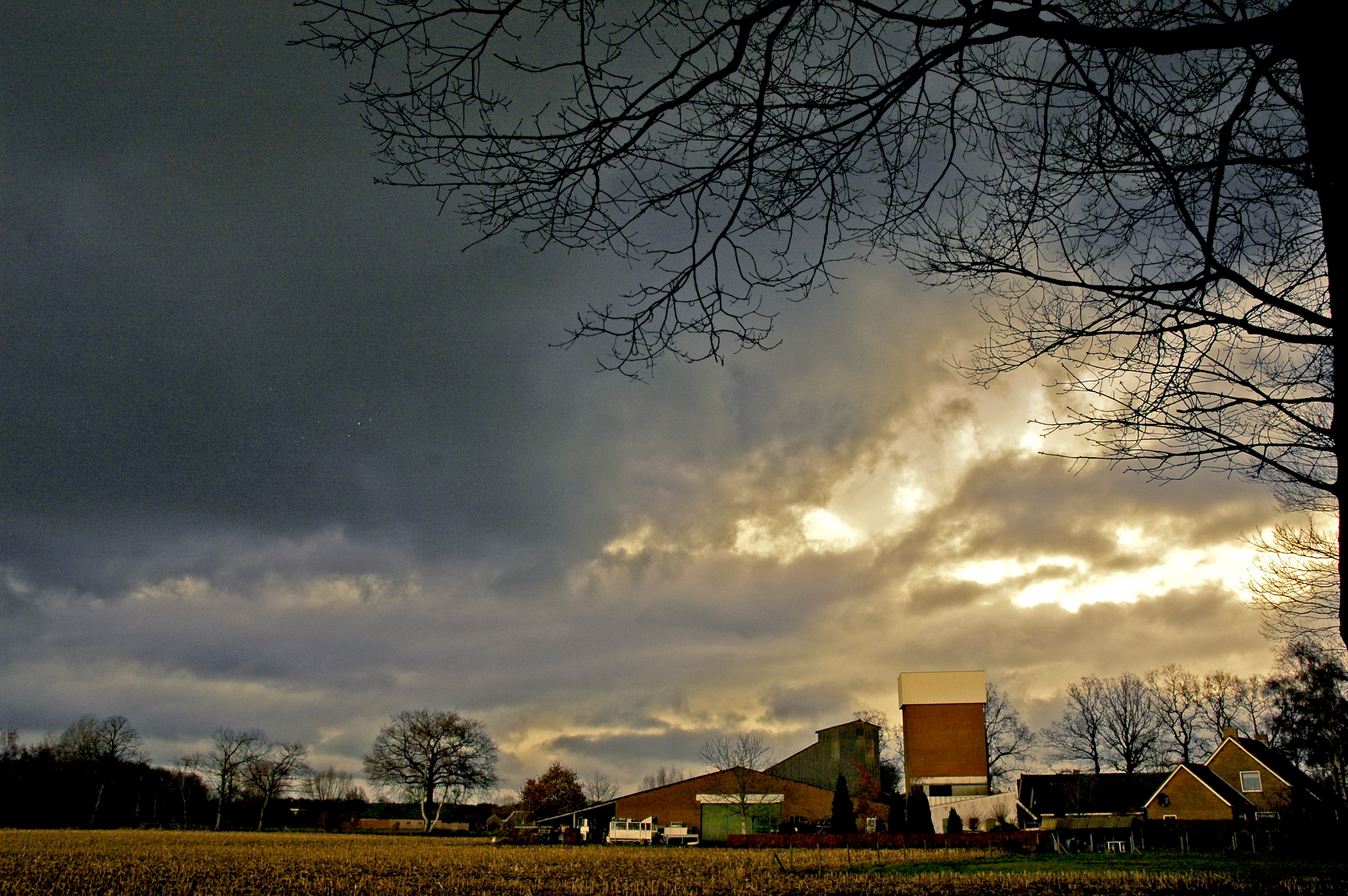
- Sunset on IJzevoorde

- Location in the province of Gelderland IJzevoorde (Netherlands)
- Coordinates: 51°58′29″N 6°21′28″E
- Country: Netherlands
- Province: Gelderland
- Municipality: Doetinchem; Bronckhorst

Area
  - Total: 4.10 km^{2} (1.58 sq mi)
- Elevation: 14 m (46 ft)

Population (2021)
  - Total: 265
  - Density: 64.6/km^{2} (167/sq mi)
- Time zone: UTC+1 (CET)
  - Summer (DST): UTC+2 (CEST)
- Postal code: 7004
- Dialing code: 0314

IJzevoorde is a hamlet in the municipalities of Doetinchem and Bronckhorst in the province of Gelderland in the east part of the Netherlands.

== Overview ==
It was first mentioned in 1235 as Ysenuort and means fordable place through the IJze. The postal authorities have placed it under Doetinchem. In 1840, it was home to 839 people.

It includes a school, a kindergarten, a gym, a bar and a small stage. The school has about 60 students and there are a lot of farmers' children attending the school. IJzevoorde also has a small campground.

Close to IJzevoorde lies the Slangenburg Castle, referring to a little river called the Slinge.
