= Benninkmolen, Doetinchem =

Dutch windmill

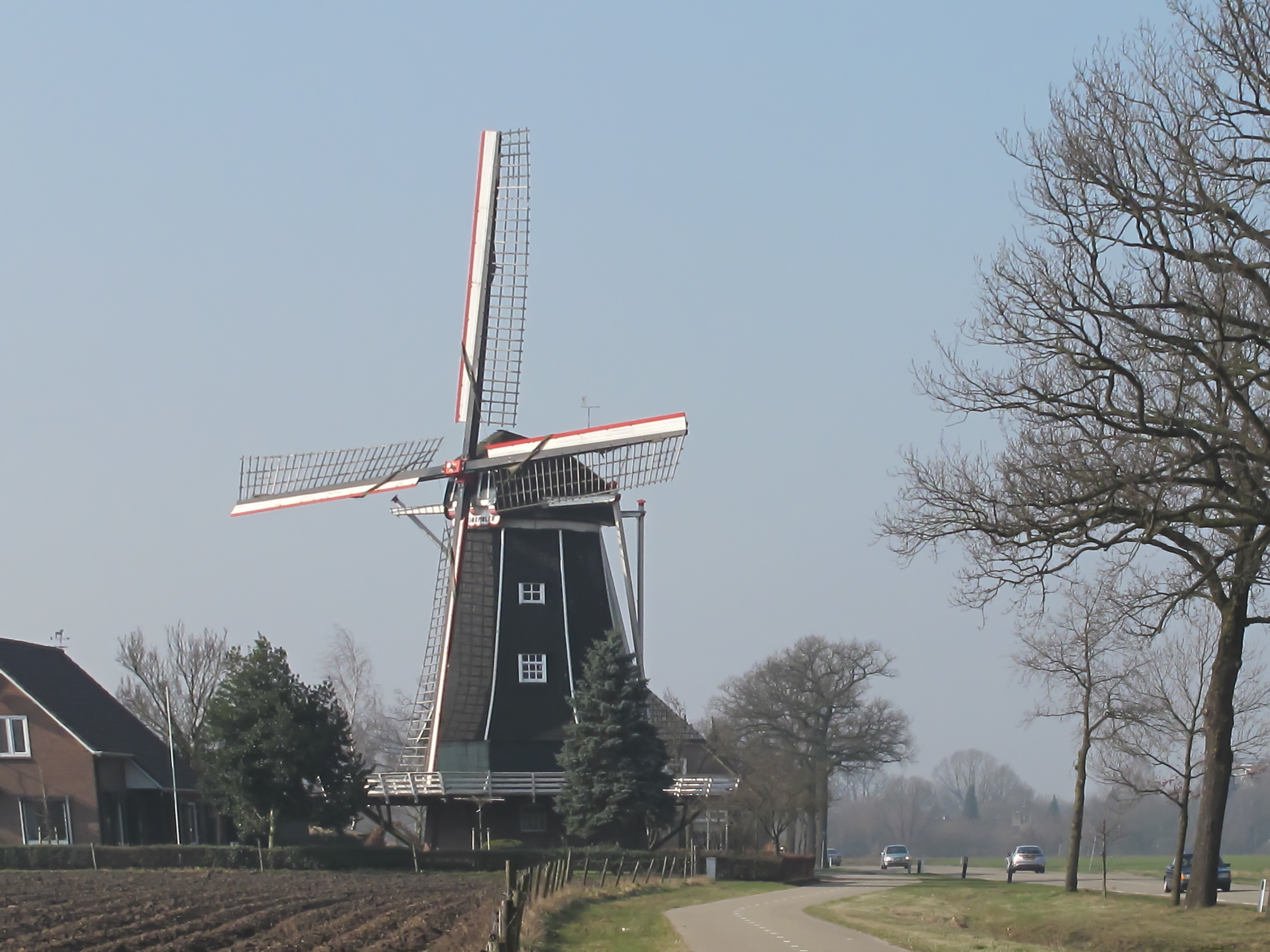
- The mill in March 2011

Origin
- Mill name: Benninkmolen; Velsmolen
- Mill location: Varsseveldseweg 252, 7004 HK, Doetinchem
- Coordinates: 51°58′00″N 6°19′33″E
- Operator(s): Municipality of Doetinchem
- Year built: 1921

Information
- Purpose: Corn mill
- Type: Smock mill
- Storeys: Two storey smock
- Base storeys: One storey base
- Smock sides: Eight sides
- No. of sails: Four sails
- Type of sails: Common sails
- Windshaft: cast iron
- Winding: Tailpole and winch
- No. of pairs of millstones: Two pairs
- Size of millstones: 1.40 metres (4 ft 7 in) diameter

Benninkmolen is a smock mill in Doetinchem, Gelderland, Netherlands which was built in 1921 and has been restored to working order. The mill is listed as a Rijksmonument.

== History ==
In 1856, a tower mill was built for B Vels. It was named the Velsmolen. The mill was demolished in 1920 due to its poor condition. The mill was replaced by a smock mill, which used the smock of the Buursinkmolen, Zelhem, Gelderland and machinery from various mills. It had a pair of Patent sails and a pair of Common sails. On 10 August 1925, the mill was severely damaged in a storm. Most of the shutters of the Patent sails were lost, with some of them being found 2 kilometres (1.2 mi) away. The mill was not repaired, and was used by the local fire brigade for training exercises.

In 1976, the mill was sold to the Gemeente Doetinchem. The mill was restored in 1980. Its name was changed from Velsmolen to Benninkmolen, after its first owner, J F Bennink. On restoration, the Patent sails were replaced by Common sails. Benninkmolen is listed as a Rijksmonument, No. 13087.

== Description ==
Benninkmolen is what the Dutch call a "Stellingmolen". It is a two storey smock mill on a single store base. There is a stage, which is 3.00 metres (9 ft 10 in) above ground level. The smock and cap are covered in shingles. Winding is by tailpole and winch. The sails are Common sails. They have a span of 23.10 metres (75 ft 9 in). They are carried on a cast iron windshaft. The windshaft also carries the brake wheel, which has 51 cogs. This drives a wallower with 28 cogs, which is situated at the top of the upright shaft. At the bottom of the upright shaft is the great spur wheel, which has 80 cogs. This drives two pairs of 1.40 metres (4 ft 7 in) diameter French Burr millstones via lantern pinion stone nuts with 24 staves each.

== Public access ==
Benninkmolen is open on Tuesday and Saturday from 09:00 to 12:00 and Friday from 11:00 to 16:00. It is also open at other times if a banner is flying, or by appointment.
