= Wehl =

- Town
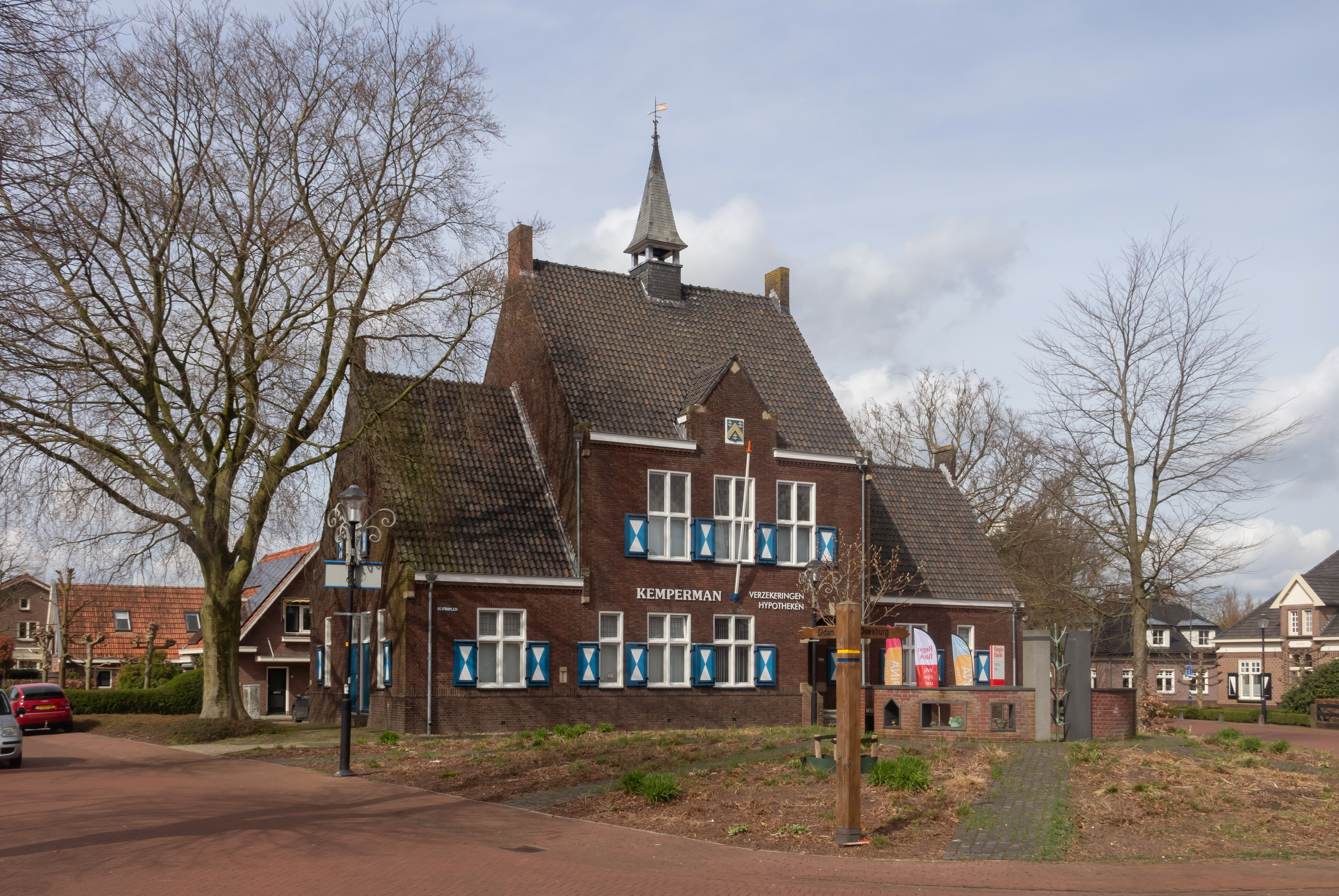
- Wehl, former townhall

- Flag Coat of arms

- Location in the province of Gelderland Wehl (Netherlands)
- Coordinates: 51°57′38″N 6°12′38″E
- Country: Netherlands
- Province: Gelderland
- Municipality: Doetinchem

Area
  - Total: 23.63 km^{2} (9.12 sq mi)
- Elevation: 14 m (46 ft)

Population (2021)
  - Total: 7,035
  - Density: 297.7/km^{2} (771.1/sq mi)
- Time zone: UTC+1 (CET)
  - Summer (DST): UTC+2 (CEST)
- Postal code: 7031
- Dialing code: 0314

Wehl is a town in the eastern Netherlands, about 5 km west of Doetinchem.

Wehl was a part of Prussia until 1808, when it was joined to the Netherlands. In those years it was officially a part of Zeddam. Wehl became an independent municipality in 1813, when it was given back to Prussia; in 1816, it returned to the Netherlands. It remained an independent municipality until the municipal reorganization on 1 January 2005, when Wehl became part of the larger neighbouring municipality of Doetinchem.

The former municipality also included the village of Nieuw-Wehl, 3 km to the west.

== History ==
It was first mentioned around 1200 as Wele. The etymology is unknown. The village developed between the Rhine and the Oude IJssel. In 1466, it became an independent parish. In 1647, it became an enclave of the Duchy of Cleves and no longer part of the Dutch Republic.

The Catholic St. Martinus Church dates from 15th century, and has a tower from the 13th century with 12th century elements. Between 1894 and 1895, it was redesigned into its current form. In 1816, it became part of the Netherlands. In 1840, it was home to 408 people. After World War II, Wehl started to expand rapidly. In 1885, the Wehl railway station opened on the Winterswijk-Zevenaar railway line. The station is still there, but the building was demolished in 2010. In 2005, it merged into Doetinchem.

== Notable people ==
- Chris Mijnarends (born 1939), field hockey player who competed at the 1964 Summer Olympics
- Tim Sanders (born 1986), footballer

== Gallery ==
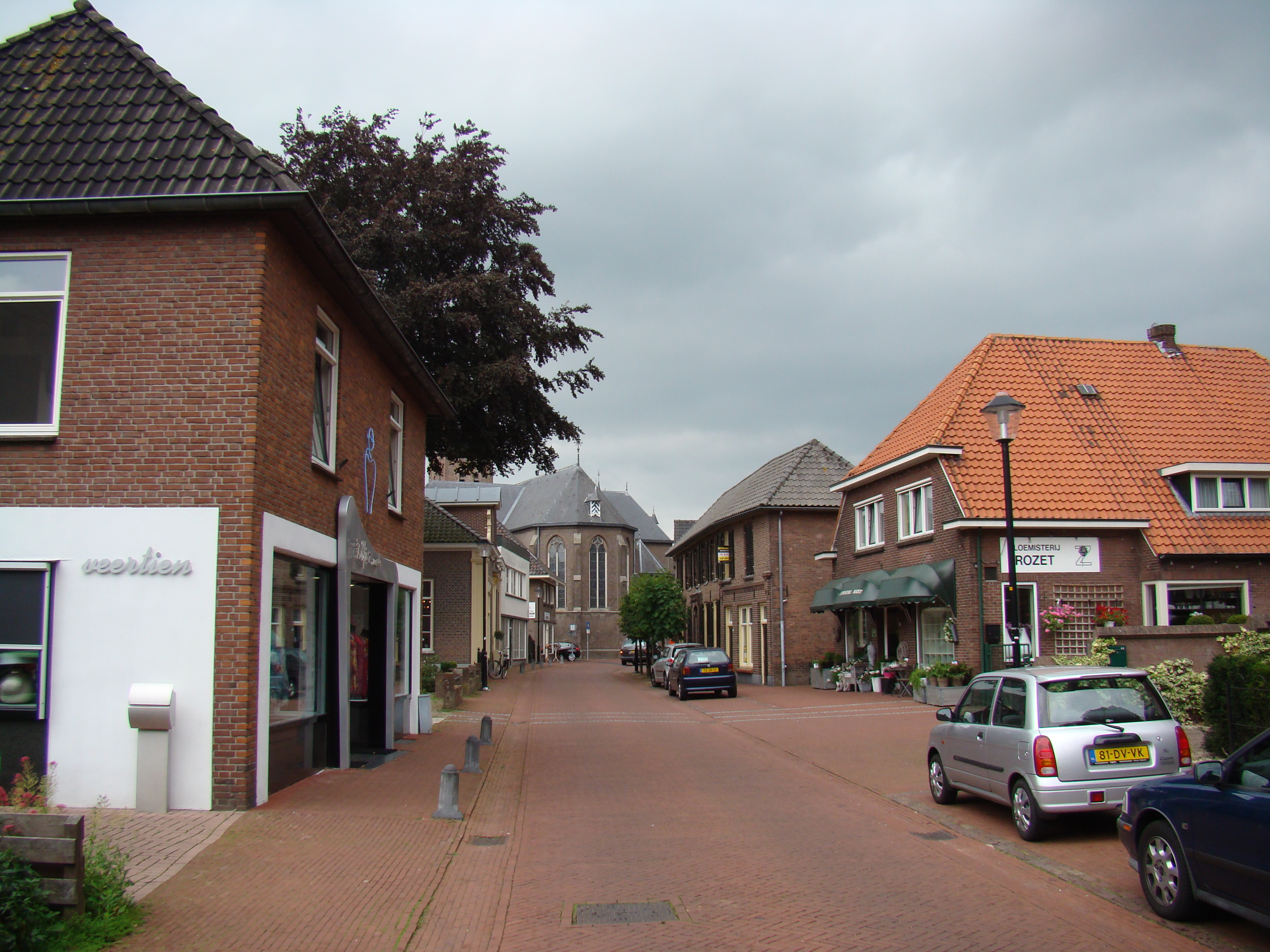
Street view

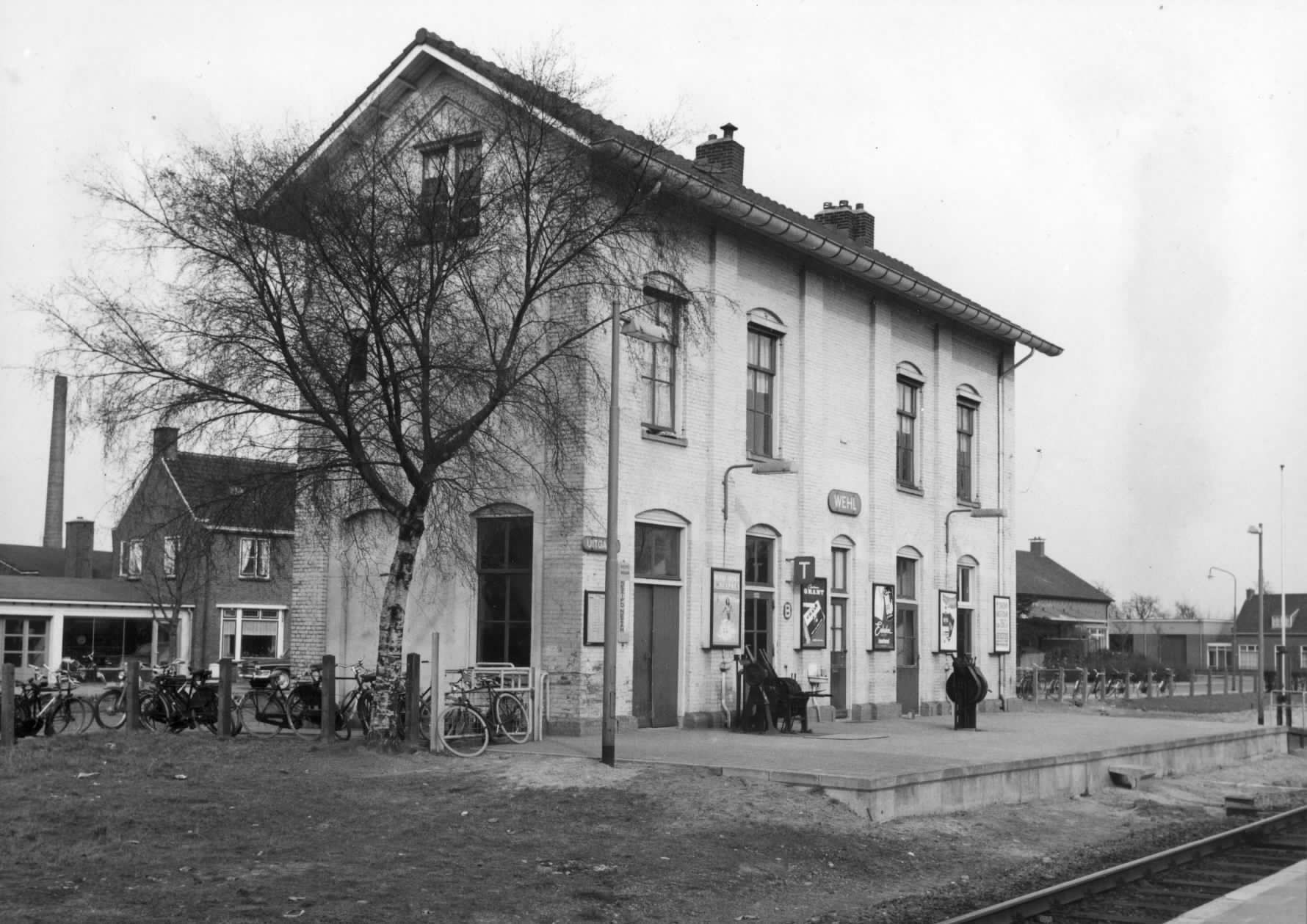
Former railway station building

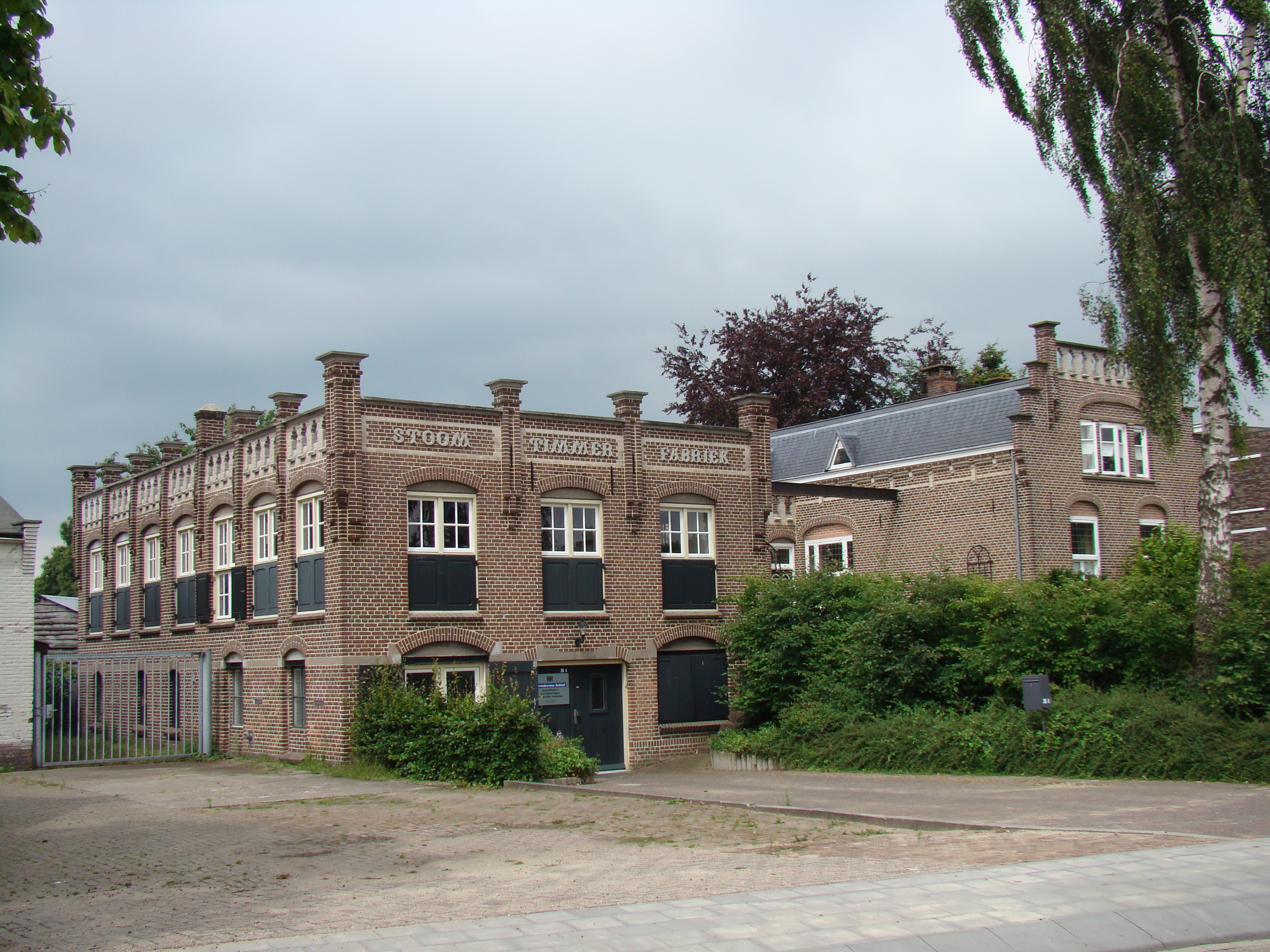
Factory in Wehl

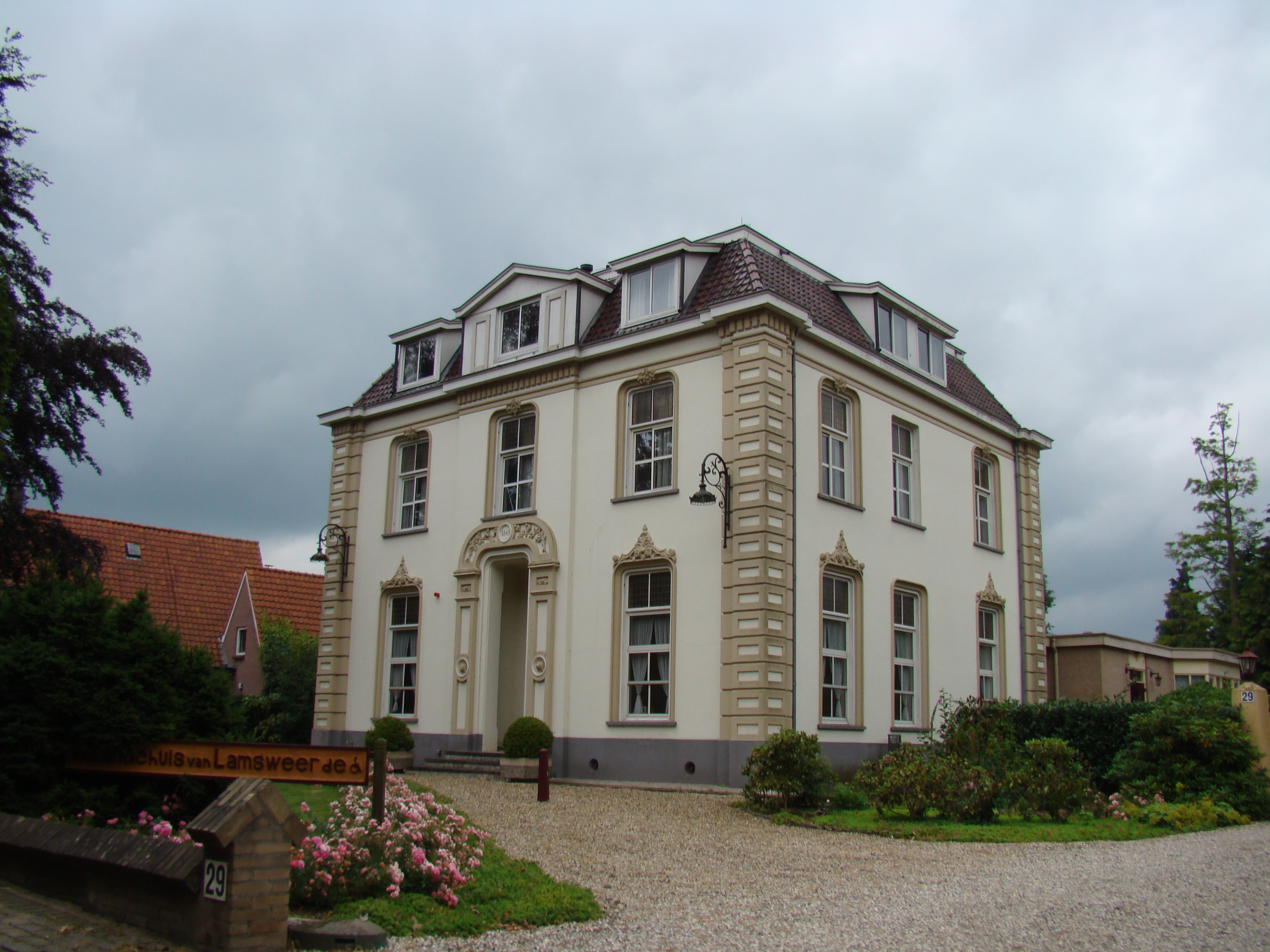
Villa "Huis van Lamsweerde"
