= Koen Huntelaar =

Dutch footballer

Personal information
- Full name: Koen Florin Huntelaar
- Date of birth: 8 July 1998 (age 28)
- Place of birth: Hummelo, Netherlands
- Height: 1.85 m (6 ft 1 in)
- Position: Midfielder

Youth career
- Hessen Combinatie '03
- –2016: De Graafschap

Senior career*
Years	Team	Apps	(Gls)
2016	De Graafschap	1	(0)
2016–2019	Jong De Graafschap	54	(1)
2019–2020	DUNO		
2021–2023	Bennekom		
- * Club domestic league appearances and goals as of 10 June 2019

Koen Huntelaar (born 8 July 1998) is a Dutch retired footballer who played as a midfielder. He is a nephew of former Dutch international player Klaas-Jan Huntelaar.

== Club career ==
Huntelaar made his professional debut in the Eerste Divisie for De Graafschap on 22 August 2016 in a game against SC Cambuur. After not making the grade in professional football, Huntelaar joined amateur side DUNO in 2019, but moved to Bennekom during the COVID-19 season. In May 2022 he tore his anterior cruciate ligament which would keep him out for almost a year.

== Personal life ==
He is a nephew of Klaas-Jan Huntelaar and his father Cor was a financial director at De Graafschap.
