= Normaal =

Dutch rock band

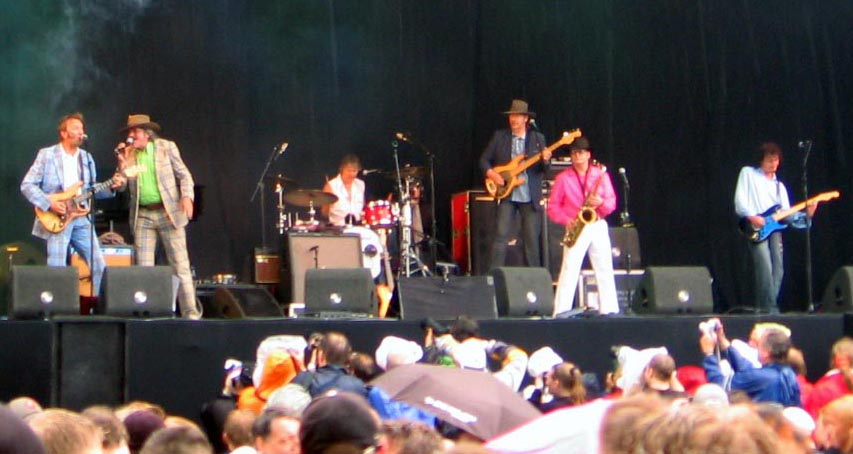
- Normaal performing in 2006

Background information
- Origin: Hummelo, Achterhoek, Gelderland, Netherlands
- Genres: Rock; hard rock; country rock
- Years active: 1974–2015; 2019–present
- Members: Bennie Jolink; Ferdi Joly; Willem Terhorst; Timo Kelder
- Past members: Jan Manschot; Willem van Dijk; Jan Kolkman; Alan Gascoigne; Paul Kemper; Fokke de Jong
- Website: normaal.nl

Normaal (Dutch pronunciation: [nɔrˈmaːl]) is a Dutch rock band from the Achterhoek region, who sang in Achterhooks, a local variety of the Low Saxon. Bennie Jolink, who was an arts student at an arts academy, stationed in Amsterdam in the 1970s, started the band in 1975 as a reaction to disco and glamrock, in addition to the overall "Dutch snobbery" towards people from the Low Saxon-speaking regions, and use of the English language by many other Dutch artists. "Normaal" meaning "normal", suggesting the same: "act normally". The band has since gained national fame, and have had more top 40 hits in the Dutch chart than any other Dutch band. Despite this fact, the band never reached number one. The music could be typified as "heavy country rock", and possibly as a rowdier version of ZZ Top or Status Quo.

In 2019, they reached number 9 in the annual Top 2000 hit list with "De boer dat is de keerl" (translates to "The Farmer, that is the man") due to a viral social media campaign to vote for it as a means of protest against increased hardship for farmers in the country caused by the tightening of nitrogen-emission laws. Aired during the last week of the year and often called the "Chart of charts", the Top 2000 countdown of the most popular songs of all time draws millions of listeners in the Netherlands alone. Usually, however, the highest-ranked Normaal song is, "Oerend hard", ranging from a chart position of 82 in 2005 to 371 in 2023; it has appeared on the Top 2000 list every year since this was inaugurated in 1999.

== History ==
The band was founded in 1974 by guitarist and lead vocalist Bennie Jolink and drummer Jan Manschot.

The band had a very loyal following of 'anhangers' (fans) or 'høkers', some of whom followed the band's tours anywhere they went. Normaal's concerts were usually performed in large party tents in the countryside. In the early days, the concerts were mainly focused on consuming large quantities of alcohol, and partying (for which they have come up with the umbrella term 'høken') rather than sound quality, although this has changed over the decades. The term 'høken' is an example of words that the band invented or popularized, and fit their local dialect. Høken is used as word in several of the band's lyrics, song titles and album/DVD titles. It has become an established term especially in the Achterhoek region, and can even be found in the Van Dale Dutch dictionary with attribution to the band.

Their first and biggest hit was "Oerend Hard" ('Bloody Fast'), a song about two motor cyclists who "never heard of slow driving". The song ends with them crashing, whereafter it is implied that both drivers have died in the crash, after which the band (and its fans) sings that despite this fact, they will continue to drive "oerend hard". Several members of the band have been involved in serious motor accidents.

In September 2006, Normaal released Hier is Normaal ("Here is Normaal"), followed by two concert tours. Not only their album, but both concert tours of that year were carbon neutral. The energy needed for all 44 concerts was compensated via investments in renewable energy projects in India. Normaal is the first Dutch band to have taken a stance against global climate change.

In October 2007, organizers of two hugely successful concerts by Normaal enabled the band to donate $11,000 to Woodstock General Hospital Foundation. The idea came from a dairy farmer; Ben Van Haastert from Woodstock, Ontario. Haastert's wife Ankie and local friends assisted in planning. One concert was held in nearby London, Ontario (a neighbouring city with a larger population), and the other was held in Woodstock.

Founding member Jan Manschot died in January 2014.

Normaal played their last shows in 2015. Bennie Jolink continued as a member of De Pensionado's with whom he recorded a studio-album. He retired from performing in 2016, although he did some incidental performances afterwards.

In 2018, the surviving original members and Manschot's widow unveiled a statue in Hummelo, based on one of their early pictures.

In 2019, Normaal played two reunion-concerts.

== Band members ==
Current members

- Bennie Jolink - lead vocals, guitars, percussion (1974-2015, 2019-present)
- Ferdi Joly - vocals, guitars, saxophone, clarinet, harmonica (1974-1980, 2003-2015, 2019-present)
- Willem Terhorst - bass, vocals (1975-2015, 2019-present)
- Timo Kelder - drums, vocals (2013-2015, 2019-present)

Current touring members

- Roel Spanjers - keyboards, accordion, piano, vocals (2003-2015, 2019-present)
- Jan Wilm Tolkamp - guitars, vocals (2006-2015, 2019-present)
- Joppe Bestevaar - saxophone (2024-present)

Former members

- Jan Manschot - drums, percussion, vocals (1974-1989, 2003-2005; occasional guest appearances 1989-2013; died 2014)
- Willem van Dijk – bass, vocals (1974-1975)
- Jan Kolkman - guitar, vocals, accordion, saxophone (1975, 1994-2003)
- Alan Gascoigne - guitar (1980-1983, 2000-2005)
- Paul Kemper - guitar, backing vocals (1983-2000)
- Fokke de Jong - drums, vocals (1989-2003, 2005-2013)

Former touring members

- Jan de Ligt - saxophone (2003-2015, 2019-2024; his death)
- Tessa Boomkamp - drums, vocals (2003-2005)
- Arend Bouwmeester - saxophone (2003)
- Andre Houtappels - guitar (2005-2006)
- Joost Hagen - trumpet (2007-2009)

Substitutes

- Nico Groen - drums (1985)
- Willem Duyn - lead vocals (1992)
- Robert Colenbrander - guitar, backing vocals (1992)
- Hendrik-Jan Lovink - lead vocals, guitar (2002)

== Discography ==
=== Studio albums ===
- Oerend Hard (1977)
- Ojadasawa (1978)
- D'n Achterhoek Tsjoek (1979)
- Høken Is Normaal (1980)
- Deurdonderen (1982)
- De Boer Is Troef (1983)
- De Klok Op Rock (1984)
- Steen Stoal En Sentiment (1985)
- Zo Kommen Wi-j De Winter Deur (1985)
- Kiek Uut (1986)
- Noar 'T Café (1987)
- Da's Normaal (1988)
- Rechttoe Rechtan (1989)
- H.A.L.V.U. (1991)
- Buugen Of Barsten (1992)
- Gas D'r Bi-j (1994)
- Top of the Bult (1996)
- Krachttoer (1997)
- Høken, Kreng (1998)
- Effe Zitten (2000)
- Van Tied Tut Tied (2000)
- Ik Kom Altied Weer Terug (2001)
- Høk & Swing (2003)
- Fonkel (2004)
- Hier Is Normaal (2006)
- Ni-je NRS (2008)
- De Blues eLPee (2009)
- Halve Soul, Helemoal Høken (2012)
- 40 Joar Høken (2015)
- Normale Verhale (2021)
- Nøhlen (2024)

=== Live albums ===
- Springleavend (1981)
- Normalis Jubilaris (1990)
- Bi-j Normaal Thuus (1993)
- Kriebel In De Konte (1998)
- Vernemstig Te Passe (2003)
- Live - De VPRO sessies (2009)
- Høken In Hummelo - 35 Joar Normaal (2011)
- De Wilde Joaren (2013)
- Ajuu De Mazzel! (2016)

=== Compilations ===
- Stark Wark 1980-1983 (1983)
- 12½ Jaar (1988)
- Het Beste Van Normaal (1992)
- Hits Van Normaal (1994)
- Deur De Joaren Hen (1997)
- Onwijs Høken 20 Jaar Hits (1997)
- 100 x Normaal (2007)
