= Chris Mijnarends =

Dutch field hockey player

Personal information
- Nationality: Dutch
- Born: 8 August 1939 (age 86) Wehl, Netherlands

Sport
- Sport: Field hockey

Chris Mijnarends (born 8 August 1939) is a Dutch field hockey player. He competed in the men's tournament at the 1964 Summer Olympics.
