= Overstegen =

- District of Doetinchem
- Interactive map of Overstegen
- Country: Netherlands
- Province: Gelderland
- COROP: Achterhoek
- City: Doetinchem
- Time zone: UTC+1 (CET)
- Postal code: 7002

Overstegen is a district in the north-east of Doetinchem, the biggest city within the Gelderse Achterhoek. Typical for this district is the many apartment buildings found by the Caenstraat and around the mall. Apart from a mall, a care facility, Het Trommelslag, is found within. The district was built in the 1960s and 1970s.

During construction of the district, several flint arrowheads were found, as well as remains of wires. Other archaeological finds are a bronze pouch (early or late Bronze Age, found near de Wrange) and a bronze axehead (late Bronze Age, found at the banks of the Oude IJssel).

In the district you will find several services such as shops and schools. Travelling within the distric can be done with public transport.
