= Hummelo en Keppel =

- Former municipality
- Flag Coat of arms

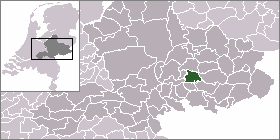
- Coordinates: 52°00′00″N 6°14′00″E
- Country: Netherlands
- Province: Gelderland
- Established: 1818

Area
  - Total: 43.16 km^{2} (16.66 sq mi)

Population
  - Total: 4,528
- Time zone: UTC+1 (CET)
  - Summer (DST): UTC+2 (CEST)
- Dissolved: 2005
- Today part of: Bronckhorst

Hummelo en Keppel is a former municipality in the Dutch province of Gelderland. It was created in 1818, when the municipalities of Hummelo and Keppel merged, and existed until 2005, when the area became a part of the new municipality of Bronckhorst.
