= Ambt Doetinchem =

- Former Municipality
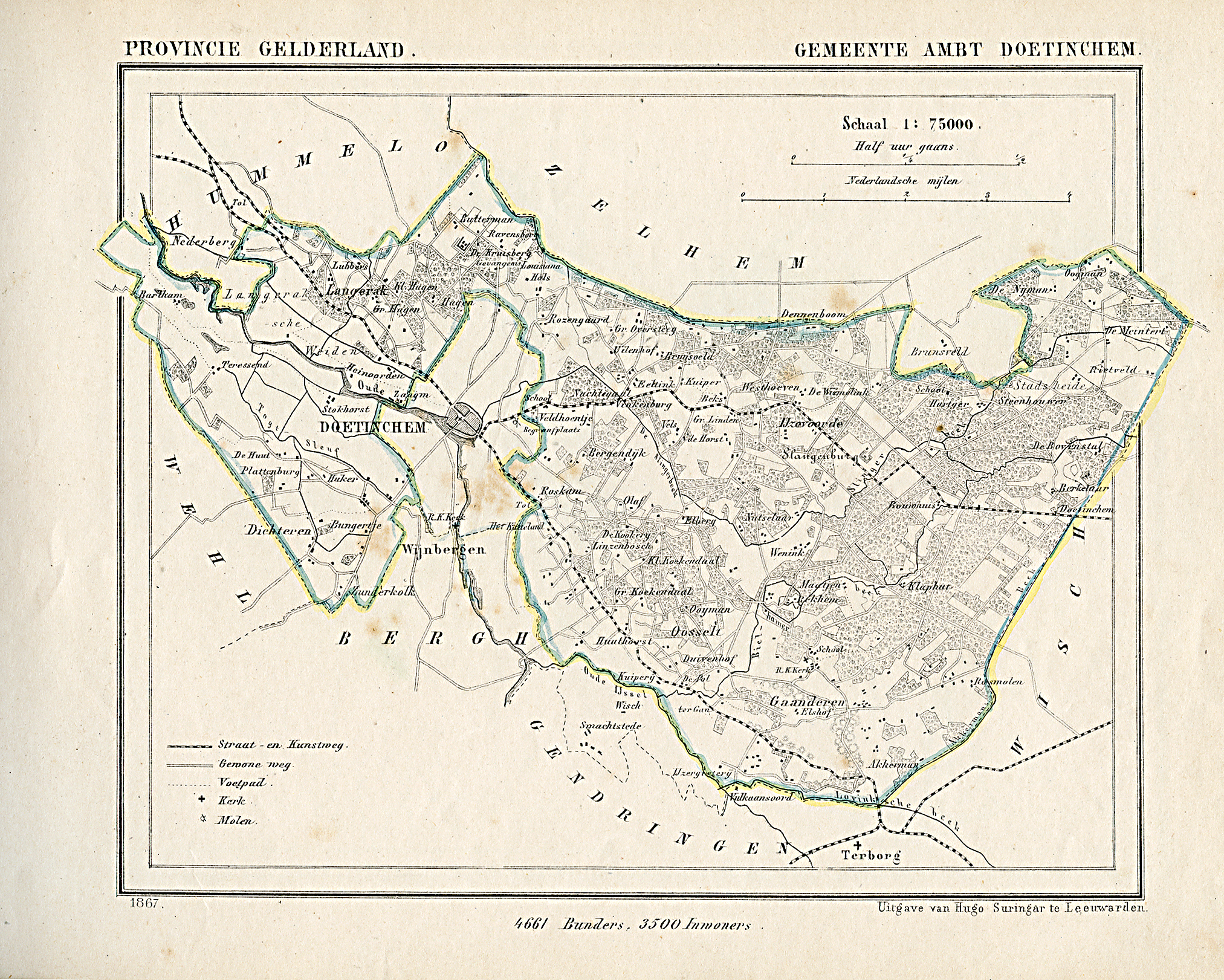
- Map of Ambt Doetinchem (1867)

- Location within Netherlands
- Coordinates: 51°57′57″N 6°18′07″E
- Country: Netherlands
- Province: Gelderland
- Established: 1818

Population (1890)
  - Total: 3,996
- Demonym: (Ambt) Doetinchemmer
- Time zone: UTC+1 (CET)
  - Summer (DST): UTC+2 (CEST)
- This municipality has merged with Doetinchem on January 1st, 1920.

Ambt Doetinchem is a former municipality in the Dutch province of Gelderland. It consisted of the countryside surrounding the city of Doetinchem, which belonged to the separate municipality of Stad Doetinchem.

Ambt Doetinchem was a separate municipality between 1818 and 1920, when it merged with Stad Doetinchem.
