= Janouk Kelderman =

Dutch actress (born 1991)

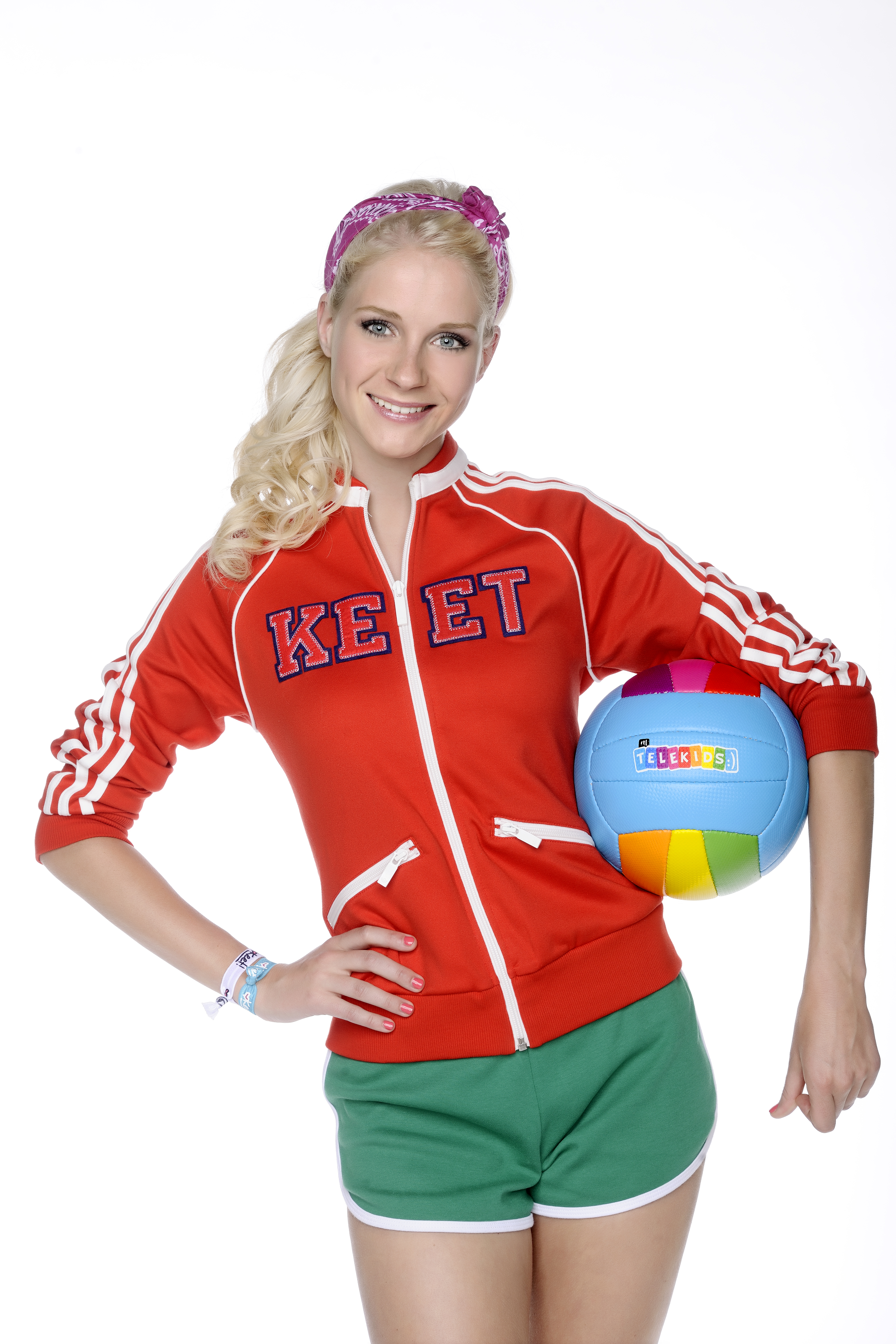
- Kelderman as Keet! in 2013
- Born: 7 May 1991 (age 34); Doetinchem, The Netherlands
- Occupations: Actress, singer, television presenter
- Years active: 2013–present
- Website: janoukkelderman.nl

Janouk Kelderman (born 7 May 1991 in Doetinchem) is a Dutch actress, singer and television presenter.

== Career ==
=== Television ===
While looking for an internship in 2013, Kelderman started working as Keet!, a presenter on RTL Telekids. She left the role in 2017, citing a desire to focus on other projects.

She started working as a presenter on NTR's Het klokhuis in 2017.

Following the cancellation of the Eurovision Song Contest 2020 due to the COVID-19 pandemic, Kelderman was selected as the host of Eurovision Song Celebration 2020 on the contest's YouTube channel, as a replacement for the semi-finals featuring all 41 songs in a non-competitive format.

=== Film ===
Kelderman's début in a feature-length film came in 2015, when she starred as Keet in Keet & Koen en de Speurtocht naar Bassie & Adriaan.

== Filmography ==
=== Television ===
==== as Keet! (2013–2017) ====
Year	Channel	Title	Role
2013–2015	RTL 8 / RTL Telekids	De nationale opblijfavond	Presenter (with Patrick Martens)
2013–2014	RTL 8 / RTL Telekids	Post voor sint	Presenter
2014	RTL 8 / RTL Telekids	Wie o wie zingt Do-Re-Mi?	Presenter (with Vajèn van den Bosch)
2015–2016	RTL 8 / RTL Telekids	Theaterkids	Presenter
2016	RTL 8 / RTL Telekids	HiHa Holland	Presenter

==== as Janouk Kelderman (2017–present) ====
Year	Channel	Title	Role
2017–present	NTR	Het klokhuis	Presenter
2017	NPO Zapp	Zapp Skills	Presenter
2018	Nickelodeon	I Am Frankie	Frankie (Dutch voice)
2019	NTR	Dokter Corrie: Zomerliefde	Self (in the episode "We zoenden overal")
2020	YouTube	Eurovision Song Celebration 2020	Presenter

=== Film ===
Year	Tltle	Role
2015	Keet & Koen en de Speurtocht naar Bassie & Adriaan	Keet

== Discography ==
=== as Keet! (2013–2017) ===
Title	Year	Remarks
Kus van Keet!	2013	–
Waarom kan het niet altijd kerstmis zijn?	2013	–
Als je danst met Keet!	2014	–
Grijp je kans	2014	–
Dit ben ik	2015	–
Cha cha slide	2015	–
Altijd samen	2015	Title song from Keet & Koen en de Speurtocht naar Bassie & Adriaan
