= Jaap Kelderman =

Dutch footballer

Personal information
- Full name: Jacob Dirk Kelderman
- Date of birth: 2 January 1928
- Place of birth: Broek in Waterland, Netherlands
- Date of death: 4 February 1976 (aged 48)
- Place of death: Rome, Italy
- Position: Goalkeeper

Youth career
- SDOB

Senior career*
Years	Team	Apps	(Gls)
194?–1948	SDOB		
1948–1949	Ajax	3	(0)
- VV Monnickendam
- * Club domestic league appearances and goals

Jacob Dirk "Jaap" Kelderman (2 January 1928 – 4 February 1976) was a Dutch association football player, who played as a goalkeeper for Ajax.

== Club career ==
Kelderman played in the youth of SDOB from the town of Broek in Waterland, and was later picked up by Dutch giants, Ajax. On 12 September 1948, Jaap made his first team debut for Ajax in a Netherlands Championship match against Xerxes. At the end of the season he played in two matches – against Sparta and ADO.

In September 1949 Kelderman with Rinus Michels got into a car accident in France.
