= Doetinchem =

Doetinchem Deutekem (Achterhoeks)
- Municipality
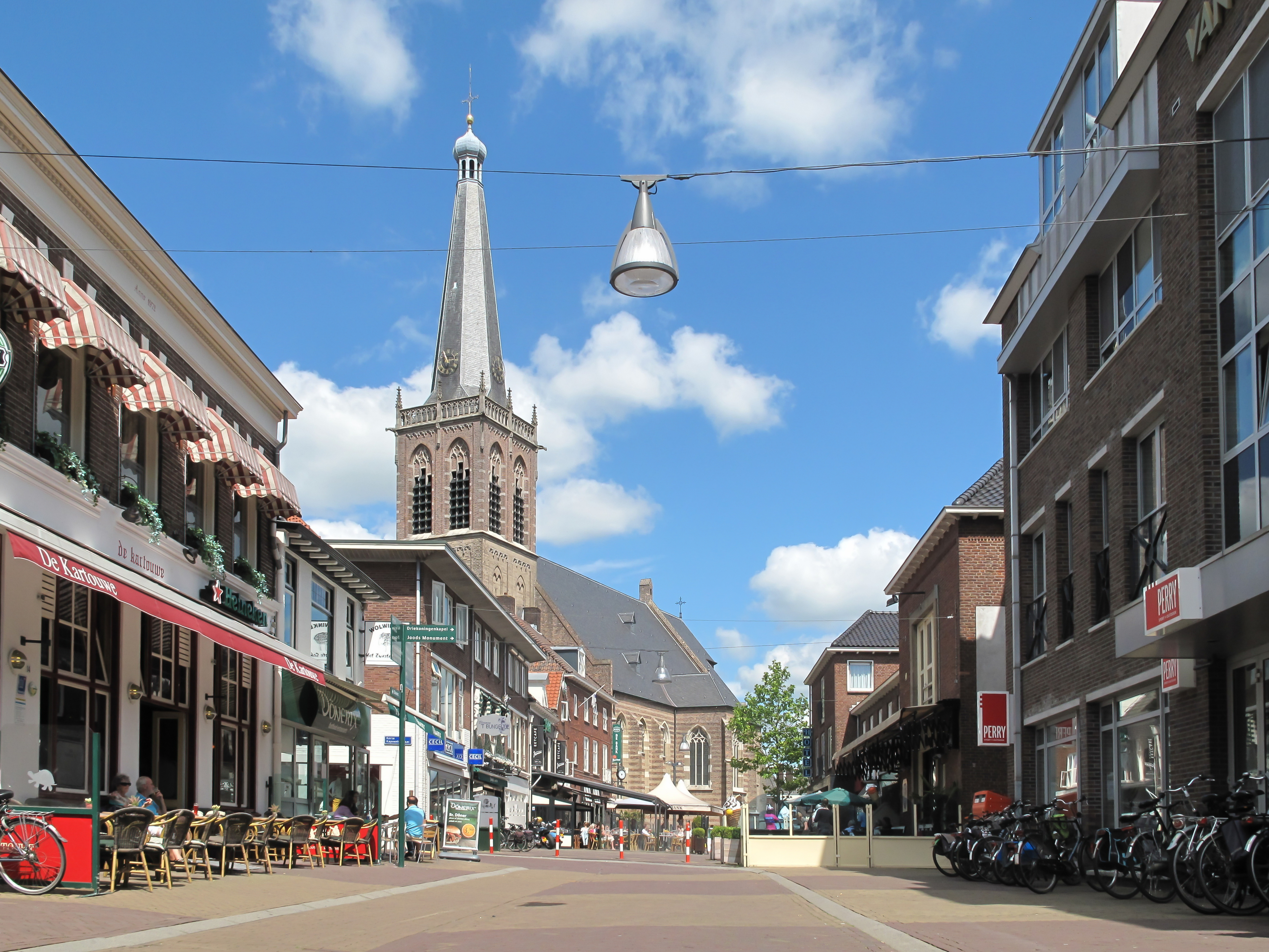
- Church in Doetinchem

- Flag Coat of arms

- Location in Gelderland

- Location within the Netherlands Location within Europe
- Coordinates: 51°58′N 6°18′E
- Country: Netherlands
- Province: Gelderland

Government
  - Body: Municipal council
  - Mayor: Mark Boumans (VVD)

Area
  - Total: 79.66 km^{2} (30.76 sq mi)
  - Land: 79.05 km^{2} (30.52 sq mi)
  - Water: 0.61 km^{2} (0.24 sq mi)
- Elevation: 14 m (46 ft)

Population (January 2021)
  - Total: 58,270
  - Density: 737/km^{2} (1,910/sq mi)
- Demonym: Doetinchemmer
- Time zone: UTC+1 (CET)
  - Summer (DST): UTC+2 (CEST)
- Postcode: 7000–7011, 7030–7031
- Area code: 0314, 0315
- Website: www.doetinchem.nl

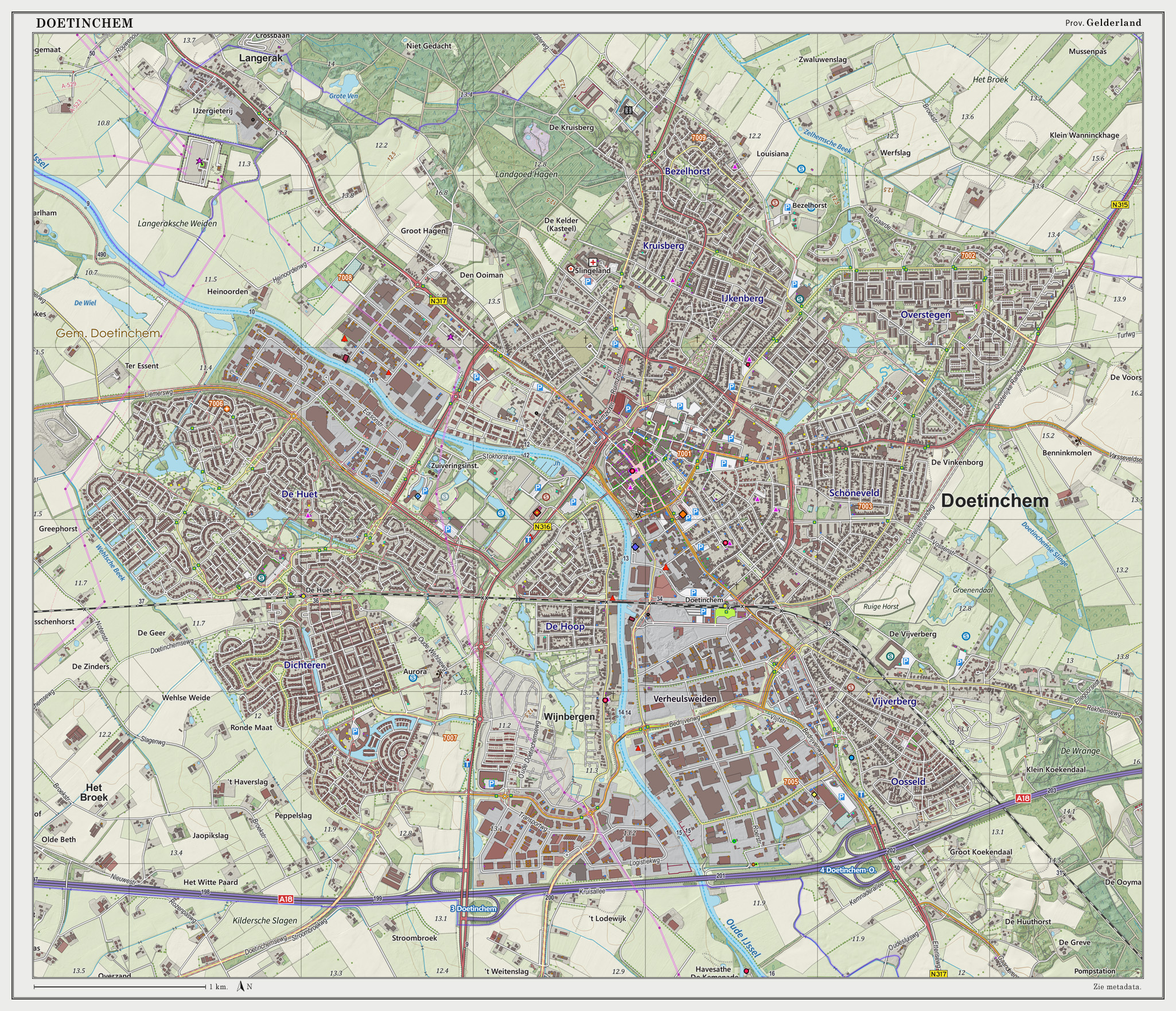
Dutch Topographic map of Doetinchem, March 2014

Doetinchem (Dutch pronunciation: [ˈdutɪŋxəm]; Low Saxon: Deutekem) is a city and municipality in the east of the Netherlands. It is situated along the Oude IJssel (Old IJssel) river in a part of the province of Gelderland called the Achterhoek. The municipality had a population of 58,270 in 2021 and consists of an area of 79.66 km^{2} (30.76 sq mi) of which 0.61 km^{2} (0.24 sq mi) is water. This makes Doetinchem the largest town (by population) in the Achterhoek.

On 1 January 2005, a municipal restructuring merged the neighbouring municipality of Wehl as well as the Zelhelmse Broek area with Doetinchem.

== Population centres ==
The local government organization in the Netherlands is complex and fine-grained (see municipality and Govt Stats, with municipalities being divided into various entities. The municipality of Doetinchem consists of:

The city ('stad'):

- Doetinchem

The neighborhoods ('wijken'):

- Centrum
- Bezelhorst
- Dichteren
- Overstegen
- De Huet
- De Hoop
- Oosseld
- Schöneveld & Muziekbuurt

The townships ('buurtschappen'):

- Gaanderen
- Wehl
- IJzevoorde
- Langerak
- Wijnbergen (Doetinchem)
- Nieuw-Wehl

Wehl was a separate municipality (with about 6,750 inhabitants, including Nieuw-Wehl) until 31 December 2004, when it merged with the municipality of Doetinchem.

== Demographics ==
doetinchem residents by ethnic background (2021)

| Country | 2021 |
|---|---|
| Netherlands | 92.3% |
| Turkey | 2.7% |
| Indonesia | 1.6% |
| Africa | 0.8% |
| Other non-western | 2.6% |

== History ==
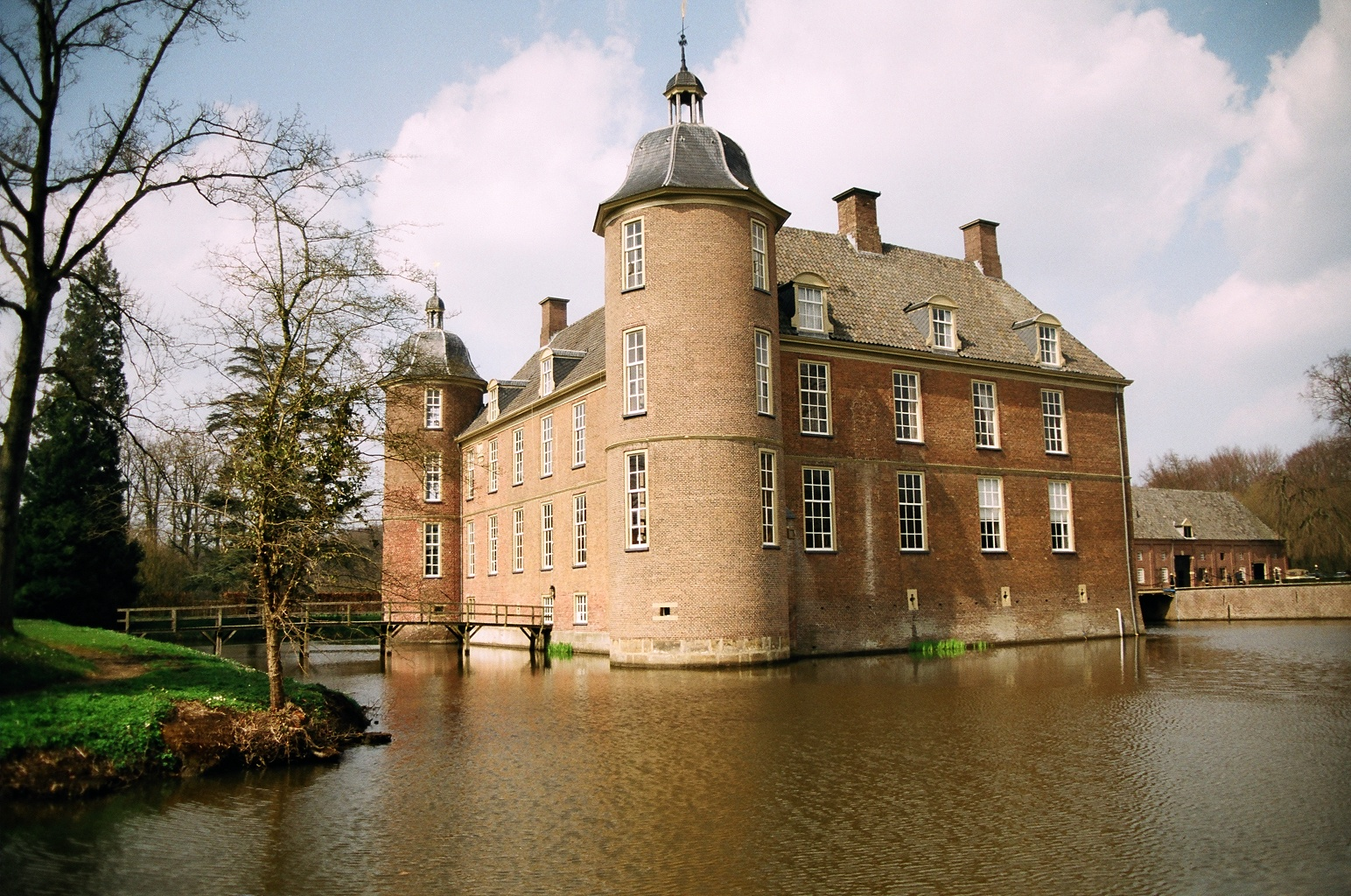
Slangenburg Castle

It is known from archaeological finds of skulls, pottery shards, and flint arrowheads that the area was inhabited more than 11,000 years ago. These prehistoric hunters were followed by Celtic and Germanic tribes like the Franks and Saxons. Roman coins have been found and there is also archaeological evidence of the Vikings having plundered the area.

The first reference to the name of Doetinchem comes in a document from the year 838 which mentions a 'villa Duetinghem', a settlement with a small church. In 887, there is another mention of 'Deutinkem', a fortress with a church which had been given to the then Bishop of Utrecht. The spelling has varied over the centuries, with 'Duttichem', 'Duichingen' and 'Deutekom' being just some examples.

For a long time, Doetinchem remained a small place but around 1100 it started to grow and, after suffering several attempts by plunderers, a town wall was built. In 1236, Doetinchem was granted city rights ('stadsrechten') by Count Otto II of Gelre and Zutphen, and in return, the town provided taxes and soldiers for the Count's army. Also, the new city council published rules for the city, codified in the 'Keurboek van Doetinchem' (Rulebook of Doetinchem), which laid down severe punishments for infringements.

In 1226, Doetinchem faced increasing danger from plunderers, and so the city wall was raised by a metre. There were four barriers in the wall which, being weak points, were replaced over time by four large city-gates known as the Hamburgerpoort (built 1302), the Waterpoort, the Gruitpoort, and the Hezenpoort. Later a moat was dug around the wall and a rampart was built in front; the city's central windmill, the 'walmolen' (Dutch 'wal'=rampart, 'molen'=mill), stands on the remains of this rampart. Despite these defences, Doetinchem was besieged many times and during the Eighty Years' War (1568–1648). It was besieged and conquered twice. However, eventually the walls became seen as redundant (or perhaps ineffective) and in 1672, they were torn down. However, it was not until the second half of the 19th century that the city gates and most of the rampart were removed.

From its early years, Doetinchem had been an important marketplace for farmers to sell their wares; the market was held in the central square called the Simonsplein right up until the Second World War.

Doetinchem has had its fair share of disasters. Apart from the sieges mentioned above, in 1527 a large fire destroyed most of the city including the city archives (which means that many earlier dates in the history of Doetinchem are somewhat unreliable), and in 1580 most of the city was killed by a plague. There was also occasional flooding. However, despite the fact that Doetinchem is only 10 km (6.2 mi) from the German border, because the Netherlands was not involved in the First World War, Doetinchem saw nothing more than the posting of a few border guards during that time. Even during the Second World War, Doetinchem came off fairly lightly at first; there was only a small German occupying force and the city even escaped the worst effects of the Hunger Winter. However, some prisoners were executed after being implicated in the shooting death in Putten of an important German officer by the Dutch Resistance and disastrously, in March and April 1945, the centre of Doetinchem was largely destroyed by Allied bombing which was either intended for nearby German towns or, as some say, was to destroy the German defences in Doetinchem. Which of the two is true has never really been clarified and there is still some discussion about the true intentions of the bombardment. The city itself was liberated by The Calgary Highlanders in 1945 after a brief battle there.

In 2018 a writer called Karel Berkhuysen researched the Allied bombing. He found that the Germans were researching nuclear fission in a converted school. This information was then passed to the Allies.

In the decades after the war, Doetinchem grew and in a few years had outgrown its "competitors" in the Achterhoek, namely Doesburg, Winterswijk and Zutphen. The Dutch company, Philips, had a factory for some years in the city. From 2003 till 2005, the city grew enormously as new districts such as Dichteren were built, and as Doetinchem incorporates outlying villages such as Wehl into its municipality. In 2011, the city is still growing. By building a new district as het Loo and Isseldoks, and the opening of a brand new theatre and cinema, Doetinchem is the biggest growing city in Gelderland.

== Significant structures in Doetinchem ==
The main church in the central square, St Catherine's Church ('Catharinakerk') was virtually destroyed in the World War II bombing and restoration took from 1948 to 1963. Although originally a Roman Catholic church, it became Dutch Reformed in 1591. There are two castles, 'De Kelder' ('The Cellar') and Slangenburg.

The city has three windmills. In the city centre, there is the already mentioned De Walmolen, the bottom of which now houses the city's tourist office. In Dichteren, there is a mill called Aurora (Latin for 'dawn') and to the east of the city a mill called Benninkmolen. All these mills are open to visitors, usually open to all one weekday morning and at other times by appointment.

A few other important buildings in the city are the Amphion-Theater, the Gruitpoort, a big cultural centre, the Rietveld Lyceum, the biggest high school in Doetinchem and the Tax administration office.

== Sport ==
Doetinchem has a professional football team, De Graafschap ('The County'). The home of De Graafschap was completely revamped to transform it into an all-seater arena. The stands are fully covered, with the roof painted in the blue and white of the club.

The city has an indoor swimming pool, Rozengaarde. In April or May, a local evening four-day marathon is organized.

Since 2005 a four-day marathon is organised which starts and ends in Doetinchem and runs through the Achterhoek. The marathon was held from 23 August to the 26th. Almost 15.000 people took part.

In 2009 the city's volleyball team took part in the CEV cup playing against Halkbank Ankara from Turkey.

== Festivals ==
Doetinchem has an annual street-theatre festival Buitengewoon (Extraordinary), and the City Festival, a big festival with music acts, theatre, a carnival and fireworks.

== Notable residents ==
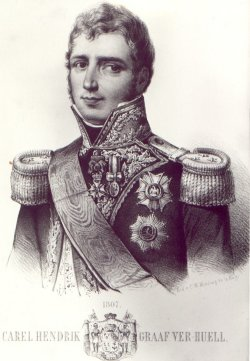
Carel Hendrik Ver Huell

- Frederik Johan van Baer, Lord of Slangenburg (1645–1713) a Dutch military officer
- Carel Hendrik Ver Huell (born 1764) a Dutch and later French admiral and statesman
- Geert Dales, Dutch Wiki (born 1952) a Dutch politician with 50PLUS
- Jan Rietman, Dutch Wiki (born 1952), a pianist and presenter on radio & TV
- Maria Martens (born 1955), politician, Member of the European Parliament (MEP) 1999 to 2009
- Thomas Rosenboom (born 1956) a Dutch author of novels and short stories
- Henriette de Swart (born 1961) a Dutch linguist and academic
- John Hondorp (born 1964) jazz organist and teaches the Hammond organ as an academic
- Wilke te Brummelstroete (born ca.1975) a Dutch mezzo-soprano
- Rianne Letschert (born 1976) a Dutch law scholar, Rector of Maastricht University
- Janouk Kelderman (born 1991) a Dutch actor, singer and television presenter

=== Sport ===
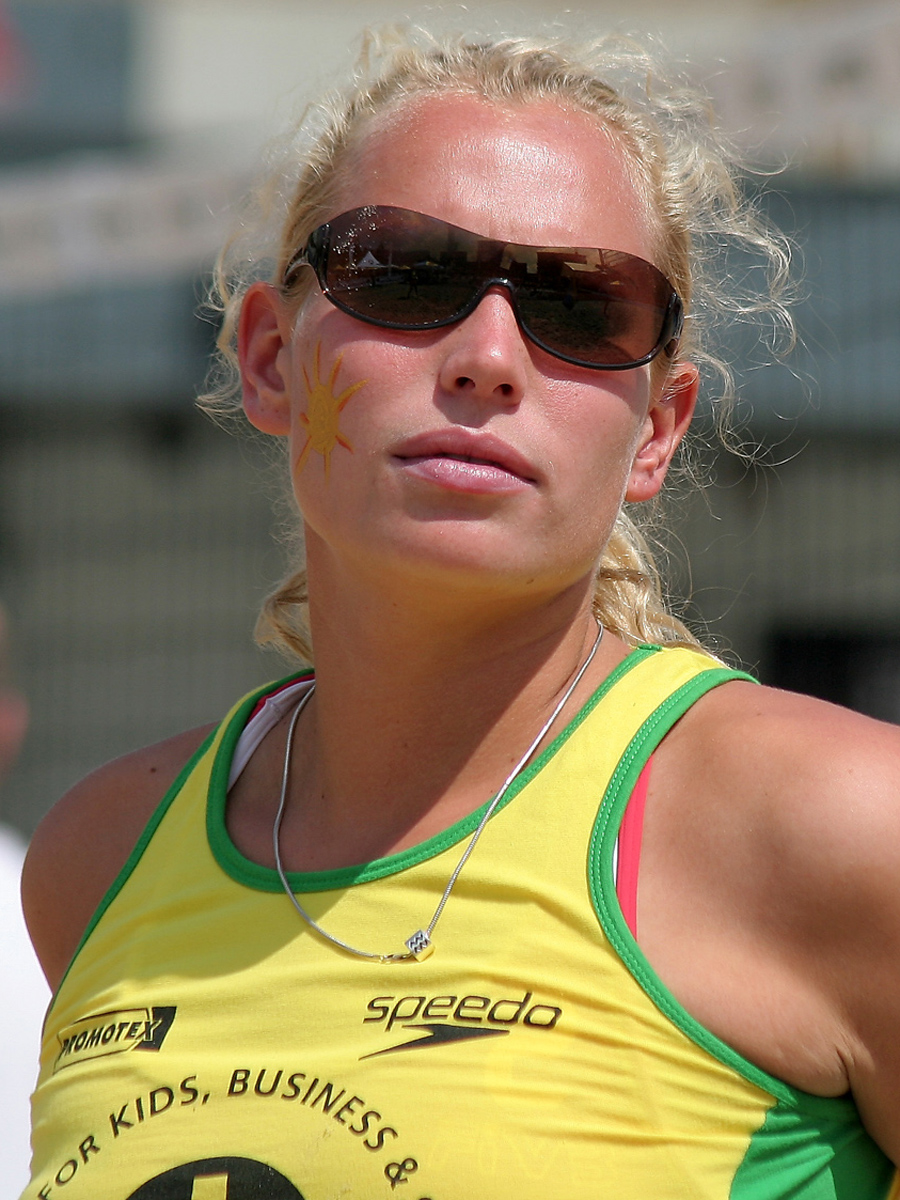
Sanne Keizer, 2007

- Desi Reijers (born 1964), freestyle swimmer, competed at the 1984 Summer Olympics
- Paul Bosvelt (born 1970), a Dutch former professional footballer with 523 club caps
- Chris Bruil (born 1970), badminton player, competed at the 2004 Summer Olympics
- Rogier Meijer (born 1981) a Dutch former footballer, 253 club caps with De Graafschap
- Glenn Loovens (born 1983), a Dutch professional footballer with nearly 400 club caps
- Sanne Keizer (born 1985), a Dutch beach volleyball player
- Marloes Wesselink (born 1987), a Dutch professional beach volleyball player
- Siem de Jong (born 1989), a Dutch professional footballer with 250 club caps
- Luuk de Jong (born 1990), a Dutch professional footballer with over 300 club caps
- Jelle van Gorkom (born 1991) a Dutch BMX racing cyclist, silver medalist at the 2016 Summer Olympics
- Richèl Hogenkamp (born 1992), a Dutch professional tennis player
- Siri Worm (born 1992), a Dutch women's football defender
- Alexander Büttner (born 1989), a Dutch professional footballer for De Graafschap

== Local media ==
Newspapers available in Doetinchem include subscription paper "De Gelderlander" and free papers "Doetinchems Vizier" and "Zondag", all published by Koninklijke Wegener NV. Doetinchem has its own television station called 'Stadstv' which is received by cable in the municipalities of Doetinchem itself and the neighbouring Hummelo en Keppel, and a television station called 'GraafschapTV' which is received in the entire Achterhoek region.

== Transport ==
=== Car traffic ===
Doetinchem is located along the A18 motorway, which has three exits near the city:

- 2: Wehl
- 3: Doetinchem
- 4: Doetinchem-East

The city center of Doetinchem features three parking garages and a large paid parking lot just outside the center, called De Varkensweide. Since July 1, 2006, the entire area around the city center has become a paid parking zone. On Tuesday, July 14, 2015, the Eastern Ring Road (Oostelijke Randweg) was opened, alleviating all traffic congestion in the city center. This road is now part of the N315.

=== Cycling ===
Several bike paths lead into the city, which is easily accessible for cyclists. The oldest bridge over the Oude IJssel was restored several decades ago and converted into a cycling bridge.

=== Public transport ===
- The Geldersche Tramweg-Maatschappij (GTM), based in Doetinchem, was founded on March 2, 1881, and opened its first tram line, Doetinchem – Dieren, on June 27, 1881. This line was later extended on both ends, forming the Velp – Dieren – Doetinchem – Terborg – Gendringen – Isselburg-Anholt route by 1903. Doetinchem was now connected to the outside world by steam tram. A tram station and maintenance workshop were built just outside the old city walls near the former Gruitpoort (also known as Grutpoort), which has since been demolished. In 1907, the tram line Zutphen – Emmerik opened. The last tram ran on August 31, 1957. The history of Gelderland's public transport is well-documented in the Openbaar Vervoer & Speelgoed Museum (Public Transport & Toy Museum) at Stationsstraat 50 in Doetinchem.
- Since late 2010, bus services in Doetinchem have been operated by Arriva, covering large parts of the city.
- Train services are provided by Arriva and Hermes (the latter under the name Breng). Doetinchem Station is located south of the city center. There is also a second station, Doetinchem De Huet, in the neighborhood of the same name. Until the 1980s, before De Huet Station was built, there was a station called Doetinchem West near the De Hoop neighborhood, toward Wijnbergen. This station was located next to the railway bridge over the Oude IJssel. The former station building now serves as an office.

== Twin towns – sister cities ==
Doetinchem is twinned with:

La Libertad, Nicaragua

Pardubice, Czech Republic

Raesfeld, Germany

=== La Libertad ===
Doetinchem has a sister city relationship with La Libertad in Nicaragua. To foster the bond between Doetinchem, La Libertad, and Nicaragua, the Doetinchem Ontwikkelings Samenwerking (DOS) was established in 1990. After a few years, the foundation chose to focus its efforts specifically on La Libertad. DOS aims to contribute to the development of projects that can improve living conditions in La Libertad. Additionally, it seeks to involve the residents of Doetinchem as much as possible in the life of La Libertad and the challenges faced there.

=== Pardubice ===
Doetinchem also has a sister city relationship with Pardubice in the Czech Republic. Through this partnership, both cities aim to foster greater interest in each other's way of life and culture. Additionally, efforts are made to contribute on a local level to improving relations between Eastern and Western European countries.

=== Raesfeld ===
The sister city relationship with Raesfeld is a continuation of the Wehl-Raesfeld partnership. This continuation was established following the merger of the municipalities of Wehl and Doetinchem in 2005.

== Gallery ==
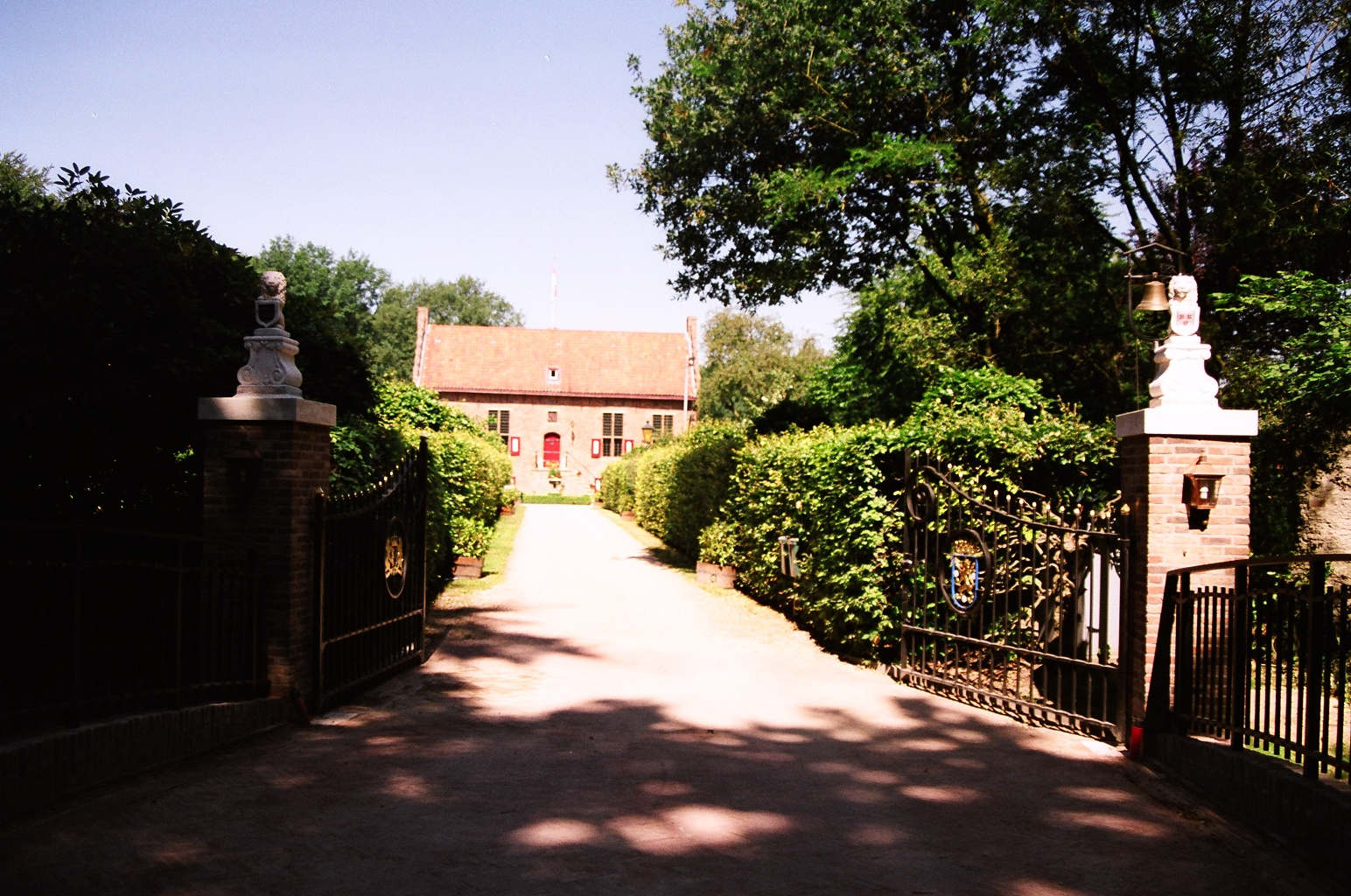
Doetinchem, castle

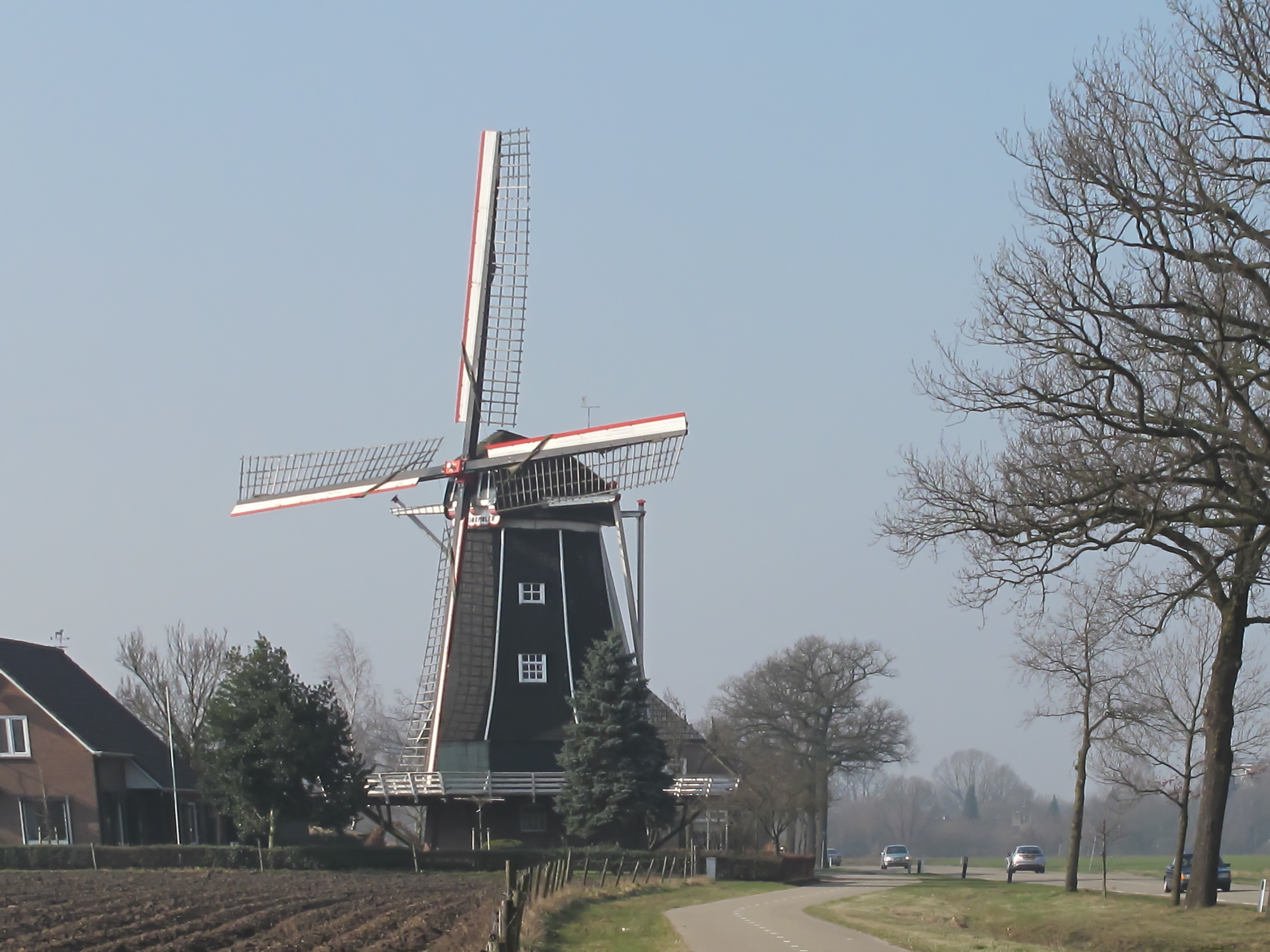
Doetinchem, windmill: Benninkmolen

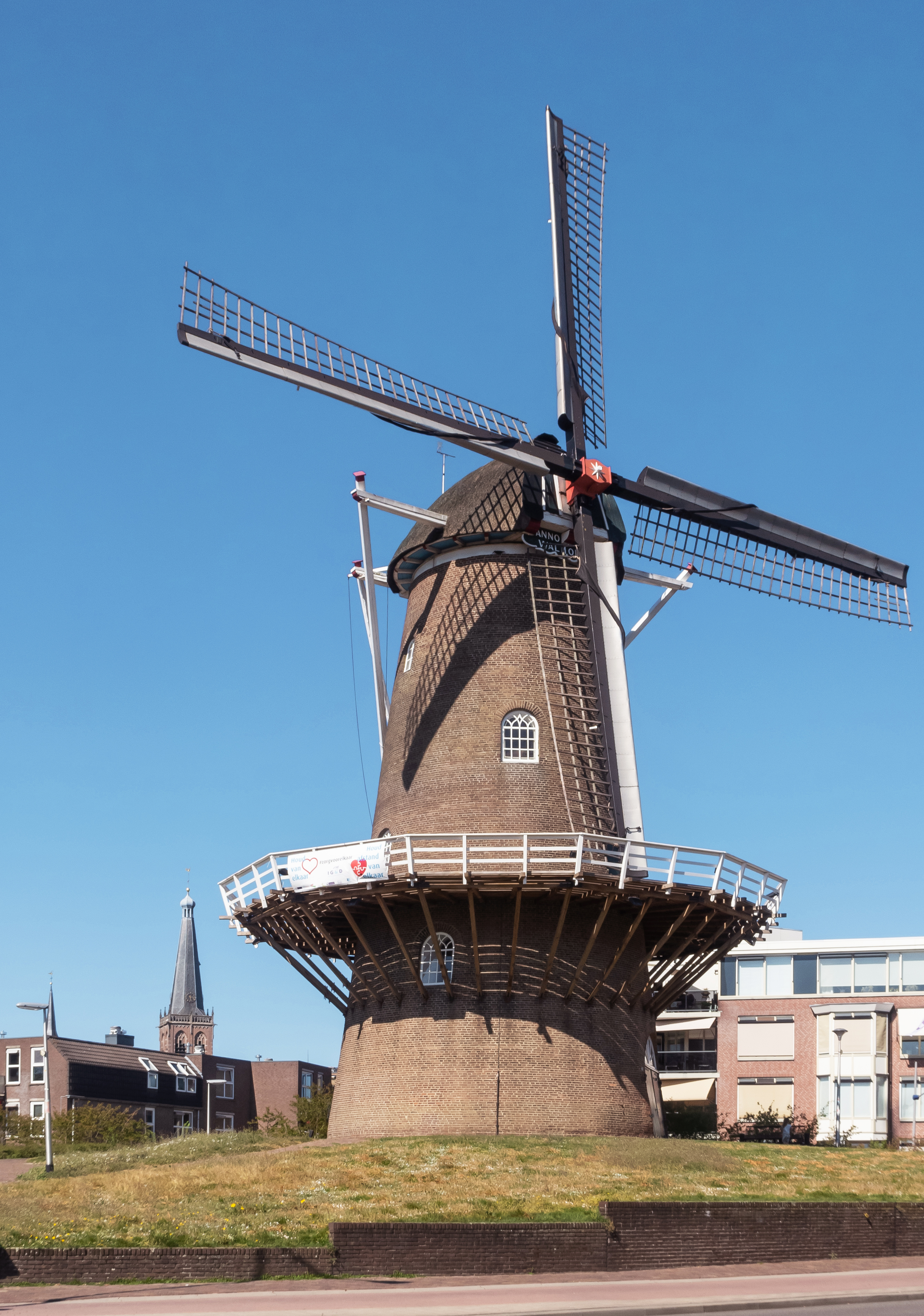
Doetinchem, windmill:

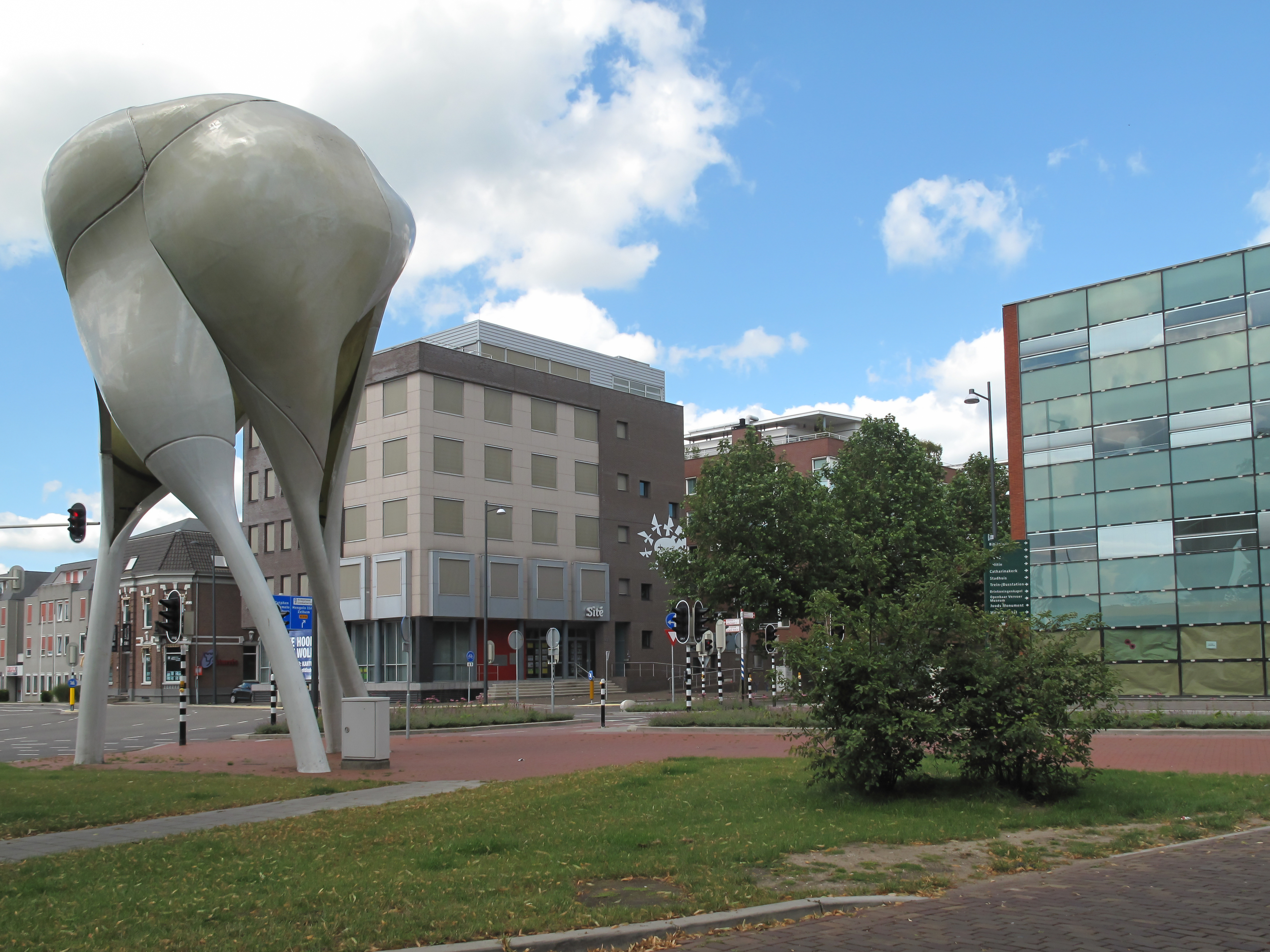
Doetinchem, street art: de D-toren

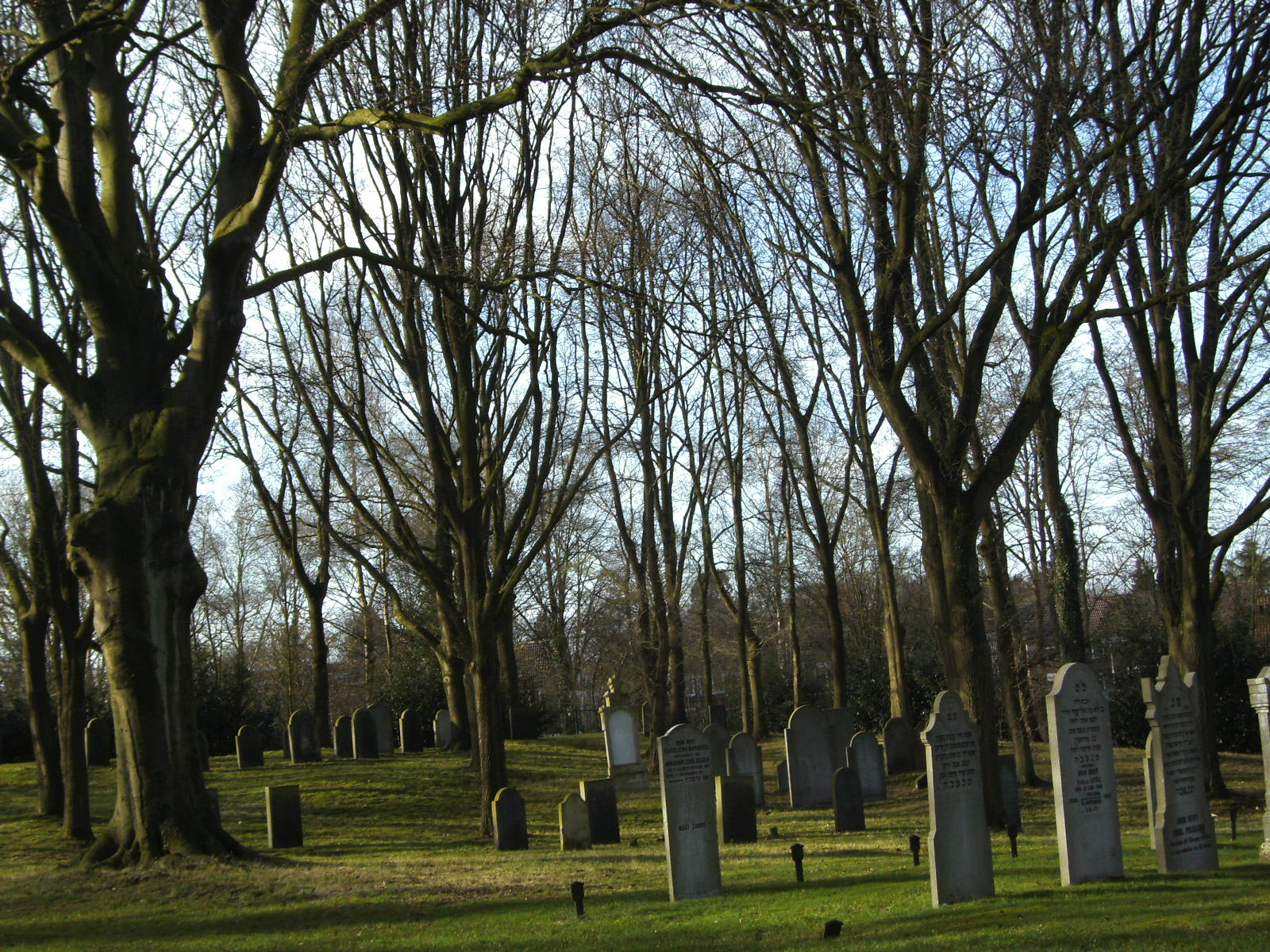
Jewish cemetery of Doetichem
