= Boskoop Snijdelwijk railway station =

Railway station in the Netherlands

Boskoop Snijdelwijk
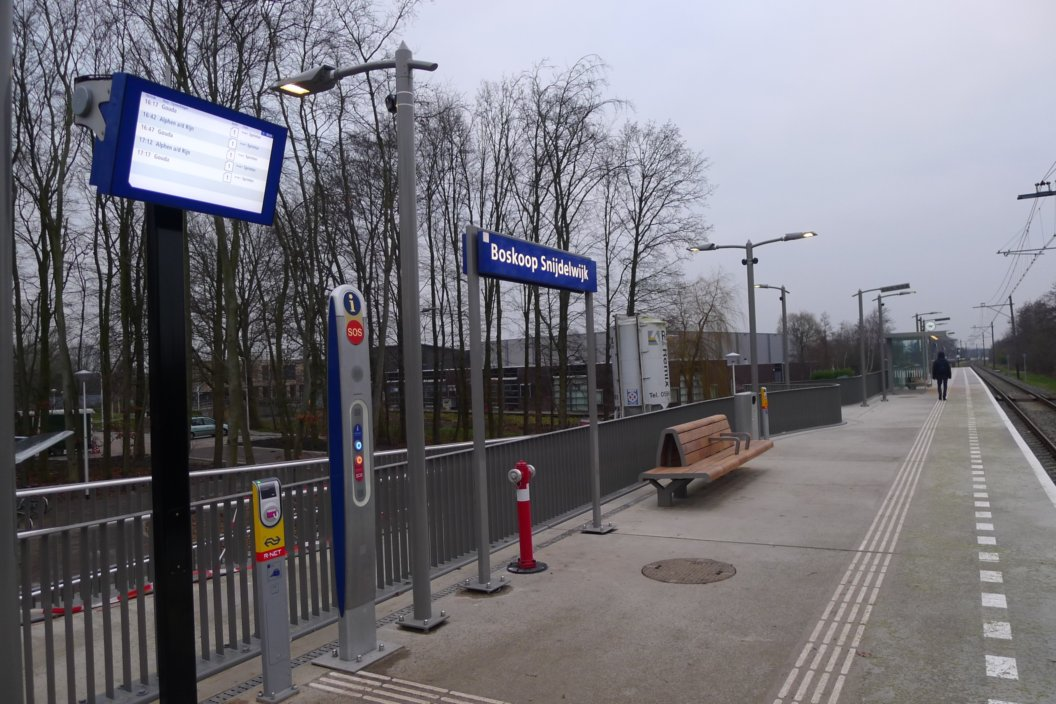

General information
- Location: Netherlands
- Coordinates: 52.0676°N 4.6462°E
- Operator: Nederlandse Spoorwegen
- Line: Gouda–Alphen aan den Rijn railway

History
- Opened: 2017

Services
Preceding station	Nederlandse Spoorwegen	Following station
Boskoop towards Alphen aan den Rijn	NS Sprinter 8600	Waddinxveen Noord towards Gouda
Boskoop towards Alphen aan den Rijn	NS Sprinter 8700	Waddinxveen Noord towards Gouda
Location
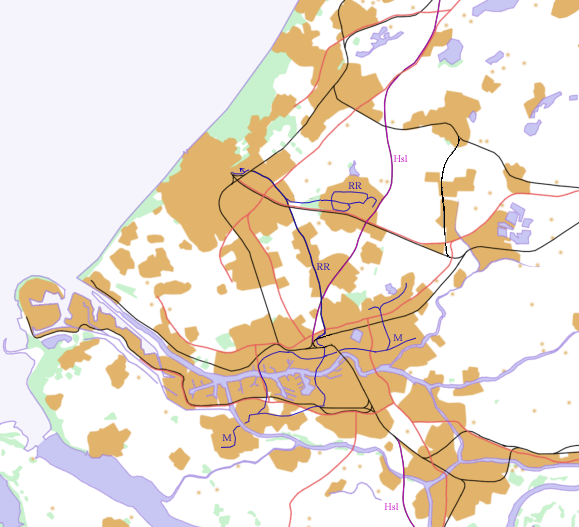
- Location within Southwest Randstad Location within Netherlands

Boskoop Snijdelwijk railway station is a railway station in Boskoop, South Holland, Netherlands that opened on 10 December 2017. It is located on the Gouda–Alphen aan den Rijn railway, which connects Gouda and Alphen aan den Rijn, between Boskoop and Waddinxveen Noord stations.
