= Waddinxveen railway station =

Railway station in the Netherlands

Waddinxveen
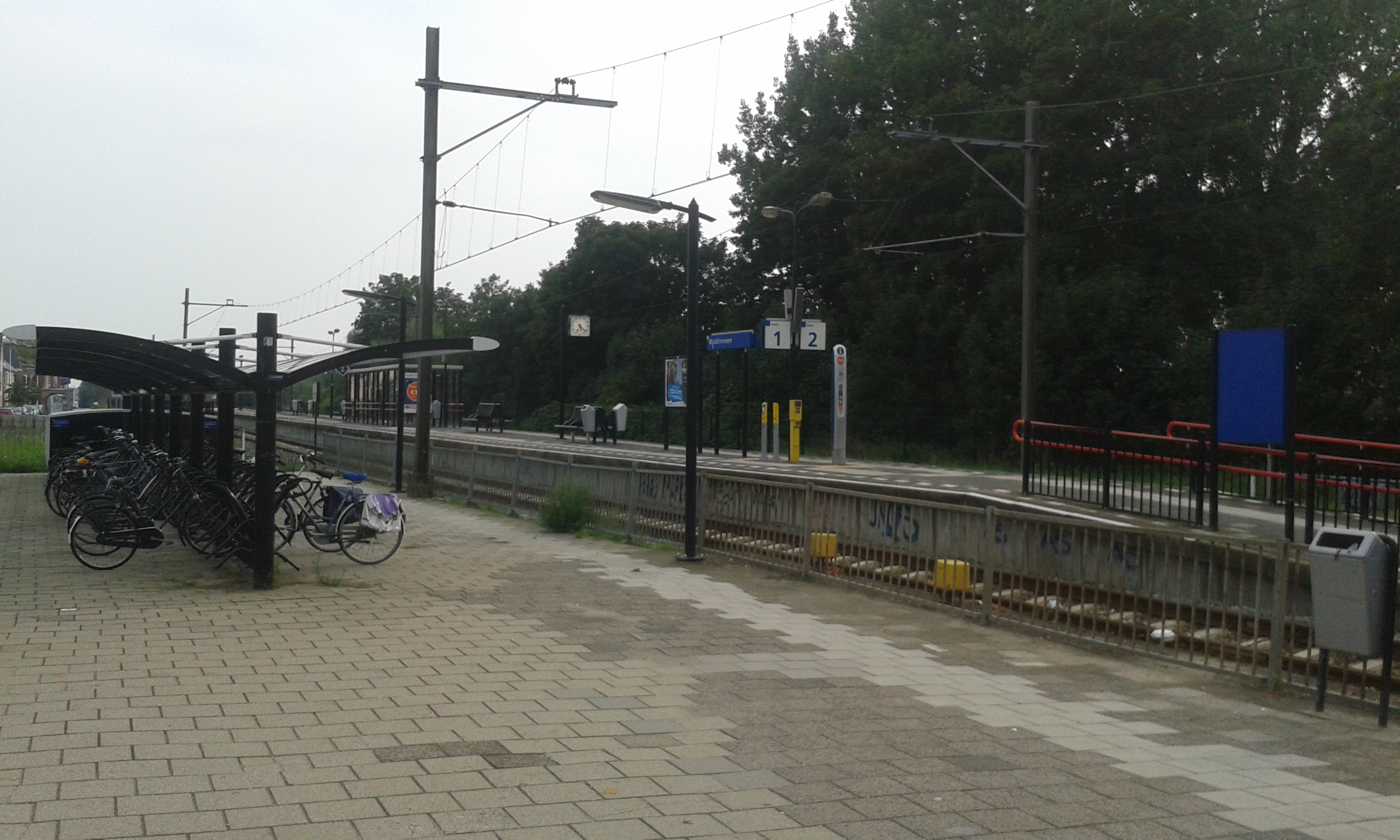

General information
- Location: Waddinxveen, South Holland, Netherlands
- Coordinates: 52°02′40″N 4°38′59″E
- Owner: Nederlandse Spoorwegen
- Line: Gouda–Alphen aan den Rijn railway
- Platforms: 2
- Tracks: 2

History
- Opened: 7 October 1934

Services
Preceding station	Nederlandse Spoorwegen	Following station
Waddinxveen Noord towards Alphen aan den Rijn	NS Sprinter 8600	Waddinxveen Triangel towards Gouda
Waddinxveen Noord towards Alphen aan den Rijn	NS Sprinter 8700	Waddinxveen Triangel towards Gouda
Location
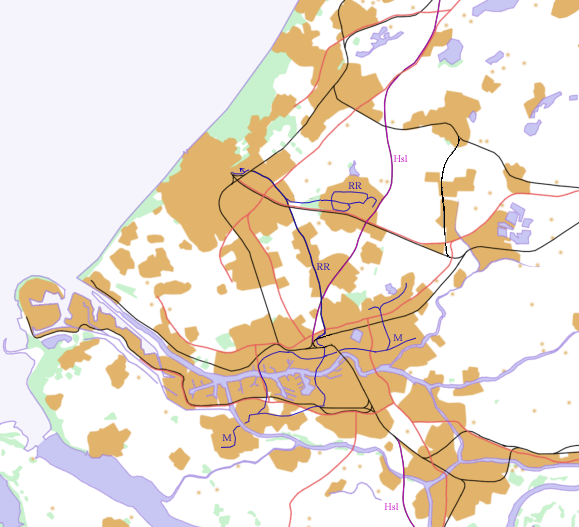
- Location within Southwest Randstad Location within Netherlands

Waddinxveen is a railway station in Waddinxveen, Netherlands. The station opened on 7 October 1934 and is on the Gouda–Alphen aan den Rijn railway. The train services are operated by Nederlandse Spoorwegen.

== Train services ==
The following train services call at Waddinxveen:

- 4x per hour local service (sprinter) Alphen aan den Rijn - Gouda (2x per hour in evenings & weekends)

== Bus services ==
- 175 (Rotterdam Alexander - Rotterdam Nesselande - Waddinxveen - Waddinxveen Noord)
