= Waddinxveen Noord railway station =

Railway station in the Netherlands

Waddinxveen Noord
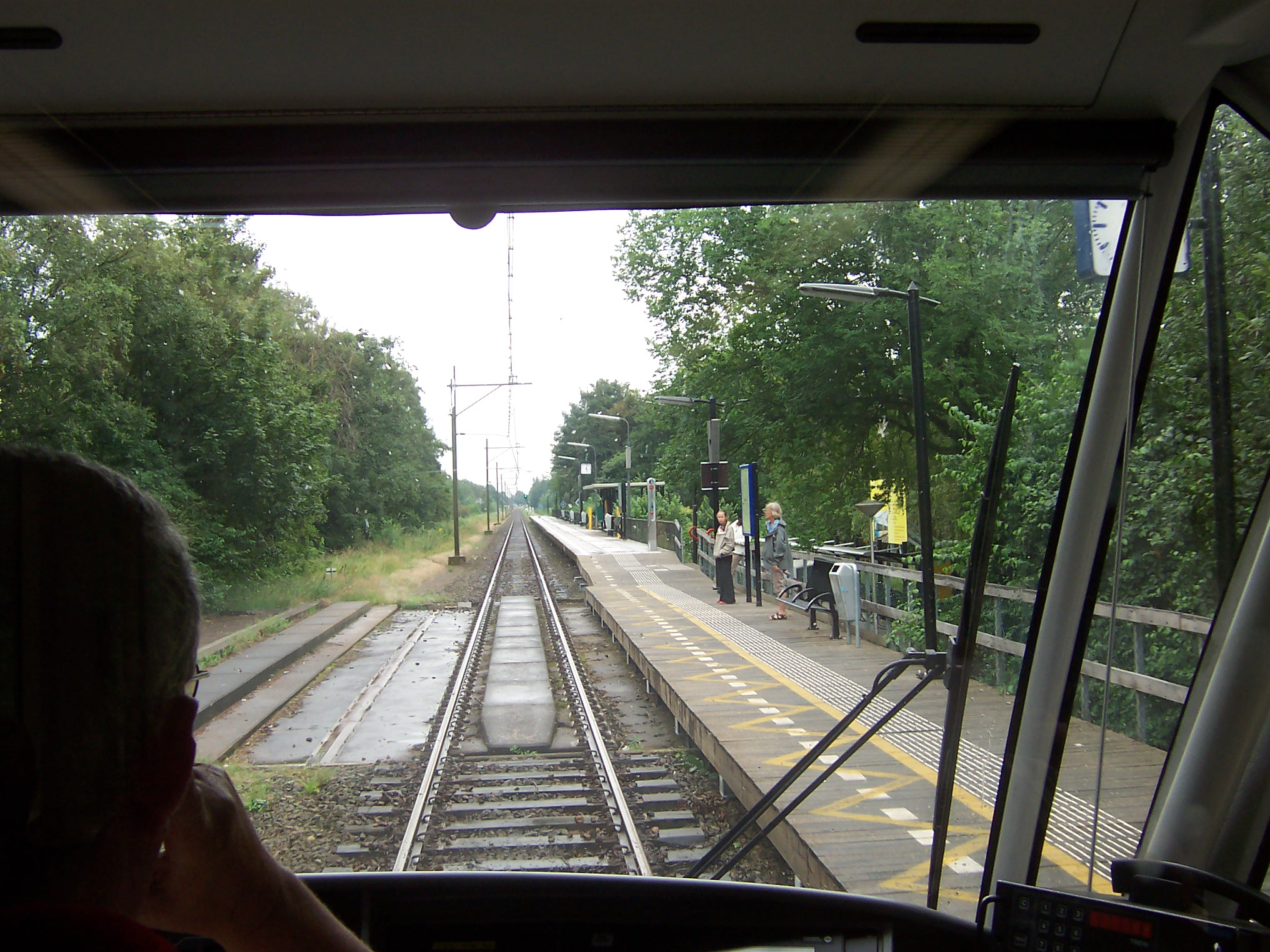

General information
- Location: Waddinxveen, South Holland, Netherlands
- Coordinates: 52°03′20″N 4°38′54″E
- Owner: Nederlandse Spoorwegen
- Line: Gouda–Alphen aan den Rijn railway
- Platforms: 2
- Tracks: 2

History
- Opened: 3 June 1973

Services
Preceding station	Nederlandse Spoorwegen	Following station
Boskoop Snijdelwijk towards Alphen aan den Rijn	NS Sprinter 8600	Waddinxveen towards Gouda
Boskoop Snijdelwijk towards Alphen aan den Rijn	NS Sprinter 8700	Waddinxveen towards Gouda
Location
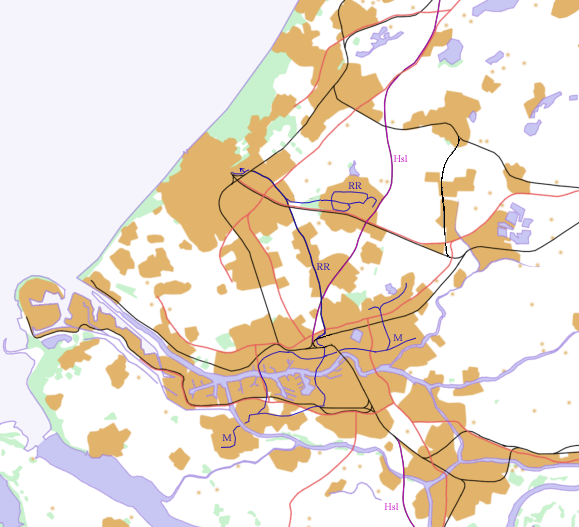
- Location within Southwest Randstad Location within Netherlands

Waddinxveen Noord is a railway station in northern Waddinxveen, Netherlands. The station opened on 3 June 1973 and is on the Gouda–Alphen aan den Rijn railway. The train services are operated by Nederlandse Spoorwegen.

== Train services ==
The following train services call at Waddinxveen Noord:

- 4x per hour local service (sprinter) Alphen aan den Rijn - Gouda (2x per hour in evenings & weekends)

== Bus Services ==
- 175 (Rotterdam Alexander - Rotterdam Nesselande - Waddinxveen - Waddinxveen Noord)
- 187 (Oegstgeest - Leiden - Zoeterwoude-Rijndijk - Hazerswoude - Waddinxveen - Gouda)
