= Boskoop railway station =

Railway station in the Netherlands

Boskoop
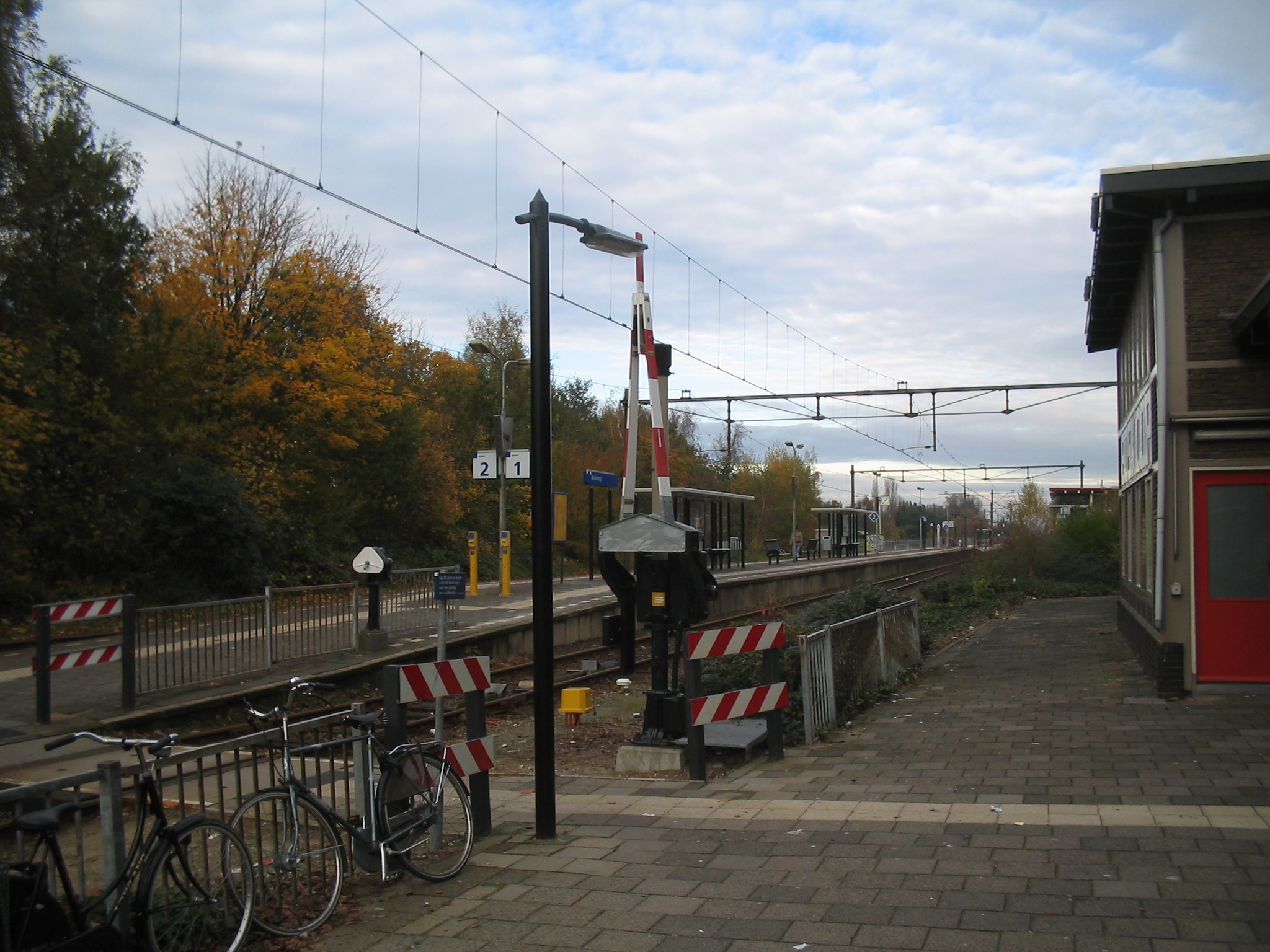

General information
- Location: Netherlands
- Coordinates: 52°04′37″N 4°38′48″E
- Operator: Nederlandse Spoorwegen
- Line: Gouda–Alphen aan den Rijn railway

Other information
- Station code: Bsk

History
- Opened: 1934

Services
Preceding station	Nederlandse Spoorwegen	Following station
Alphen aan den Rijn Terminus	NS Sprinter 8600	Boskoop Snijdelwijk towards Gouda
Alphen aan den Rijn Terminus	NS Sprinter 8700	Boskoop Snijdelwijk towards Gouda
Location
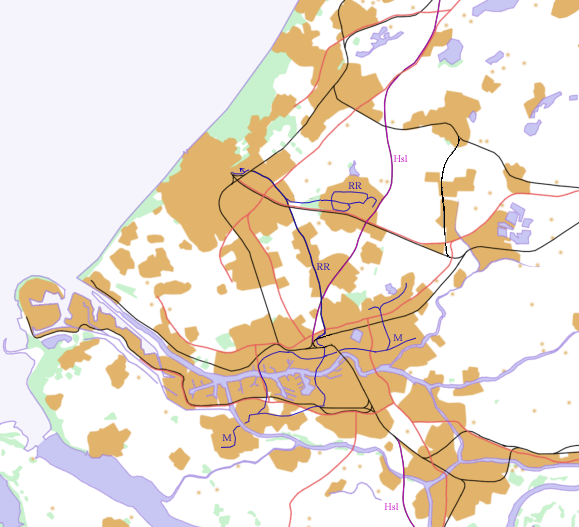
- Location within Southwest Randstad Location within Netherlands

The Boskoop railway station is a railway station in Boskoop, Netherlands, located on the RijnGouweLijn between Gouda and Alphen aan den Rijn. The railway station was opened on 7 October 1934 to transport the products of the local horticultural nurseries.

== Train services ==
The following train services call at Boskoop:

- 2x per hour local service (sprinter) Alphen aan den Rijn - Gouda
- 2x per hour local service (stoptrein) Leiden - Alphen aan den Rijn - Gouda (Peak hours only)
