= Zuidwijk =

- City
- Interactive map of Zuidwijk
- Coordinates: 51°53′N 4°29′E
- Country: Netherlands

Zuidwijk is a former municipality in the Dutch province of South Holland. It was located southeast of the center of Boskoop.

Zuidwijk was a separate municipality between 1817 and 1846, when it became part of Boskoop.

Since 2014 Boskoop has been a part of Alphen aan den Rijn.
