= Dutch railway services =

Index page of all the rail services operated in the Netherlands

Schematic of the 2018 ProRail timetable

Dutch railway services is an index page of all the rail services operated in the Netherlands.

Railway services in the Netherlands are operated by the following (see also rail transport operators in the Netherlands):

- Nederlandse Spoorwegen
- NS International
- Keolis Nederland
- Breng
- Arriva
- Connexxion
- DB Regio NRW
- Qbuzz
- R-net
- GoVolta

In the Netherlands there are three types of domestic train services on the main lines, these are:

- Intercity Direct - Domestic Intercity Service which runs along the high speed line (up to 200 km/h).
- Intercity - An express, limited-stop service, often calling only at major railway stations; in some cases it has stops at all stations along part of the route.
- Sprinter - A local service usually calling at all stations along the route, operated mostly by Flirt, Sprinter Next Generation or SLT stock.

Private operators running on regional lines use other brands:

- Sneltrein - A semi-fast service, trains skip minor stations along the route.
- Stoptrein - A service with stops at all stations along the route.

The 'Sneltrein' and 'Stoptrein' services used to be operated on the main lines as well. Since 2007 both services were being phased out. As of December 2011, all 'Sneltrein' services on the main lines had been replaced by either 'Intercity' services or 'Sprinter' services. Meanwhile, all 'Stoptrein' services on the main lines had been rebranded into 'Sprinter' services.

International (high speed) services to countries such as Belgium, France and Germany are mostly operated by NS International and Thalys, although other operators have international services as well, such as Deutsche Bahn and Belgian Railway services.

Below the train services are arranged by type, and for each type ordered by number. For a combined sortable table with links to timetables, but listing less stations, see Train routes in the Netherlands.

== Services ==
Series	Operator	Train Type	Route	Rolling Stock	Frequency	Notes
120 / 220	DB Fernverkehr	ICE	Amsterdam Centraal - Utrecht Centraal - Arnhem Centraal - Oberhausen Hbf - Duisburg Hbf - Düsseldorf Hbf - Köln Hbf - Siegburg/Bonn - Frankfurt/Main Flughafen - (Frankfurt (Main) Hbf) - Mannheim Hbf - Stuttgart Hbf - Ulm Hbf - Augsburg Hbf - München Hbf	ICE 3neo	6x per day to Frankfurt, 1x per day to München	Branded ICE 78. Reservation recommended
140 / 240	DB Fernverkehr	ICE	Amsterdam Centraal - Hilversum -Amersfoort - Apeldoorn - Deventer - Hengelo - Bad Bentheim - Rheine - Osnabrück Hbf - Bünde(Westf) - Hannover Hbf - Berlin-Spandau - Berlin Hbf - Berlin Ostbahnhof	ICE 3neo	6x per day to Berlin, 1x per day to Hannover	Branded ICE 77. Reservation recommended
320	GoVolta		Amsterdam Centraal - Amersfoort Centraal - Deventer - Hengelo - Bad Bentheim - Osnabrück Hbf - Hannover Hbf - Berlin Gesundbrunnen	Class 1700 + coaches	1x per day, not on Tuesdays	
500	NS	Intercity	Den Haag Centraal - Gouda - Utrecht Centraal - Amersfoort - Zwolle - Assen - Groningen	VIRM, DDZ	1x per hour	
600	NS	Intercity	Den Haag Centraal - Gouda - Utrecht Centraal - Amersfoort - Zwolle - Meppel - Steenwijk - Heerenveen - Leeuwarden	DDZ	1x per hour	
700	NS	Intercity	Schiphol Airport - Amsterdam Zuid - Almere Centrum - Lelystad Centrum - Zwolle - Assen - Groningen	ICM	1x per hour	Combined half-hourly services with Intercity 500 between Zwolle-Groningen and with Intercity 800 between Schiphol Airport-Zwolle
800	NS	Intercity	Schiphol Airport - Amsterdam Zuid - Almere Centrum - Lelystad Centrum - Zwolle - Meppel - Steenwijk - Heerenveen - Leeuwarden	ICM	1x per hour	Combined half-hourly services with Intercity 600 between Zwolle-Leeuwarden and with Intercity 700 between Schiphol Airport-Zwolle
1100	NS	Intercity	Den Haag Centraal - Den Haag HS - Delft - Rotterdam Centraal - Breda - Tilburg - Eindhoven Centraal	ICNG, TRAXX + coaches	1x per hour	
1400	NS	Nachtnet	Rotterdam Centraal - Delft - Den Haag CS - Leiden Centraal - (Schiphol Airport) - (Amsterdam Bijlmer ArenA) - Amsterdam Centraal - Utrecht Centraal	ICM, VIRM	1x per hour, nights only	No service on Wednesday nights. On Tuesday nights, trains stop in Amsterdam Bijlmer ArenA. All other nights, trains stop in Schiphol Airport.
1500	NS	Intercity	Amsterdam Centraal - Hilversum - Amersfoort Centraal (- Apeldoorn - Deventer)	ICM	2x per hour	Extends to Deventer 2x hour in Peak, every 2 hours during off peak
1700	NS	Intercity	Den Haag Centraal - Gouda - Utrecht Centraal - Amersfoort Centraal - Apeldoorn - Deventer - Almelo - Hengelo - Enschede	ICM, DDZ	2x per hour	After 20:00, trains are joined with Series 2800 between Utrecht and Rotterdam Centraal.
1800	NS	Intercity Direct	Breda - Rotterdam Centraal - Schiphol Airport - Amsterdam Zuid - Duivendrecht - Hilversum - Amersfoort Centraal - Amersfoort Schothorst	ICNG	2x per hour	
2000	NS	Intercity	Rotterdam Centraal - Rotterdam Alexander - Gouda - Utrecht Centraal	ICM, SNG	2x per hour	Does not run after 20:30 and early on Weekend mornings
2100	NS	Intercity	Amsterdam Centraal - Amsterdam Sloterdijk- Haarlem - Heemstede-Aerdenhout - Leiden Centraal - Den Haag Centraal	VIRM	2x per hour	Not after 21:30 nor on Sundays before 10:30
2200	NS	Intercity	Amsterdam Centraal - Amsterdam Sloterdijk – Haarlem - Heemstede-Aerdenhout - Leiden Centraal - Den Haag Laan van NOI – Den Haag HS - Delft - Schiedam Centrum - Rotterdam Centraal - Rotterdam Blaak - Dordrecht - Roosendaal - Bergen op Zoom - Rilland-Bath - Krabbendijke - Kruiningen-Yerseke - Kapelle-Biezelinge - Goes - Arnemuiden - Middelburg - Vlissingen Souburg - Vlissingen	VIRM	1x per hour	After 20:00 and on Weekends, operates 2x hour
2300	NS	Intercity	Amsterdam Centraal - Amsterdam Sloterdijk – Haarlem - Heemstede-Aerdenhout - Leiden Centraal - Den Haag Laan van NOI – Den Haag HS - Delft - Schiedam Centrum - Rotterdam Centraal - Rotterdam Blaak - Dordrecht - Roosendaal - Bergen op Zoom - Goes - Middelburg - Vlissingen	VIRM	1x per hour	Does not operate after 20:00 and on weekends
2400	NS	Intercity Direct	Lelystad Centrum - Almere Buiten - Almere Centrum - Duivendrecht - Amsterdam Zuid - Schiphol Airport - Rotterdam Centraal	ICNG	1x per hour, no service after 20:00 and on Sundays	
2500	NMBS	Stoptrein (NMBS: L-trein)	Roosendaal - Essen (Belgium) - Wildert - Kalmthout - Kijkuit - Heide - Kapellen - Sint-Mariaburg - Ekeren - Antwerpen Noorderdokken - Antwerpen-Luchtbal - Antwerpen-Centraal - Antwerpen-Berchem - Antwerpen-Zuid - onwards to Puurs (weekdays) or Lokeren (weekend)	MS75	1x per hour	international local service to/from Belgium
2600	NS	Intercity	Amsterdam Centraal - Almere Centrum	ICM	2x per hour	
2700	NS	Intercity	(Den Helder - Den Helder Zuid - Anna Paulowna - Schagen - Heerhugowaard - Alkmaar Noord - ) Alkmaar - Castricum - Zaandam - Amsterdam Sloterdijk - Amsterdam Centraal - Amsterdam Amstel - Utrecht Centraal – 's-Hertogenbosch - Eindhoven - Weert - Roermond - Sittard - Maastricht	VIRM	2x hour	Mon-Thur before 19:00: Alkmaar-Maastricht. Fri-Sun before 19:00: Alkmaar-Amsterdam C only. Some peak hour trips extend to Den Helder.
2800	NS	Intercity	Rotterdam Centraal - Rotterdam Alexander - Gouda - Utrecht Centraal	ICM	2x per hour	
2900	NS	Intercity	Enkhuizen - Bovenkarspel Flora - Bovenkarspel-Grootebroek - Hoogkarspel - Hoorn Kersenboogerd - Hoorn - Amsterdam Sloterdijk - Amsterdam Centraal - Amsterdam Amstel - Utrecht Centraal – 's-Hertogenbosch - Eindhoven - Weert - Roermond - Sittard - Maastricht	VIRM	2x per hour	Only operates after 19:00 and all day Friday-Sunday
3000	NS	Intercity	Den Helder - Den Helder Zuid - Anna Paulowna - Schagen – Heerhugowaard - Alkmaar Noord - Alkmaar - Heiloo - Castricum - Zaandam - Amsterdam Sloterdijk - Amsterdam Centraal - Amsterdam Amstel - Utrecht Centraal - Driebergen-Zeist - (Veenendaal-De Klomp) - Ede-Wageningen - Arnhem - Nijmegen	VIRM	2x per hour	Extra stop at Veenendaal-De Klomp after 19:00
3100	NS	Intercity	Den Haag Centraal - Leiden Centraal - Schiphol Airport - Amsterdam Zuid - Amsterdam Bijlmer ArenA - Utrecht Centraal - (Veenendaal-De Klomp) - Ede-Wageningen - Arnhem Centraal - Nijmegen	VIRM	2x per hour	Only stops in Veenendaal-De Klomp Friday-Sunday before 19:00
3200	NS	Intercity	Rotterdam Centraal - Delft - Den Haag HS - Den Haag Laan van NOI - Leiden Centraal - Schiphol Airport - Amsterdam Zuid - Amsterdam Bijlmer ArenA - Utrecht Centraal - Veenendaal-De Klomp - Ede-Wageningen - Arnhem Centraal	VIRM	2x per hour	Monday-Thursday before 19:00 only
3400	NS	Intercity	Alkmaar - Beverwijk - Haarlem	SGMm, SLT, NID	2x per hour	Peak hours only
3500	NS	Intercity	Schiphol Airport - Amsterdam Zuid - Amsterdam Bijlmer ArenA - Utrecht Centraal - 's-Hertogenbosch - Eindhoven - Helmond - Deurne - Horst-Sevenum - Blerick - Venlo	VIRM	2x per hour	The section Utrecht Centraal-Venlo is not served on evenings after ± 11pm
3600	NS	Intercity	Zwolle - Wijhe - Olst - Deventer - Zutphen - Dieren - Arnhem Centraal - Nijmegen - Oss - 's-Hertogenbosch - Tilburg - Breda - Etten-Leur - Roosendaal	DDZ	2x per hour	
3700	NS	Intercity	Enkhuizen - Bovenkarspel Flora - Bovenkarspel-Grootebroek - Hoogkarspel - Hoorn Kersenboogerd - Hoorn - Purmerend - Amsterdam Sloterdijk - Amsterdam Centraal	VIRM, SNG	2x hour	Mon-Thurs peak hours only
3800	Arriva	Sneltrein	Zwolle - Dalfsen - Ommen - Mariënberg - Hardenberg - Coevorden - Nieuw Amsterdam - Emmen Zuid - Emmen	Stadler GTW	1x per hour	Does not operate in the peak direction during peak hours.
3900	NS	Intercity	Enkhuizen - Bovenkarspel Flora - Bovenkarspel-Grootebroek - Hoogkarspel - Hoorn Kersenboogerd - Hoorn - Amsterdam Sloterdijk - Amsterdam Centraal - Amsterdam Amstel - Utrecht Centraal – 's-Hertogenbosch - Eindhoven - Weert - Roermond - Sittard - Heerlen	VIRM	2x per hour	After 19:30 and on Fridays-Sundays, only runs Eindhoven-Heerlen
4000	NS	Sprinter	Uitgeest - Krommenie-Assendelft - Wormerveer - Koog-Zaandijk - Koog Bloemwijk - Zaandam - Amsterdam Sloterdijk - Amsterdam Centraal - Amsterdam Muiderpoort - Amsterdam Amstel - Duivendrecht - Amsterdam Bijlmer ArenA - Amsterdam Holendrecht - Abcoude - Breukelen - Woerden - Gouda Goverwelle - Gouda - Nieuwerkerk a/d IJssel - Capelle Schollevaar - Rotterdam Alexander - Rotterdam Noord - Rotterdam Centraal	SLT	2x per hour	
4100	NS	Sprinter	Hoofddorp - Schiphol Airport - Amsterdam Lelylaan - Amsterdam Sloterdijk - Zaandam - Zaandam Kogerveld - Purmerend Weidevenne - Purmerend - Purmerend Overwhere - Hoorn - Hoorn Kersenboogerd	SNG	2x per hour	
4300	NS	Sprinter	Den Haag Centraal – Den Haag Laan van NOI – Den Haag Mariahoeve – Voorschoten – De Vink – Leiden Centraal – Sassenheim – Nieuw Vennep – Hoofddorp – Schiphol Airport – Amsterdam Zuid – Amsterdam RAI - Duivendrecht – Diemen Zuid - Weesp - Almere Poort – Almere Muziekwijk - Almere Centrum – Almere Parkwijk - Almere Buiten - Almere Oostvaarders - Lelystad Centrum	SLT	2x per hour	
4400	NS	Sprinter	Deurne - Helmond Brouwhuis - Helmond - Helmond 't Hout - Helmond Brandevoort - Eindhoven Centraal - Eindhoven Strijp-S - Best - Boxtel - Vught - 's-Hertogenbosch ( - 's-Hertogenbosch Oost - Rosmalen - Oss West - Oss)	NS FLIRT	2x per hour	Only extends to Oss during AM Peak. Runs nonstop 's-Hertogenbosch → Oss, return trip stops all stations
4600	NS	Sprinter	Amsterdam Centraal - Amsterdam Muiderpoort - Amsterdam Science Park - Diemen - Weesp - Almere Poort - Almere Muziekwijk - Almere Centrum - Almere Parkwijk - Almere Buiten - Almere Oostvaarders	SNG	2x per hour	No service after 20:00
4800	NS	Sprinter	Amsterdam Centraal – Amsterdam Sloterdijk - Halfweg-Zwanenburg - Haarlem Spaarnwoude - Haarlem - Bloemendaal - Santpoort Zuid - Santpoort Noord – Driehuis - Beverwijk - Heemskerk - Uitgeest - Castricum - Heiloo - Alkmaar - Alkmaar Noord - Heerhugowaard - Obdam - Hoorn		2x per hour	
4900	NS	Sprinter	Utrecht Centraal - Utrecht Overvecht (-Hollandsche Rading) - Hilversum Sportpark - Hilversum - Naarden-Bussum - Almere Poort - Almere Muziekwijk - Almere Centrum	SNG, SLT	2x per hour	Only stops at Hollandsche Rading after 20:00
5000	NS	Sprinter	Den Haag Centraal - Den Haag HS - Den Haag Moerwijk - Rijswijk - Delft - Delft Campus - Schiedam Centrum - Rotterdam Centraal - Rotterdam Blaak - Rotterdam Zuid - Rotterdam Lombardijen - Barendrecht - Zwijndrecht - Dordrecht	SNG	2x per hour	Does not run after 20:00 and Weekends
5100	NS	Sprinter	Den Haag Centraal - Den Haag HS - Den Haag Moerwijk - Rijswijk - Delft - Delft Campus - Schiedam Centrum - Rotterdam Centraal - Rotterdam Blaak - Rotterdam Zuid - Rotterdam Lombardijen - Barendrecht - Zwijndrecht - Dordrecht	SNG	2x per hour	
5200	NS	Sprinter	Den Haag Centraal - Den Haag HS - Den Haag Moerwijk - Rijswijk - Delft - Delft Campus - Schiedam Centrum - Rotterdam Centraal - Rotterdam Blaak - Rotterdam Zuid - Rotterdam Lombardijen - Barendrecht - Zwijndrecht - Dordrecht	SNG	2x per hour	Only operates Monday-Thursday until 19:00 - Does not stop in Schiedam Centrum
5300	Arriva	Sneltrein	Liège-Guillemins – Bressoux – Visé – Eijsden – Maastricht Randwijck – Maastricht - Meerssen - Valkenburg – Heerlen – Landgraaf - Herzogenrath - Aachen West - Aachen Hbf	Stadler FLIRT	1x per hour	Run in cooperation with SNCB until Maastricht
5400	NS	Sprinter	Amsterdam Centraal - Amsterdam Sloterdijk - Halfweg-Zwanenburg - Haarlem Spaarnwoude - Haarlem - Overveen - Zandvoort	SLT	2x per hour	
5500	NS	Sprinter	Utrecht Centraal - Utrecht Overvecht - Bilthoven - Den Dolder - Soest Zuid - Soest - Soestdijk - Baarn	SLT	2x per hour	
5600	NS	Sprinter	Utrecht Centraal - Utrecht Overvecht - Bilthoven - Den Dolder - Amersfoort - Amersfoort Schothorst - Amersfoort Vathorst - Nijkerk - Putten - Ermelo - Harderwijk - Nunspeet - 't Harde - Wezep - Zwolle	SNG	2x per hour	
5700	NS	Sprinter	Utrecht Centraal - Utrecht Overvecht - Hollandsche Rading - Hilversum Sportpark - Hilversum - Hilversum Media Park - Bussum Zuid - Naarden-Bussum - Weesp - Diemen Zuid - Duivendrecht - Amsterdam RAI - Amsterdam Zuid - Schiphol Airport - Hoofddorp (- Nieuw Vennep - Sassenheim - Leiden Centraal)	SLT, SNG	2x per hour	No service after 20:30. In weekend, only runs Utrecht Centraal-Hoofddorp
5800	NS	Sprinter	Amsterdam Centraal - Amsterdam Muiderpoort - Amsterdam Science Park - Diemen - Weesp - Naarden-Bussum - Bussum Zuid - Hilversum Media Park – Hilversum - Baarn - Amersfoort Centraal - Amersfoort Schothorst - Amersfoort Vathorst	SNG	2x per hour	In early morning and late evening, does not run between Amersfoort C and Vathorst
5900	NS	Sprinter	Dordrecht - Dordrecht Zuid - Lage Zwaluwe - Zevenbergen - Oudenbosch - Roosendaal		2x per hour	
6000	NS	Sprinter	Den Haag Centraal - Voorburg - Den Haag Ypenburg - Zoetermeer - Zoetermeer Oost - Lansingerland-Zoetermeer - Gouda - Gouda Goverwelle - Woerden - Vleuten - Utrecht Terwijde- Utrecht Leidsche Rijn - Utrecht Centraal - - Utrecht Vaartsche Rijn - Utrecht Lunetten - Houten - Houten Castellum - Culemborg - Geldermalsen - Zaltbommel - 's-Hertogenbosch	SLT	2x per hour	Only operates after 18:00 and all day Friday-Sunday
6100	NS	Sprinter	Zwolle - Meppel - Hoogeveen - Beilen - Assen - Haren - Groningen Europapark - Groningen	SNG	2x per hour	
6200	NS	Sprinter	Groningen - Groningen Europapark - Haren - Assen	SNG	2x per hour	Peak hours only
6300	NS	Sprinter	(Den Haag Centraal - Den Haag Laan van NOI - Den Haag Mariahoeve - Voorschoten - De Vink -) Leiden Centraal - Voorhout - Hillegom - Heemstede-Aerdenhout - Haarlem	SLT	2x per hour	Only Leiden Centraal - Haarlem on evenings and weekends
6400	NS	Sprinter	Tilburg Universiteit - Tilburg - Oisterwijk - Boxtel - Best - Eindhoven Strijp-S - Eindhoven Centraal - Geldrop - Heeze - Maarheeze - Weert	NS FLIRT	2x per hour	
6500	NS	Sprinter	Roosendaal - Bergen op Zoom - Rilland-Bath - Krabbendijke - Kruiningen-Yerseke - Kapelle-Biezelinge - Goes - Arnemuiden - Middelburg - Vlissingen Souburg - Vlissingen	SNG	1x per hour, no service after 20:00 and on weekends	
6600	NS	Sprinter	Dordrecht - Dordrecht Zuid - Lage Zwaluwe - Breda-Prinsenbeek - Breda - Gilze-Rijen - Tilburg Reeshof - Tilburg Universiteit - Tilburg - 's-Hertogenbosch - 's-Hertogenbosch Oost - Rosmalen - Oss West - Oss - Ravenstein - Wijchen - Nijmegen Dukenburg - Nijmegen Goffert - Nijmegen (- Nijmegen Lent - Elst - Arnhem Zuid - Arnhem Centraal)	NS FLIRT	2x per hour	After 19:00 and on Sundays, does not operate Nijmegen-Arnhem
6700	NS	Sprinter	Leiden Centraal - Leiden Lammenschans - Alphen aan den Rijn - Bodegraven - Woerden - Utrecht Centraal - Utrecht Vaartsche Rijn - Utrecht Lunetten - Houten - Houten Castellum - Culemborg - Geldermalsen - Tiel Passewaaij - Tiel	SLT	2x per hour	Only runs after 18:00 and all day Friday-Sunday
6800	NS	Sprinter	Den Haag Centraal - Voorburg - Den Haag Ypenburg - Zoetermeer - Zoetermeer Oost - Lansingerland-Zoetermeer - Gouda - Gouda Goverwelle	SLT	2x per hour	Not on evenings and weekends
6900	NS	Sprinter	Den Haag Centraal - Voorburg - Den Haag Ypenburg - Zoetermeer - Zoetermeer Oost - Lansingerland-Zoetermeer - Gouda - Gouda Goverwelle - Woerden - Vleuten - Utrecht Terwijde - Utrecht Leidsche Rijn - Utrecht Centraal - Utrecht Vaartsche Rijn - Utrecht Lunetten - Houten - Houten Castellum - Culemborg - Geldermalsen - Tiel Passewaaij - Tiel	SLT	2x per hour	Mon-Thurs until 18:00
7000	NS	Sprinter	Apeldoorn - Apeldoorn Osseveld - Twello - Deventer - Deventer Colmschate - Holten - Rijssen - Wierden - Almelo (- Almelo de Riet - Borne - Hengelo - Enschede Kennispark - Enschede)	SNG	2x per hour (evenings and weekends: 1x per hour)	Onwards to Enschede during peak hours only. Some additional evening Deventer - Almelo services
7100	Qbuzz	Stoptrein	Dordrecht - Dordrecht Stadspolders - Sliedrecht Baanhoek -Sliedrecht - Hardinxveld-Giessendam - Boven-Hardinxveld - Gorinchem	Stadler GTW	2x per hour	Not after 20:30 and on Sundays
7200	Qbuzz	Stoptrein	Dordrecht - Dordrecht Stadspolders - Sliedrecht Baanhoek -Sliedrecht - Hardinxveld Blauwe Zoom - Hardinxveld-Giessendam - Boven-Hardinxveld - Gorinchem - Arkel - Leerdam - Beesd - Geldermalsen	Stadler GTW	2x per hour	
7300	NS	Sprinter	Breukelen - Maarssen - Utrecht Zuilen - Utrecht Centraal - Utrecht Vaartsche Rijn - Bunnik - Driebergen-Zeist - Maarn - Veenendaal West - Veenendaal Centrum - Rhenen	SNG	2x per hour	
7400	NS	Sprinter	Uitgeest - Krommenie-Assendelft - Wormerveer - Zaandijk Zaanse Schans - Koog aan de Zaan - Zaandam - Amsterdam Sloterdijk - Amsterdam Centraal - Amsterdam Muiderpoort - Amsterdam Amstel - Duivendrecht - Amsterdam Bijlmer ArenA - Amsterdam Holendrecht - Abcoude - Breukelen - Maarssen - Utrecht Zuilen - Utrecht Centraal - Bunnik - Driebergen-Zeist	SLT, SNG	2x per hour	Peak Hours Only
7500	NS	Sprinter	Ede-Wageningen - Wolfheze - Oosterbeek - Arnhem	NS FLIRT	2x per hour, 1x per hour during evenings and weekends	
7600	NS	Sprinter	(Wijchen - Nijmegen Goffert - Nijmegen Dukenburg -) Nijmegen - Nijmegen Lent - Elst - Arnhem Zuid - Arnhem - Arnhem Velperpoort - Arnhem Presikhaaf - Velp - Rheden - Dieren - Brummen - Zutphen	NS FLIRT	2x per hour	Only Nijmegen - Zutphen on evenings and Sundays
7900	Keolis Nederland	Sprinter	Zwolle - Heino - Raalte - Nijverdal - Wierden - Almelo - Almelo de Riet - Borne - Hengelo - Enschede Kennispark - Enschede	Keolis FLIRT	2x per hour	Branded RS 23 Blauwnet
8000	Arriva	Stoptrein	Zwolle - Dalfsen - Ommen - Mariënberg - Hardenberg - Gramsbergen - Coevorden - Dalen - Nieuw Amsterdam - Emmen Zuid - Emmen	Stadler GTW	1x per hour	Operates 2x hour during peak hours in peak direction only
8100	NS	Sprinter	Hoofddorp - Schiphol Airport - Amsterdam Lelylaan - Amsterdam Sloterdijk - Amsterdam Centraal	SNG	each 2x per hour	Airport Sprinter service, combined 7.5 minute frequency
8200	NS	Sprinter	Hoofddorp - Schiphol Airport - Amsterdam Lelylaan - Amsterdam Sloterdijk - Amsterdam Centraal	SNG	each 2x per hour	Airport Sprinter service, combined 7.5 minute frequency
8300	NS	Sprinter	Hoofddorp - Schiphol Airport - Amsterdam Lelylaan - Amsterdam Sloterdijk - Amsterdam Centraal	SNG	each 2x per hour	Airport Sprinter service, combined 7.5 minute frequency
8400	NS	Sprinter	Hoofddorp - Schiphol Airport - Amsterdam Lelylaan - Amsterdam Sloterdijk - Amsterdam Centraal	SNG	each 2x per hour	Airport Sprinter service, combined 7.5 minute frequency
8500	Keolis Nederland	Sprinter	Zwolle - Zwolle Stadshagen - Kampen	Keolis FLIRT	2x per hour	Branded RS 22 Blauwnet
8600	NS	Sprinter	Gouda - Waddinxveen Triangel - Waddinxveen - Waddinxveen Noord - Boskoop Snijdelwijk - Boskoop - Alphen a/d Rijn	R-net FLIRT	2x per hour	
8700	NS	Sprinter	Gouda - Waddinxveen Triangel - Waddinxveen - Waddinxveen Noord - Boskoop Snijdelwijk - Boskoop - Alphen a/d Rijn	R-net FLIRT	2x per hour	Does not operate on evenings and weekends
8800	NS	Sprinter	Leiden Centraal - Leiden Lammenschans - Alphen aan den Rijn - Bodegraven - Woerden - Utrecht Centraal - Utrecht Vaartsche Rijn - Utrecht Lunetten - Houten - Houten Castellum - Culemborg - Geldermalsen - Zaltbommel - 's-Hertogenbosch	SLT	2x per hour	Monday-Thursday until 18:00 only
8900	NS	Sprinter	Leiden Centraal - Leiden Lammenschans - Alphen a/d Rijn - Bodegraven - Woerden - Vleuten - Utrecht Terwijde - Utrecht Leidsche Rijn - Utrecht Centraal	SLT	2x per hour	Mon-Fri. Only extends to Leiden during peak hours.
9000	NS	Sprinter	Lelystad Centrum - Dronten - Kampen Zuid - Zwolle - Meppel - Steenwijk - Wolvega - Heerenveen - Akkrum - Grou-Jirnsum - Leeuwarden	SNG	2x per hour	On Evenings & Weekends, runs 2x hour Lelystad-Zwolle and 1x hour Zwolle-Leeuwarden
9100	Eurostar		Amsterdam Centraal - Rotterdam Centraal - Brussel-Zuid (- Lille Europe) (- London St Pancras)	e300, e320	4x per day	Reservation required. Some services terminate at Brussel-Zuid. Most trains skip Lille Europe
9200	NS International/NMBS	EuroCity	Rotterdam Centraal - Breda - Noorderkempen - Antwerpen-Centraal - Antwerpen-Berchem - Mechelen - Brussels National Airport - Brussel-Noord - Brussel-Centraal - Brussel-Zuid	TRAXX with coaches	1x hour	
9300	Eurostar		Amsterdam Centraal - Schiphol Airport - Rotterdam Centraal - Antwerpen-Centraal - Brussel-Zuid (- Paris Nord)	TGV PBA/TGV PBKA	13x per day	Reservation required. Some services terminate at Brussel-Zuid
9500	NS International	Eurocity Direct	(Lelystad Centrum - Almere Buiten - Almere Centrum - Duivendrecht - ) Amsterdam Zuid - Schiphol Airport - Rotterdam Centraal - Antwerpen-Centraal - Brussel-Zuid	ICNG, TRAXX + coaches	1x hour	After 20:00 and on Sundays, runs Amsterdam Zuid-Brussels only
11400	NS	Nachtnet	Rotterdam Centraal - Den Haag HS - Leiden Centraal - Schiphol Airport - Amsterdam Centraal - Utrecht Centraal -	VIRM, ICM	1x hour (overnight)	Wednesday only
11450	NS	Nachtnet	Leiden Centraal - Schiphol Airport - Amsterdam Bijlmer ArenA	VIRM	1x hour (overnight)	Tuesday only
12400	NS	Intercity Direct	Amsterdam Zuid - Schiphol Airport - Rotterdam Centraal	ICNG	1x per hour	Only Mon-Sat after 20:00 and all day Sundays
13800	Arriva	Sneltrein	Zwolle - Dalfsen - Ommen - Hardenberg - Coevorden ( - Emmen Zuid - Emmen)	Stadler GTW	2x per hour	Peak hours in peak direction only. Some trips extend to Emmen
15400	NS	Sprinter	Haarlem - Overveen - Zandvoort	NID	Additional service during July and August to complement Sprinter 4500	
17800	Arriva	Stoptrein	Apeldoorn - Apeldoorn De Maten - Klarenbeek - Voorst-Empe - Zutphen	Stadler GTW		
17900	Keolis Nederland	Intercity	Zwolle - Raalte - Nijverdal - Almelo - Hengelo - Enschede	Keolis FLIRT	1x per hour	Does not operate on evenings after 8PM, and weekends Branded IC 23 Blauwnet
20000	VIAS Rail	Regional Express	Arnhem Centraal - Zevenaar - Emmerich - Praest - Millingen (b. Rees) - Empel-Rees - Haldern (Rheinl.) - Mehrhoog - Wesel-Feldmark - Wesel - Friedrichsfeld (Niederrhein) - Voerde (Niederrhein) - Dinslaken - Oberhausen-Holten - Oberhausen-Sterkrade - Oberhausen Hbf - Duisburg Hbf - Düsseldorf-Flughafen - Düsseldorf Hbf	Stadler FLIRT	1x per hour	Branded RE 19 Rhein-IJssel-Express
20060	Eurobahn	Regional Express	Venlo - Kaldenkirchen - Breyell - Boisheim - Dülken - Viersen - Mönchengladbach Hbf - Neuss Hbf - Düsseldorf Hbf - Wuppertal-Vohwinkel - Wuppertal Hbf - Wuppertal-Barmen - Wuppertal-Oberbarmen - Schwelm - Ennepetal - Hagen Hbf - Schwerte - Holzwickede - Unna - Bönen - Hamm	Stadler FLIRT	1x per hour	Branded RE 13 Maas-Wupper-Express
20100	Arriva	Stoptrein	Groningen - Groningen Europapark - Kropswolde - Martenshoek - Hoogezand-Sappemeer - Sappemeer Oost - Zuidbroek - Scheemda - Winschoten - Bad Nieuweschans - Weener ~~(- Leer)~~	Stadler GTW	1x per hour	Currently unable to operate between Weener and Leer due to a damaged river bridge. Buses operate from Groningen and Bad Nieuweschans to Leer.
20200	DB Regio	Regional Bahn	Enschede - Enschede De Eschmarke - Glanerbrug - Gronau (Westf) - Ochtrup - Metelen Land - Burgsteinfurt - Borghorst - Nordwalde - Altenberge - Münster-Häger - Münster Zentrum Nord - Münster Hbf	DB Bombardier Talent	1x per hour	Branded RB 64 Euregio-Bahn
20250	DB Regio	Regional Bahn	Enschede - Enschede De Eschmarke - Glanerbrug - Gronau (Westf) - Epe (Westf) - Ahaus - Legden - Rosendahl-Holtwick - Coesfeld - Lette - Dülmen - Lüdinghausen - Selm - Selm-Beifang - Bork - Lünen Hbf - Preussen - Dortmund-Derne - Dortmund-Kirchderne - Dortmund Hbf	DB Bombardier Talent	1x per hour	Branded RB 51 Westmünsterland-Bahn
20300	DB Regio	Regional Express	Heerlen - Landgraaf - Eygelshoven Markt - Herzogenrath	DB Bombardier Talent	1x per hour	Branded RE 18 LIMAX
21400	NS	Nachtnet	Utrecht Centraal - 's-Hertogenbosch - Eindhoven Centraal	VIRM	1-2x/night	Friday & Saturday nights only
21410	NS	Nachtnet	Rotterdam Centraal - Dordrecht - Breda - Tilburg - Eindhoven Centraal	VIRM	1-2x/night	Friday & Saturday nights only
21420	NS	Nachtnet	Tilburg - 's-Hertogenbosch	NS FLIRT	1x/night	Friday & Saturday nights only
21430	NS	Nachtnet	Utrecht Centraal - Driebergen-Zeist - Veenendaal-De Klomp - Ede-Wageningen - Arnhem Centraal - Elst - Nijmegen	VIRM, SNG	1-2x/night	Friday & Saturday nights only
21440	NS	Nachtnet	Utrecht Centraal - Amersfoort Centraal	SNG	1-2x/night	Friday & Saturday nights only
23500	NS	Intercity	Sittard - Heerlen	VIRM	1x per hour	Only on early mornings and evenings
24400	NS	Nachtnet	Amsterdam Bijlmer ArenA - Schiphol Airport (- Leiden Centraal)		3x per day (at night)	Wednesday evenings only. Tuesday evening: 1x Amsterdam Bijlmer ArenA - Schiphol Airport
28300	NS	Museum shuttle	Utrecht Centraal - Utrecht Maliebaan	SLT, SNG	1x per hour	Only operates during Dutch Railway Museum opening hours (Not on Mondays)
30700	Breng	Stoptrein	Arnhem Centraal - Arnhem Velperpoort - Duiven - Zevenaar - Didam - Wehl - Doetinchem De Huet - Doetinchem	Stadler GTW	2x per hour	Operates on weekdays only
30800	Arriva	Stoptrein	Zutphen - Vorden - Ruurlo - Lichtenvoorde-Groenlo - Winterswijk West - Winterswijk	Stadler GTW	2x per hour (1x per hour on weekends)	
30900	Arriva	Stoptrein	Arnhem Centraal - Arnhem Velperpoort - Westervoort - Duiven - Zevenaar - Didam - Wehl - Doetinchem De Huet - Doetinchem - Gaanderen - Terborg - Varsseveld - Aalten - Winterswijk	Stadler GTW	2x per hour	
31000	Arriva	Stoptrein	Almelo - Vriezenveen - Daarlerveen - Vroomshoop - Geerdijk - Mariënberg	Stadler GTW	2x per hour (1x per hour on evenings and Sundays)	
31100	Arriva	Stoptrein	Arnhem Centraal - Elst - Zetten-Andelst - Hemmen-Dodewaard - Opheusden - Kesteren - Tiel	Stadler GTW	1x per hour, 2x per hour at peak times	
31200	Arriva	Stoptrein	Zutphen - Lochem - Goor - Delden - Hengelo Gezondheidspark - Hengelo - Hengelo Oost - Oldenzaal	Lint 41 Stadler GTW	2x per hour	
31300	Keolis Nederland	Stoptrein	Amersfoort - Barneveld Noord - Barneveld Centrum - Barneveld Zuid - Lunteren - Ede Centrum - Ede-Wageningen	Protos, Keolis FLIRT	2x per hour	Branded RS 34 RRReis
31400	Keolis Nederland	Stoptrein	Amersfoort - Barneveld Noord - Barneveld Centrum - Barneveld Zuid	Protos, Keolis FLIRT	2x per hour	Branded RS 34 RRReis
32000	Arriva	Stoptrein	Maastricht Randwyck - Maastricht - Maastricht Noord - Meerssen - Houthem-Sint Gerlach - Valkenburg - Schin op Geul - Klimmen-Ransdaal - Voerendaal - Heerlen Woonboulevard - Heerlen	Arriva FLIRT	2x per hour	
32100	Arriva	Sneltrein	Maastricht - Meerssen - Valkenburg - Heerlen	Arriva FLIRT	2x per hour	
32200	Arriva	Stoptrein	Nijmegen - Nijmegen Heyendaal - Mook-Molenhoek - Cuijk - Boxmeer - Vierlingsbeek - Venray - Blerick - Venlo - Tegelen - Reuver - Swalmen - Roermond	Arriva FLIRT	2x per hour	
32300	Arriva	Stoptrein	Nijmegen - Nijmegen Heyendaal - Mook-Molenhoek - Cuijk - Boxmeer - Vierlingsbeek - Venray (- Blerick - Venlo)	Stadler GTW	2x per hour	Three early morning services from Venlo and three late evening services to Venlo. Does not operate on evenings and weekends
32400	Arriva	Sprinter	Roermond - Echt - Susteren - Sittard - Geleen-Lutterade - Beek-Elsloo - Bunde - Maastricht - Maastricht Randwyck	Stadler FLIRT	2x per hour	
32500	Arriva	Sprinter	Sittard - Geleen Oost - Spaubeek - Schinnen - Nuth - Hoensbroek - Heerlen - Heerlen de Kissel - Landgraaf - Eygelshoven - Chevremont - Kerkrade Centrum	Stadler GTW	2x per hour	
37000	Arriva	Stoptrein	Leeuwarden - Mantgum - Sneek Noord - Sneek	Stadler GTW	Weekdays: 2x per hour Saturdays: 1x per hour Sundays: 3x per day	
37100	Arriva	Stoptrein	Leeuwarden - Mantgum - Sneek Noord - Sneek - IJlst - Workum - Hindeloopen - Koudum-Molkwerum - Stavoren	Stadler GTW	1x per hour	
37200	Arriva	Stoptrein	Leeuwarden - Deinum - Dronryp - Franeker - Harlingen - Harlingen Haven	Stadler GTW	2x per hour	
37300	Arriva	Sneltrein	Groningen - Buitenpost - Leeuwarden	Stadler GTW	1x per hour	
37400	Arriva	Stoptrein	Groningen - Zuidhorn - Grijpskerk - Buitenpost - De Westereen - Feanwâlden - Hurdegaryp - Leeuwarden Camminghaburen - Leeuwarden	Stadler GTW	2x per hour (Sundays: 1x per hour)	Only 3 trains per day call at Leeuwarden Achter de Hoven
37500	Arriva	Stoptrein	Groningen - Groningen Europapark - Kropswolde - Martenshoek - Hoogezand-Sappemeer - Sappemeer Oost - Zuidbroek - Scheemda - Winschoten (- Bad Nieuweschans)	Stadler GTW	2x per hour (Sundays: 5x per day)	Bad Nieuweschans only served 1x per hour on evenings.
37600	Arriva	Stoptrein	Groningen - Groningen Noord - Sauwerd - Winsum - Baflo - Warffum - Usquert - Uithuizen - Uithuizermeeden - Roodeschool - Eemshaven	Stadler GTW	2x per hour (weekends: 1x per hour)	
37700	Arriva	Stoptrein	Groningen - Groningen Noord - Sauwerd - Bedum - Stedum - Loppersum - Appingedam - Delfzijl West - Delfzijl	Stadler GTW	2x per hour (weekends: 1x per hour)	
37800	Arriva	Stoptrein	Groningen - Groningen Europapark - Kropswolde - Martenshoek - Hoogezand-Sappemeer - Zuidbroek - Veendam	Stadler GTW	2x per hour (weekends: 1x per hour)	

== See also ==
- Train routes in the Netherlands
