= Leiden Lammenschans railway station =

Railway station in the Netherlands

Leiden Lammenschans
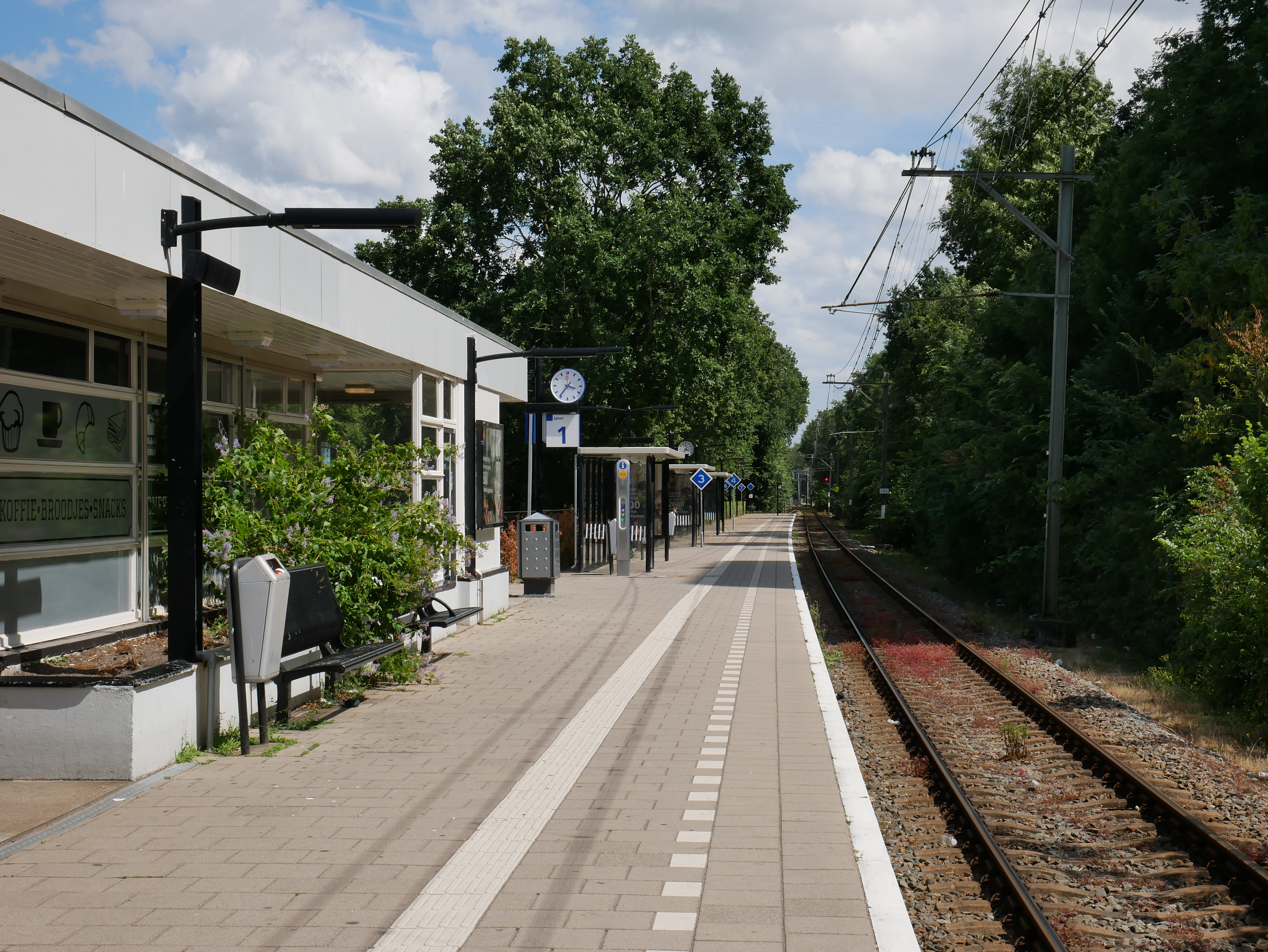

General information
- Location: Netherlands
- Coordinates: 52°08′50″N 4°29′30″E
- Operator: Nederlandse Spoorwegen
- Line: Woerden–Leiden railway
- Platforms: 1

Other information
- Station code: Ldl

History
- Opened: 1961

Services
Preceding station	Nederlandse Spoorwegen	Following station
Leiden Centraal Terminus	NS Sprinter 6700 After 18:00 and Fri-Sun	Alphen aan den Rijn towards Tiel
Leiden Centraal Terminus	NS Sprinter 8800 Mon-Thur until 18:00	Alphen aan den Rijn towards 's-Hertogenbosch
Leiden Centraal Terminus	NS Sprinter 8900 Peak only	Alphen aan den Rijn towards Utrecht Centraal
Location
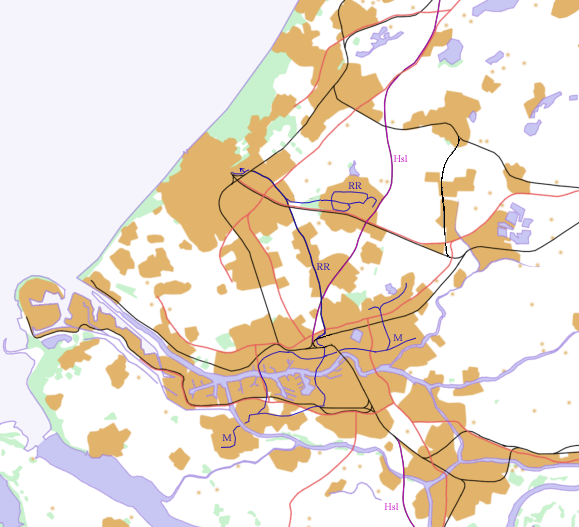
- Location within Southwest Randstad Location within Netherlands

Leiden Lammenschans is a railway station in Leiden, Netherlands. The station, designed by Koen van der Gaast, was opened on 18 May 1961. It is served by trains running between Leiden Centraal and Utrecht Centraal, and by RijnGouweLijn trains running between Leiden Centraal and Gouda at peak hours.

Leiden Lammenschans was named after the nearby fortification Schans Lammen, the encampment of the Spanish troops during the Siege of Leiden in 1573 and 1574.

== Train services ==
The following services call at Leiden Lammenschans:

- 2x per hour intercity service Leiden - Alphen aan den Rijn - Utrecht
- 2x per hour local service (sprinter) Leiden - Alphen aan den Rijn - Gouda (peak hours only)
