= Waddinxveen Triangel railway station =

Railway station in the Netherlands

Coordinates: 52°01′37″N 4°38′56″E

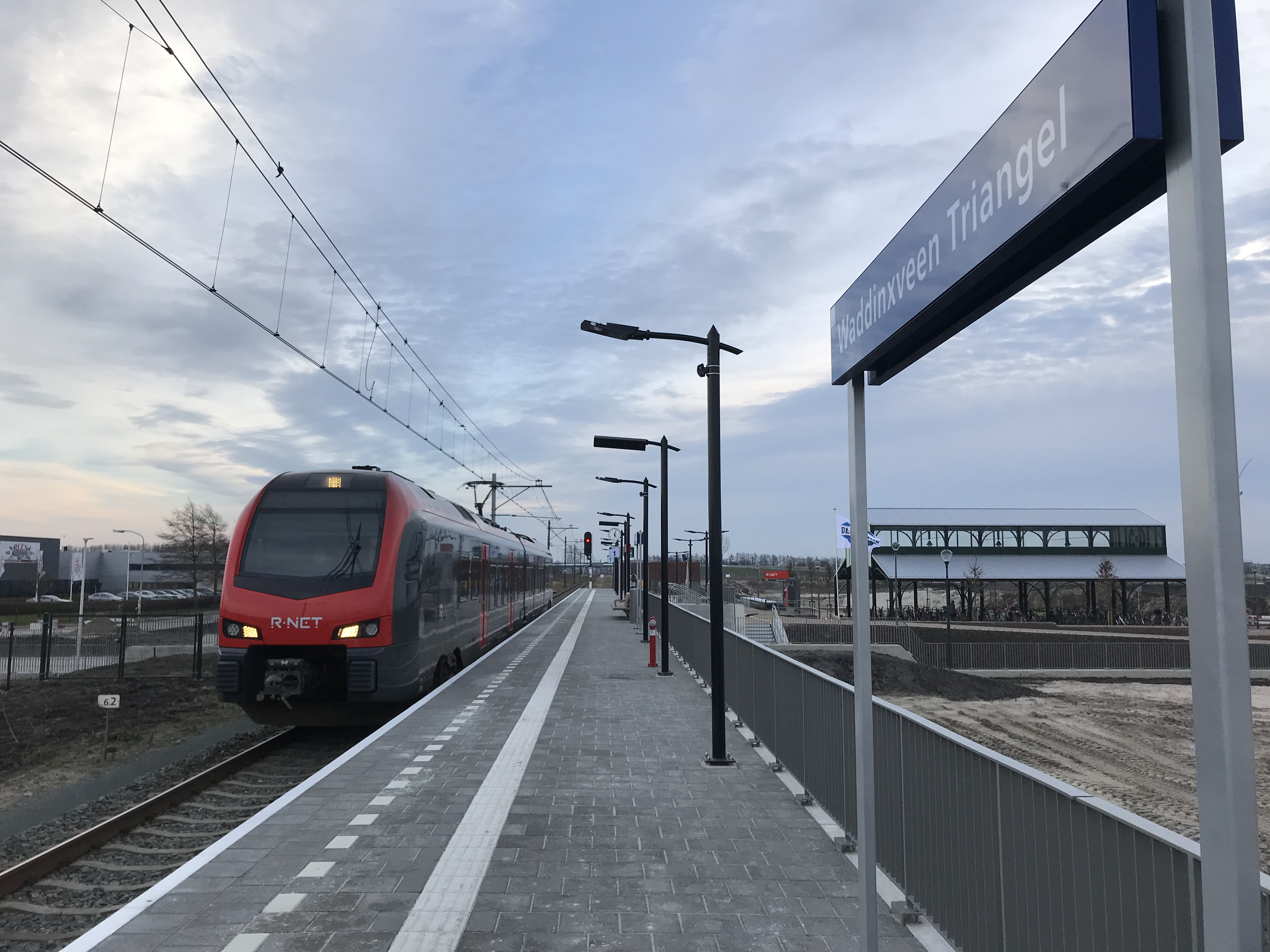
Waddinxveen Triangel in February 2018

Waddinxveen Triangel railway station is a railway station in Waddinxveen, South Holland, Netherlands that opened on 12 February 2018. It is situated on the Gouda–Alphen aan den Rijn railway, which connects Gouda and Alphen aan den Rijn, 1,5 kilometre south of Waddinxveen railway station. Trains running on the line are R-net Stadler FLIRTs.
