= Boskoop =

- Town and former municipality
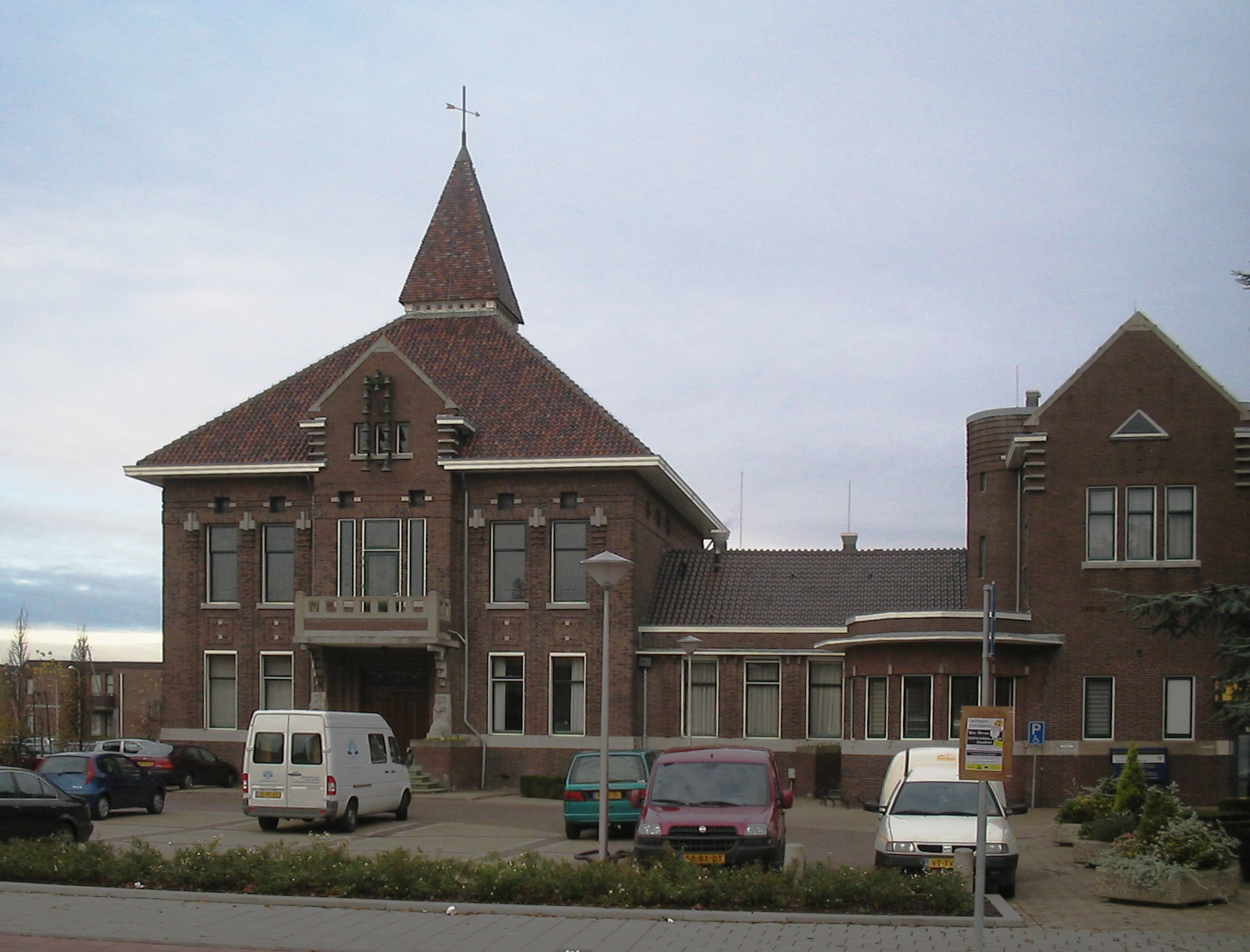
- Former Boskoop city hall

- Flag Coat of arms

- Location in the province of South Holland in the Netherlands Location in the Netherlands
- Coordinates: 52°4′N 4°39′E
- Country: Netherlands
- Province: South Holland
- Municipality: Alphen aan den Rijn

Area
  - Total: 7.29 km^{2} (2.81 sq mi)
  - Land: 5.91 km^{2} (2.28 sq mi)
  - Water: 1.39 km^{2} (0.54 sq mi)
- Elevation: −2 m (−6.6 ft)

Population (2021)
  - Total: 16,325
  - Density: 2,760/km^{2} (7,150/sq mi)
- Time zone: UTC+1 (CET)
  - Summer (DST): UTC+2 (CEST)
- Postcode: 2770–2771
- Area code: 0172

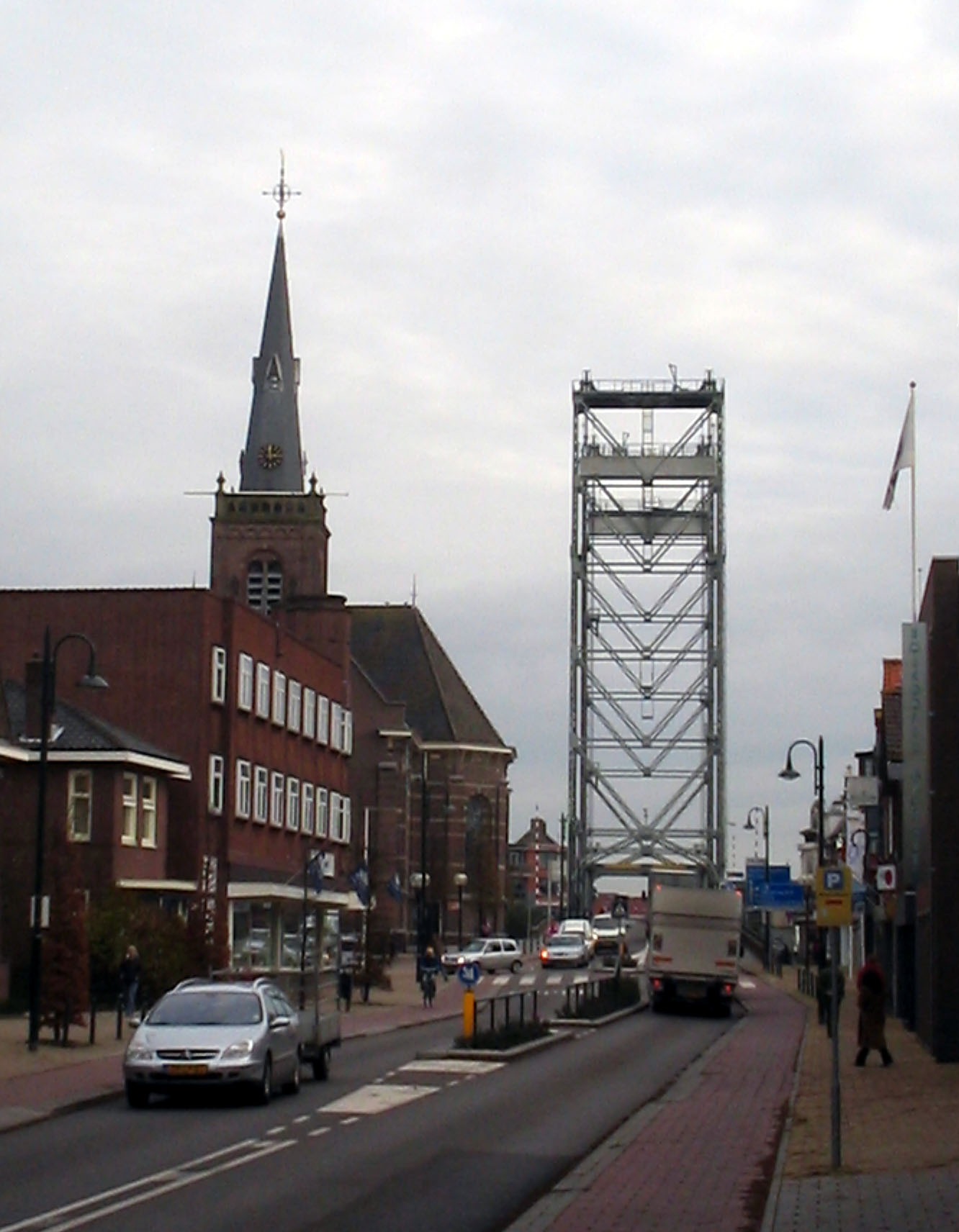
Centre of Boskoop.

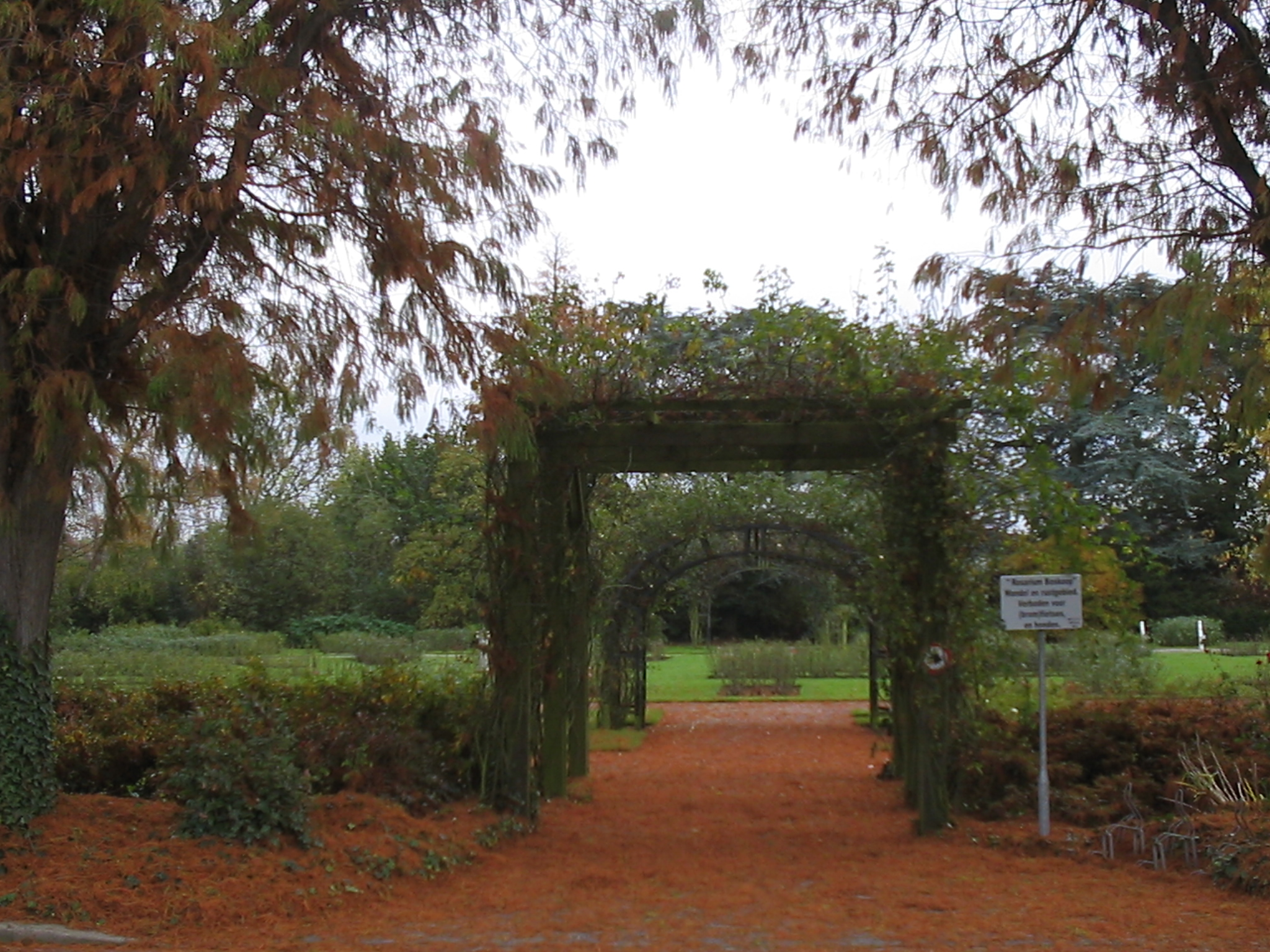
Rose Garden of Boskoop.

Boskoop (Dutch pronunciation: [ˈbɔskoːp]) is a town in the province of South Holland. It was a separate municipality until it merged into Alphen aan den Rijn in 2014. The town had a population of 15,050 in 2012 and covers an area of 7.29 km^{2} (2.81 sq mi) of which 1.39 km^{2} (0.54 sq mi) is water. It's the world's biggest joined floriculture area.

Boskoop is famous for its nurseries, particularly woody plant and perennial nurseries, of which some 774 are situated on long stretches of land, divided by narrow canals. Before World War II almost all transport was conducted using narrow boats. A few exceptionally high footbridges crossing some of the broader (main) canals remain from these days. Between the World Wars the transition was made from fruit culture to decorative garden plants and trees. As a source of technical knowledge about the art of growing decorative plants, Boskoop remains world-renowned and unique.

The name "Boskoop" has been given to an apple cultivar (Belle de Boskoop) which is widely distributed in the Low Countries, to a grape variety (Boskoop Glory) and also to a variety of Calluna (Boskoop) and Weigela (Boskoop Glory) and blackcurrant ("Boskoop Giant").

== Geography ==
Boskoop is located in the Green Heart (nl: Groene Hart) of the Randstad, spanning both sides of the river Gouwe between Alphen aan den Rijn (to the north) and Waddinxveen (to the south), both also along the river. The municipality is bordered in the east by Reeuwijk and Bodegraven, and in the west by Rijnwoude. A vertical-lift bridge in the centre of the village connects both shores of the Gouwe.

== History ==
It is assumed that Boskoop originated from the settlement Ten Bussche, founded by William I, Count of Holland, in 1204. In 1222, the Abbey of Rijnsburg became owner of Boskoop. The Abbey decided to enlarge its tree and shrub inventory by making the farmers grow more trees than they would need for their own orchards. From the 15th to the 17th century more and more trees were produced and decorative plants were introduced. At the end of the 19th century, Boskoop began with the export of its products, Germany being its first client.

The history of Boskoop was greatly influenced by its location on top of a thick peat layer. When the Abbey of Rijnsburg became owners of Boskoop, the harvesting of peat for fuel began. But unlike other towns in the "Green Heart" where extensive peat harvesting led to the formation of large ponds and lakes, Boskoop was too far from the major cities and peat harvesting was not profitable. Also the abbey did not permit the excavation of the peat layer on its lands. So Boskoop still has fertile soil for agriculture and horticulture.

An obstacle to the arboriculture was the high groundwater level, which was just below the surface at Boskoop. Many canals and ditches were dug to drain the rain waters, up to 2000 km at one point in its history. Consequently, much transportation was done by means of these waterways. By introducing new drainage methods which lowered the groundwater level, many ditches could be filled again. Yet at the beginning of the 21st century, there are still many canals in Boskoop on which many nurseries rely for transportation. As a result, Boskoop is sometimes called "Small Giethoorn". Nowadays, most plants are grown directly in pots, as opposed to open ground, and shipped to auction directly from the nursery. The viability of the nursery industry in Boskoop is also at risk, as nursery production has switched to container production, as opposed to field growing. The small size of the nurseries, the inability to mechanize, government regulations, the high cost of land, and the high cost of labor have all increased the economic pressure on the Boskoop nursery industry.

The municipality of Boskoop had been in financial straits for the several years, in part because of the high cost of maintaining the constantly sinking roads, before it was amalgamated into Alphen aan den Rijn. On 1 January 2014 the municipality was merged into Alphen aan den Rijn at the same time as Rijnwoude. When it was dissolved, the municipality had a population of 15,196 and a total area of 16.95 km^{2} (6.54 sq mi).

== Transport ==
Boskoop is served by Boskoop railway station, which is in the west part of town. In 2017, Boskoop Snijdelwijk railway station was opened. Boskoop is connected to the RijnGouweLijn, which runs from Alphen aan den Rijn to Gouda. Trains travel every thirty minutes in either direction. In peak hours, an additional two trains travel every hour in the directions of Gouda and Leiden.

== Attractions ==
The vertical-lift bridge at Boskoop is one of three similar bridges over the Gouwe; the other two are in Alphen aan den Rijn and Waddinxveen. Because of its central location, the bridge characterizes the village skyline. A new bicycle path was added to the bridge during its renovation at the beginning of the 1990s.

Another historic building is the (now partially dismantled) Water Tower of Boskoop. It is located on the north-west side of the village on the same road crossing the lift bridge.

Near the train station is an extensive rose garden (rosarium), with free access and open the whole year. More than 160 types of roses are exhibited here together with numerous other shrubs, trees, and plants.

In view of its history, it is not surprising Boskoop has a nursery museum. It is located in an old nursery residence from 1870. Behind the museum is another rose garden with rose varieties from the 17th to the 20th century.

From spring to fall, boat tours are organized through the many canals of Boskoop, which tour along the nurseries and nature areas and provide information about the history and surroundings of Boskoop. And once per year, a nursery canoe tour is organized.
