= Bodegraven railway station =

Railway station in the Netherlands

Bodegraven
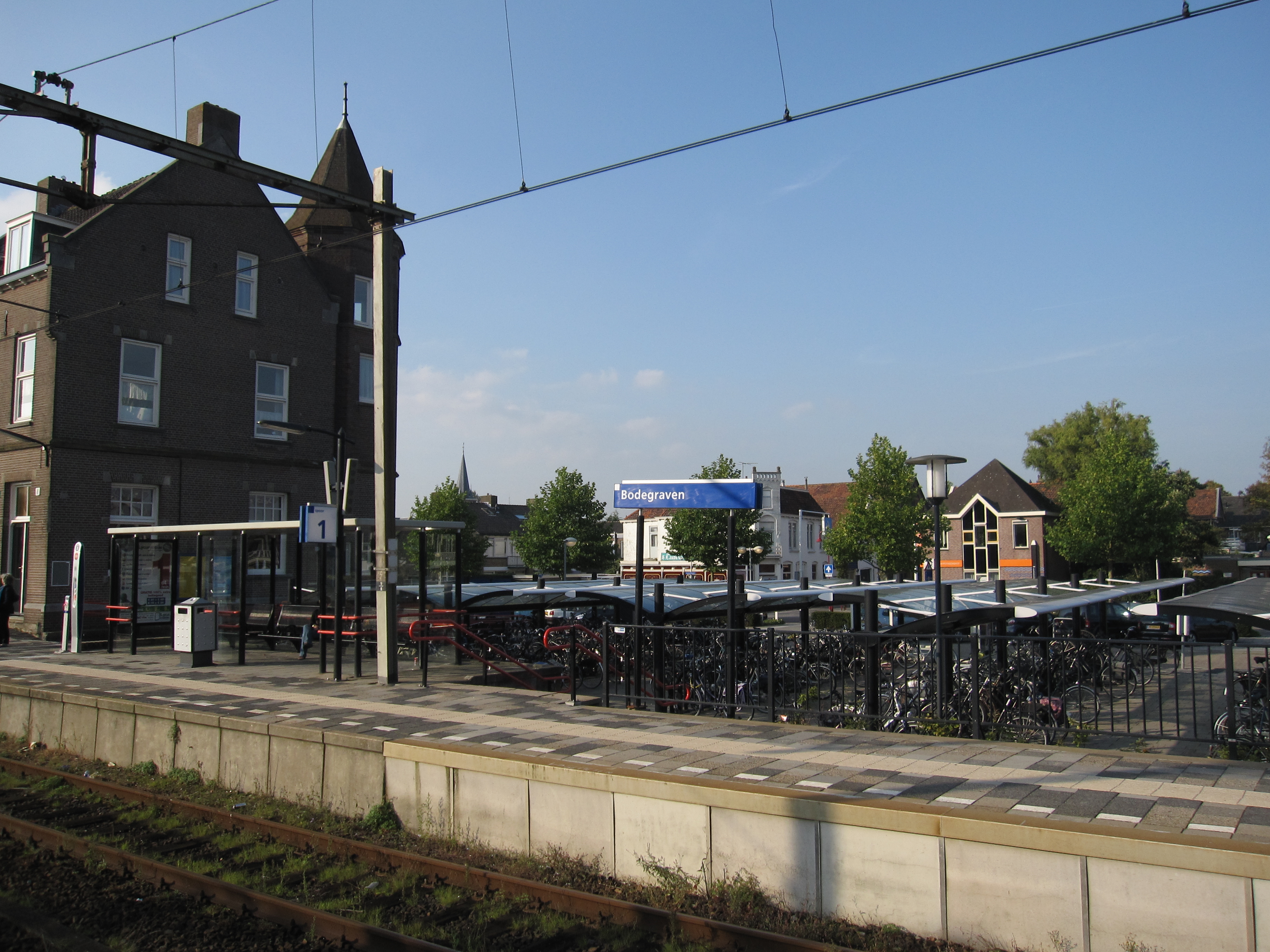

General information
- Location: Netherlands
- Coordinates: 52°4′55″N 4°44′44″E
- Operator: Nederlandse Spoorwegen
- Line: Woerden–Leiden railway
- Platforms: 2

Other information
- Station code: Bdg

History
- Opened: 1878, 1913 (rebuilt)

Services
Preceding station	Nederlandse Spoorwegen	Following station
Alphen aan den Rijn towards Leiden Centraal	NS Sprinter 6700 After 18:00 and Fri-Sun	Woerden towards Tiel
Alphen aan den Rijn towards Leiden Centraal	NS Sprinter 8800 Mon-Thur until 18:00	Woerden towards 's-Hertogenbosch
Alphen aan den Rijn towards Leiden Centraal	NS Sprinter 8900 Peak only	Woerden towards Utrecht Centraal
Location
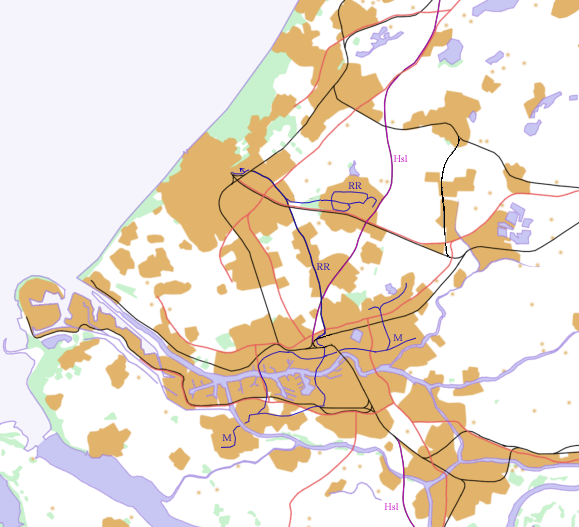
- Location within Southwest Randstad Location within Netherlands

Bodegraven is a railway station in Bodegraven, Netherlands. The railway station was opened in 1878, when the rail connection between Leiden and Utrecht was opened. The first station building had to be demolished in 1894 as a result of subsidence. The second building was destroyed in a fire in 1911. The current station was built in 1913.

The train service at this station received modern double decker units in 2007, previously being Old stock from the 1960s.

== Train services ==
The following services call at Bodegraven:

- 2x per hour intercity service Leiden - Alphen aan den Rijn - Utrecht
