= Gouda Goverwelle railway station =

Railway station in the Netherlands

Gouda Goverwelle
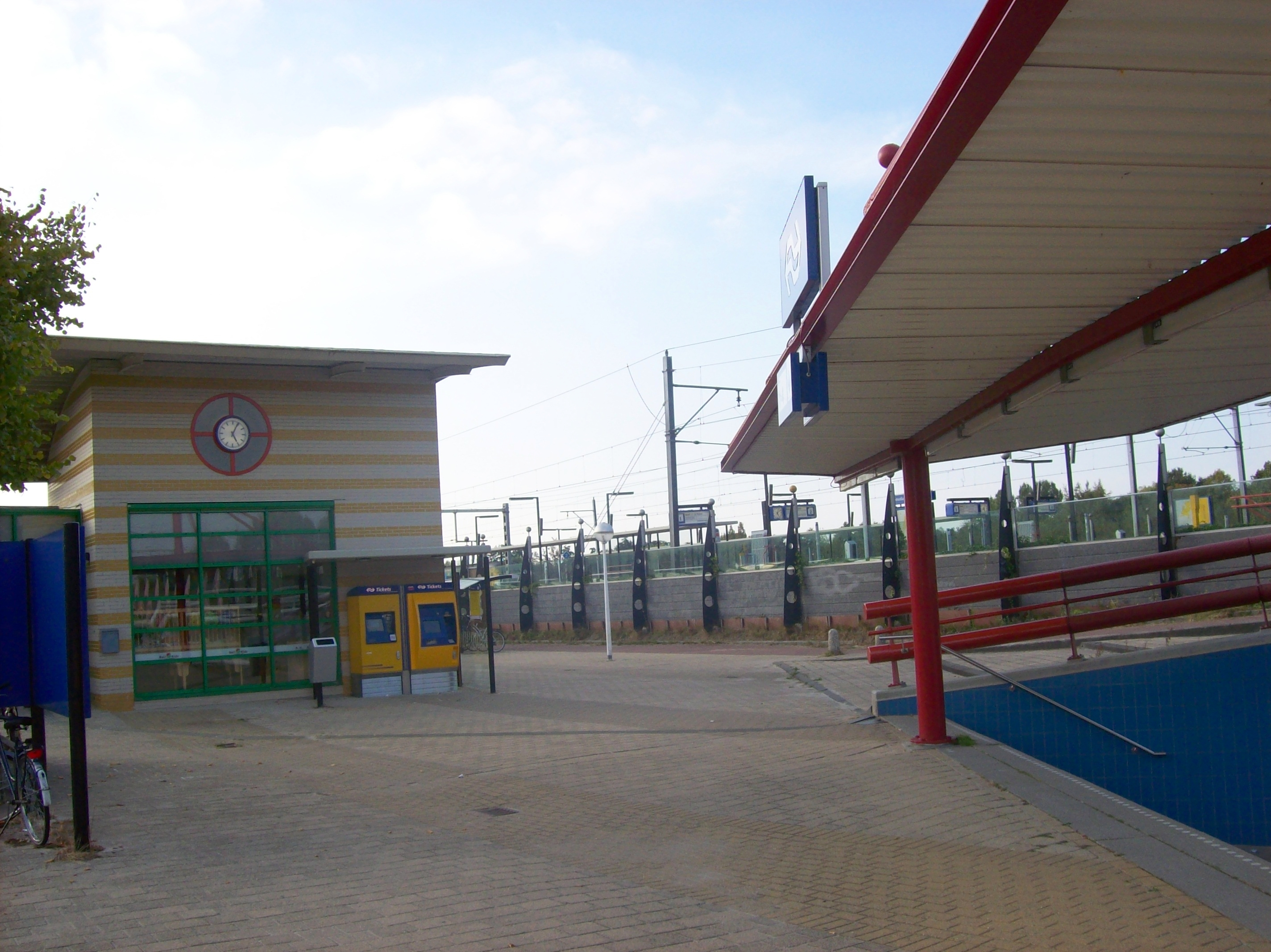

General information
- Location: Goverwelle, Gouda; Netherlands
- Coordinates: 52°00′54″N 4°44′30″E
- Operator: Nederlandse Spoorwegen
- Line: Utrecht–Rotterdam railway
- Platforms: 4

Other information
- Station code: Gdg

History
- Opened: 1993

Services
Preceding station	Nederlandse Spoorwegen	Following station
Gouda towards Rotterdam Centraal	NS Sprinter 4000	Woerden towards Uitgeest
Gouda towards Den Haag Centraal	NS Sprinter 6000 After 18:00 and Fri-Sun	Woerden towards 's-Hertogenbosch
Gouda towards Den Haag Centraal	NS Sprinter 6800	Terminus
Gouda towards Den Haag Centraal	NS Sprinter 6900 Mon-Thur until 18:00	Woerden towards Tiel
Location
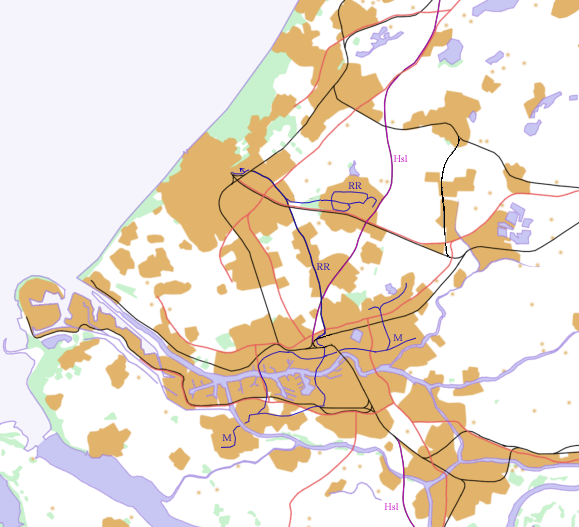
- Location within Southwest Randstad Location within Netherlands

Gouda Goverwelle is a railway station located on the Utrecht–Rotterdam railway in the Goverwelle area of Gouda in the Netherlands. The railway station, which opened in 1993, consists of two island platforms.

== Train services ==
The following services call at Gouda Goverwelle:

- 2x per hour local service (sprinter) Uitgeest - Amsterdam - Woerden - Rotterdam
- 2x per hour local service (sprinter) Rotterdam - Gouda Goverwelle
- 2x per hour local service (sprinter) The Hague - Gouda - Utrecht
- 2x per hour local service (stoptrein) The Hague - Gouda Goverwelle
