= Woerden railway station =

Railway station in the Netherlands

Woerden
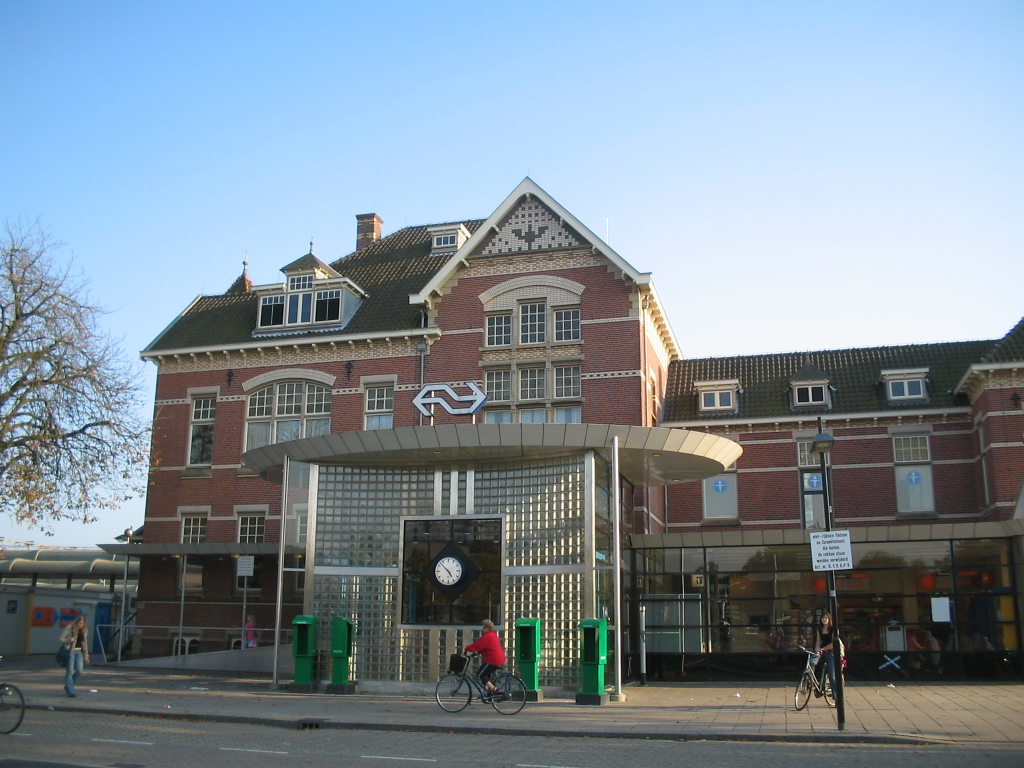

General information
- Location: Netherlands
- Coordinates: 52°5′5″N 4°53′35″E
- Lines: Utrecht–Rotterdam railway Woerden–Leiden railway

History
- Opened: 21 May 1855

Services
Preceding station	Nederlandse Spoorwegen	Following station
Gouda Goverwelle towards Rotterdam Centraal	NS Sprinter 4000	Breukelen towards Uitgeest
Gouda Goverwelle towards Den Haag Centraal	NS Sprinter 6000 After 18:00 and Fri-Sun	Vleuten towards 's-Hertogenbosch
Bodegraven towards Leiden Centraal	NS Sprinter 6700 After 18:00 and Fri-Sun	Utrecht Centraal towards Tiel
Gouda Goverwelle towards Den Haag Centraal	NS Sprinter 6900 Mon-Thur until 18:00	Vleuten towards Tiel
Bodegraven towards Leiden Centraal	NS Sprinter 8800 Mon-Thur until 18:00	Utrecht Centraal towards 's-Hertogenbosch
Terminus	NS Sprinter 8900 Mon-Fri midday	Vleuten towards Utrecht Centraal
Bodegraven towards Leiden Centraal	NS Sprinter 8900 Mon-Fri Peak	Vleuten towards Utrecht Centraal
Location
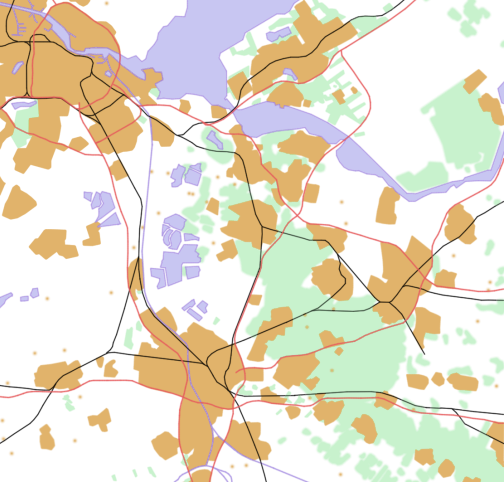
- Location within Northeastern Randstad

Woerden railway station (Dutch: Station Woerden) is the railway station of Woerden, Netherlands. The railway station was opened on 21 May 1855 on the Utrecht–Rotterdam railway. In 1911 a new building was built in Jugendstil. During 1993-1996 the railway station was modernised, replacing the wooden roof and stairways by modern ones, while maintaining the Jugendstil building.

During the closing decades of the twentieth century growing numbers of stopping trains at the station and a sustained rise in the level of motorised traffic led to increasing delays both for cyclists and for motorists at the level crossing directly adjacent to the station on its western side. The matter was finally addressed early in the twenty-first century with the construction of a short section of a road tunnel under the railway lines: this replaced the old level crossing.

The station has two platforms and two entrances. On every entrance, there is bicycle parking.

== Train services ==
The following services call at Woerden:

- 2x per hour intercity service Leiden - Alphen aan den Rijn - Utrecht
- 2x per hour local service (sprinter) Uitgeest - Amsterdam - Woerden - Gouda - Rotterdam
- 2x per hour local service (sprinter) The Hague - Gouda- Woerden - Utrecht - Houten - Geldermalsen - Den Bosch
- 2x per hour local service (sprinter) Woerden - Utrecht - Houten - Tiel

== Accidents ==
=== Woerden train accident ===
Near the station a British furlough train derailed on 21 November 1960 killing 2 people and 10 people were injured.

=== Harmelen train disaster ===
Near the station the worst railway accident in the history of the Netherlands took place on 8 January 1962, killing 93 people.
