= Boskoop Glory =

Variety of grape

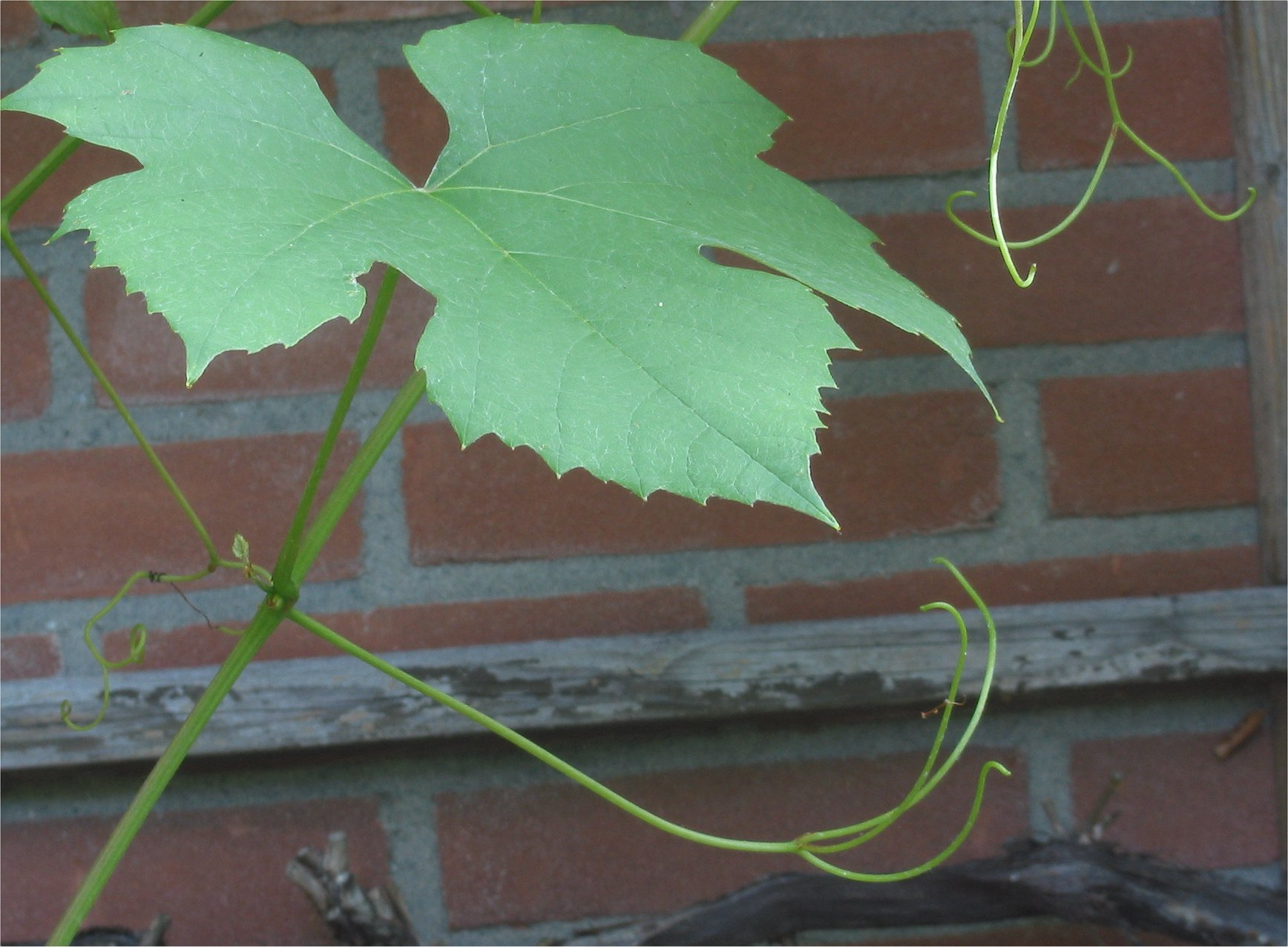
Boskoop Glory

Boskoop glory is a disease-resistant, cold-tolerant grape variety from the Netherlands. It is thought to be a hybrid between Vitis vinifera and Vitis labrusca. It was developed in the 1950s at Wageningen where American vines had been planted. It is therefore assumed to be a spontaneous crossing of two species from the vineyard. This variety usually ripens fruit in late August or early September and is resistant to fungal diseases and frost.

It is a popular table grape in the Netherlands and it is popular among gardeners in the Netherlands, England, Germany and much of Northern Europe. The plant produces sweet, aromatic and juicy grapes.
