= Gouwe (river) =

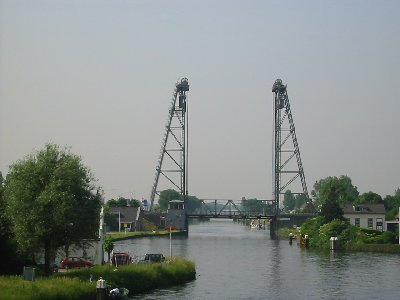
- Vertical lift bridge over the river Gouwe at Alphen aan den Rijn

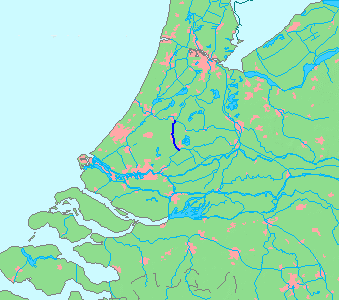
- Location of the Gouwe in dark blue.

Location
- Country: The Netherlands
- State: South Holland

Physical characteristics
- Source: Oude Rijn
  - location: Alphen aan den Rijn, South Holland
  - coordinates: 52°07′07″N 4°40′28″E
- Mouth: Hollandse IJssel
  - location: Gouda, South Holland
  - coordinates: 51°59′50″N 4°41′28″E
- Length: 14 km (8.7 mi)

The Gouwe is a channelized river in South Holland, the Netherlands. It runs from north to south - from the Oude Rijn to the Hollandse IJssel.

== Flow ==
From Alphen aan den Rijn, where the Gouwe begins, it flows through Boskoop and Waddinxveen to Gouda. Here it splits into the old stream (which runs through the city of Gouda) and into the Gouwekanaal on the city's west side. Both branches connect with the Hollandse IJssel on the southern outskirts of Gouda.

== History ==
The Gouwe was formed around 1222 as a reservoir for the adjacent polders, this was needed as peat excavation led to a stream of peat going southward towards the Hollandse IJssel. A second part was then dug towards the Oude Rijn. With time the river also became important for shipping. This made Gouda an important city for shipping and one of the most affluent in Holland. The Gouwe was historically part of the primary (and prescribed) shipping-route in Holland, connecting Dordrecht in the south with Haarlem and - later on - with Amsterdam to the north. These cities, together with the Counts of Holland who collected tolls at Gouda and at Spaarndam, maintained this arrangement - to the dissatisfaction of the cities of Delft and Leiden, which this route bypassed.

Today the Gouwe remains an important shipping-route. At the Oude Rijn, river travel can be continued north over the Aar Canal. It also functions as the main water outlet for the Rijnland region.

== Sights ==
Three striking vertical lift bridges cross the Gouwe at Alphen aan den Rijn, Boskoop, and Waddinxveen.
