= Alphen aan den Rijn railway station =

Railway station in the Netherlands

Alphen a/d Rijn
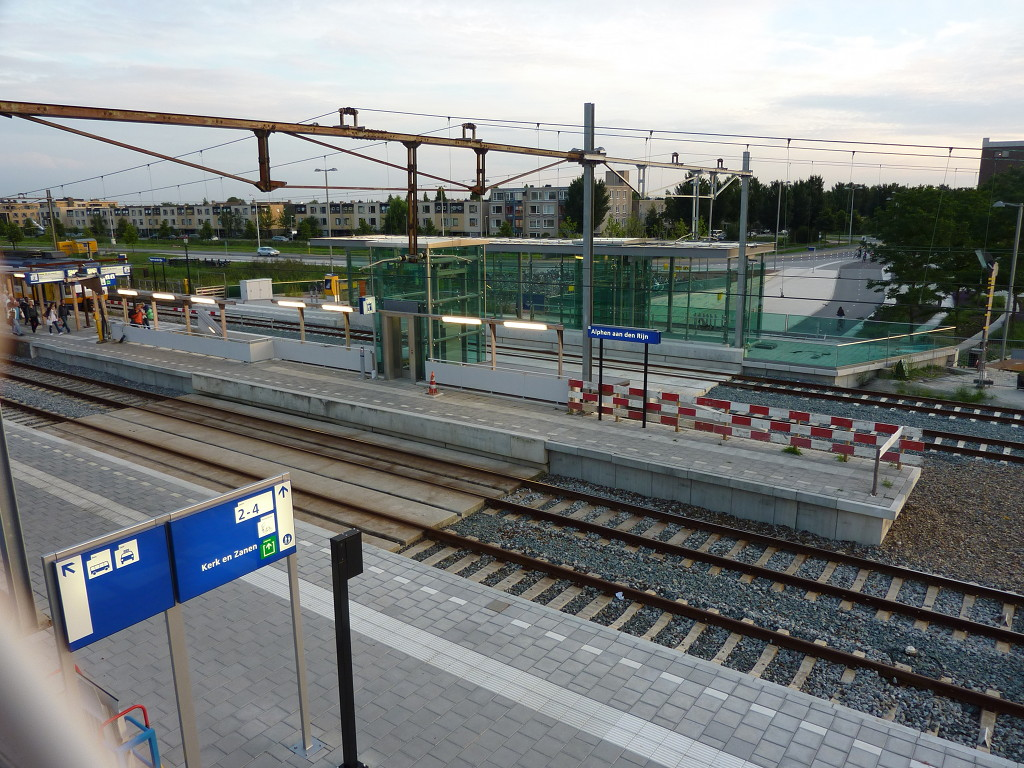

General information
- Location: Netherlands
- Coordinates: 52°07′28″N 4°39′27″E
- Operator: Nederlandse Spoorwegen
- Lines: Woerden–Leiden railway Gouda–Alphen aan den Rijn railway
- Platforms: 3

Other information
- Station code: Apn

History
- Opened: 1878

Services
Preceding station	Nederlandse Spoorwegen	Following station
Leiden Lammenschans towards Leiden Centraal	NS Sprinter 6700 After 18:00 and Fri-Sun	Bodegraven towards Tiel
Terminus	NS Sprinter 8600	Boskoop towards Gouda
Terminus	NS Sprinter 8700	Boskoop towards Gouda
Leiden Lammenschans towards Leiden Centraal	NS Sprinter 8800 Mon-Thur until 18:00	Bodegraven towards 's-Hertogenbosch
Leiden Lammenschans towards Leiden Centraal	NS Sprinter 8900 Peak only	Bodegraven towards Utrecht Centraal
Location
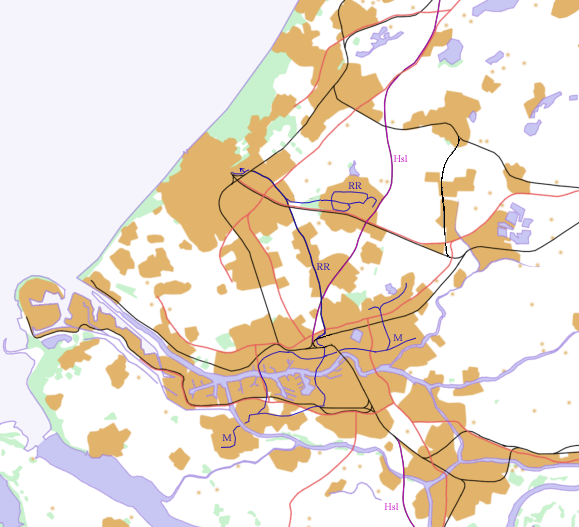
- Location within Southwest Randstad Location within Netherlands

Alphen a/d Rijn railway station is a railway station in Alphen aan den Rijn, Netherlands.

== History ==
The railway station was opened in 1878, as part of a railway connection between Leiden and Woerden. A connection between Alphen aan den Rijn and Uithoorn was opened in 1915.

The line was extended to Gouda in 1932, but the connection between Alphen aan den Rijn and Uithoorn was closed in 1936.

The railway station was renovated for the RijnGouweLijn from Gouda in 2004, involving the construction of an additional platform.

In 2007 a major redesign of the railway station and its surrounding area started. The original railway station building (built in 1878) was demolished to make room for a tunnel underneath the railway and a bike storage facility. The new tunnel links the old town centre with the new district "Kerk en Zanen", which used to be separated from the town centre by the railway. The tunnel and bike storage facility opened in mid 2010.

== Train services ==
The following services call at Alphen a/d Rijn:

- NS Intercity services Leiden - Alphen aan den Rijn - Woerden - Utrecht
- R-net local services (Sprinter) Alphen aan den Rijn - Gouda

== Bus services ==
- 1 (Station - De Aarhof - Ridderhof - Haagwinde - Rijsenburg - Busstation Herenhof - Ijzerweg - Eisenhowerlaan - Station)
- 2 (Station - Eisenhowerlaan - Ijzweg - Busstation Herenhof - Rijsenburg - Haagwinde - Ridderhof - De Aarhof - Station)
- 3 (Station - Europalaan - Amerikaweg - Albert Einsteinweg - Ondernemingsweg - Station)
- 4 (Station - Ondernemingsweg - Albert Einsteinweg - Amerikaweg - Europalaan - Station)
- 147 (Station - De Aarhof - Rijnbrug - Aarlanderveen - Nieuwkoop - Zevenhoven - Nieuwveen - Vrouwenakker - De Kwakel - Uithoorn, Busstation)
- 165 (Station - Hazerwoude Rijndijk - Hazerwoude - Benthuizen - Willem Dreeslaan RR - Palenstein RR - Zoetermeer, Centrum West RR)
- 169 (Station - De Aarhof - Ridderhof - Rijnland Hospital - Koudekerk aan den Rijn - Hazerwoude Rijndijk - Zoeterwoude Rijndijk - Leiden, Centraal Station)
- 182 (Station - Eisenhowerlaan - Ter Aar - Woubrugge - Hoogmade - Leiderdorp - Leiden, Centraal Station)
- 249 (Station - Rijsenburg - Woubrugge - Hoogmade - Leiderdorp - Leiden)
- 370 (Station - Eisenhowerlaan - De Hoek (Change for Hoofddorp) - Amsterdam Airport Schiphol)
