= RijnGouweLijn =

Proposed rail project in the Netherlands

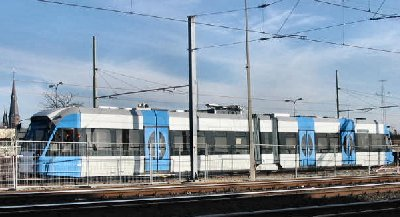
- Light rail train

Technical
- Track gauge: 1,435 mm (4 ft 8 1/2 in)
- Minimum radius: (?)

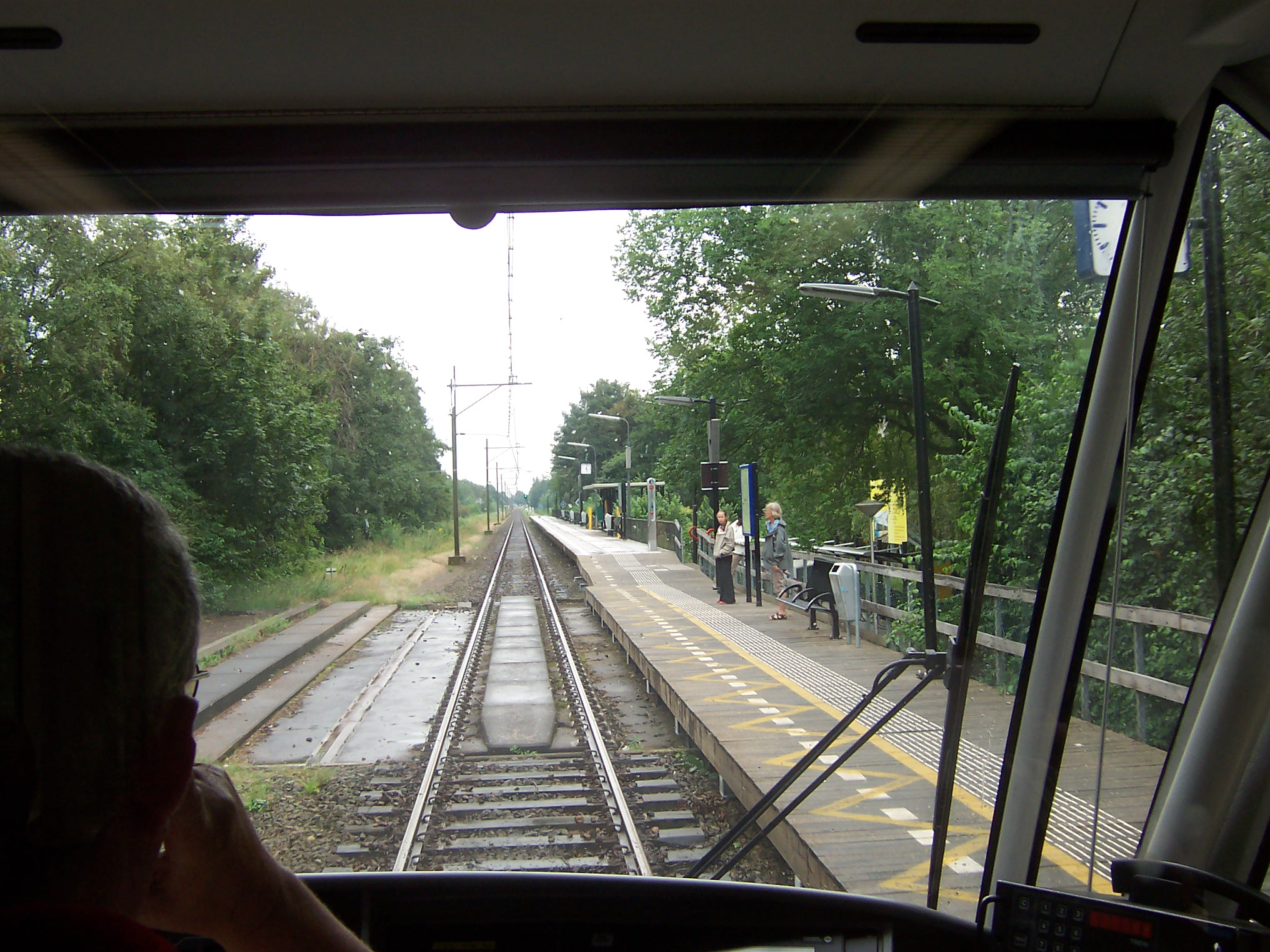
Station showing high and low level platforms, viewed through cab of train

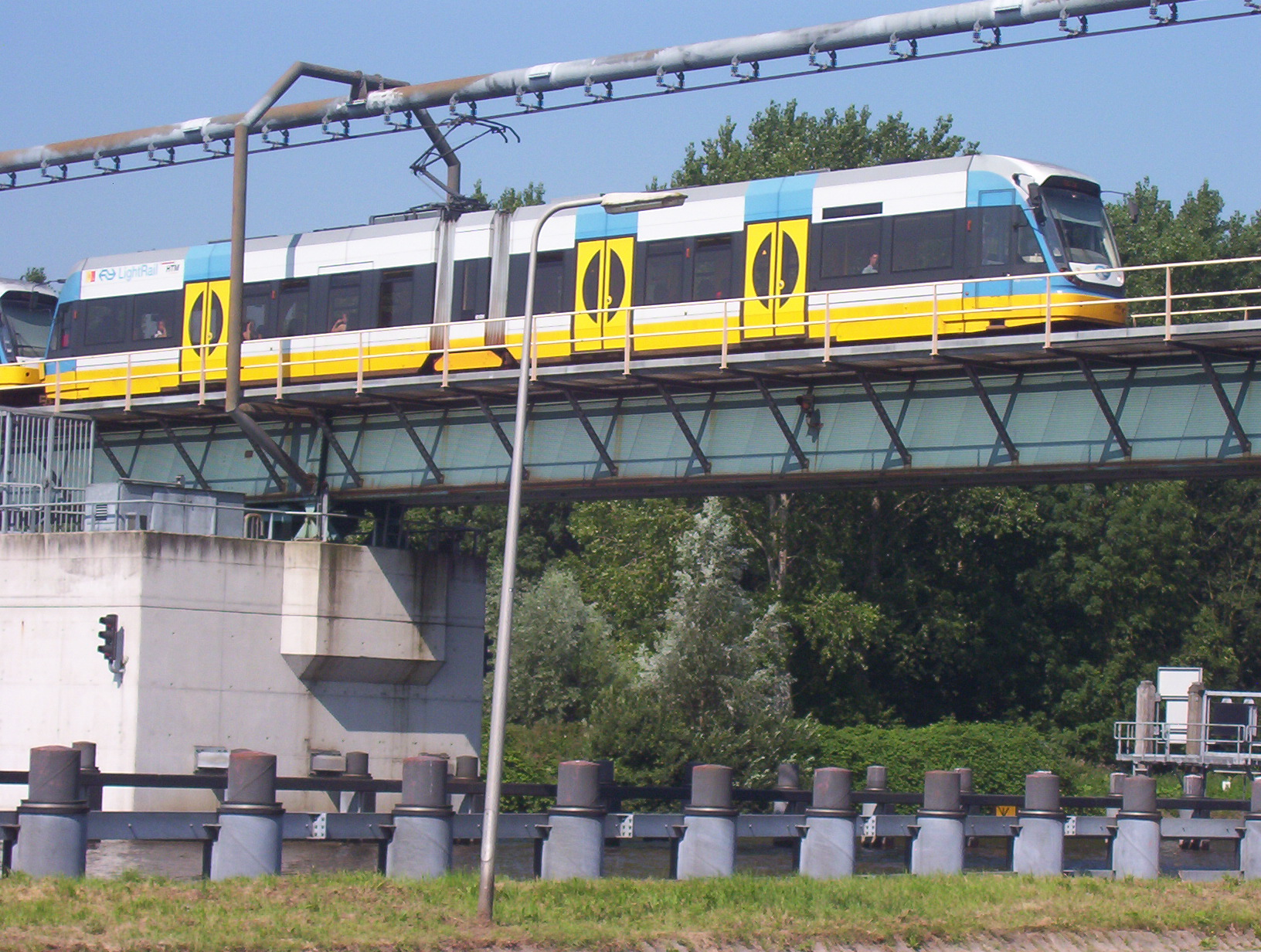
Light rail train at the swingbridge across the Gouwe river

The RijnGouweLijn (English: The Rhine-Gouwe Line), or RGL, was a proposed light rail project in South Holland, Netherlands, that used some new tracks and some existing tracks from the Gouda–Alphen aan den Rijn railway and the Woerden–Leiden railway. However, the new section might have used bus rapid transit (BRT) instead.

From 2003 to 2009, light rail vehicles operated on the Gouda–Alphen aan den Rijn railway, sharing these tracks with regular NS stock. As of 2013, only NS stock is used on the railway.

== Original plan ==
The RGL would have been the first system in the Netherlands where light rail vehicles shared heavy rail tracks with heavy rail trains, similar to the tram-train systems around Karlsruhe and Saarbrücken, Germany. This shared track runs from Gouda through Alphen aan den Rijn to Leiden. The existing heavy rail track was to be adapted and seven additional stops added.

For Leiden, the plan was to have new track through the centre (Breestraat) at street level (alternatives that were proposed were around the centre on existing track, or in a tunnel through the centre). The province of South Holland was in favour of this, but based on a referendum in March 2007 among the Leiden population, the municipality was against it. The province threatened to force the municipality to accept a trajectory through Leiden. Following that, the municipality agreed to accept the RGL through the city. The province and municipality then agreed that the route would follow Hooigracht and Langegracht.

The proposed line passed through Leiden Centraal railway station and then used the new tracks to Katwijk with a branch to Noordwijk.

The light-rail vehicles used were of the Bombardier Flexity Swift model, produced in Vienna. The usage of the designation A32 is originally from SL in Stockholm, Sweden.

In the beginning, they were used on the regular railway service between Gouda and Alphen aan den Rijn. The stations were adapted by adding new low-level platforms, either as extensions to existing high-level platforms or by building them on the opposite side of the track to the high-level platforms.

From 2003 to 2009, there was test traffic with light rail vehicles on the heavy rail track from Gouda to Alphen aan den Rijn. The RGL was divided into two sub-projects: RGL-East (Gouda-Leiden Transferium 't Schouw A44) and RGL-West (Leiden Transferium 't Schouw A44-Katwijk/Noordwijk), both of which were due for completion in late 2015. Completion depended on financial support from the national government, and in the autumn of 2009, State Secretary of Transport Tineke Huizinga indicated that the line to Katwijk would cost €45 million. The line to Noordwijk was to be served by buses in the meantime.

=== Background ===
Long before there was light rail, some of the tracks had tram traffic. In the 1960s, Leiden had the Blue and Yellow Tram lines.

In the 1960s, 70s and 80s plan were often put forward for the tram to return to the previous sections of the Blue and Yellow Tram. The first ideas for the RGL were presented in the early 90s by Boudewijn Leeuwenburgh, the former district chief of NZH. The tram system was initially intended to be a much larger light rail network, with branches to Leiderdorp, the district of Ridderveld in Alphen and Schiphol. There were also suggestions to link the RGL to Randstadrail, for example by establishing the trajectory of Leiden-Zoetermeer and/or Leiden-Leidschendam-Voorburg via Voorschoten. None of the ideas have been implemented.

People soon began to oppose the RGL. Tram traffic was seen as a hazard for cyclists and pedestrians. There was also criticism of the high construction cost of the project. In the 90s it was budgeted for 450 million guilders (€222 million), but by 2007 the amount had risen to €470 million. There were fears of cuts in city and regional bus networks. Furthermore, there was doubt about the effectiveness of the RGL. The critics were in favour of extending the rail line from Leiden to Utrecht, and investment in dedicated bus lanes on the route from Leiden to Katwijk and Noordwijk.

=== Ridership ===
In the 1990s, it was projected that approximately 78,000 passengers a day would use the RGL (total number for the system Gouda-Katwijk/Noordwijk). Despite the negative impact on the bus network in favor of the RGL, it was expected that the accessibility of central Leiden would be greatly improved. A track through the centre of Leiden would mean that the travel time for people who have a destination outside Leiden would be significantly longer, and this course had repercussions for the passenger forecast. These estimates were repeatedly reduced. The most recent forecasts a ridership of 50,000 passengers — 42,000 more than in the busiest tram line in Amsterdam (number 5). On the route Leiden-Katwijk/Noordwijk the number of passengers would only be slightly higher than on the current bus network.

=== Eastern section (Gouda - Alphen aan den Rijn - Leiden) ===
The section between Gouda and Leiden was originally scheduled to be inaugurated in 2005. This was later postponed to 2007 and later to 2015, simultaneously with western section. From 2003 to 2009, light rail vehicles were used on the existing railway between Gouda and Alphen aan den Rijn. The future RGL would then continue to Leiden Lammenschans railway station. In the period 2012-2014, the whole section would be upgraded to double track.

=== Through Leiden ===
The original plan was that the RGL should continue from Leiden Lammenschans railway station as a city tram to Leiden Central Station. This process was controversial, especially regarding safety, cost and impact on cyclists and the bus network. Especially controversial was a single track section through the Breestraat. Therefore, in addition to the original plan several alternative plans were developed. In one of those alternatives the RGL would follow the existing route of the railway line all the way to Leiden Centraal, or to a point near the station. The railway would be doubled, and perhaps be moved to a concrete overpass above the current track.

These alternative plans were shown to be three to four times more expensive than the originally proposed route through the city centre. On 7 March 2007, a referendum was held in Leiden, on the arrival of the RGL to Leiden (a specific route was not mentioned in the referendum question). 69% of the Leiden inhabitants voted 'no' to the proposal. Accordingly, the town rejected the RGL, but the province threatened to impose the tram line anyway. This led a majority of the politicians in Leiden to accept, in 2008, an alternative route of the RGL, through Hooigracht/Langegracht.

Whereas the tram in the initial proposal would go through Steenstraat/3e Binnenvestgracht Stationsweg to the station, it was to go through the Lammermarkt and Schuttersveld. According to the last urban vision, the tram would cross the railway in the Rijnsbruger Tunnel instead of the Joop Walenkamp tunnel, implying the removal of the bicycle lane and taxi stop. After Leiden Centraal station, the line would pass the Leiden University Medical Center and the Bio Science Park, reaching Transferium 't Schouw.

=== Western section (Leiden - Katwijk / Noordwijk) ===
From Transferium 't Schouw A44, the RGL would go as light rail to Katwijk aan den Rijn, then fork into branches to Katwijk aan Zee and Noordwijk respectively. In 2005, an agreement was signed between all municipalities except the municipality of Leiden to share the costs of the project, with the national government and province covering a large part of the construction cost, and the county bearing all risks for the operation of the line. The western branch of the RGL was also important for the opening of the new building located on the former Valkenburg Naval Air Base.

In Katwijk and Noordwijk there was much opposition to the tram plans, both among the general population and in the town councils. Neither community wanted tram traffic in the town centres. For Noordwijk it would end at the European Space Research and Technology Centre on the border with Katwijk. The municipalities presented an alternative alignment of the RGL. The RGL Noordwijk-Binnen would run to Voorhout station and the NS station at Sassenheim. In Katwijk there was opposition against the branch to Katwijk aan Zee. In both communities the tram line would have to be imposed by the provincial government, as had happened earlier in Leiden. In the autumn of 2009 the national government provided €45 million for the line to Katwijk, but not to Noordwijk. There is a gap of €55 million, for which a solution had to be found.

In June 2009, a preferred route was approved by the Provincial Council of South Holland. Both Katwijk and Noordwijk got a tram to the coast. However, the province addressed the concerns of Katwijk and routed the line not on the Boulevard but to finish in Badstraat.

=== Test traffic with light rail vehicles ===
In March 2003, test traffic was started between Gouda and Alphen aan den Rijn with light rail equipment on existing rail tracks, largely using RGL vehicles. These were Bombardier A32s, a model that is also used on the Tvärbanan light rail line in Stockholm. The grey and blue trams were fitted with yellow stickers to resemble NS "Sprinter" trains. On 13 December 2009, the trial ended and "Sprinter" trains took over the line. The A32 trams were sold to Stockholm.

==== Lower platforms ====
In North Waddinxveen the existing platform was extended with a low wooden platform. At Boskoop the island platform was considerably extended and this is the only concrete platform apart from the platform at Gouda. In Alphen aan den Rijn a new 4LR wooden platform was built along the old freight track. There is a fence between the two separate tracks, to improve driver safety as the cab door opens directly onto the track, not on the platform.

Because the trains are wider than the A32 trams, extra warning stripes were placed along the platforms to warn passengers of the height/width difference in alighting and boarding.

The operation suffered from frequent signal interference caused by malfunctioning axle counters and/or ATP-NG-train security. Soon the RGL got a bad reputation because of the cancellation of a large number of journeys. However the number of passengers per day, around 5,000, during the period 2003-2009 was stable, despite a large increase in many other rail routes in the Randstad. The six light rail vehicles purchased for the test eventually proved inadequate, also because of the large number of problems they faced.

==== End of test ====
In August 2009, it was announced that the proposed precursor of the RGL on the Gouda-Alphen route would disappear as of 13 December 2009, because using only Sprinter the train timetables could be improved. A more direct train service between Gouda and Leiden Centraal was introduced, decreasing the travel time by 8 minutes.

=== Future ===
With the route through the Hooigracht/Langegracht in Leiden decided (2008), and the decision of the provincial government on the western route, the future of the RGL was a little clearer, but that did not mean that all obstacles have been overcome. The municipality of Noordwijk refused to cooperate and several parties in the city council of Leiden remained fiercely opposed to the RGL (including D66 and SP, never strong supporters of the RGL).

=== End of the RGL ===
On Wednesday 30 January 2013, the provincial government chose to stop this version of the RGL project. Instead, there were to be more trains, stations and buses.

== See also ==
- Gouda
- Alphen aan den Rijn
- Leiden
- Katwijk
- RandstadRail
