= Gouda railway station =

Railway station in Gouda, Netherlands

Gouda
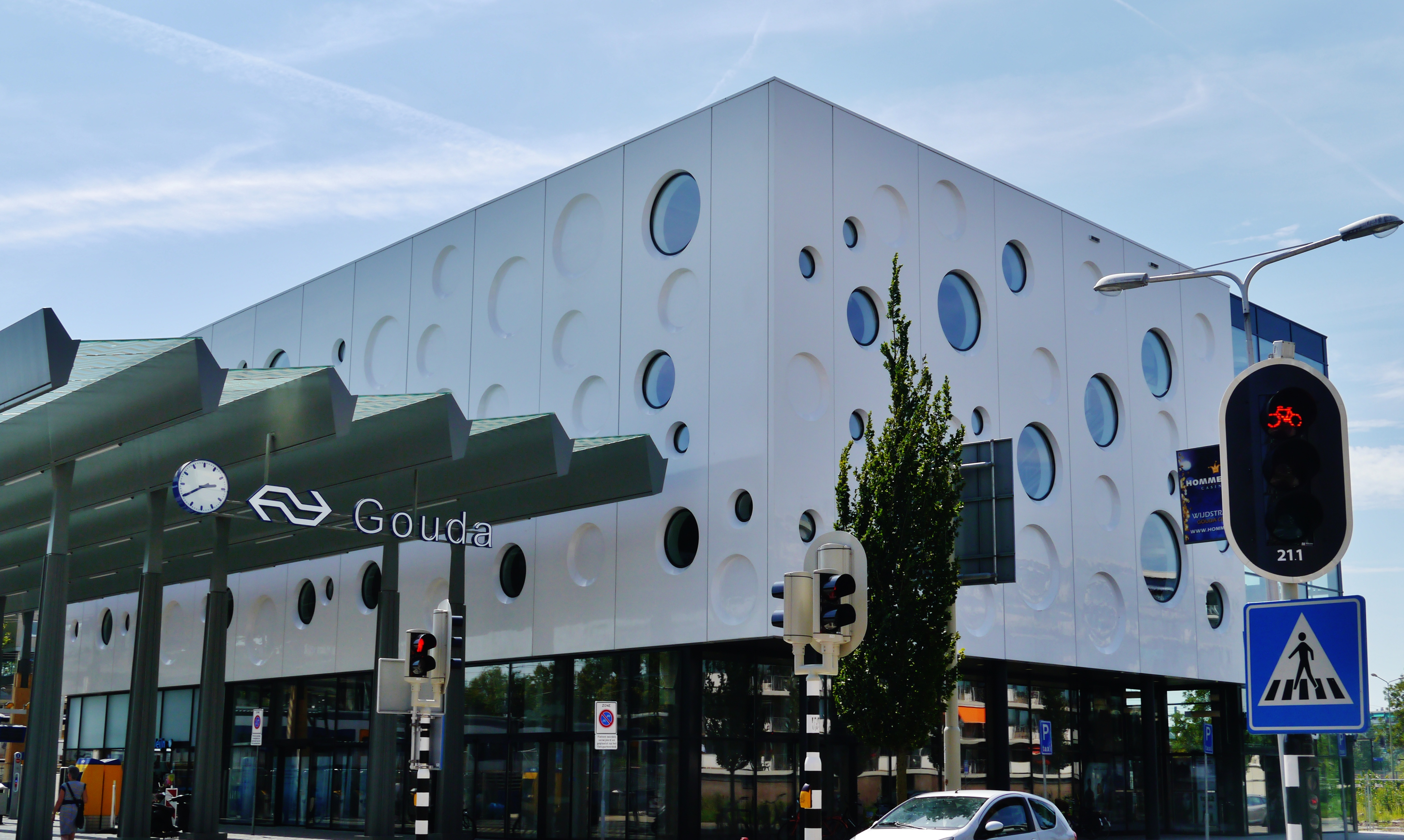
- Gouda railway station

General information
- Location: Gouda, South Holland, Netherlands
- Coordinates: 52°01′03″N 4°42′20″E
- Owner: Nederlandse Spoorwegen
- Lines: Utrecht–Rotterdam railway Gouda–Den Haag railway Gouda–Alphen aan den Rijn railway
- Platforms: 6
- Tracks: 11
- Connections: Arriva: 1, 2, 3, 4, 175, 178, 190, 196, 278, 386, 497, 726; Syntus Utrecht: 106, 107

History
- Opened: 21 May 1855

Services
Preceding station	Nederlandse Spoorwegen	Following station
Den Haag Centraal Terminus	NS Intercity 500	Utrecht Centraal towards Groningen
Den Haag Centraal Terminus	NS Intercity 600	Utrecht Centraal towards Leeuwarden
Den Haag Centraal Terminus	NS Intercity 1700 Until 20:00	Utrecht Centraal towards Enschede
Rotterdam Alexander towards Rotterdam Centraal	NS Intercity 2000 Until 20:30	Utrecht Centraal Terminus
Rotterdam Alexander towards Rotterdam Centraal	NS Intercity 2800	Utrecht Centraal Terminus
Nieuwerkerk aan den IJssel towards Rotterdam Centraal	NS Sprinter 4000	Gouda Goverwelle towards Uitgeest
Lansingerland-Zoetermeer towards Den Haag Centraal	NS Sprinter 6000 After 18:00 and Fri-Sun	Gouda Goverwelle towards 's-Hertogenbosch
Lansingerland-Zoetermeer towards Den Haag Centraal	NS Sprinter 6800	Gouda Goverwelle Terminus
Lansingerland-Zoetermeer towards Den Haag Centraal	NS Sprinter 6900 Mon-Thur until 18:00	Gouda Goverwelle towards Tiel
Waddinxveen Triangel towards Alphen aan den Rijn	NS Sprinter 8600	Terminus
Waddinxveen Triangel towards Alphen aan den Rijn	NS Sprinter 8700	Terminus
Location
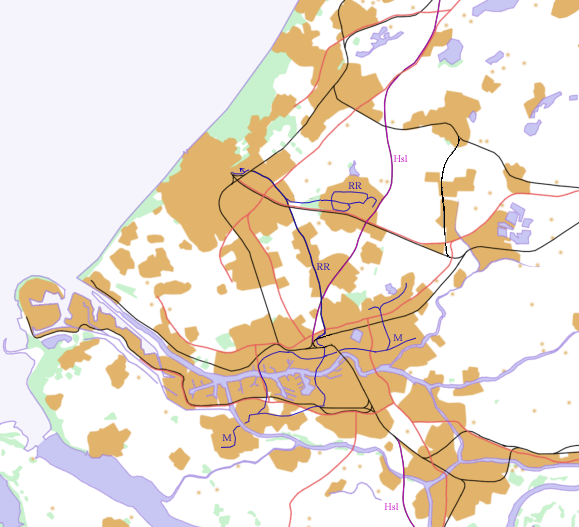
- Location within Southwest Randstad Location within Netherlands

Gouda is a railway station in Gouda, Netherlands. The station opened on 21 May 1855 when the Nederlandsche Rhijnspoorweg-Maatschappij (Dutch Rijn Railway Company) opened the Utrecht–Rotterdam railway. The Gouda–Den Haag railway to The Hague was opened in 1870, and the connection to Alphen a/d Rijn in 1934.

Trains running between Den Haag Centraal / Rotterdam Centraal and Utrecht Centraal call at the station, as well as the RijnGouweLijn connection to Alphen a/d Rijn.

In November 1944, during World War II, the strategically located railway station was bombed by the Royal Air Force. The main building of the railway station was severely damaged; traces of the bombing are visible to this day on platforms 3 and 5. In 1948 a new building was constructed out of the remaining first floor of the old building. This was replaced by the current building in 1984. In 2022 the building and related nearby infrastructure were renovated.

== Train services ==
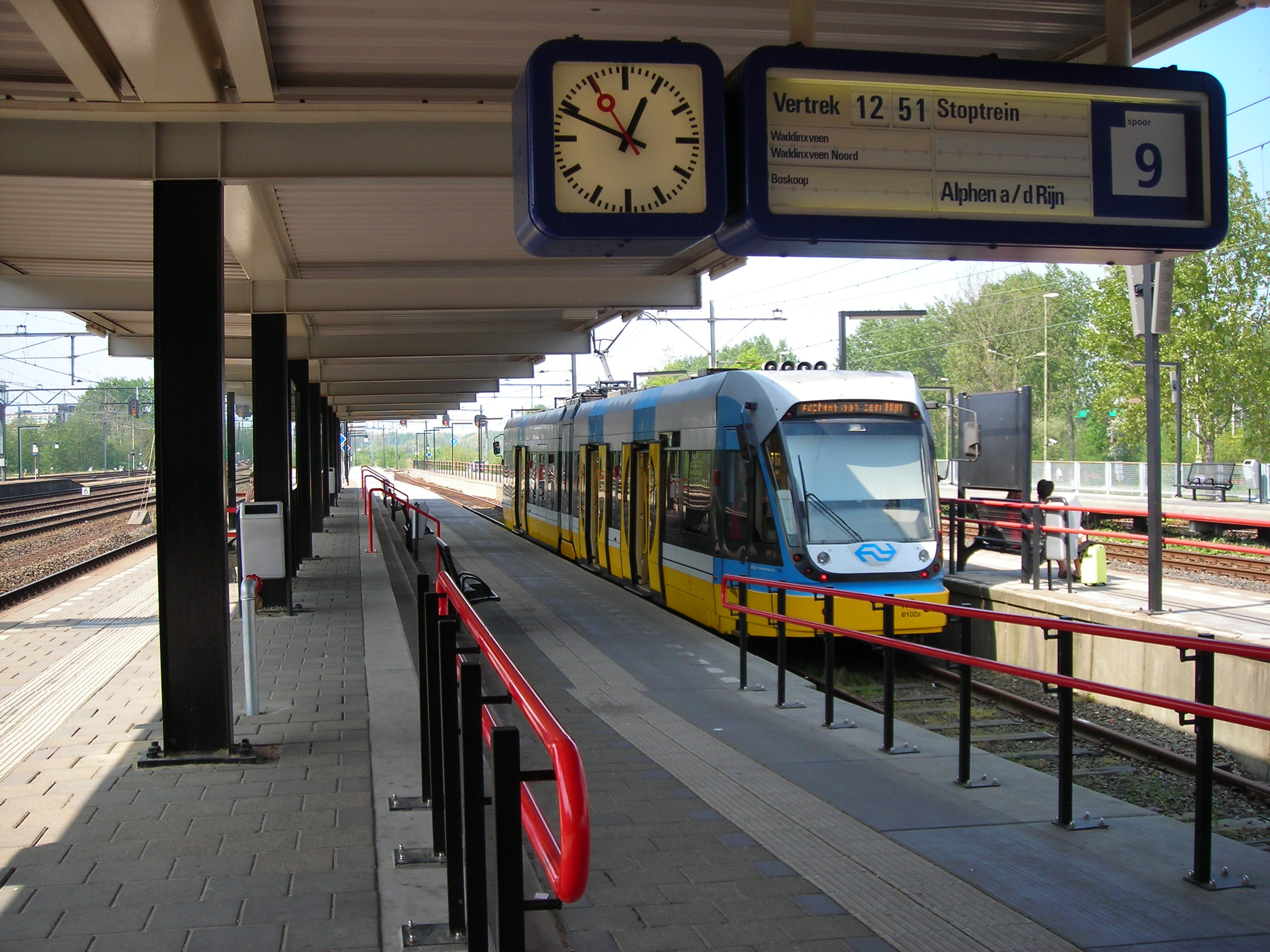
A RijnGouweLijn train on platform 9 of the railway station in Gouda

The following train services call at Gouda:

- 1x per hour intercity service Rotterdam – Utrecht – Amersfoort – Zwolle – Groningen
- 1x per hour intercity service Rotterdam – Utrecht – Amersfoort – Zwolle – Leeuwarden
- 2x rush hour intercity service Rotterdam – Utrecht
- 1x per hour intercity service The Hague – Utrecht – Amersfoort – Hengelo – Enschede
- 1x per hour intercity service The Hague – Utrecht – Amersfoort – Amersfoort Schothorst
- 2x per hour rush hour intercity service The Hague – Utrecht
- 2x per hour local service (sprinter) Rotterdam – Gouda – Gouda Goverwelle – Woerden – Amsterdam – Uitgeest
- 2x per hour local service (sprinter) Rotterdam – Gouda – Gouda Goverwelle (Peak hours only)
- 2x per hour local service (sprinter) The Hague – Gouda – Gouda Goverwelle – Utrecht
- 2x per hour local service (sprinter) The Hague – Gouda – Gouda Goverwelle (Weekdays only)
- 4x per hour local service (sprinter) Gouda – Alphen aan den Rijn

== Bus services ==
- 1
- 2
- 3
- 4
- 106
- 107
- 175
- 178
- 190
- 196
- 278 (rush hour 178)
- 386
- 497
- 726
