= Culemborg railway station =

Railway station in the Netherlands

Culemborg
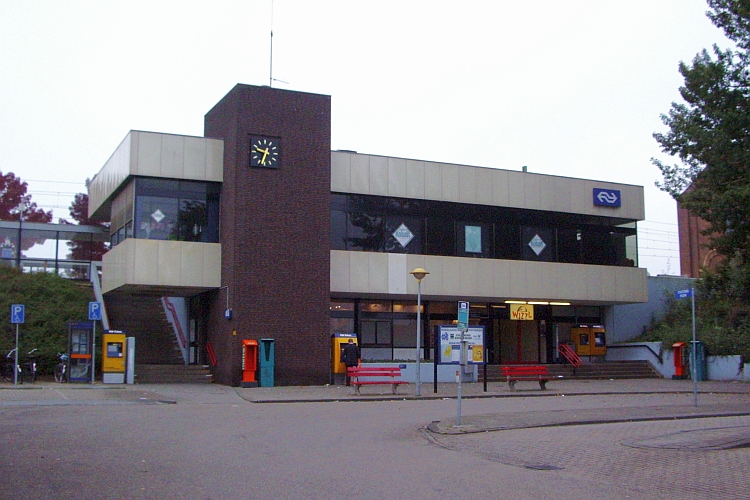

General information
- Location: Stationsweg 11, Culemborg; Netherlands
- Coordinates: 51°56′50″N 5°13′38″E
- Line: Utrecht–Boxtel railway
- Platforms: 2
- Tracks: 2

Other information
- Station code: CI

History
- Opened: 1 November 1868

Services
Preceding station	Nederlandse Spoorwegen	Following station
Houten Castellum towards Den Haag Centraal	NS Sprinter 6000 After 18:00 and Fri-Sun	Geldermalsen towards 's-Hertogenbosch
Houten Castellum towards Leiden Centraal	NS Sprinter 6700 After 18:00 and Fri-Sun	Geldermalsen towards Tiel
Houten Castellum towards Den Haag Centraal	NS Sprinter 6900 Mon-Thur until 18:00	Geldermalsen towards Tiel
Houten Castellum towards Leiden Centraal	NS Sprinter 8800 Mon-Thur until 18:00	Geldermalsen towards 's-Hertogenbosch
Location
- Location within Netherlands

Culemborg is a railway station in Culemborg, Netherlands.

== Description ==
The station opened on 1 November 1868 and is on the Utrecht–Boxtel railway. The station is in the southern end of the town, on the edge of the Pavijen industrial estate and near the sustainable development EVA Lanxmeer.

== Services ==
=== Train services ===
Route	Service type	Operator	Notes
Woerden - Utrecht - Geldermalsen - Tiel	Local ("Sprinter")	NS	2x per hour
The Hague - Utrecht - Geldermalsen - 's-Hertogenbosch	Local ("Sprinter")	NS	2x per hour

=== Bus services ===
Line	Route	Operator	Notes
46	(Tiel Passewaaij -) Tiel Station - Kerk-Avezaath - Erichem - Buren - Asch - Zoelmond - Beusichem - Culemborg	Arriva and Juijn	During weekday daytime hours, this bus runs through to Tiel Passewaaij. Arriva operates this bus during weekday daytime hours, Juijn during evenings and weekends.
146	Culemborg - Everdingen - Hagestein - Vianen	Arriva and Juijn	
641	Lienden ← Ommeren ← Ingen ← Eck en Wiel - Maurik - Rijswijk - Ravenswaaij - Zoelmond - Beusichem - Culemborg	Juijn	Rush hours only.
650	Leerdam - Rhenoy - Rumpt - Beesd - Culemborg	Juijn	Rush hours only.

== See also ==
- Culemborg railway bridge
