= Houten railway station =

Railway station in the Netherlands

Houten
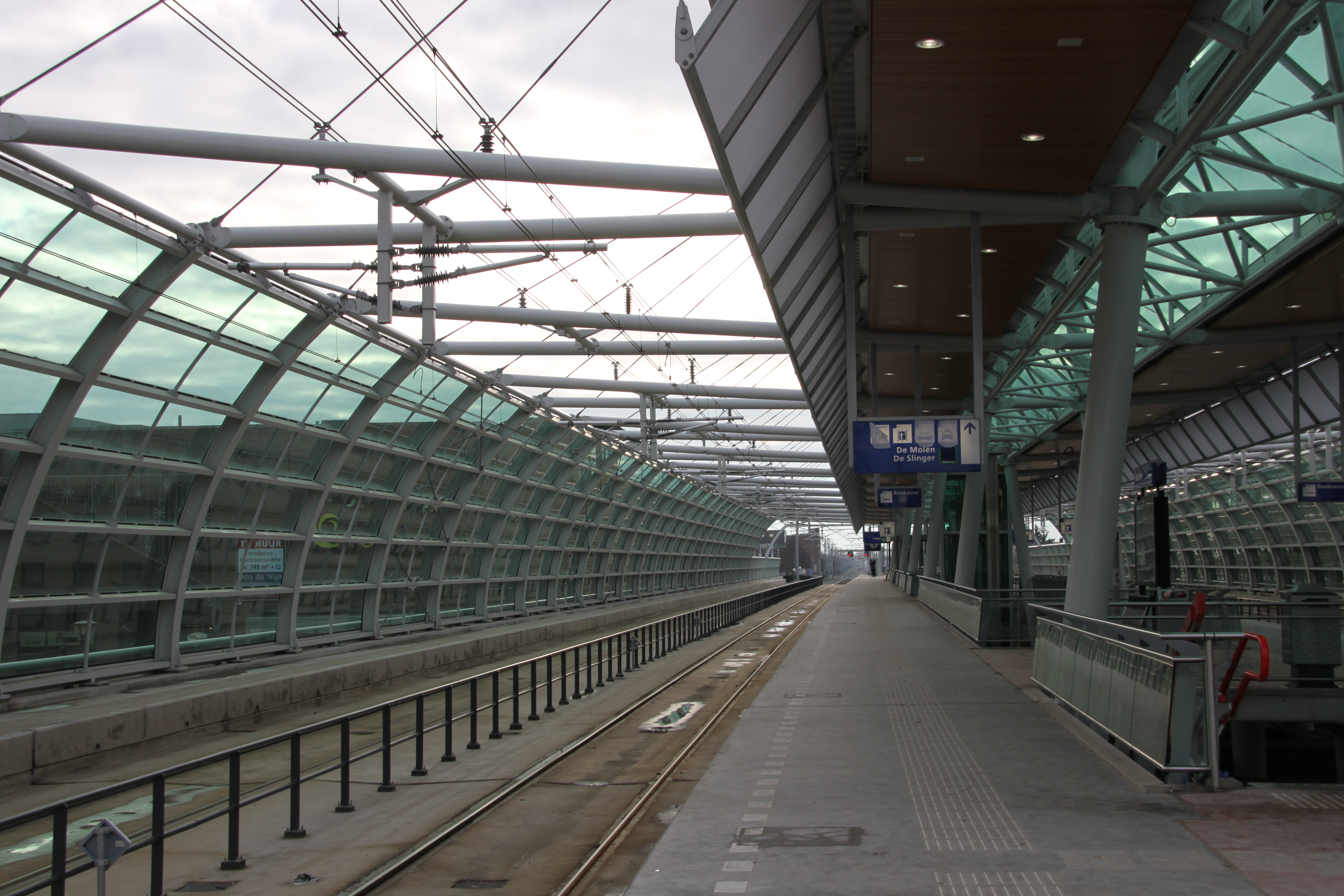

General information
- Location: Netherlands
- Coordinates: 52°02′04″N 5°10′04″E
- Line: Utrecht–Boxtel railway

Other information
- Station code: Htn

History
- Opened: 1 November 1868, 1982
- Closed: 1935

Services
Preceding station	Nederlandse Spoorwegen	Following station
Utrecht Lunetten towards Den Haag Centraal	NS Sprinter 6000 After 18:00 and Fri-Sun	Houten Castellum towards 's-Hertogenbosch
Utrecht Lunetten towards Leiden Centraal	NS Sprinter 6700 After 18:00 and Fri-Sun	Houten Castellum towards Tiel
Utrecht Lunetten towards Den Haag Centraal	NS Sprinter 6900 Mon-Thur until 18:00	Houten Castellum towards Tiel
Utrecht Lunetten towards Leiden Centraal	NS Sprinter 8800 Mon-Thur until 18:00	Houten Castellum towards 's-Hertogenbosch
Location
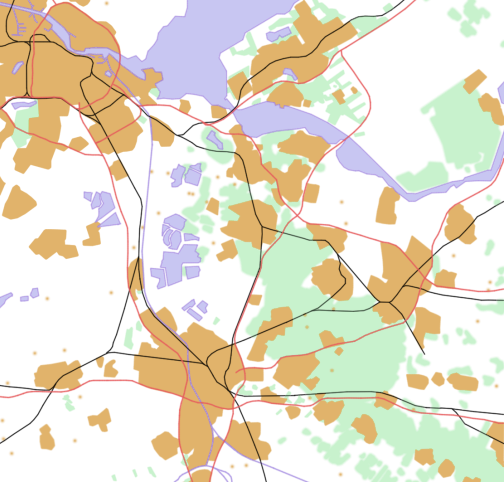
- Location within Northeastern Randstad

Houten is a railway station located in Houten, Netherlands. The station was opened on 1 November 1868 and is located on the Utrecht–Boxtel railway and the Houten - Houten Castellum tram line which closed on 14 December 2008. The services are operated by Nederlandse Spoorwegen. The station was closed between 1935 and 1982.

A 2005 ProRail survey estimated there were about 9,224 passengers using this station per day.

== Original Station ==
The original station was the one opened in 1868, which closed in 1935.

=== Moving the Station ===
In August 2007, the station building was moved 150 m (492 ft) north of its previous location, which was 600 m (1,969 ft) south of the current station.

The building had to be moved to allow for the line to be quad-tracked from Utrecht to 's-Hertogenbosch, but the station building was part of Houten's past and it is the last building of its type on this line.

== Train services ==
Route	Service type	Operator	Notes
Woerden - Utrecht - Geldermalsen - Tiel	Local ("Sprinter")	NS	2x per hour
The Hague - Utrecht - Geldermalsen - 's-Hertogenbosch	Local ("Sprinter")	NS	2x per hour
Utrecht Centraal - Houten - Houten Castellum	Local ("Sprinter")	NS	2x per hour (rush hours only). Runs non-stop from Utrecht to Houten, but local from Houten to Utrecht during morning rush hour and vice versa during afternoon rush hour.

=== Bus services ===
Line	Route	Operator	Notes
43	Houten - Odijk - Driebergen-Zeist Station - Zeist	U-OV, CTS and Pouw Vervoer	The route between Houten and Odijk is only served during weekdays. Pouw Vervoer operates most of the runs, U-OV only a few; CTS operates the evening and Sunday runs and also the Saturday runs during Summer Break.
44	Houten Station - Houten Oude Dorp/De Meerpaal - Hagestein Hoefslag - Vianen Hoef en Haag - Vianen De Hagen/De Biezen - Vianen Centrum	U-OV and Pouw Vervoer	Weekdays only.
45	Houten - 't Goy - Schalkwijk - Houten	CTS	Monday-Saturday during daytime hours only.
47	Utrecht Centraal - Utrecht Tolsteeg - Utrecht Hoograven-Noord - Houten	U-OV	No service after 21:30. During Saturday and Sunday evenings, this bus only operates within Utrecht.
48	Houten - Nieuwegein - Utrecht Papendorp - Utrecht Leidsche Rijn - De Wetering - Utrecht Lage Weide - Maarssenbroek - Maarssen	U-OV	During evenings, this bus only operates between Houten and Nieuwegein. On weekends during daytime hours, this bus only operates between Houten and Utrecht Leidsche Rijn.
49	Houten Station - Houten Zuid	U-OV	No service on evenings and Saturdays; only Mon-Fri and Sundays during daytime hours.
149	Houten - Schalkwijk - Houten	U-OV	Only operates on weekday and Saturday evenings.
247	Houten - Nieuwegein De Liesbosch - Utrecht Kanaleneiland-Zuid - Utrecht Hoograven-Noord - Utrecht Centraal	U-OV	Rush hours only. Runs from Houten to Utrecht during morning rush hours and vice versa during afternoon rush hours.
281	Houten - Utrecht Rijnsweerd - Utrecht Science Park	U-OV	Weekdays during daytime hours only. Operates from Houten to Utrecht until 14:00 and vice versa from 13:00-18:00.
447	Utrecht → Houten	U-OV	Friday and Saturday late nights only (between midnight and 5:00).
530 ("FC-Utrecht Express")	Houten - Utrecht Galgenwaard	U-OV	1 run in both directions during evenings, but only if there's a soccer match in Utrecht's Galgenwaard stadium.
682	Houten - Nieuwegein - Amersfoort Hoornbeeck/Van Lodenstein	Pouw Vervoer	1 run during morning rush hours from Houten to Amersfoort and 2 runs vice versa during afternoon rush hours.

== Gallery ==
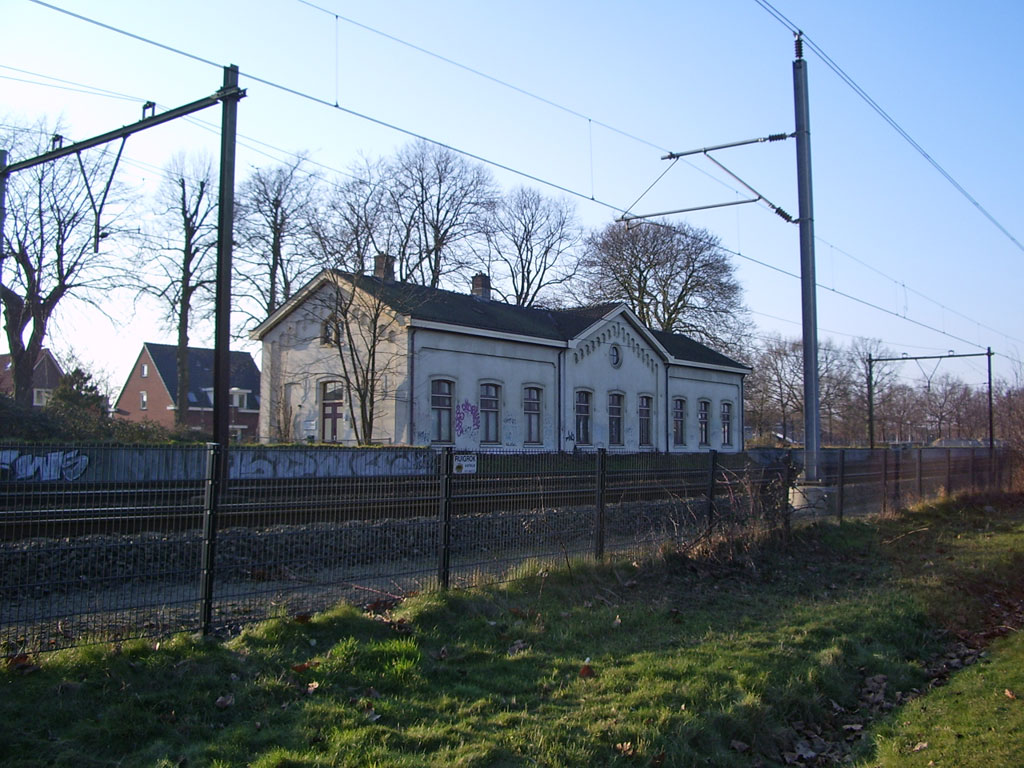
Old railway station building in February 2006

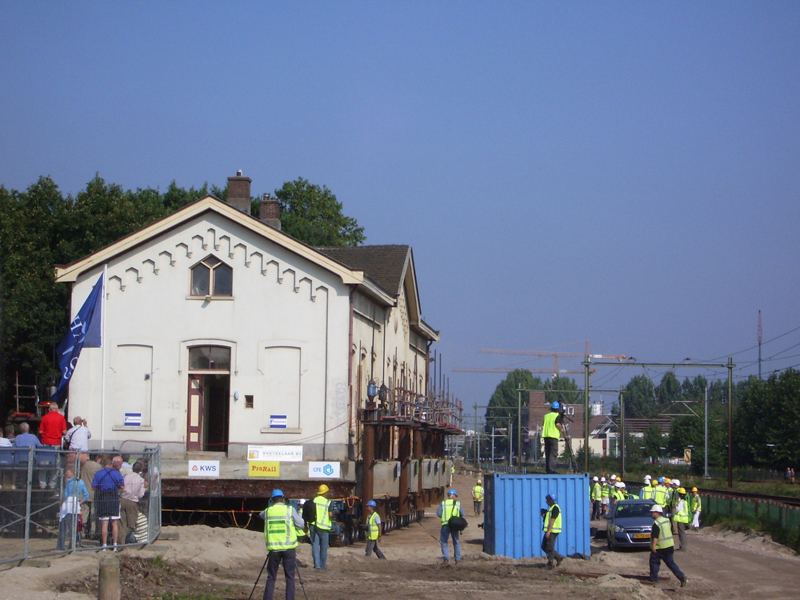
Building arriving at its new location, August 24, 2007

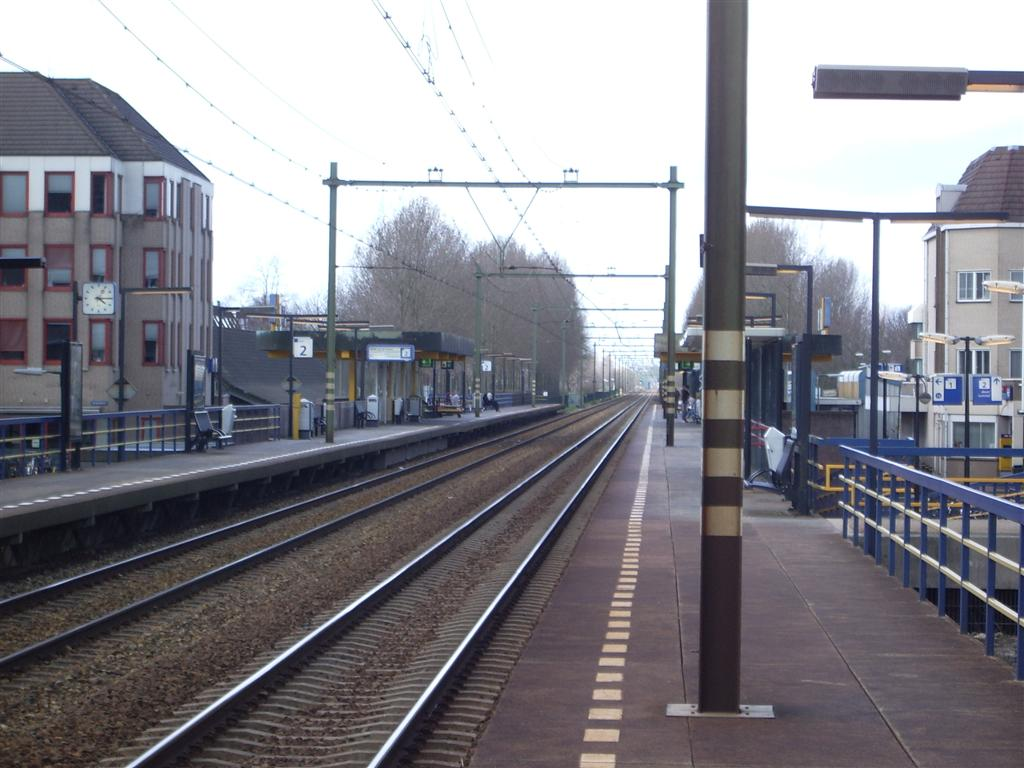
Platforms in 2006

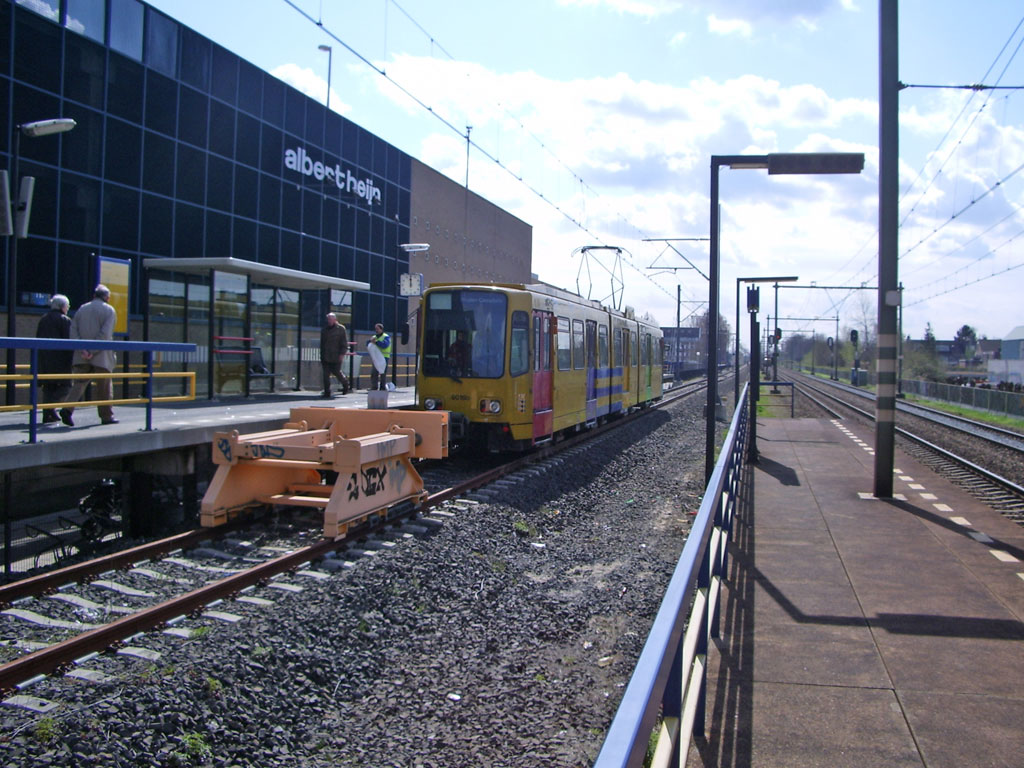
Tram station at Houten

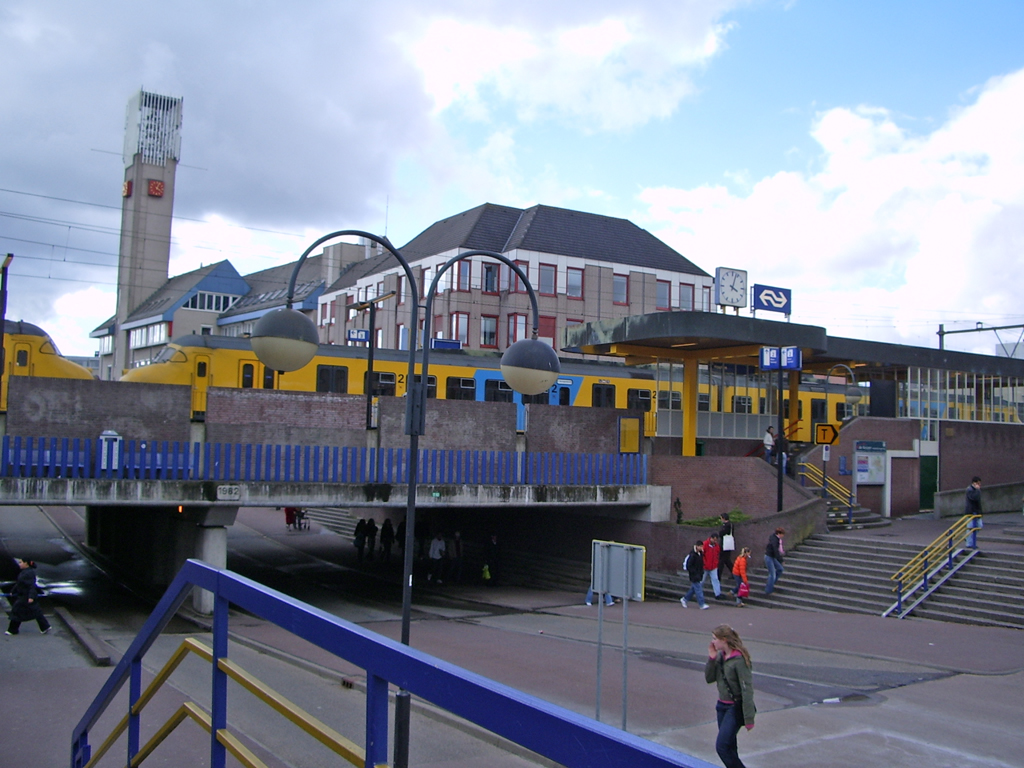
East side of station in 2006

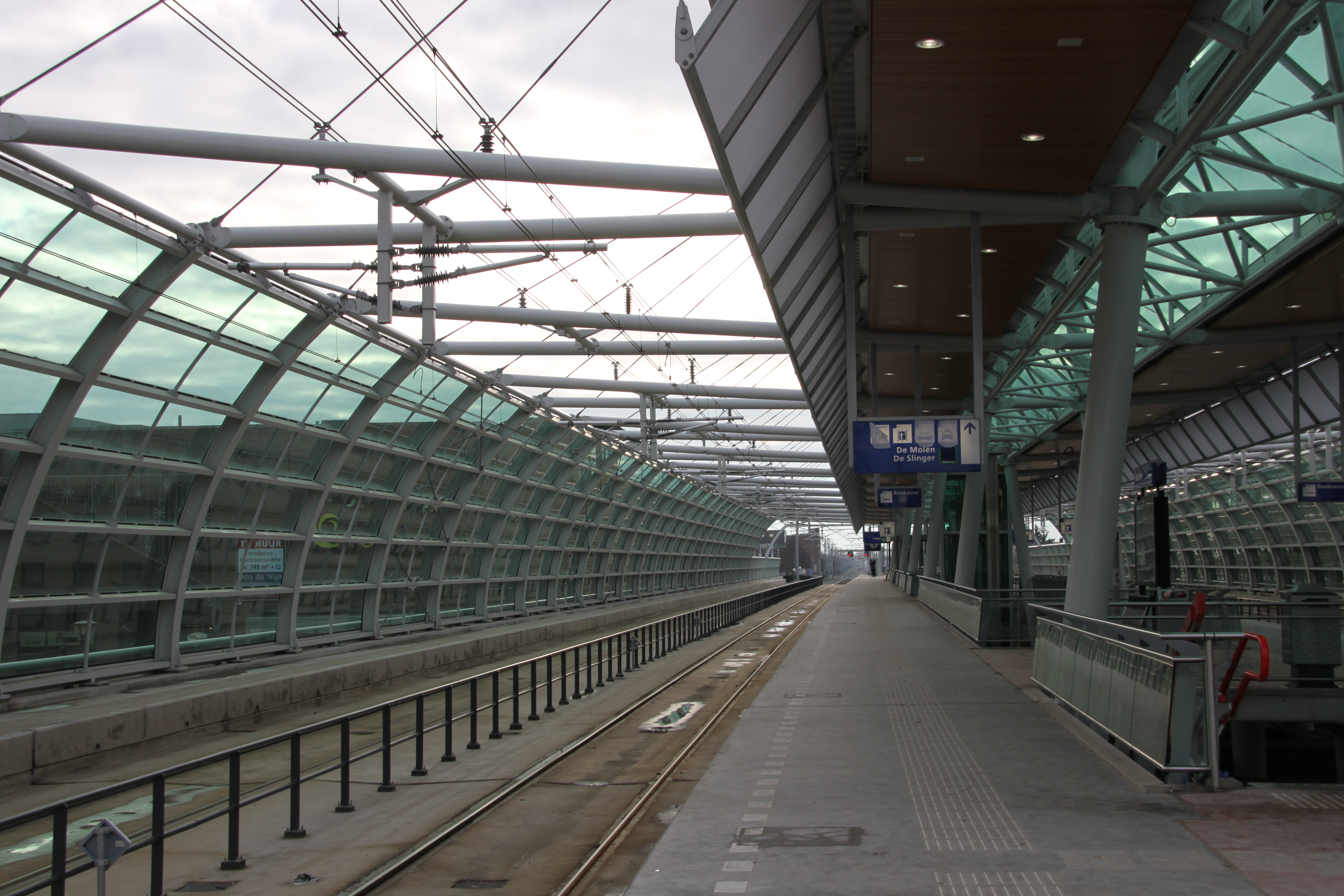
New railway station, opened in 2011
