= Houten Castellum railway station =

Railway station in the Netherlands

Houten Castellum
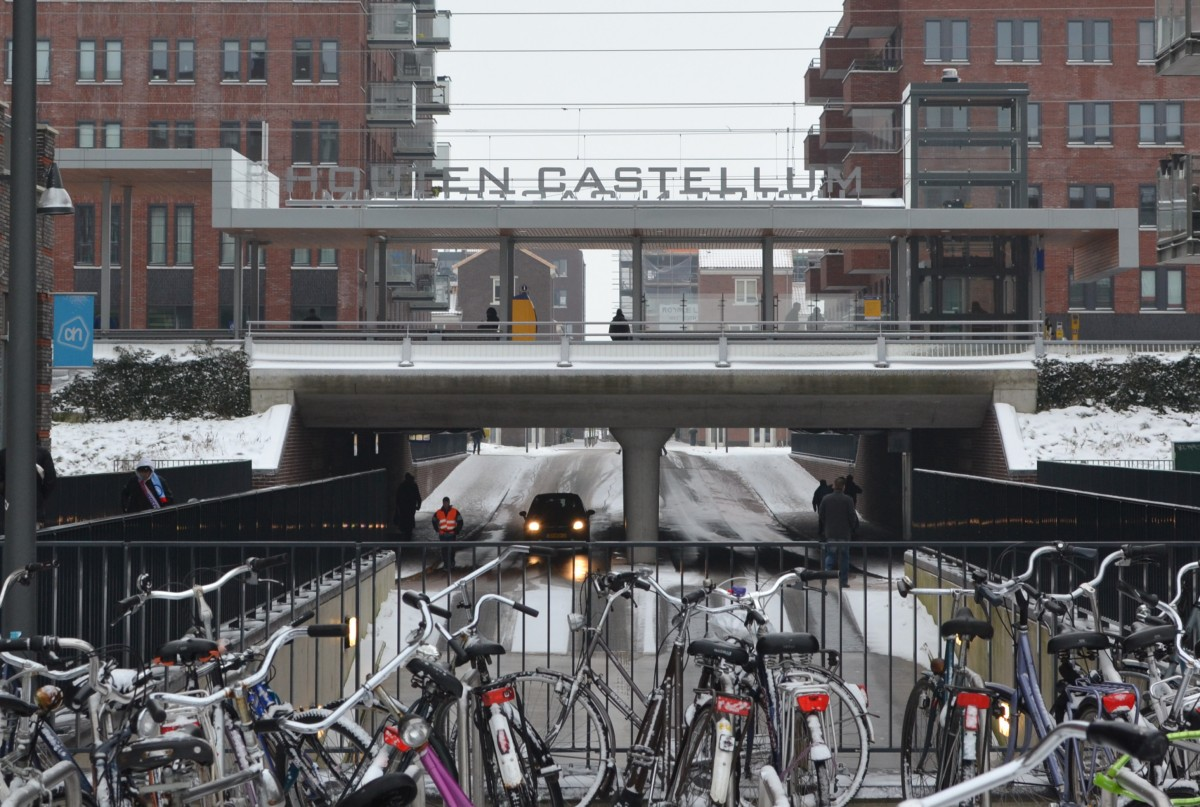

General information
- Location: Netherlands
- Coordinates: 52°01′05″N 5°10′44″E
- Line: Utrecht–Boxtel railway

History
- Opened: 8 January 2001 (old), 12 December 2010 (new)
- Closed: 2008 (old)

Services
Preceding station	Nederlandse Spoorwegen	Following station
Houten towards Den Haag Centraal	NS Sprinter 6000 After 18:00 and Fri-Sun	Culemborg towards 's-Hertogenbosch
Houten towards Leiden Centraal	NS Sprinter 6700 After 18:00 and Fri-Sun	Culemborg towards Tiel
Houten towards Den Haag Centraal	NS Sprinter 6900 Mon-Thur until 18:00	Culemborg towards Tiel
Houten towards Leiden Centraal	NS Sprinter 8800 Mon-Thur until 18:00	Culemborg towards 's-Hertogenbosch
Location
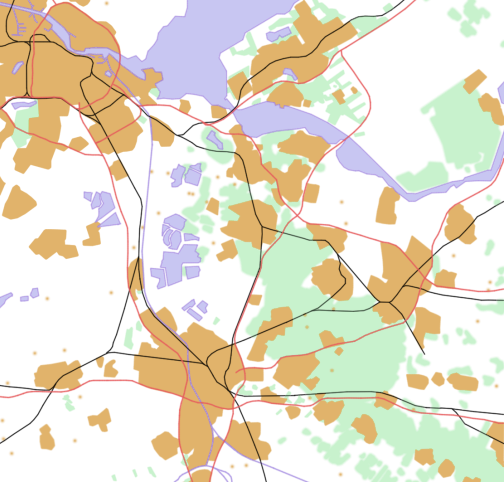
- Location within Northeastern Randstad

Houten Castellum is a railway station located in Houten, Netherlands, which opened at 8 January 2001 and it is located on the Utrecht–Boxtel railway . Originally it was the southernmost point of the Houten - Houten Castellum tram line. This temporary service closed at 14 December 2008. The services are operated by Nederlandse Spoorwegen. During this time the service was operated by a tram from Hannover on loan to Nederlandse Spoorwegen, operated by HTM. After closure of the tram line due to construction of a new station and expanding of the railway to 4 tracks, the tram service was replaced by a bus service. The new station opened at 12 December 2010 and bus service ceased. All local trains call at Houten Castellum at the center platform along the inner tracks, while Intercity services and cargo trains use the outer tracks.

== Train services ==
Route	Service type	Operator	Notes
Utrecht - Geldermalsen - 's-Hertogenbosch	Local ("Sprinter")	NS	2x per hour
The Hague - Woerden - Utrecht - Geldermalsen - Tiel	Local ("Sprinter")	NS	2x per hour
Utrecht Centraal - Houten - Houten Castellum	Local ("Sprinter")	NS	2x per hour (rush hours only). Runs non-stop from Utrecht to Houten, but local from Houten to Utrecht during morning rush hour and vice versa during afternoon rush hour.

== Bus services ==
Line	Route	Operator	Notes
45	Houten - 't Goy - Schalkwijk - Houten	CTS	Monday-Saturday during daytime hours only.

== Gallery ==
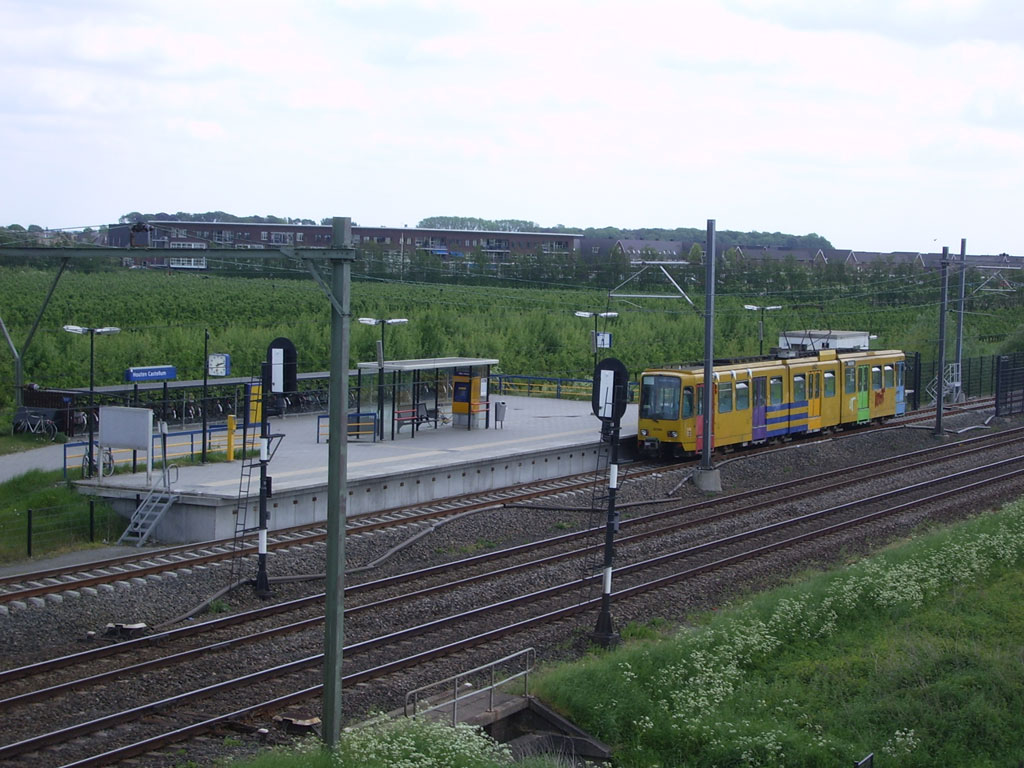
The station in 2006

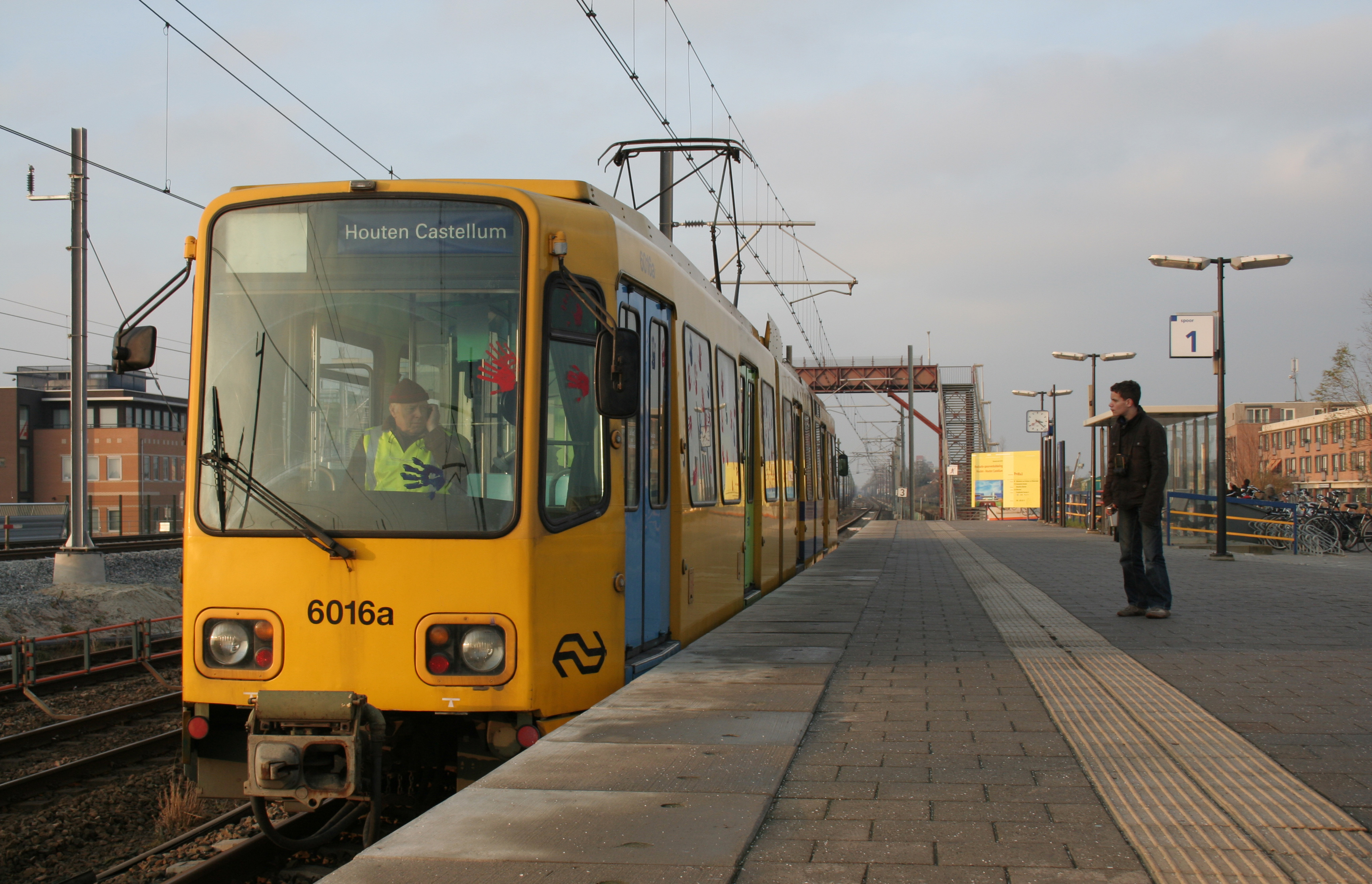
Last tram service in 2008

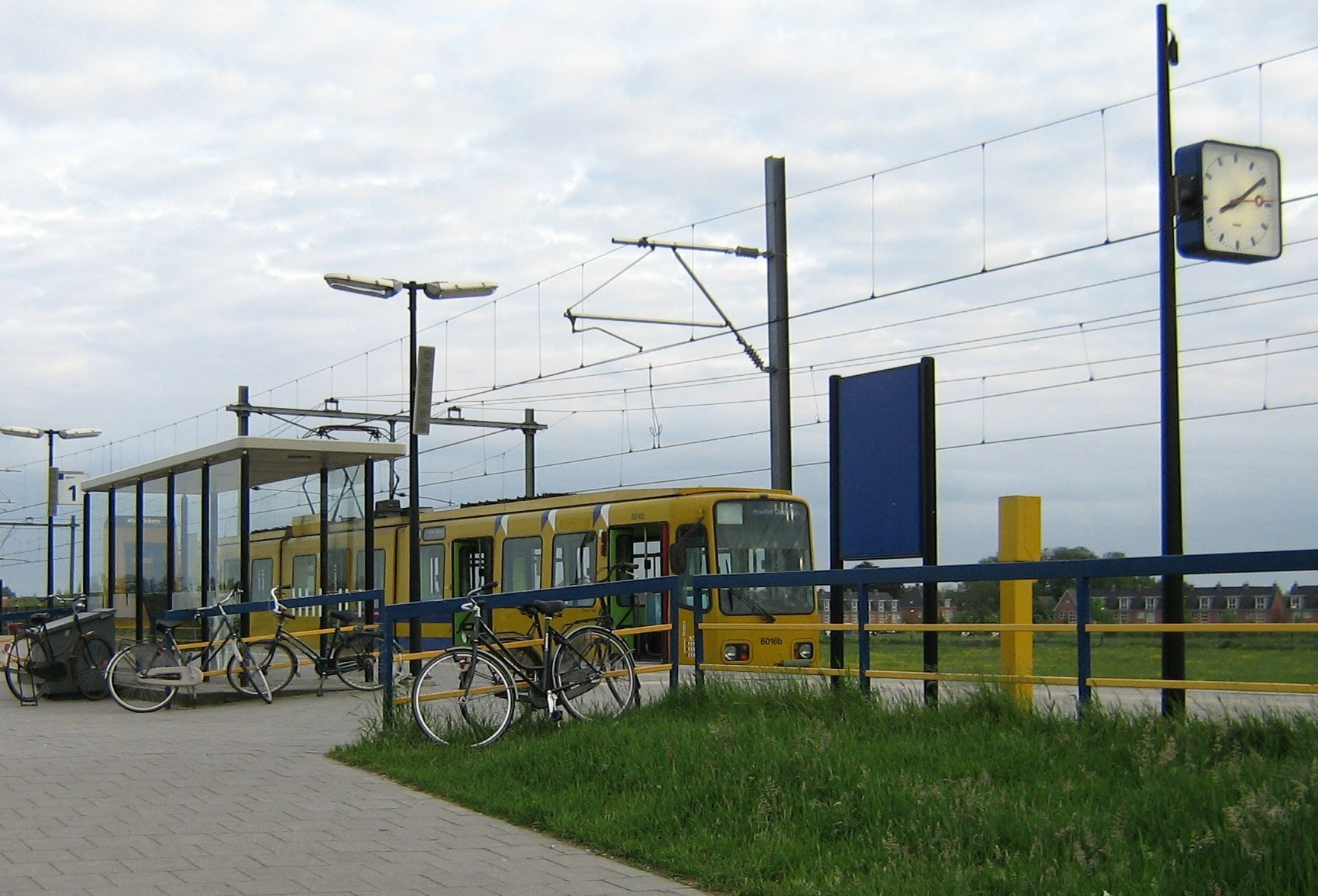
Tram at Houten Castellum

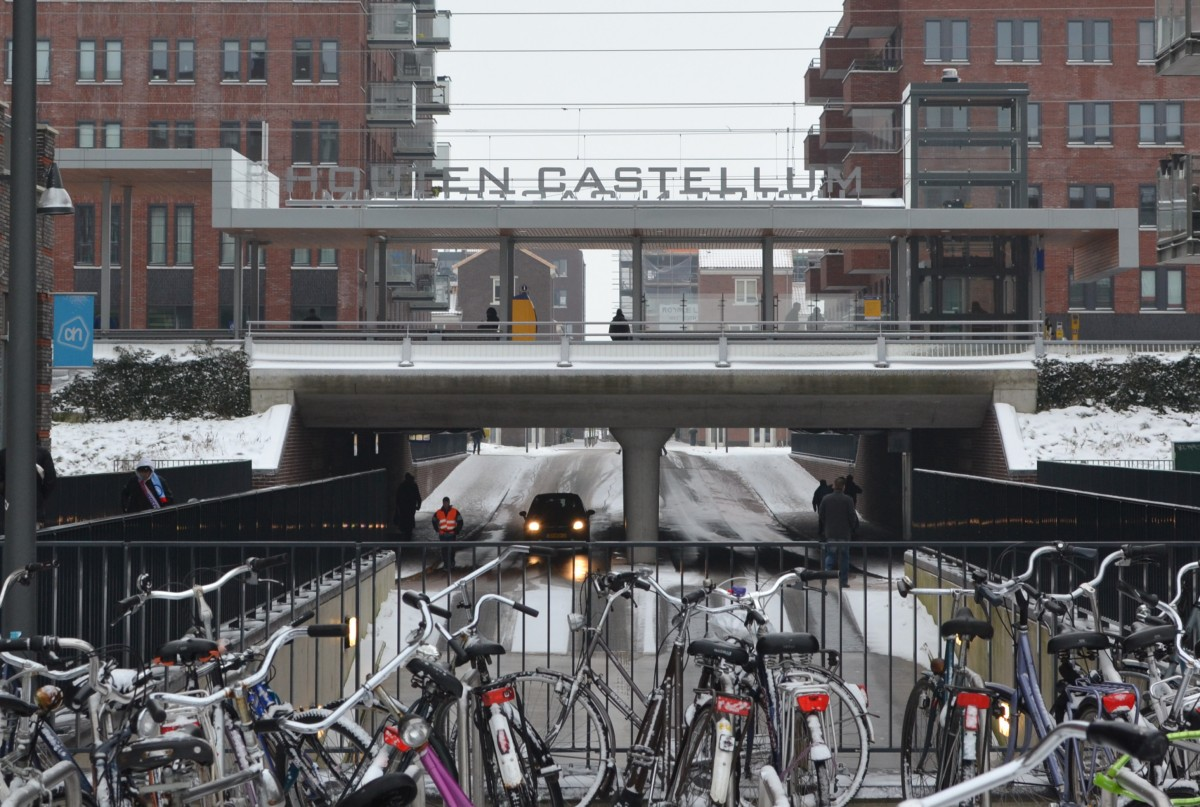
The station as seen from the surrounding shopping centre

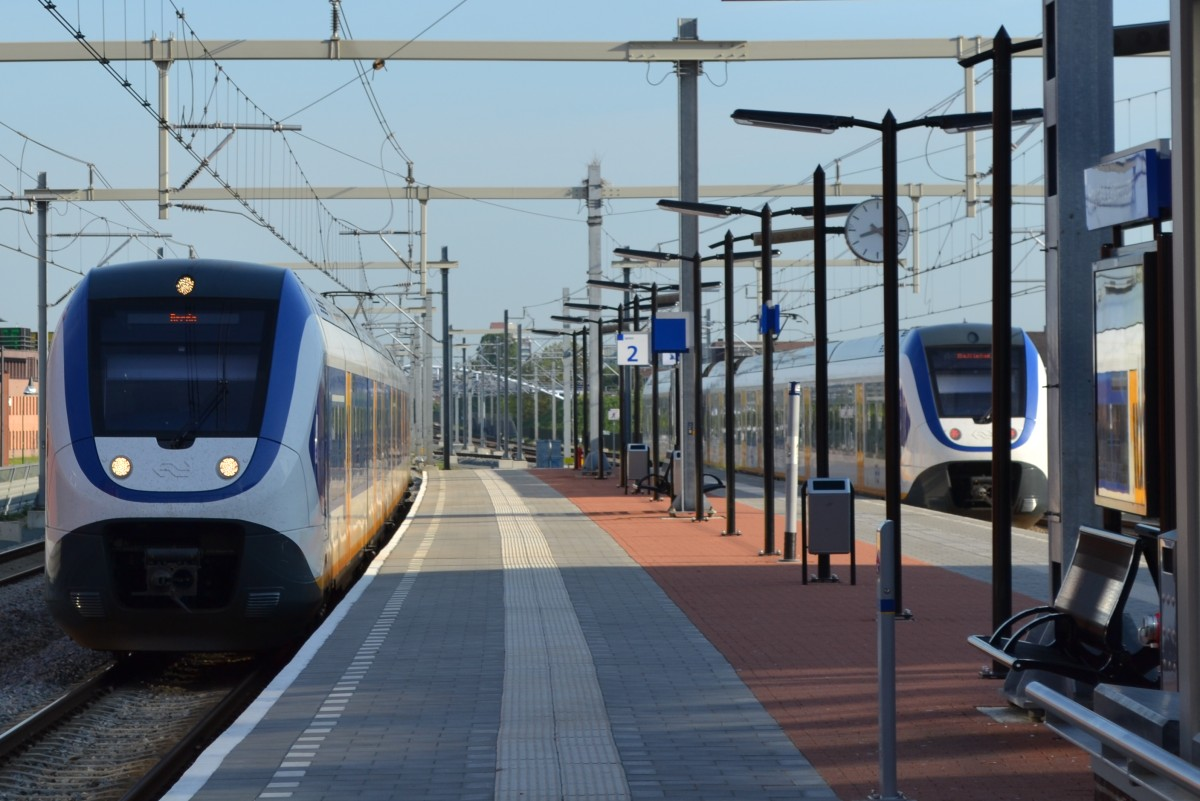
The platform in direction Utrecht Centraal railway station in 2012
