= Zaltbommel railway station =

Railway station in the Netherlands

Zaltbommel
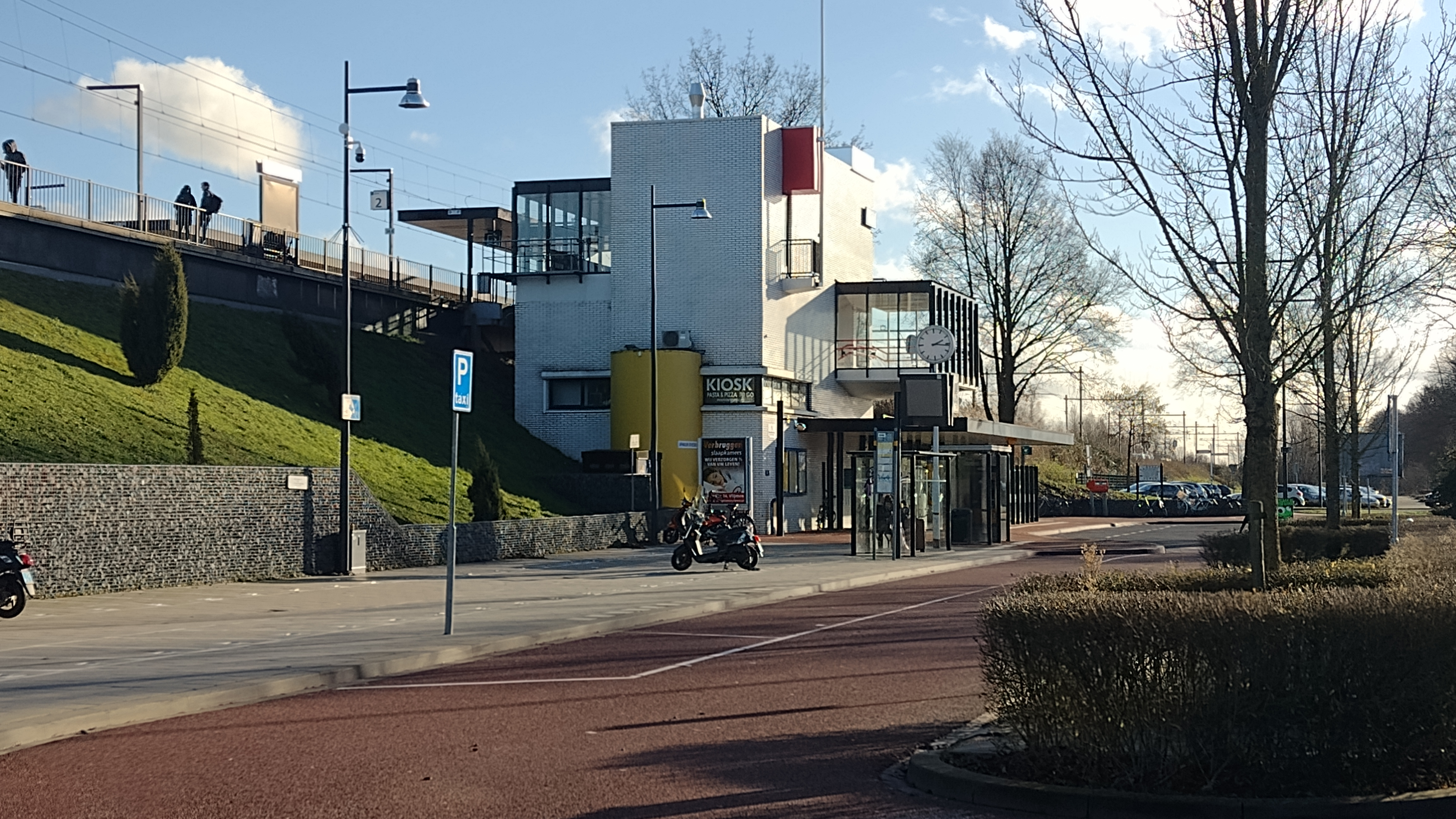
- Zaltbommel railway station in 2023

General information
- Location: Netherlands
- Coordinates: 51°48′25″N 5°15′53″E
- Line: Utrecht–Boxtel railway

History
- Opened: 1 Nov 1869

Services
Preceding station	Nederlandse Spoorwegen	Following station
Geldermalsen towards Den Haag Centraal	NS Sprinter 6000 After 18:00 and Fri-Sun	's-Hertogenbosch Terminus
Geldermalsen towards Leiden Centraal	NS Sprinter 8800 Mon-Thur until 18:00	's-Hertogenbosch Terminus
Location
- Location within Netherlands

Zaltbommel is a railway station located in Zaltbommel, Netherlands. The station was opened on 1 November 1869 and is located on the Utrecht–Boxtel railway. The train services are operated by Nederlandse Spoorwegen.

== Train services ==
Route	Service type	Operator	Notes
The Hague - Utrecht - Geldermalsen - 's-Hertogenbosch	Local ("Sprinter")	NS	2x per hour

== Bus services ==
Line	Route	Operator	Notes
49	Zaltbommel - Gameren - Zuilichem - Brakel	Juijn	Mon-Fri during daytime hours only.
67	Zaltbommel - Kerkdriel	Arriva	Rush hours only, with a few extra runs during the off-peak afternoon. Does not operate during school breaks.
68	Zaltbommel - Bruchem - Kerkwijk - Delwijnen - Nederhemert - Aalst - Poederoijen	Arriva	Rush hours only. Does not operate during school breaks.
248	Tiel - Ophemert - Varik - Heesselt - Opijnen - Neerijen - Waardenburg - Zaltbommel	Arriva	During evenings and weekends, this bus only operates if called 1 hour before its supposed departure ("belbus").
266	Wijk en Aalburg - Nederhemert - Well - Ammerzoden - Hedel - Bruchem - Zaltbommel	Arriva	During evenings and weekends, this bus only operates if called 1 hour before its supposed departure ("belbus").
267	Ammerzoden - Hedel - Velddriel - Kerkdriel - Alem - Rossum - Hurwenen - Zaltbommel	Arriva	Mon-Fri during daytime hours only.
268	Giessen - Andel - Poederoijen - Aalst - Nederhemert - Delwijnen - Kerkwijk - Bruchem - Zaltbommel	Arriva	Mon-Fri during daytime hours only.
649	Brakel → Zuilichem → Nieuwaal → Gameren → Zaltbommel ← Kerkdriel	Juijn	Two runs during morning rush hours only. Does not operate during school breaks.
664	Zaltbommel → Alem → Rossum → Heerewaarden	Arriva	Two runs during afternoon rush hours only. Does not operate during school breaks.
667	Alem - Rossum - Hurwenen - Zaltbommel	Juijn and Arriva	Rush hours only. Does not operate during school breaks.
668	Rossum - Hurwenen - Zaltbommel - Bruchem - Kerkwijk - Delwijnen - Nederhemert - Aalst - Andel	Juijn and Arriva	Rush hours only. Does not operate during school breaks.
669	Zaltbommel → Bruchem → Kerkwijk → Well → Nederhemert → Wijk en Aalburg	Juijn	One runs during morning rush hours only. Does not operate during school breaks.
860	Zaltbommel - Bruchem - Gameren - Nieuwaal - Zuilichem - Brakel - Andel - Giessen - Poederoijen - Aalst - Nederhemert - Delwijnen - Well - Ammerzoden - Hedel - Velddriel - Kerkdriel - Alem - Rossum - Hurwenen - Zaltbommel	Arriva	Only operates during evenings and weekends. Can be boarded at all times from Zaltbommel Station, but for all other stops, this bus only operates if called one hour before its supposed departure ("belbus").
