= Culemborg =

- City and municipality
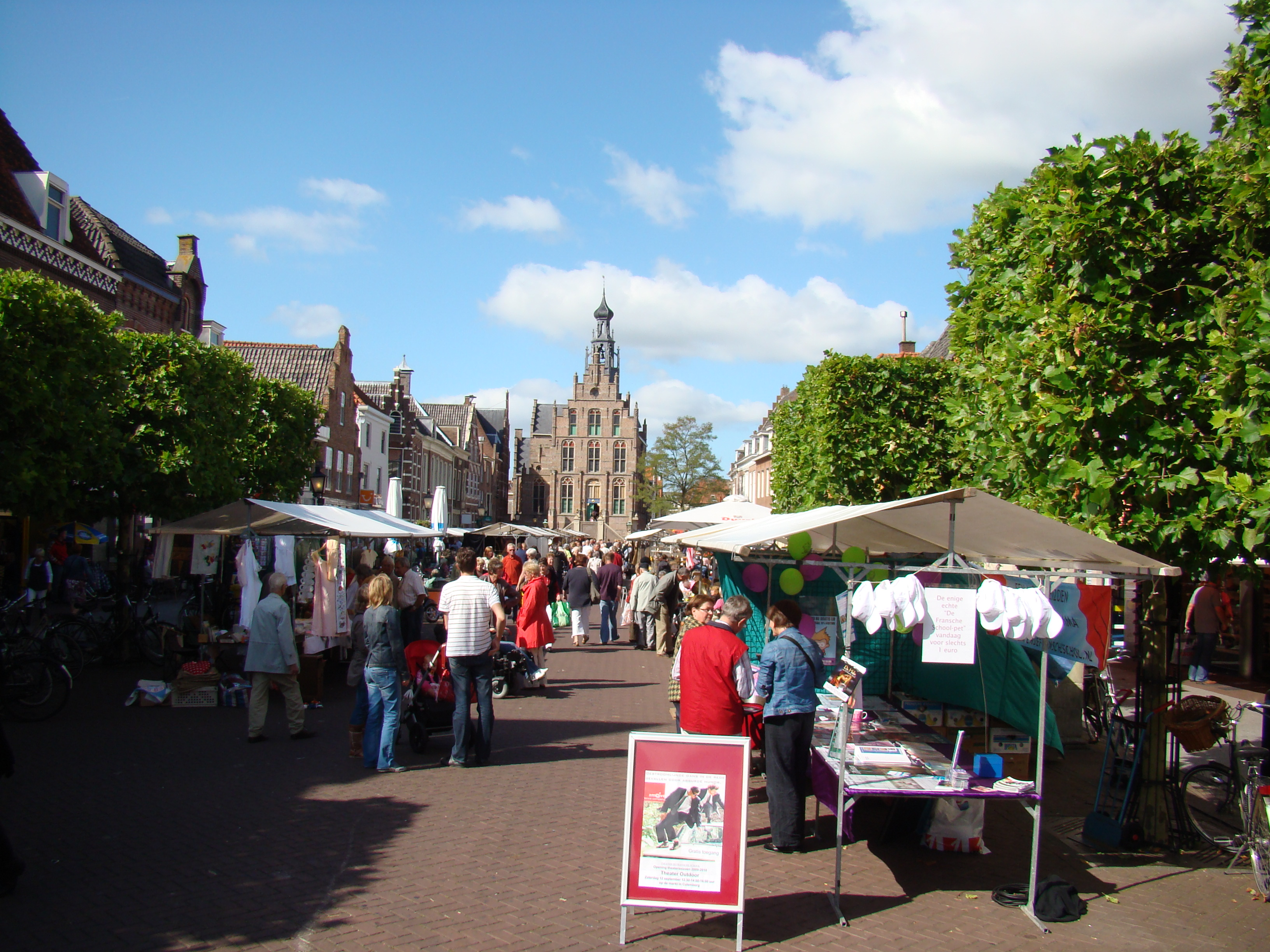
- Culemborg market square

- Flag Coat of arms

- Location in Gelderland
- Coordinates: 51°57′13″N 5°13′34″E
- Country: Netherlands
- Province: Gelderland

Government
  - Body: Municipal council
  - Mayor: Marinka Mulder (PvdA)

Area
  - Total: 31.14 km^{2} (12.02 sq mi)
  - Land: 29.29 km^{2} (11.31 sq mi)
  - Water: 1.85 km^{2} (0.71 sq mi)
- Elevation: 5 m (16 ft)

Population (January 2021)
  - Total: 29,121
  - Density: 994/km^{2} (2,570/sq mi)
- Demonym: Culemborger
- Time zone: UTC+1 (CET)
  - Summer (DST): UTC+2 (CEST)
- Postcode: 4100–4107
- Area code: 0345
- Website: www.culemborg.nl

Culemborg (Dutch pronunciation: [ˈkyləmbɔr(ə)x]) is a municipality and a city in the centre of the Netherlands, in the province of Gelderland. The city had a population of 29,386 on 1 January 2022 and is situated just south of the Lek river. Direct train lines run from the railway station towards the cities of Utrecht and Den Bosch, via the near railway bridge.

From 1318 until 1798 Culemborg was the seat of an independent lordship, later county of the Holy Roman Empire, and it retains a largely intact historic centre with a town gate, remnants of its city walls and the Elisabeth Weeshuis. In the late twentieth century the city became known for EVA-Lanxmeer, an ecological neighbourhood developed together with its future residents.

== Etymology ==
The oldest example of the name is Culenburgh from 1281. Throughout the centuries several spellings have been used: Kulenborch (1305), Culenborgh (1353), Colemborch (1363), Culemborch (1472). The former part of the name (which today would be kuil) refers to a hole or pit, while the later refers to the castle that was built there around 1270.

== History ==
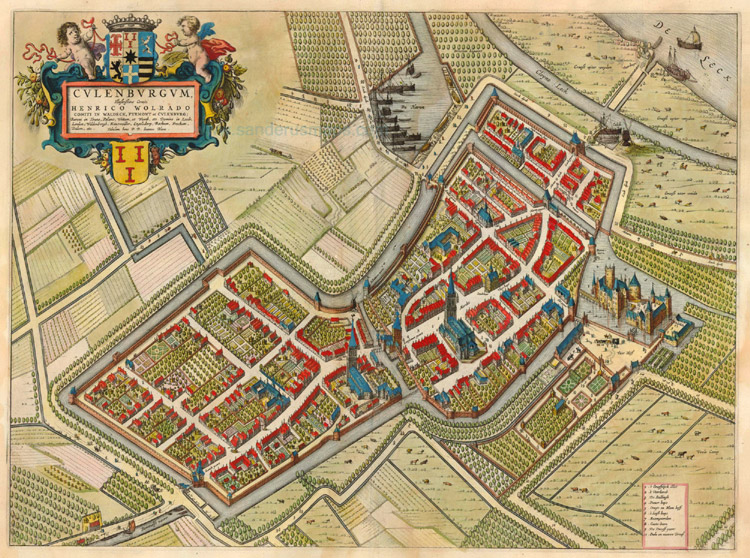
Culemborg in Joan Blaeu's map from his Tooneel der Steeden, 1649

=== Lordship and county ===
Culemborg, formerly also spelled Kuilenburg or Kuylenburgh, received city rights in 1318.

Despite its Dutch character, Culemborg was not legally part of the Netherlands until the late 18th century, and was instead part of a fiefdom in the Holy Roman Empire. The fiefdom (later county) had gained the right of toll collection and the right of asylum: it was a so-called 'Vrijstad' (free city). In practice, this meant that people who had fled to Culemborg from other cities (for example due to bankruptcy) could evade their creditors in Culemborg as the creditors would not be allowed entry into the city. This did not mean that criminals could escape justice in Culemborg: the manor had its own justice system which could sentence criminals. The phrase 'Naar Culemborg gaan' (Going to Culemborg) became synonymous with going bankrupt.

The last sovereign ruler of the old lordship was Elisabeth van Culemborg (1475–1555), born at Hoogstraten Castle, who married first Jan of Luxembourg and then Antoine of Lalaing. Shortly before her death in 1555 Emperor Charles V raised the lordship to a county. As she had no children, the county passed to her great-nephew Floris of Pallandt (1539–1598). Her bequest paid for the Elisabeth Weeshuis, built between 1557 and 1560.

Floris of Pallandt was one of the nobles behind the 1566 Compromise of Nobles; the confederates met at his palace in Brussels, which the Duke of Alba later had demolished. At home he turned to Protestantism: in September 1566 he gave the chapel of the Gasthuis to the Calvinists, and when the preaching spread he had the images removed from the church in his own town. In 1639 the county passed to the German Waldeck-Eisenberg family, whose arrival brought Lutheranism to the town; the first Lutheran services were held in the castle chapel in 1640. The family held the county until 1714, after which it passed to the House of Saxe-Hildburghausen.

In Joan Blaeu's map of 1649, Culemborg remains entirely enclosed by walls behind its city moat-like encircling canals. The moated castle stands outside the city walls. Houses present a united front along streets and the two canals that cut the city in three sections, but they all face gardens behind, and market gardens are plentiful within the city walls.

=== The French invasion and the end of the county ===
When French troops invaded the Dutch Republic in 1672, the town authorities obtained neutrality assurances, arguing that the county did not legally belong to the Republic, but Culemborg nevertheless suffered badly in 1672–1673. The castle east of the town was heavily damaged during the French occupation and was largely demolished in 1735; its last remnant, a tower, disappeared in 1812, and only the castle garden survives.

In 1720 the county was sold to the estates of the Nijmegen Quarter, who presented it to Stadtholder Willem IV in 1748. To this day, the Dutch king Willem-Alexander remains count of Culemborg. In 1795 the city was occupied by French forces, and a few years later it was completely incorporated in the Bataafse Republiek, losing its sovereign rights.

=== 19th and 20th centuries ===
In 1868, a railway bridge was built over the river Lek which was the longest bridge in Europe for a few years. Just upstream of it is a reaction ferry.

==== Jewish community ====
Culemborg had a Jewish community by the mid-18th century. Its dead were first buried at Buren until the community opened its own cemetery on the Westerborgwal in 1764. A synagogue is recorded from 1791, and a new neo-Gothic synagogue was consecrated next to it in 1868, when the community numbered around 200. The community declined from the 1880s onward. During the German occupation the synagogue was used as a stable and its contents were lost, and in 1947 the community was dissolved and merged into that of Utrecht. The building was converted into a Christian Reformed church in 1950. The memorial on the Jewish cemetery commemorates 38 Jewish residents of Culemborg killed in the Second World War, and a second monument was unveiled behind the former synagogue on 5 September 2018.

==== Late 20th century ====
In 1964, about 100 Moluccan families moved into the new Terweijde district. In 2021 the graves of former KNIL soldiers in the town received special status, and in 2024 the community centre for the Moluccan residents of Terweijde reopened.

In 1991, a fireworks explosion occurred in a factory, resulting in 2 deaths and over 20 injuries.

In 1995, Culemborg was one of the cities which was temporarily evacuated because of the risk of flooding.

Between 1994 and 2009, Culemborg developed the ecological neighborhood EVA Lanxmeer. Close collaboration with inhabitants and experimental sustainable design has made the neighbourhood an international best practice. EVA-Lanxmeer was initiated by Marleen Kaptein and developed as a partnership between the municipality, the EVA foundation and future residents. The site covers about 30 hectares next to the railway station and includes housing (around 30% social), an urban farm, a community orchard, offices, schools and its own water-treatment facilities. The municipality was approached with the concept in 1995.

== Transportation ==
Culemborg is served by Culemborg railway station, which offers train services to Utrecht 4x per hour and 2x per hour to 's-Hertogenbosch and Tiel each. The railway station also provides a bus hub, offering buses to the various neighbouring cities and villages (namely Buren, Beusichem and Nieuwegein).

The near railway bridge has been built in the 1860s and at the time it had some important records.

== Topography ==
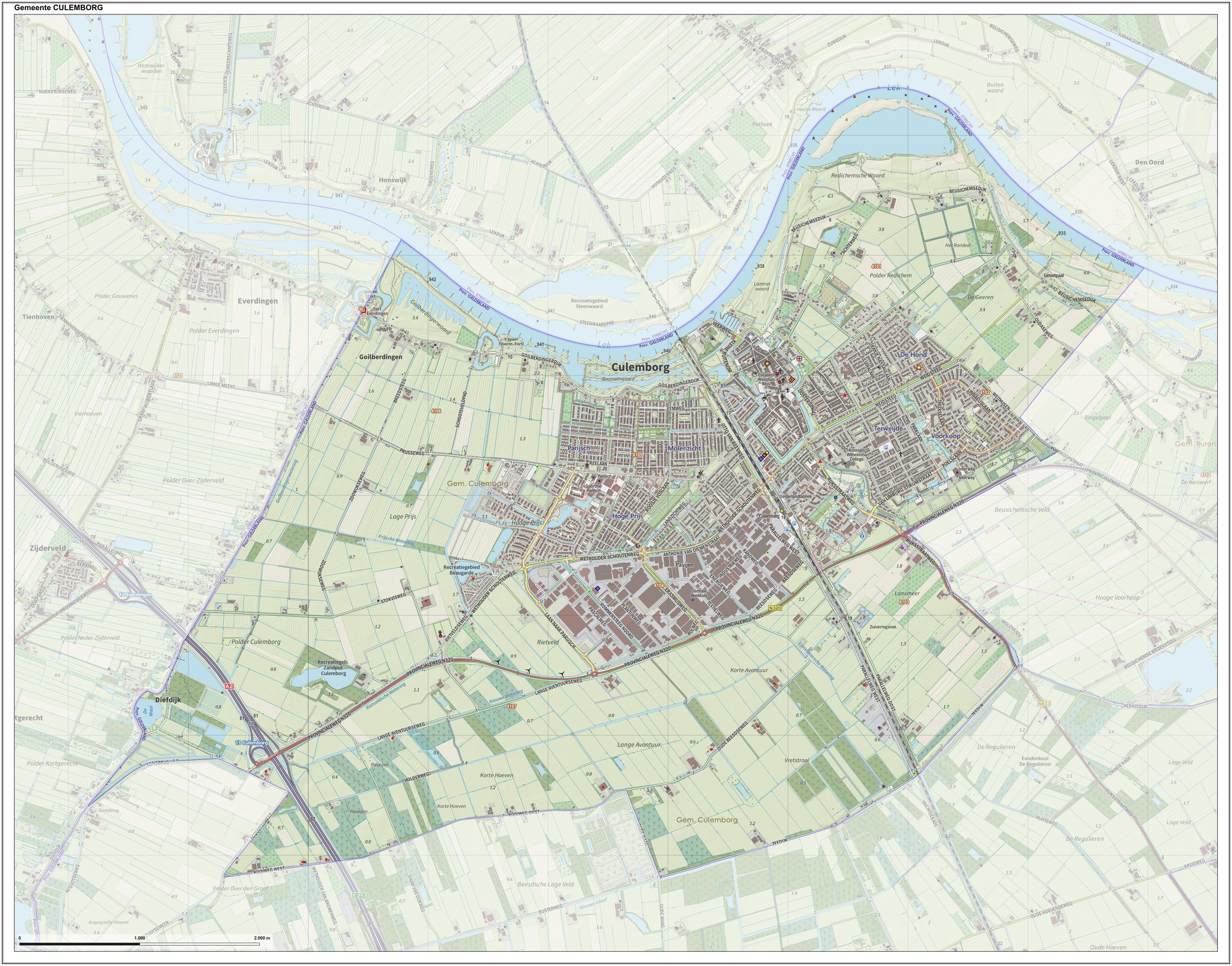

Dutch topographic map of the municipality of Culemborg, June 2015

== Politics ==
=== Municipal council ===
The municipal council of Culemborg has 23 seats. In the municipal election of 18 March 2026, 14,222 of 24,077 eligible voters turned out (59.07%). The joint list of GroenLinks and the PvdA was the largest party with seven seats, followed by the VVD and the local party Culemborg van Nu, each with five.

2026 municipal council election
Party	Votes	%	Seats
GroenLinks–PvdA	4,031	28.50	7
VVD	2,983	21.09	5
Culemborg van Nu	2,532	17.90	5
D66	1,323	9.35	2
CDA	1,023	7.23	2
ChristenUnie	850	6.01	1
Party for the Animals	772	5.46	1
SP	365	2.58	0
CulemborgsBelang	265	1.87	0
Total valid votes	14,144	100	23

=== Municipal executive ===
The mayor, appointed by the Crown, is Marinka Mulder of the PvdA. She is joined in the executive by three aldermen: Mischa Peters (PRO, deputy mayor), Yassin Dagdag (PRO) and Roger van Asselt (VVD). Together PRO and the VVD hold 12 of the 23 council seats.

== Economy ==
Dough processing company Rademaker BV, founded in 1977, moved to Culemborg in 1981 and still has their headquarters here.

Centraal Boekhuis, trading under CB since 2012, is the main distributor of books in The Netherlands and has been based in Culemborg since 1973. The CB received the royal designation in April 2021, hence since then the distributor is referred to as Koninklijk CB (Royal CB).

== Landmarks ==
The historic city within its 14th-century ramparts, together with the adjacent floodplains, is a protected townscape.

- Elisabeth Weeshuis – an orphanage built between 1557 and 1560 from the legacy of Countess Elisabeth van Culemborg, now a Rijksmonument housing a local-history museum. The museum also holds Jewish ritual objects that were handed to its predecessor for safekeeping in May 1940 by the caretaker of the synagogue.
- Binnenpoort (also Lanxmeerpoort) – the town gate on the market side, dated 1557 on older foundations, given an outer gate in 1617 and restored in 1751. Stretches of the old west and south city walls and the Schutterstoren also survive.
- Castle garden (Kasteeltuin) – the only part of the medieval castle complex that survives above ground.
- De Plantage – the town park, first laid out in 1779 and redesigned in 1850 by the landscape architect Louis Paul Zocher, for whom it was an early commission.
- Werk aan het Spoel and Fort Everdingen – fortifications of the New Dutch Waterline near the town.
- The Culemborg railway bridge over the Lek (see History).

=== Windmills ===
There are two traditional windmills in Culemborg, De Hoop and Johanna. The base of a third mill, De Koornvriend, also survives.

== Notable residents ==
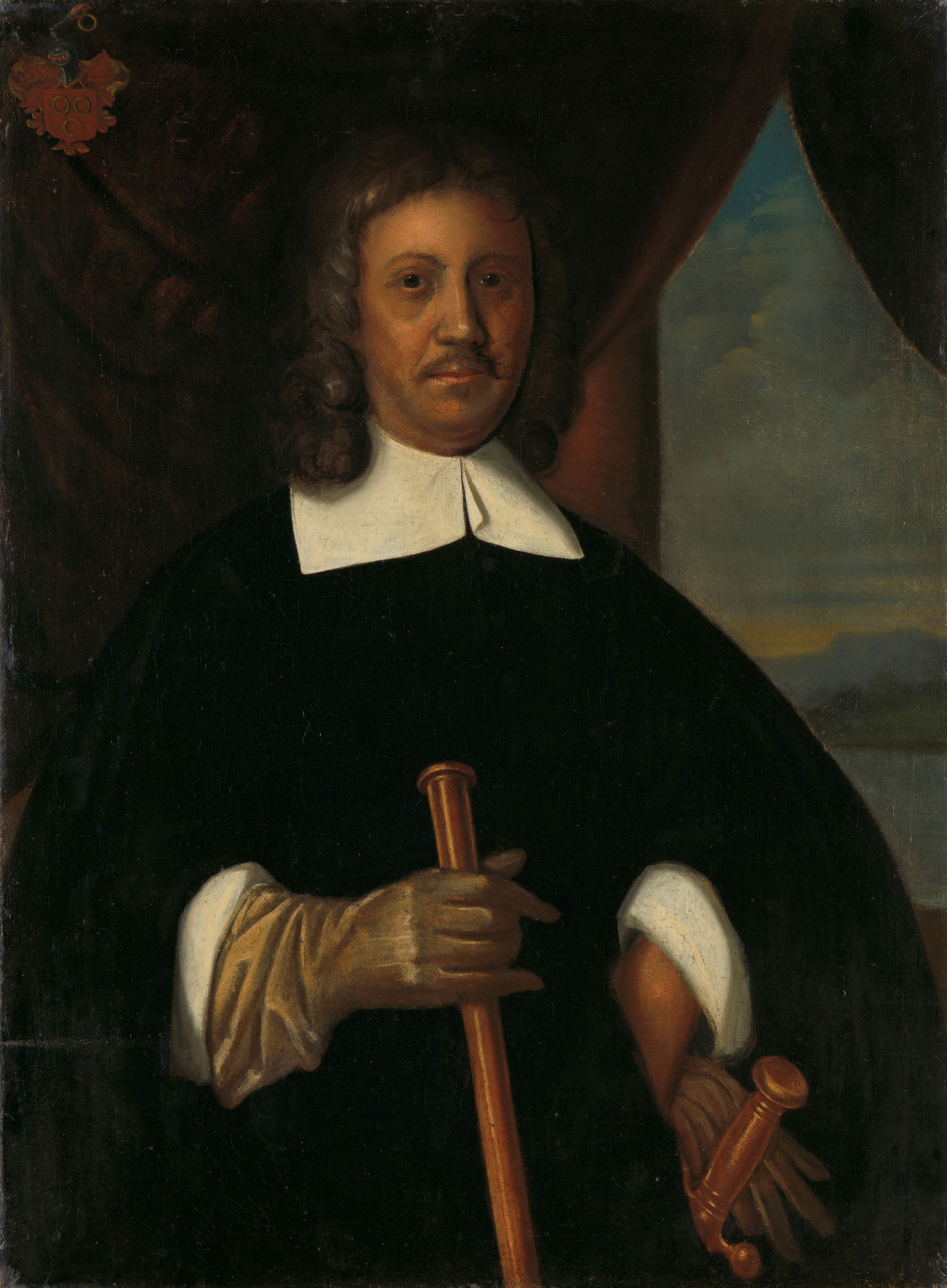
Jan van Riebeeck, 1660

- Anthony van Diemen (1593–1645), Governor-General of the Dutch East Indies
- Jan van Riebeeck (1619–1677), colonial administrator, founded Cape Town (South Africa)
- Roelof de Man (1634 - 1663), bookkeeper and second-in-charge to Jan van Riebeeck at founding of Cape Town (South Africa)
- Otto van Rees (1823–1892), minister and Governor-General of the Dutch East Indies
- Rudi Martinus van Dijk (1932–2003), a Dutch-Canadian composer of orchestral, chamber and vocal music
- Wilhelmina Cooper (1939–1980), fashion model and founder of Wilhelmina Models, New York
- Farid Azarkan (born 1971), politician and leader of Denk
- Jelka van Houten (born 1978), actress

=== Sport ===
- Elly van Hulst (born 1959), retired middle distance runner, participant at the 1984 and 1988 Summer Olympics
- Patrick Pothuizen (born 1972), former football player with over 450 club appearances in Dutch professional competitions
- Jan Oosterhuis (born 1963), former football player with over 200 club appearances in Dutch professional competitions
- Michiel Elijzen (born 1982), former professional road bicycle racer
- Xandra Velzeboer, short-track athlete winning several Olympic gold medals and world championships
- Michelle Velzeboer, short-track athlete

== Gallery ==
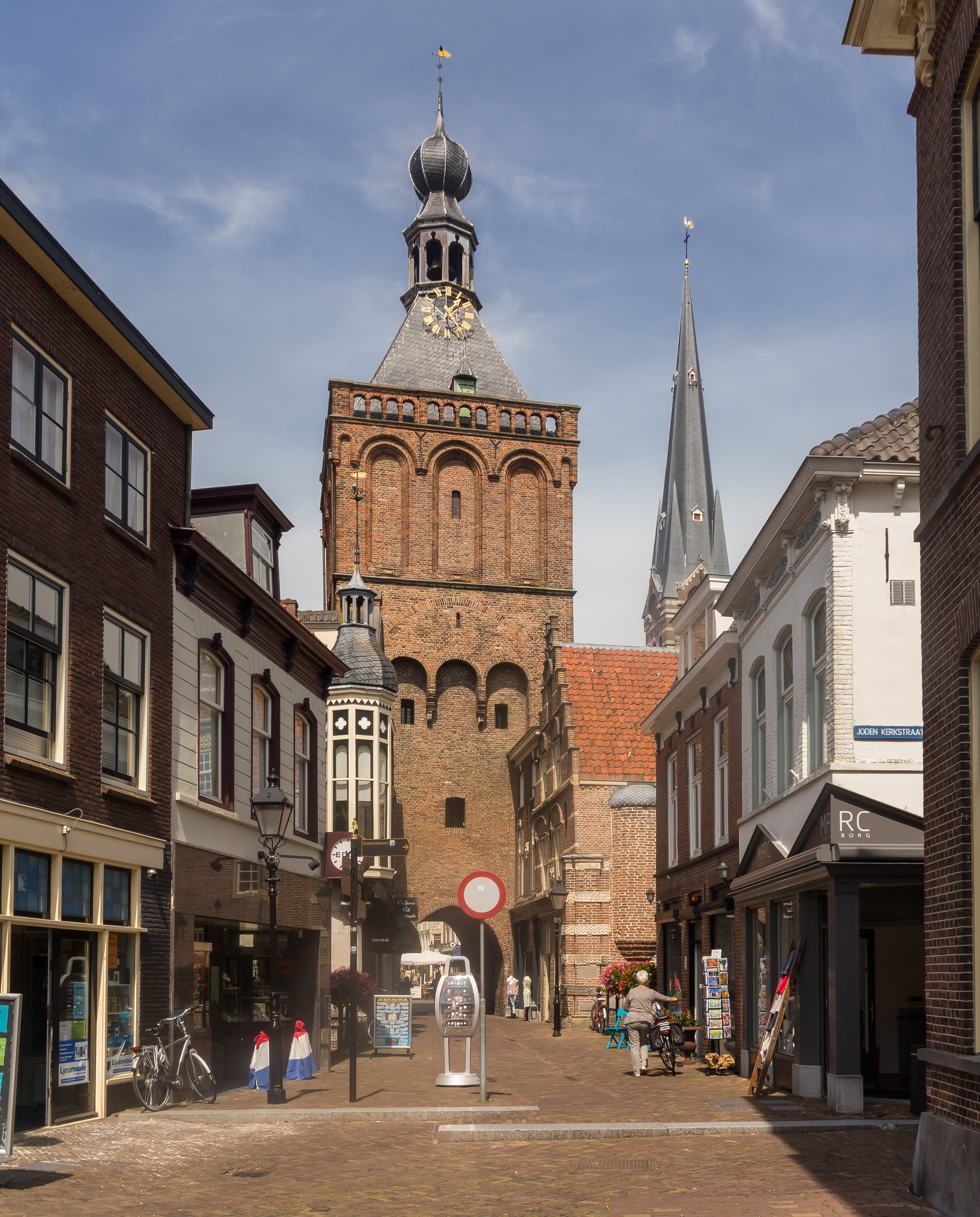
Town gate: de Binnenpoort

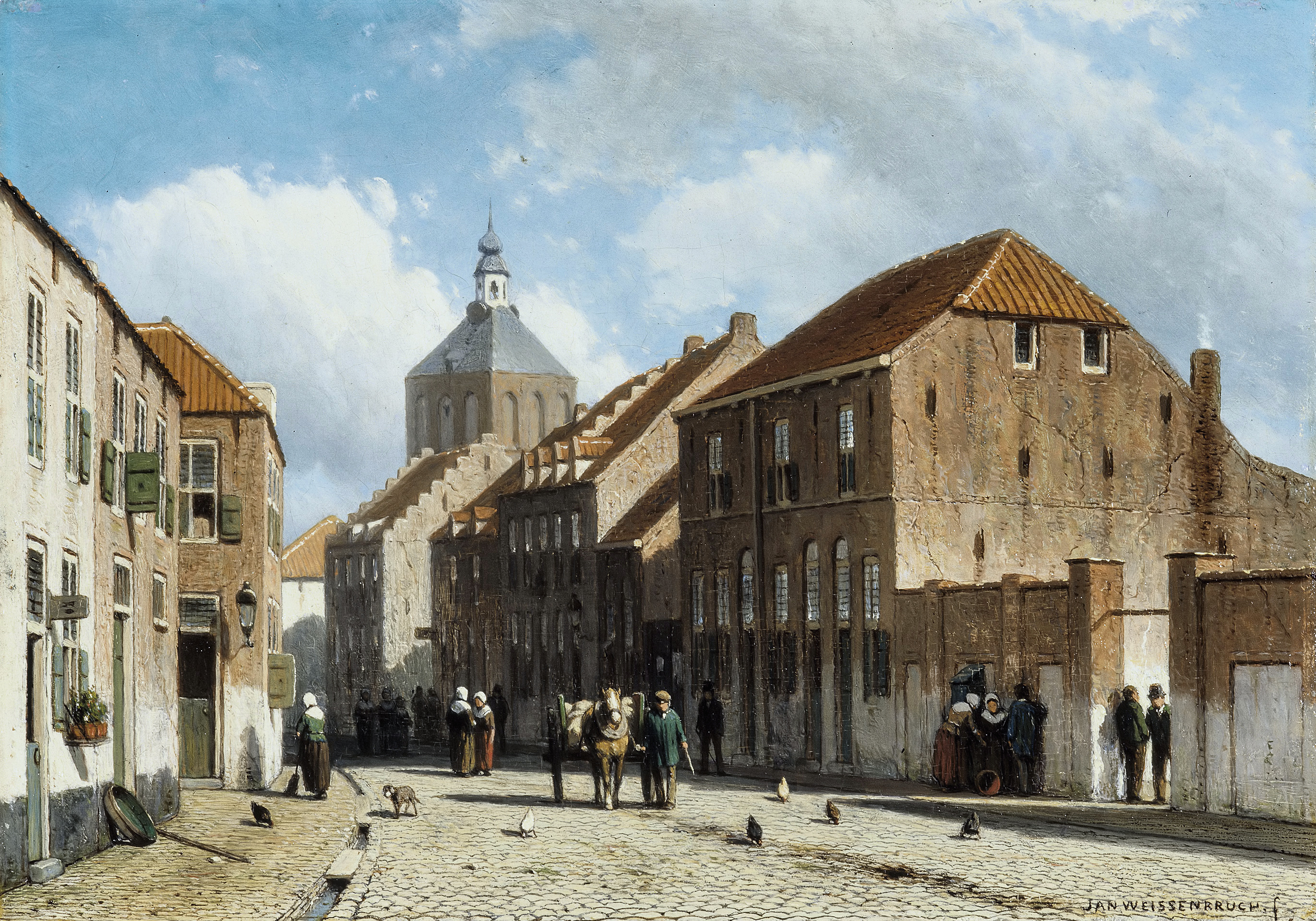
Culemborg, 1880

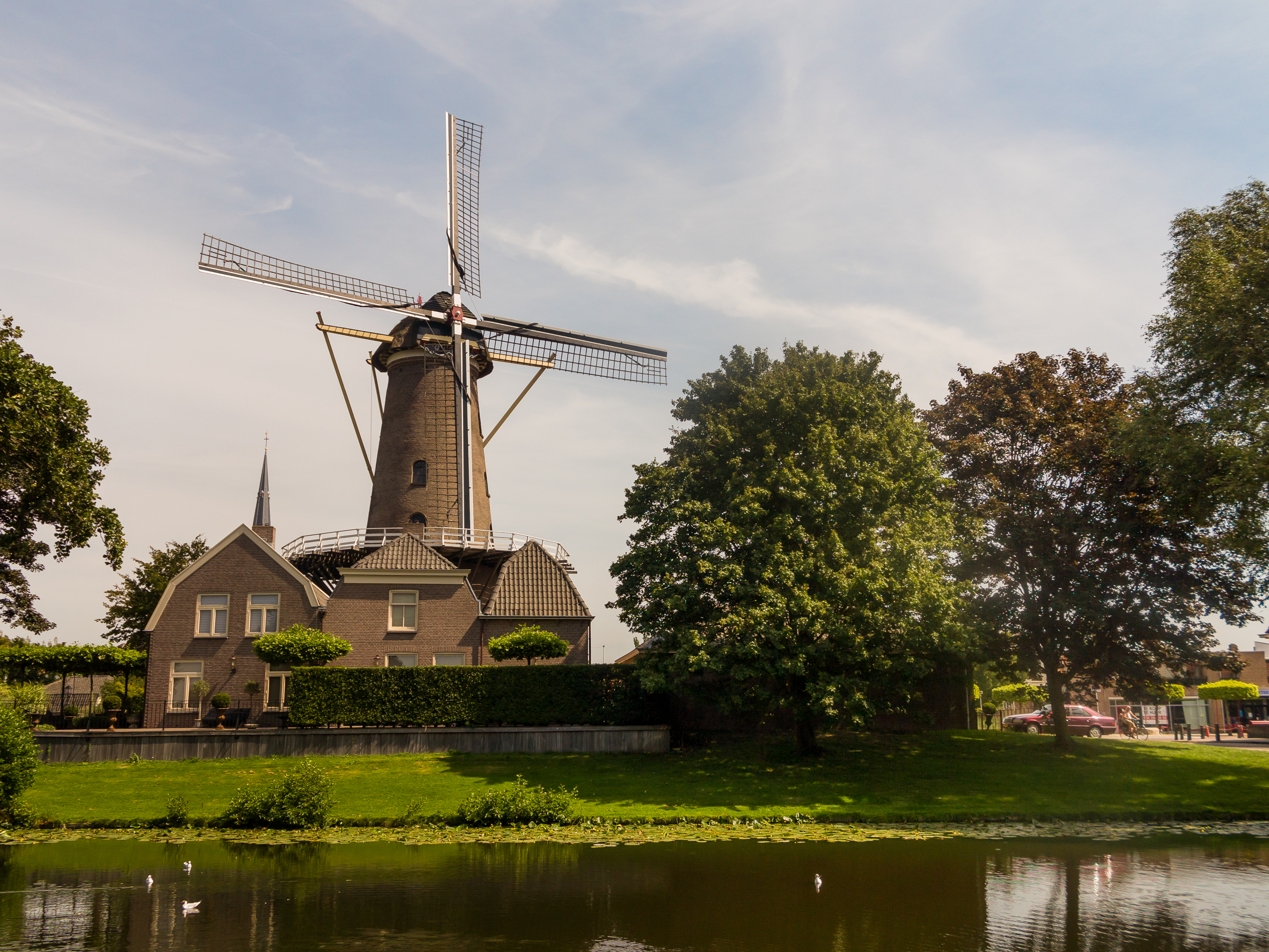
Windmill: molen de Hoop

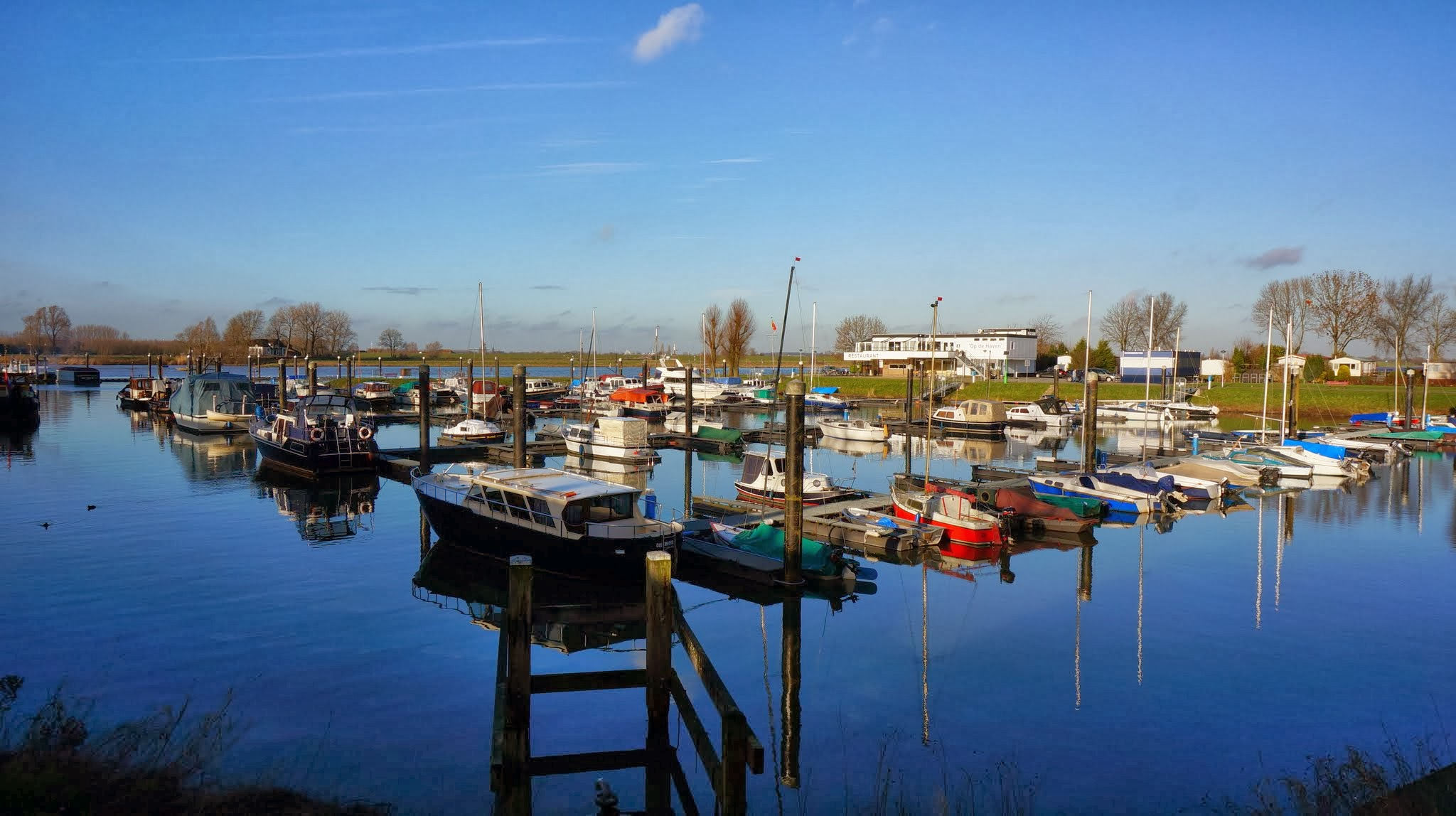
Culemborg - panorama of the harbor
