= Geldermalsen railway station =

Railway station in the Netherlands

Geldermalsen
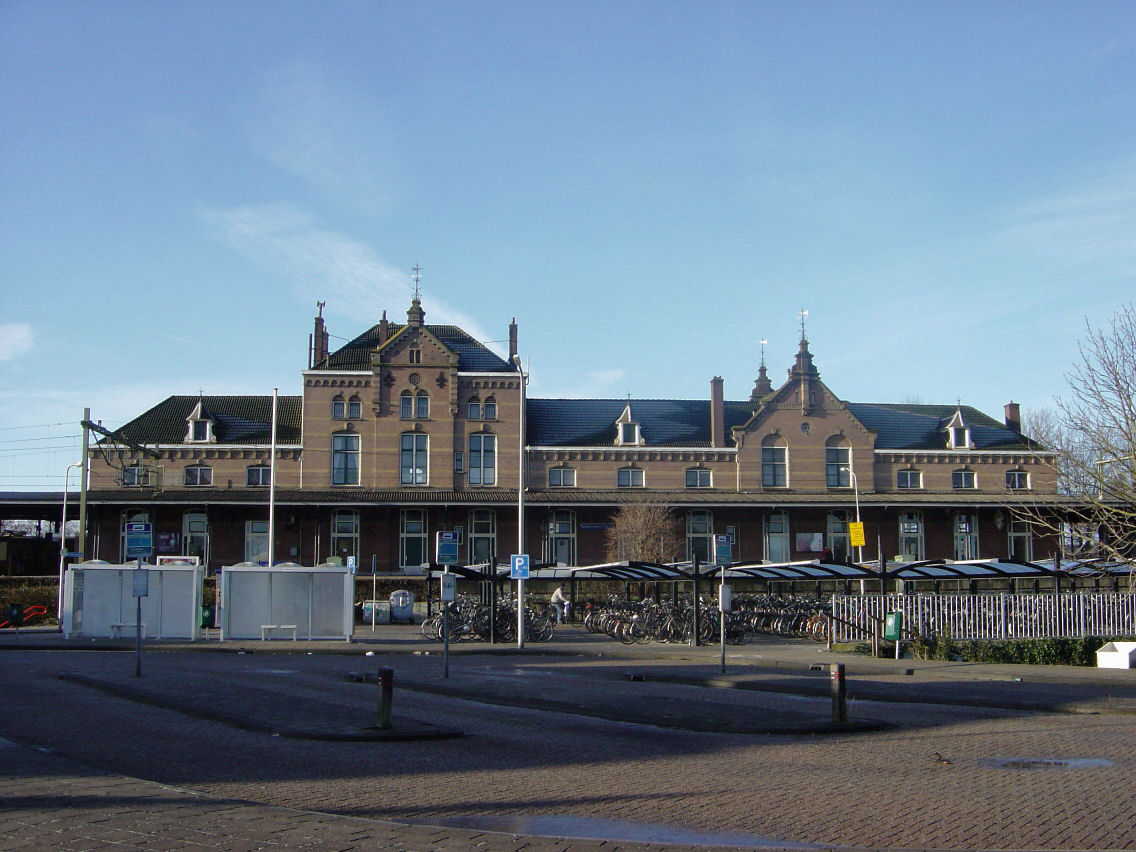
- The station building

General information
- Location: Netherlands
- Coordinates: 51°53′2″N 5°16′15″E
- Operator: Nederlandse Spoorwegen, Qbuzz
- Lines: Utrecht–Boxtel railway Elst–Dordrecht railway
- Platforms: 1
- Tracks: 4

History
- Opened: 1 Nov 1868

Services
Preceding station	Qbuzz	Following station
Beesd towards Dordrecht	Line 7200	Terminus
Preceding station	Nederlandse Spoorwegen	Following station
Culemborg towards Den Haag Centraal	NS Sprinter 6000 After 18:00 and Fri-Sun	Zaltbommel towards 's-Hertogenbosch
Culemborg towards Leiden Centraal	NS Sprinter 6700 After 18:00 and Fri-Sun	Tiel Passewaaij towards Tiel
Culemborg towards Den Haag Centraal	NS Sprinter 6900 Mon-Thur until 18:00	Tiel Passewaaij towards Tiel
Culemborg towards Leiden Centraal	NS Sprinter 8800 Mon-Thur until 18:00	Zaltbommel towards 's-Hertogenbosch
Location
- Location within Netherlands

Geldermalsen is a railway station in the town of Geldermalsen, Netherlands. The station opened on 1 Nov 1868. The station is a junction, with an island platform for easy transfers. To reach the platforms from outside of the station, passengers must use a tunnel.

The current building dates from 1884. The station is at the junction of two lines: the Utrecht–Boxtel railway and the Elst–Dordrecht railway. The station is currently served by trains from Qbuzz and NS. Previously, Arriva served this station along with NS, but on 9 Dec 2018, Qbuzz took over services from Arriva.

== Train services ==
Route	Service type	Operator	Notes
Woerden - Utrecht - Geldermalsen - Tiel	Local ("Sprinter")	NS	2x per hour
The Hague - Utrecht - Geldermalsen - 's-Hertogenbosch	Local ("Sprinter")	NS	2x per hour
Dordrecht - Gorinchem - Geldermalsen	Local ("Stoptrein")	Qbuzz	2x per hour

== Bus services ==
Line	Route	Operator	Notes
47	Geldermalsen - Meteren - Waardenburg - Haaften - Hellouw - Herwijnen - Vuren - Gorinchem	Arriva and Juijn	
260	Geldermalsen - Deil - Enspijk - Beesd - Rumpt - Rhenoy - Acquoy - Asperen - Leerdam	Arriva	On evenings and Sundays, this bus only operates if called one hour before its supposed departure ("belbus").
261	Geldermalsen - Meteren - Est	Arriva	On evenings and Sundays, this bus only operates if called one hour before its supposed departure ("belbus").
262	Geldermalsen - Buurmalsen - Tricht	Arriva	On evenings and Sundays, this bus only operates if called one hour before its supposed departure ("belbus").
543	Tiel - Geldermalsen Poppenbouwing - Geldermalsen Station	Arriva	Rush hours only, with one extra run around noon.
621	Geldermalsen → Deil → Enspijk → Gorinchem	Juijn	Only 1 run during morning rush hour.
625	Gorinchem (→ Waardenburg) → Meteren → Geldermalsen (→ Deil → Enspijk)	Juijn	Various runs on a flexible schedule, but mostly during the afternoon.
627	Gorinchem → Meteren → Geldermalsen → Deil → Enspijk	Juijn	Only 1 run during afternoon rush hour.
