= Culemborg railway bridge =

Culemborg railway bridge Kuilenburgse spoorbrug
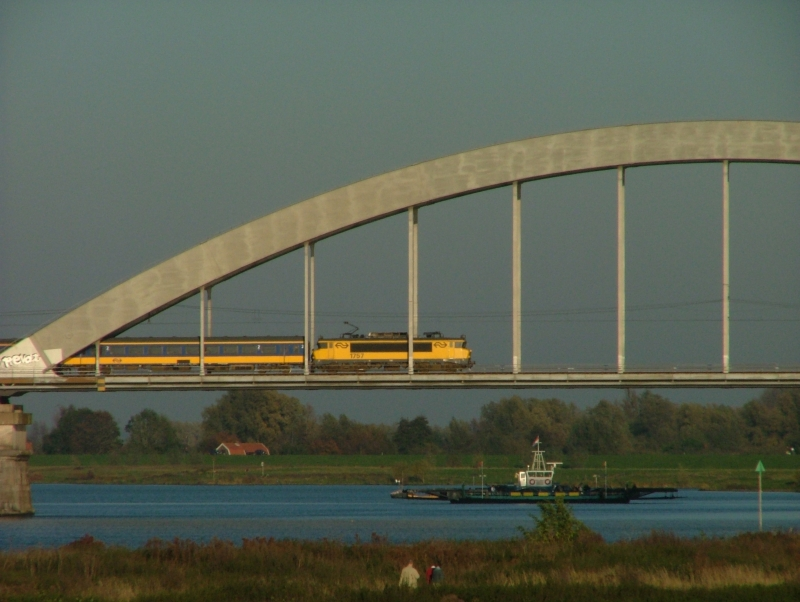
- The actual bridge (since 1983)
- Coordinates: 51°57′38″N 5°12′48″E
- Crosses: Lek
- Locale: Culemborg
- Owner: ProRail

Characteristics
- Total length: 670 m
- Height: 25 m
- Longest span: 154,4 m

History
- Construction start: January 16, 1863; 162 years ago
- Opened: April 1, 1868; 156 years ago
- Rebuilt: 1983

The Culemborg railway bridge (Dutch: Kuilenburgse spoorbrug) is a tied-arch bridge in the Netherlands over the Lek, on the Utrecht–Boxtel railway.

It held two records at the beginning: being the first important truss bridge with semi-parabolic arch and the railway-only one with the longest span in the world until 1878.

== Description ==
=== Semi-parabolic truss bridge (1868 - 1982) ===
For long time the construction of a bridge upon the Lek and other Dutch rivers was hindered by various difficulties, including ice melting.

The decision to build a bridge upon the Lek river was eventually taken in 1863 and the architect Gerrit van Diesen was put at the head of the project.

After five years, the bridge was completed and opened, together with the near railway station: it was the first great rail bridge with a semi-parabolic arch and the first important one to use the now-defined steel.

At the beginning it had only one rail, but after nearly 20 years a second one was added.

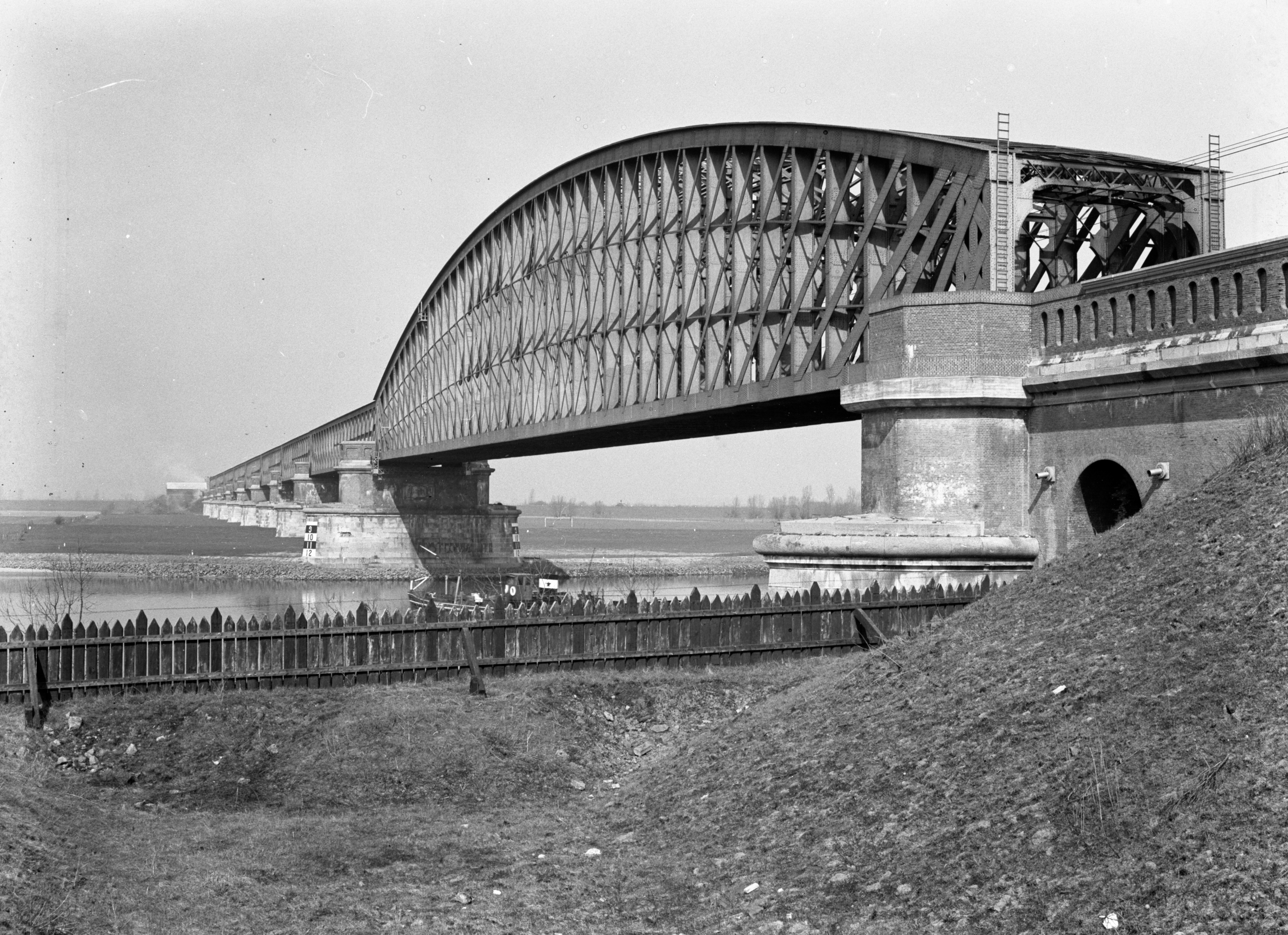
The entire old Culemborg bridge and the main span on the foreground (1953).

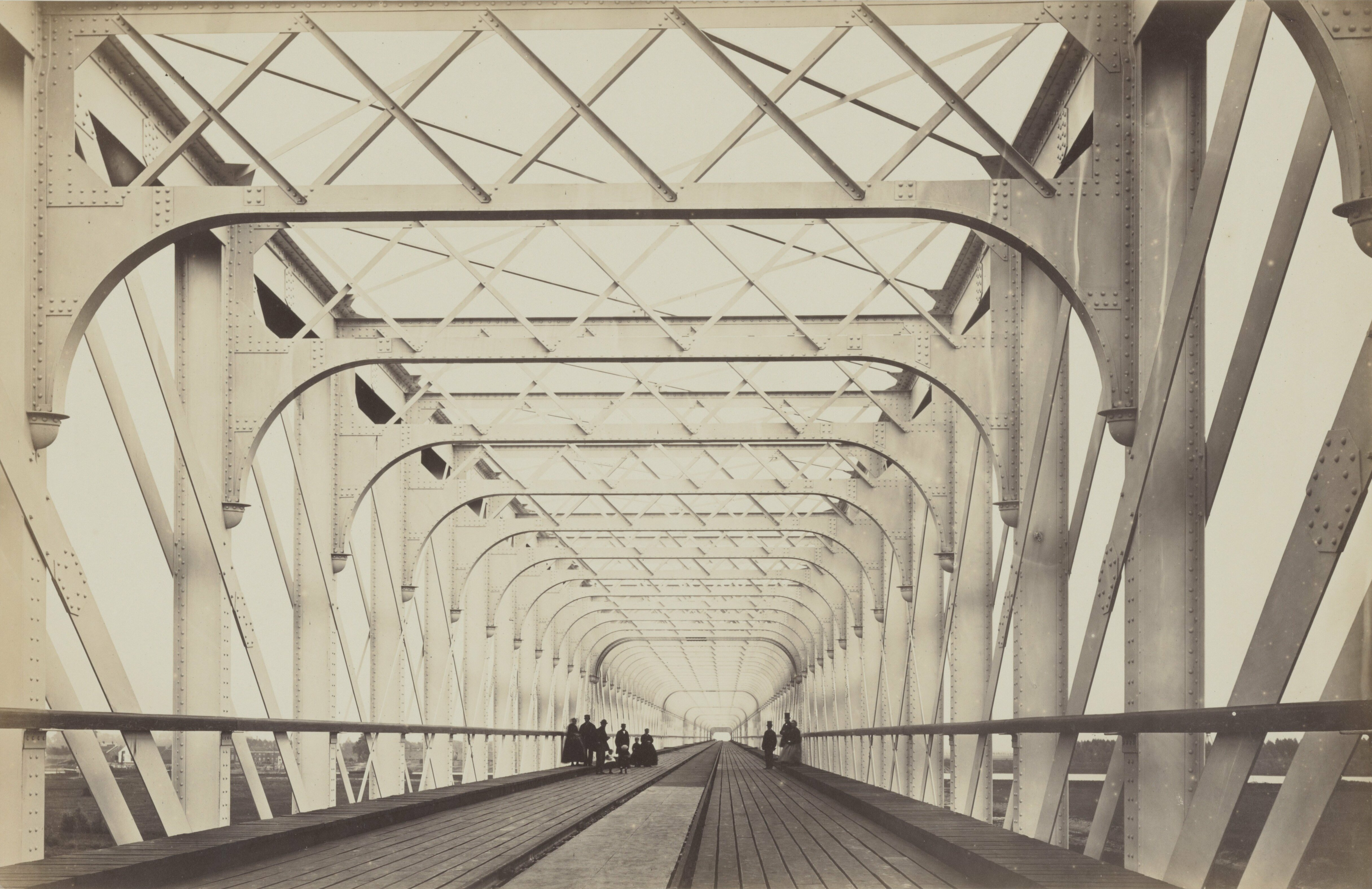
The rail bridge from the inside, at the beginning with only one rail (August 1868)

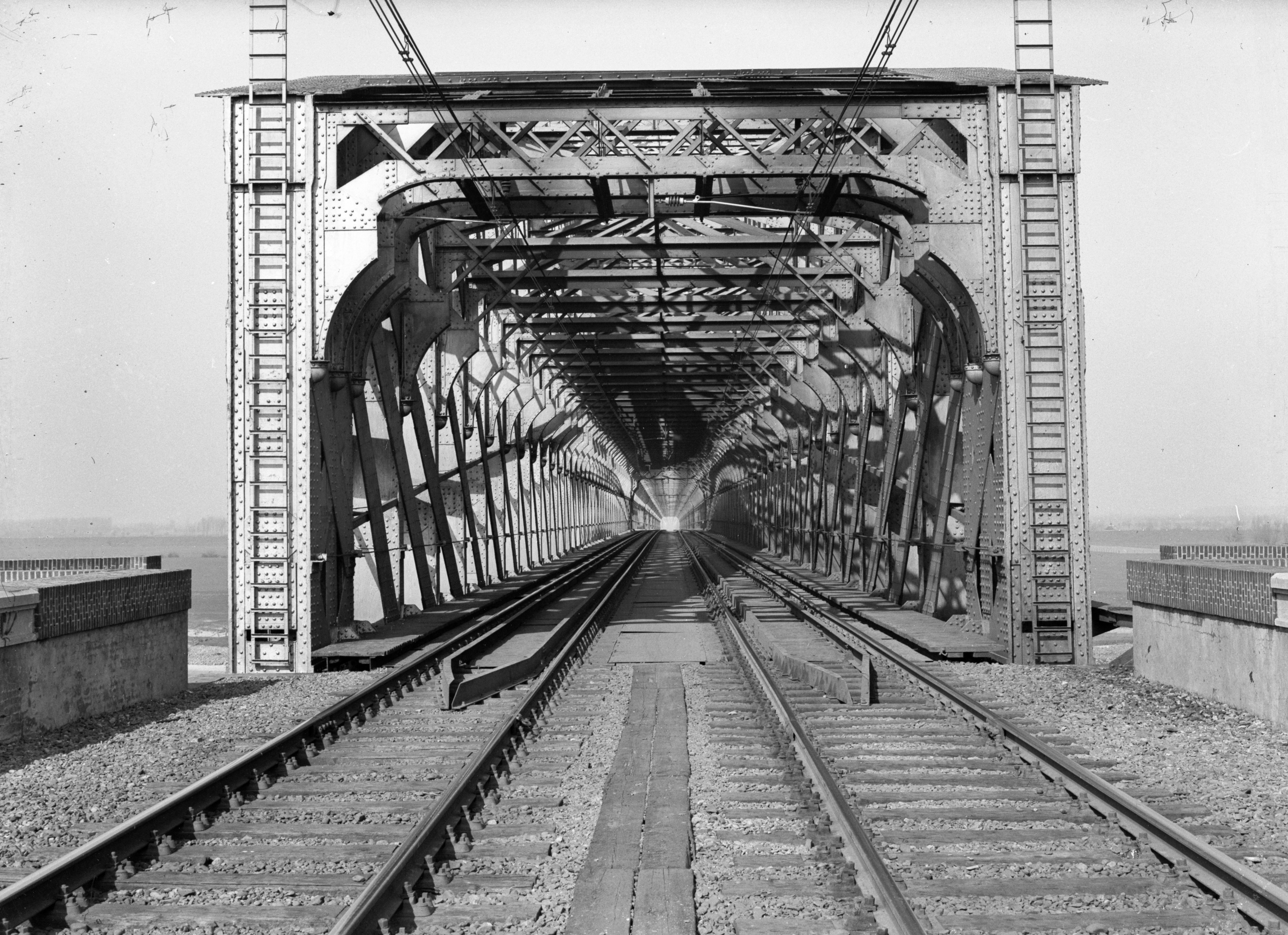
The bridge with two rails (starting from the 1880s; 1953)

=== Tied-arch bridge (since 1983) ===
At the beginning of the 1980s the old bridge was not suitable anymore for the increasing traffic in the zone, resulting in more fatigue, and the south part of it was developing some rust.

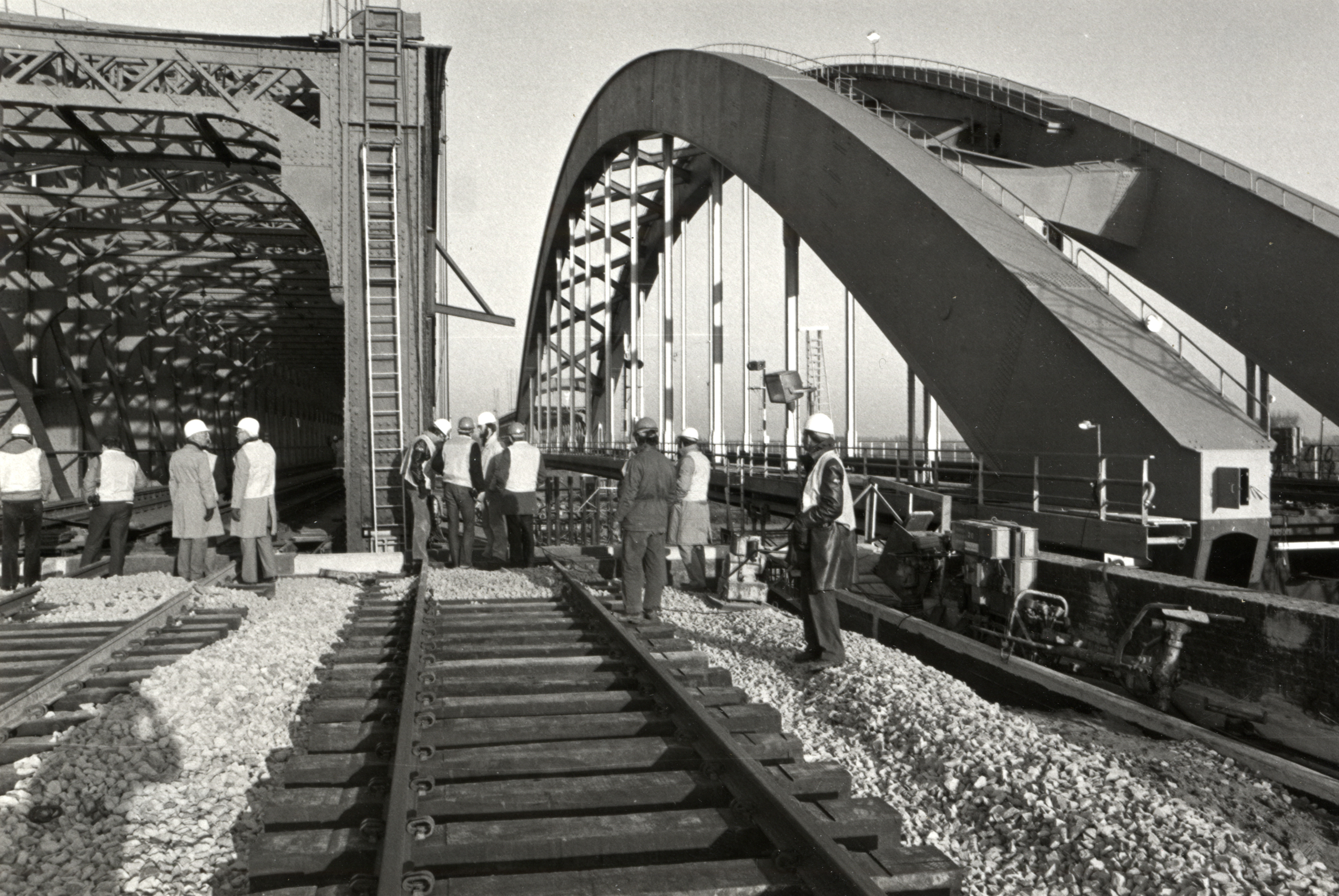
Construction of the new bridge on the right side of the old one, November 1982.

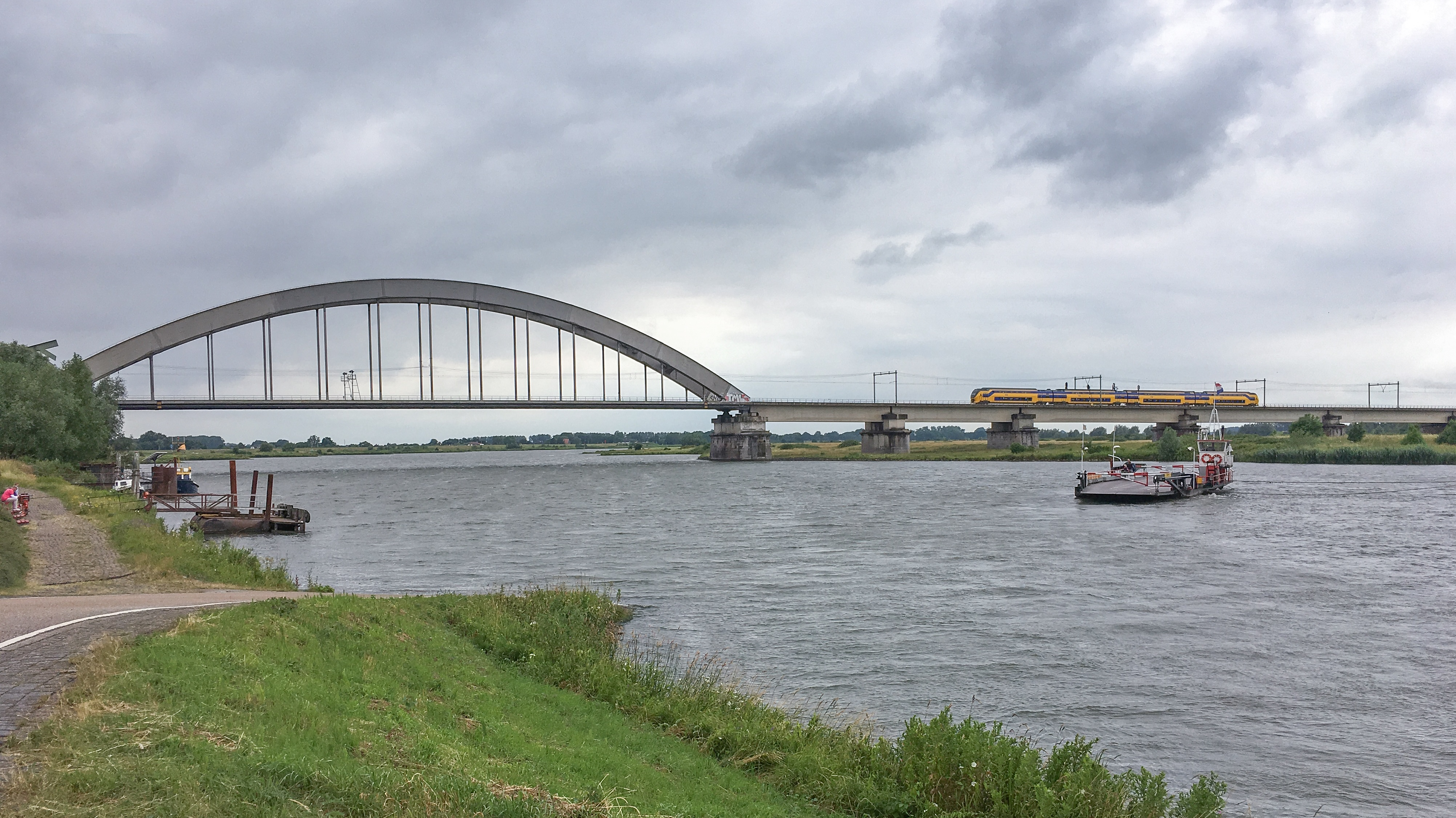
The entire new railway bridge, with the main span

== See also ==
- Culemborg railway station
- List of railway bridges and viaducts
