= De Hoop, Culemborg =

Dutch windmill

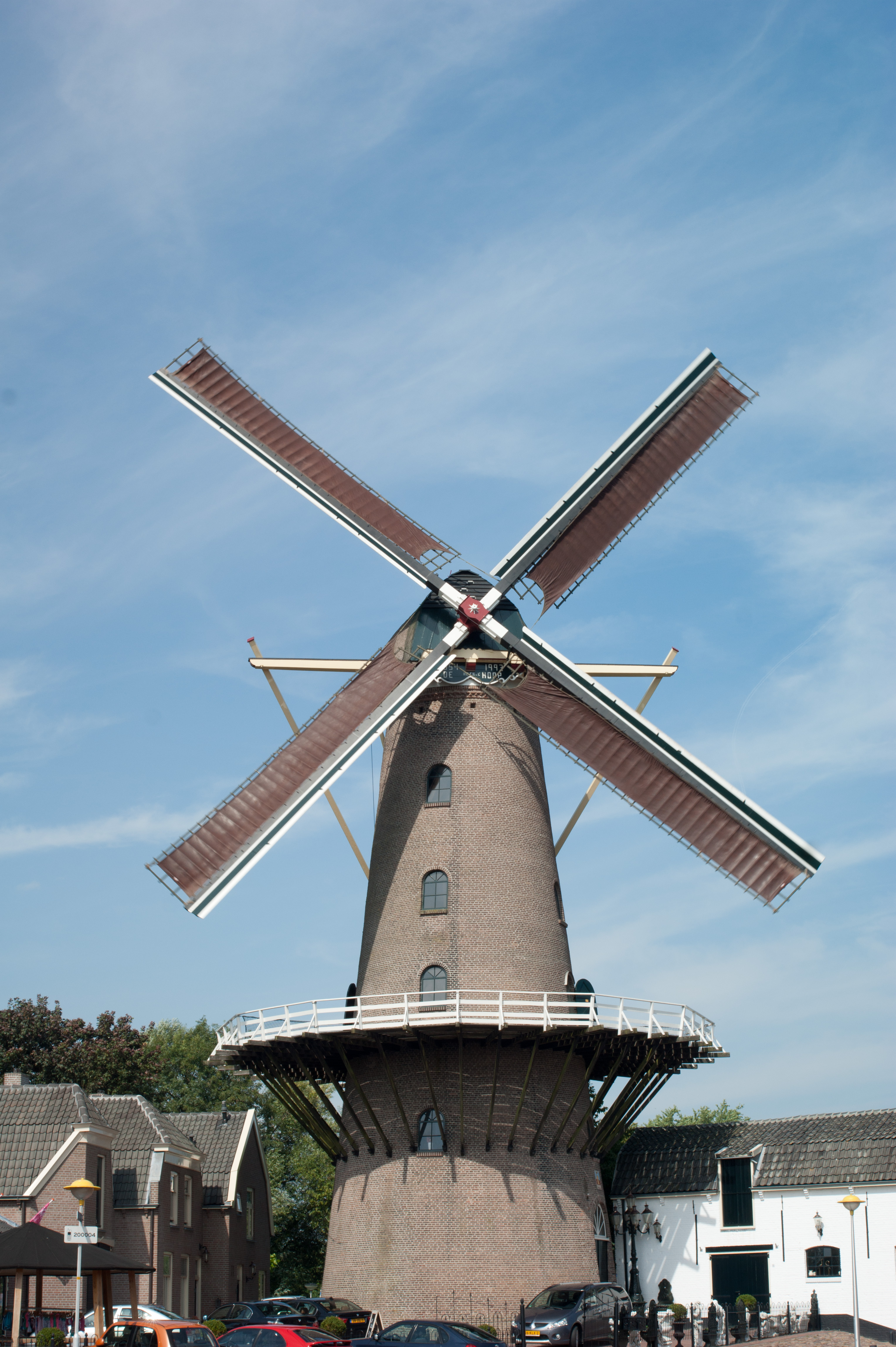
- The mill in August 2012

Origin
- Mill name: De Hoop 't Jach
- Mill location: 't Jach 3, 4101 ER, Culemborg
- Coordinates: 51°57′20″N 5°13′27″E
- Operator(s): Municipality of Culemborg
- Year built: 1854

Information
- Purpose: Corn mill
- Type: Tower mill
- Storeys: Five storeys
- No. of sails: Four sails
- Type of sails: Common sails
- Windshaft: Cast iron
- Winding: Tailpole and winch
- No. of pairs of millstones: Two pairs
- Size of millstones: 1.40 metres (4 ft 7 in) diameter

De Hoop (English: The Hope) or 't Jach is a tower mill in Culemborg, Gelderland, Netherlands which was built in 1845 and has been restored to working order. The mill is listed as a Rijksmonument.

== History ==
There was a mill on the site in the 16th century, and possibly earlier. It was a post mill. It and the mill outside the Lekpoort were mills where the inhabitants were compelled to have their grain ground. Both mills belonged to the Count of Culemborg. In 1689, the mill was rebuilt for ƒ750. The mill was shown on a 1749 map of the City and County off Culemborg. A horse powered oil mill had been built on the site in 1757. It was demolished c. 1833; a potato factory was built on the site in that year. There was a failure of the potato harvest in 1845 and the factory is not mentioned after 1848. In 1853, permission was granted for the erection of a windmill on the site.

De Hoop was built in 1854. The cap and sails were removed c. 1910 and thereafter it was worked by steam engine. The mill tower was later stripped of its machinery. In the 1960s, the mill was the clubhouse of the Culemborg Harley-Davidson Club. Circa 1980, the empty mill tower was purchased by the Gemeente Culemborg. Restoration was carried out in stages, culminating in the mill returning to working order in 1993. Machinery from De Oranjemolen, Lewedorp, Zeeland was incorporated, and a new windshaft was cast. That mill had been demolished c. 1990, with parts also going to assist the restoration of Leonardus, Maastricht, Limburg. De Hoop is listed as a Rijksmonument, № 451862.

== Description ==
De Hoop is what the Dutch call a "Stellingmolen". It is a five storey tower mill with a stage, which is 8.45 metres (27 ft 9 in) above ground level. The cap is thatched. Winding is by tailpole and winch. The sails are Common sails. They have a span of 26.10 metres (85 ft 8 in). They are carried on a cast iron windshaft, which was cast by the Gieterij Hardinxveld in 1993. The windshaft also carries the brake wheel, which has 65 cogs. This drives a lantern pinion wallower with 30 staves, which is situated at the top of the upright shaft. At the bottom of the upright shaft is the great spur wheel, which has 100 cogs. This drives a pair of 1.40 metres (4 ft 7 in) Cullen millstones via a lantern pinion stone nut with 24 staves and a pair of 1.40 metres (4 ft 7 in) French Burr millstones via a lantern pinion stone nut with 30 staves.

== Public access ==
De Hoop is open on Saturdays from 10:00 to 16:00.
