= Lanxmeer =

Coordinates: 51°56′54″N 5°13′59″E

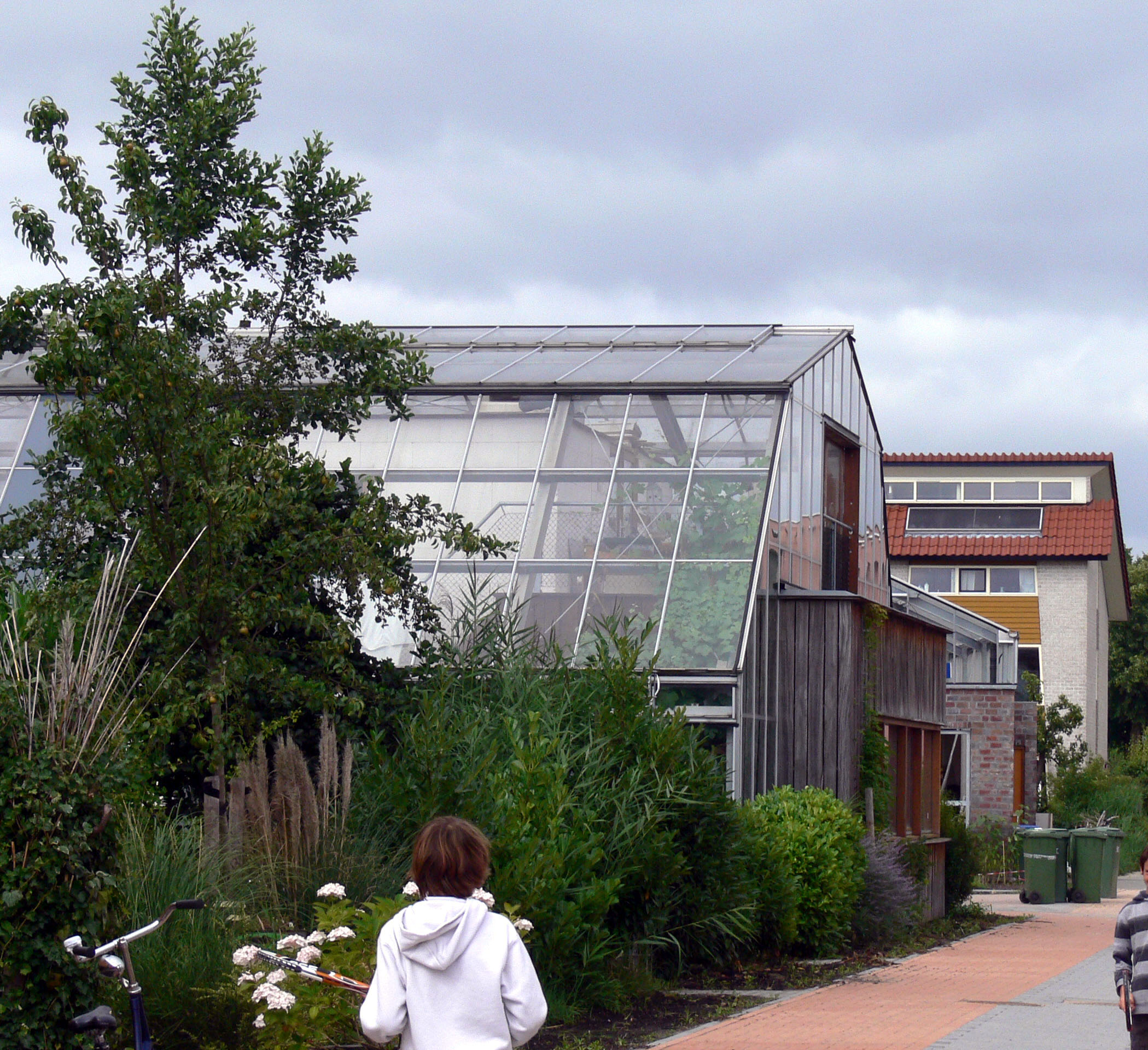
A greenhouse in Lanxmeer

Lanxmeer is the name of an ecological neighbourhood (240 houses) built from 1994 to 2009 in the town of Culemborg in the Netherlands. It is an environmentally friendly housing development.

It was initiated by Marleen Kaptein, who was looking for a more sustainable way of building housing in urban areas. The project was a strong partnership between future inhabitants and the city of Culemborg, consultants and other people.

It incorporates many of the principles of high environmental quality and eco-towns, but its principal originality is the promotion of the constant participation of the inhabitants. Indeed, this neighbourhood (except for its masterplan) was designed and conducted with representatives of future residents in a creative process (bottom-up; from bottom to top and not imposed by management or administration), and is often regarded as a model in several areas (for example in Europe by Energie-Cités and in France by the Department of Ecology, Energy, Sustainable Development and Sea). It has therefore become an international reference, regularly visited by architects, urbans planners, developers, futurists or groups interested in sustainability, from European countries, and sometimes the United States, Japan, etc..

== Creation of the project ==
In 1990, Marleen Kaptein believed that creating neighbourhoods with the inhabitants was both possible and necessary. She gathered a group of people motivated to create the project. She thought that a critical threshold of 200 to 400 houses must be reached. To do it, they needed land of more than 20ha (49.4 acres). After that she created a foundation called the International Forum Mann and foundation structures to promote organic architecture and she gathered a group of friends which included various scientists and university intellectuals with the goal of creating a city or a district they would dream to live in.

== Name ==
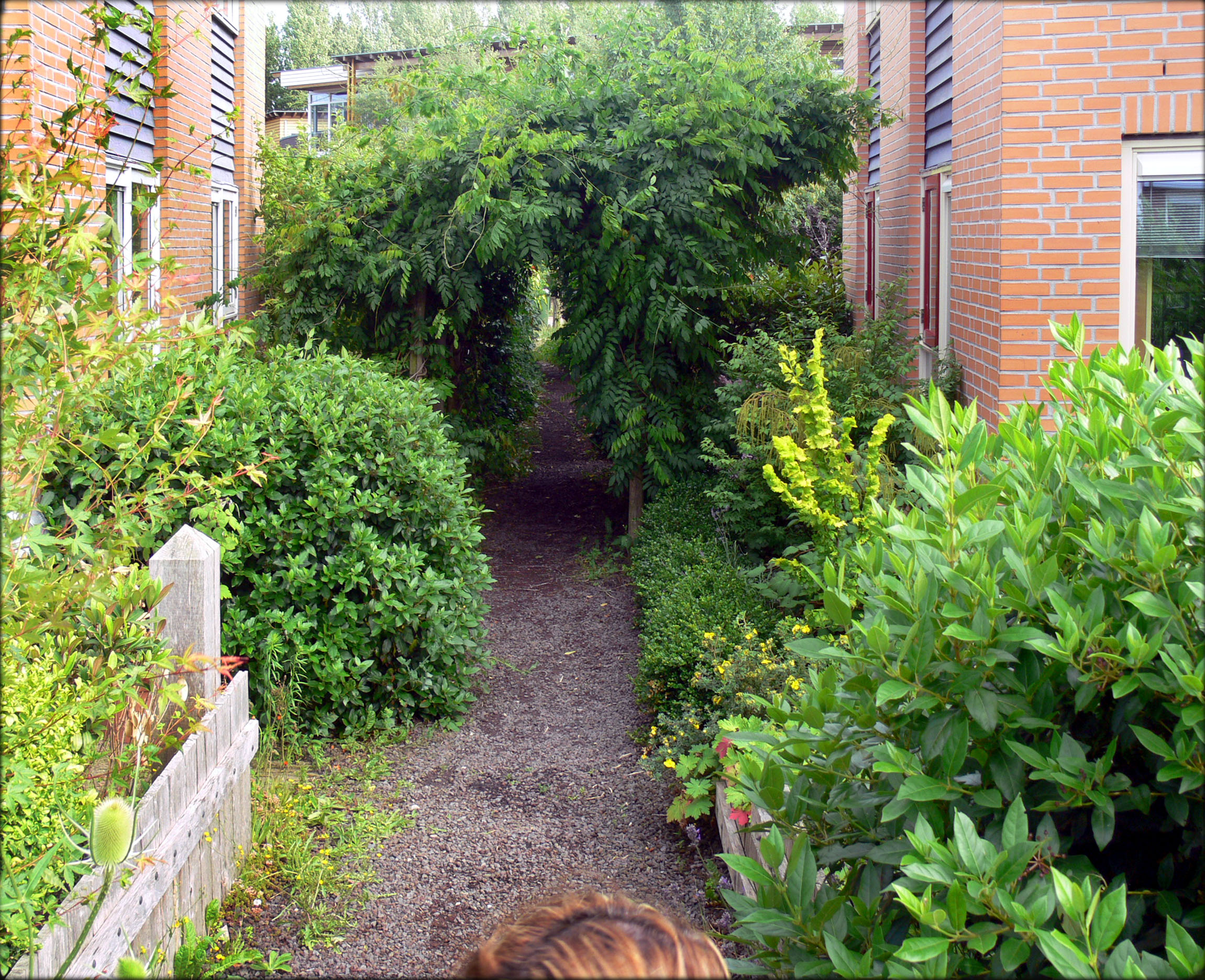
A path in Lanxmeer

Lanxmeer is the name of the neighbourhood, which lies in an area that was once a land reclamation area with a settlement called Lanxmeer. The residents association of modern-day Lanxmeer is called EVA-Lanxmeer. It originates from an information centre (Dutch: "Ecologisch Centrum voor Educatie, Voorlichting en Advies") made to promote integration of ecology in architecture and town.

== See also ==
- Energy efficiency in British housing
- Passive solar building design
- BioRegional
