= Utrecht–Boxtel railway =

Railway line in the Netherlands

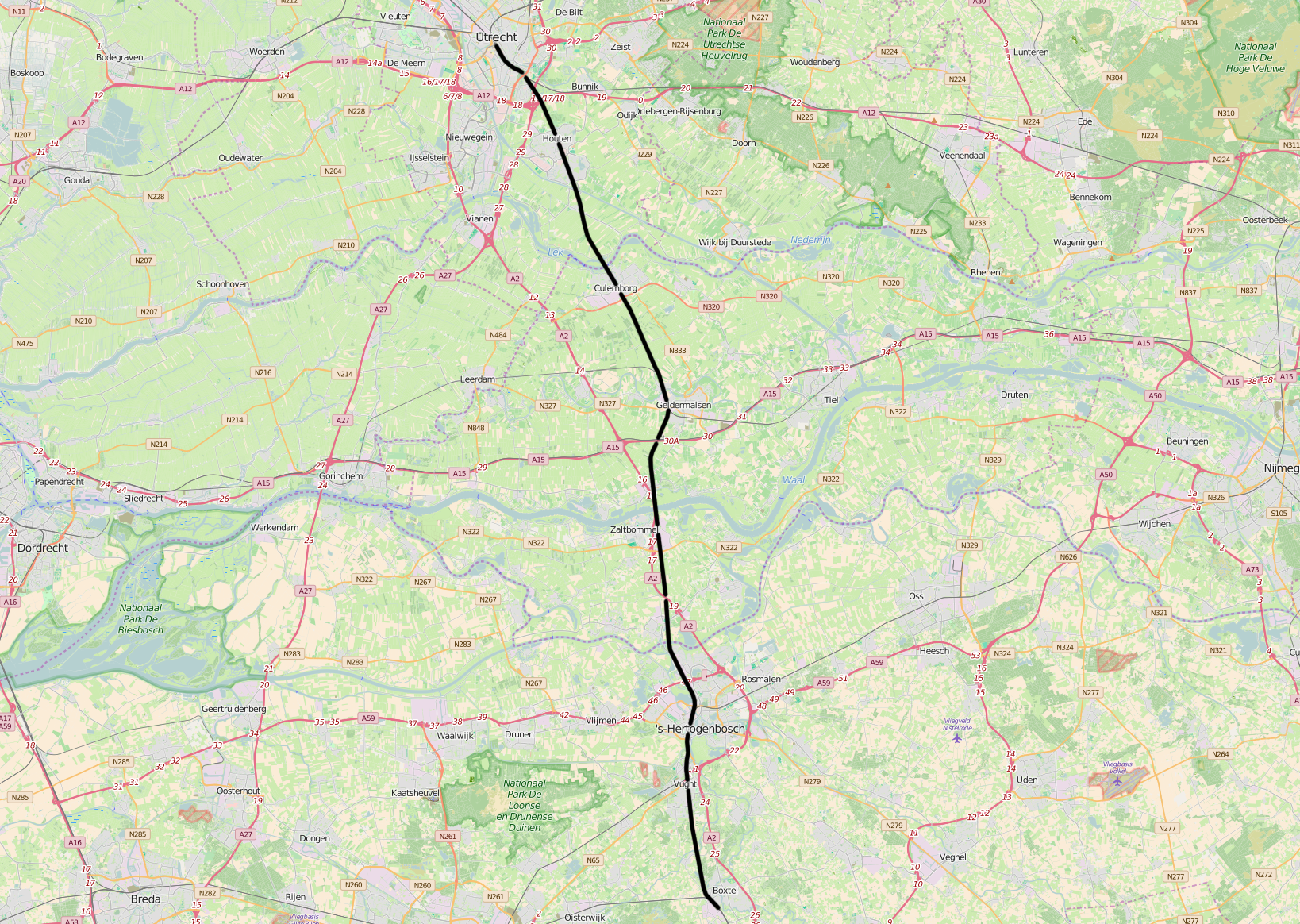

Overview
- Status: Operational
- Locale: Netherlands
- Termini: Utrecht Centraal railway station; Boxtel railway station

Service
- Operator: Nederlandse Spoorwegen

History
- Opened: 1868–1870

Technical
- Line length: 60 km (37 mi)
- Number of tracks: double track
- Track gauge: 1,435 mm (4 ft 8 1/2 in) standard gauge
- Electrification: 1.5 kV DC

The Utrecht–Boxtel railway is a railway in the Netherlands running from Utrecht Centraal station to Boxtel station, passing through Geldermalsen station and 's-Hertogenbosch station. The southern section of the line (between Boxtel and 's-Hertogenbosch) opened in 1868, and the northern section (between 's-Hertogenbosch and Utrecht) opened in 1870. It is also known as the Staatslijn "H".

== Stations ==
The main interchange stations on the Utrecht–Boxtel railway are:

- Utrecht Centraal: to Amsterdam, Leiden, The Hague, Amersfoort, Arnhem and Rotterdam
- Geldermalsen: to Dordrecht and Tiel
- 's-Hertogenbosch: to Tilburg and Nijmegen
- Boxtel: to Tilburg and Eindhoven

== See also ==
- Culemborg railway bridge
