= Utrecht railway station =

Utrecht railway station may refer to:

- Utrecht Centraal railway station
- Utrecht Lunetten railway station
- Utrecht Overvecht railway station
- Utrecht Terwijde railway station
- Utrecht Zuilen railway station
