= Vleuten railway station =

Railway station in the Netherlands

Vleuten
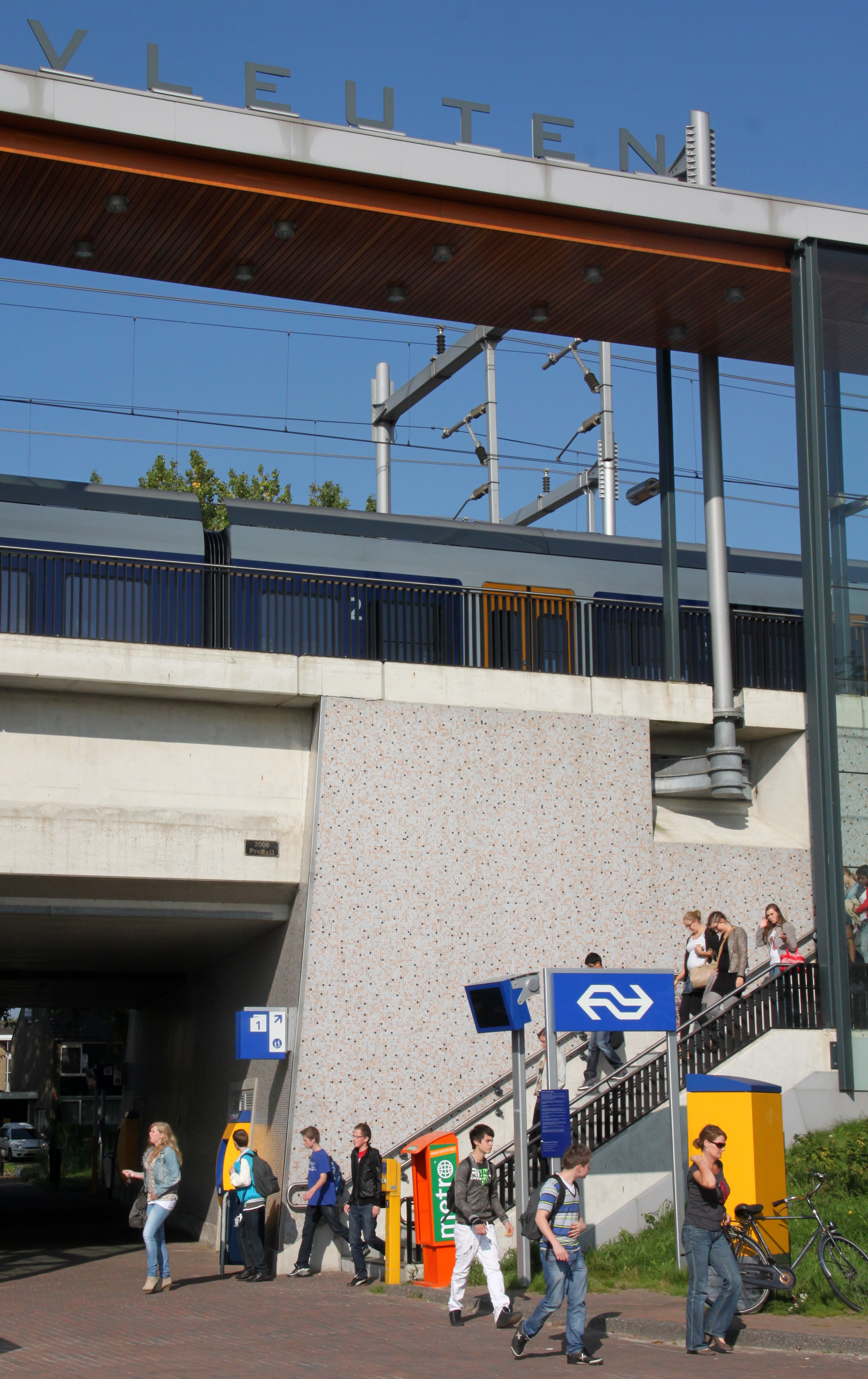

General information
- Location: Netherlands
- Coordinates: 52°6′11″N 5°0′43″E
- Line: Utrecht–Rotterdam railway

History
- Opened: 1881
- Closed: November 3, 2007 (reopened on November 5, 2007, new trainstation and a different location)

Services
Preceding station	Nederlandse Spoorwegen	Following station
Woerden towards Den Haag Centraal	NS Sprinter 6000 After 18:00 and Fri-Sun	Utrecht Terwijde towards 's-Hertogenbosch
Woerden towards Den Haag Centraal	NS Sprinter 6900 Mon-Thur until 18:00	Utrecht Terwijde towards Tiel
Woerden Terminus	NS Sprinter 8900 Mon-Fri midday	Utrecht Terwijde towards Utrecht Centraal
Woerden towards Leiden Centraal	NS Sprinter 8900 Mon-Fri Peak	Utrecht Terwijde towards Utrecht Centraal
Location
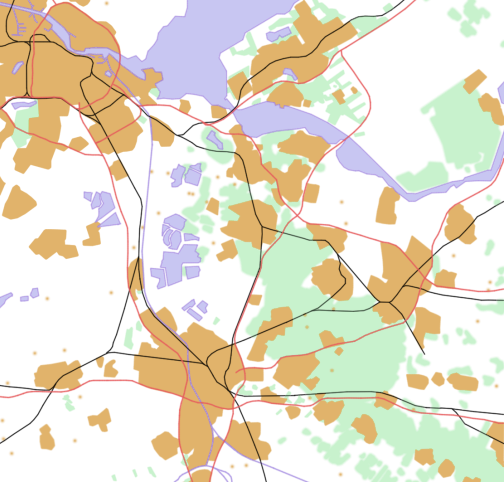
- Location within Northeastern Randstad

Vleuten is a railway station located in Vleuten, Utrecht, Netherlands. The station was opened in 1881, and is located on the Utrecht–Rotterdam railway. The train services are operated by Nederlandse Spoorwegen.

== Train services ==
The following services currently call at Vleuten:

- 2x per hour local service (sprinter) The Hague - Gouda - Utrecht
- 2x per hour local service (sprinter) Woerden - Utrecht

== Bus Services ==
- 28 (Station Vleuten - Vleuterweide - De Meern - Leidsche Rijn - Utrecht Centraal - Utrecht Science Park)
- 29 (Station Vleuten - Vleuterweide West - De Meern - Papendorp - Kanaleneiland - Station Vaartsche Rijn - Utrecht Science Park)
- 111 (Station Vleuten - Haarzuilens)
- 126 (Station Maarssen - Vleuten - Station Vleuten - De Meern)
- 127 (Kockengen - Haarzuilens - Vleuten - Station Vleuten - De Meern)
