= Capelle Schollevaar railway station =

Railway station in the Netherlands

Capelle Schollevaar
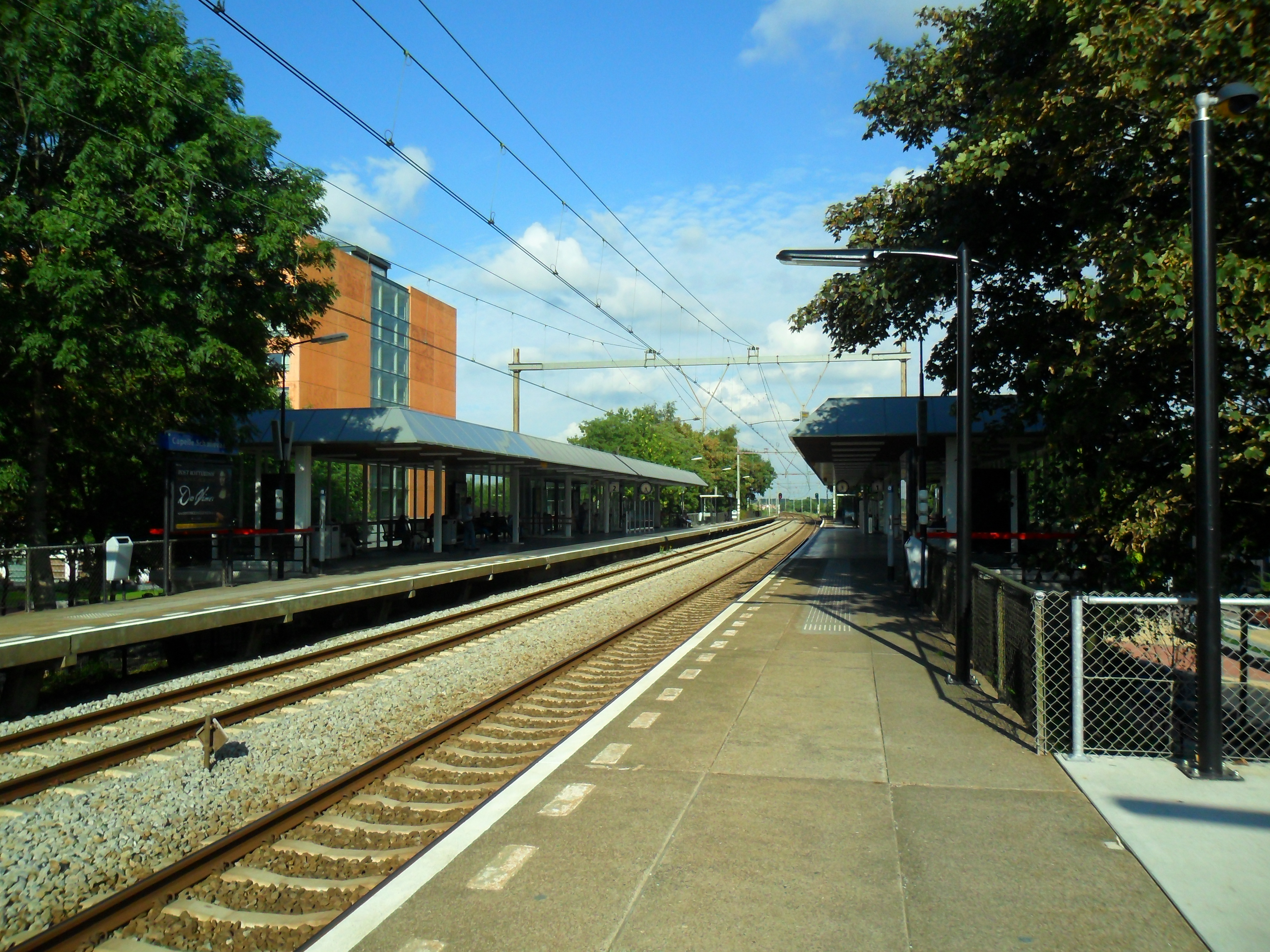

General information
- Location: Netherlands
- Coordinates: 51°57′12″N 4°35′3″E
- Operator: Nederlandse Spoorwegen
- Line: Utrecht–Rotterdam railway
- Platforms: 2

Other information
- Station code: Cps

History
- Opened: 1981

Services
Preceding station	Nederlandse Spoorwegen	Following station
Rotterdam Alexander towards Rotterdam Centraal	NS Sprinter 4000	Nieuwerkerk aan den IJssel towards Uitgeest
Location
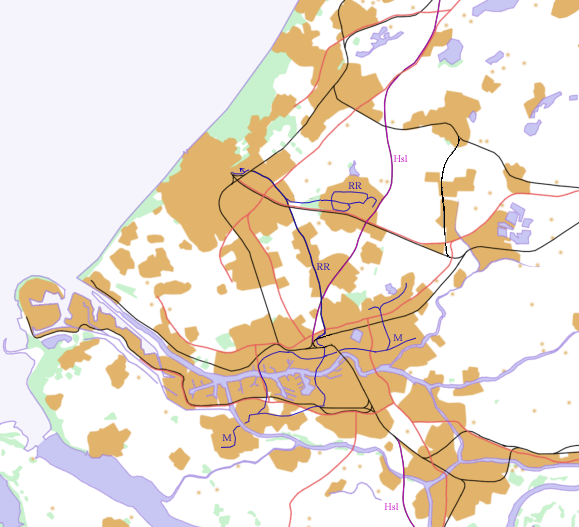
- Location within Southwest Randstad Location within Netherlands

The Capelle Schollevaar railway station, also known as Capelle Schollevaer, is a railway station in Capelle aan den IJssel, Netherlands, located on the Utrecht–Rotterdam railway between Rotterdam and Gouda. The railway station was opened in 1981 and has two platforms; it is located near to the "Picasso Passage" shopping mall.

== Train services ==
The following services call at Capelle Schollevaar:

- 2x per hour local service (sprinter) Uitgeest - Amsterdam - Woerden - Rotterdam
- 2x per hour local service (sprinter) Rotterdam - Gouda Goverwelle
