= NWK =

NWK may refer to:

- Nwk, the Newick tree file format (See List of file formats#Biology)
- Nieuwerkerk aan den IJssel railway station, the station code Nwk
- Wilmington/Newark Line, the SEPTA line between Newark, Delaware and Center City Philadelphia
- Wicklesgreuth station, the DS100 code NWK
- Network Limited, the ASX code NWK
- Newark Penn Station
