= Maarssen railway station =

Railway station in the Netherlands

Maarssen
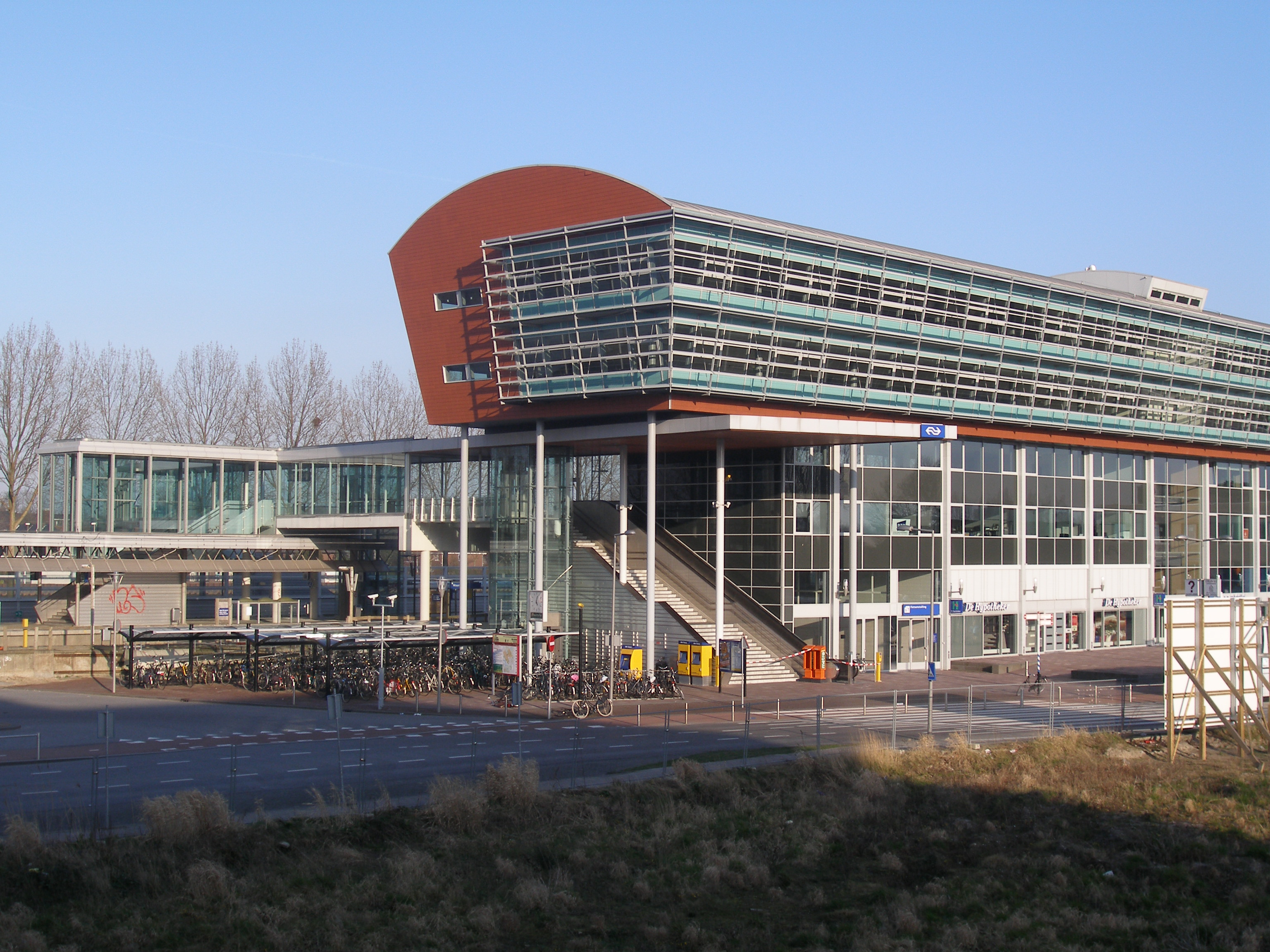

General information
- Location: Netherlands
- Coordinates: 52°08′09″N 5°01′59″E
- Line: Amsterdam–Arnhem railway

History
- Opened: 18 December 1843

Services
Preceding station	Nederlandse Spoorwegen	Following station
Breukelen Terminus	NS Sprinter 7300	Utrecht Zuilen towards Rhenen
Breukelen towards Uitgeest	NS Sprinter 7400 Peak hours only	Utrecht Zuilen towards Driebergen-Zeist
Location
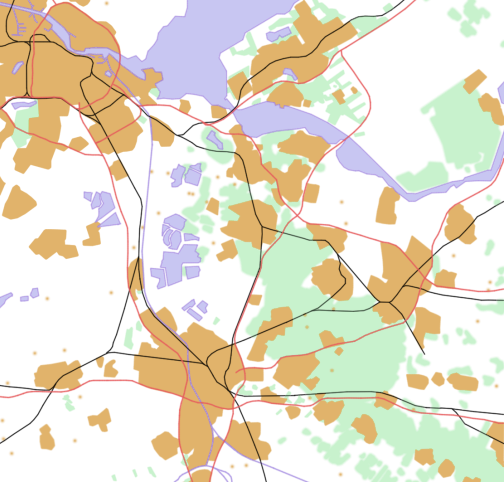
- Location within Northeastern Randstad

Maarssen is a railway station in Maarssenbroek and on the opposite side of the Amsterdam Rijnkanaal to Maarssen, Netherlands. The station opened on 18 December 1843 and is located on the Amsterdam–Arnhem railway. The services are operated by Nederlandse Spoorwegen.

In 1953 the station was served by two trains to and from Amsterdam per day. The service improved in the 1970s following the building of Maarssenbroek, and in 1974 the station had an hourly service. In 1975 the station had a half-hourly service.

A (fourth) new station building was built in 2004. In a 2005 survey approximately 5,523 passengers use this station per day.

== Train services ==
The following services currently call at Maarssen:

- 2x per hour local service (sprinter) Amsterdam - Utrecht - Rhenen
- 2x per hour local service (sprinter) Breukelen - Utrecht - Veenendaal Centrum

== Bus services ==
The following bus services depart from the bus station outside the station:

- 32 - Station Maarssen - Maarssenbroek - Maarssen - Rijnsweerd - De Uithof (University) / AZU (Hospital) (3x per day - Peak Hours)
- 34 - Station Maarssen - - Maarssen - Utrecht Centraal (2x per hour, Line 34 do's morning around 5:00 / 7:00 and afternoon around 18:00 rides all day on Saturday and Sunday Same route as Line 36)
- 36 - Station Maarssen - Maarssen - Utrecht Centraal (4x per hour, Line 34 do's morning around 5:00 / 7:00 and afternoon around 18:00 rides all day on Saturday and Sunday)
- 37 - Station Maarssen - Maarssenbroek - Utrecht North-West - Utrecht Centraal (4x per hour, 2x per hour on Sundays)
- 38 - Station Maarssen - Maarssenbroek - Utrecht North-West - Utrecht Centraal (4x per hour, Not Sundays)
- 39 - Station Maarssen - Maarssenbroek - Utrecht West (Near Station Utrecht Terwijde) - Utrecht Centraal (2x per hour)
- 48 - Station Maarssen - Lage Weide - Nieuwegein - Houten
- 126 - Station Maarssen - Vleuten - De Meern (1x per hour - Only Monday - Friday)
- 420 - Utrecht Centraal -> Vleuten -> Station Maarssen -> Breukelen -> Loenen aan de Vecht -> Utrecht Centraal 3x per night (only Friday night)
- 532 - Station Maarssen - Maarssenbroek - Utrecht Centraal (FC-Utrecht Express)

All Bus Services, are operated by the U-OV - Utrecht Municipal.

== Gallery ==
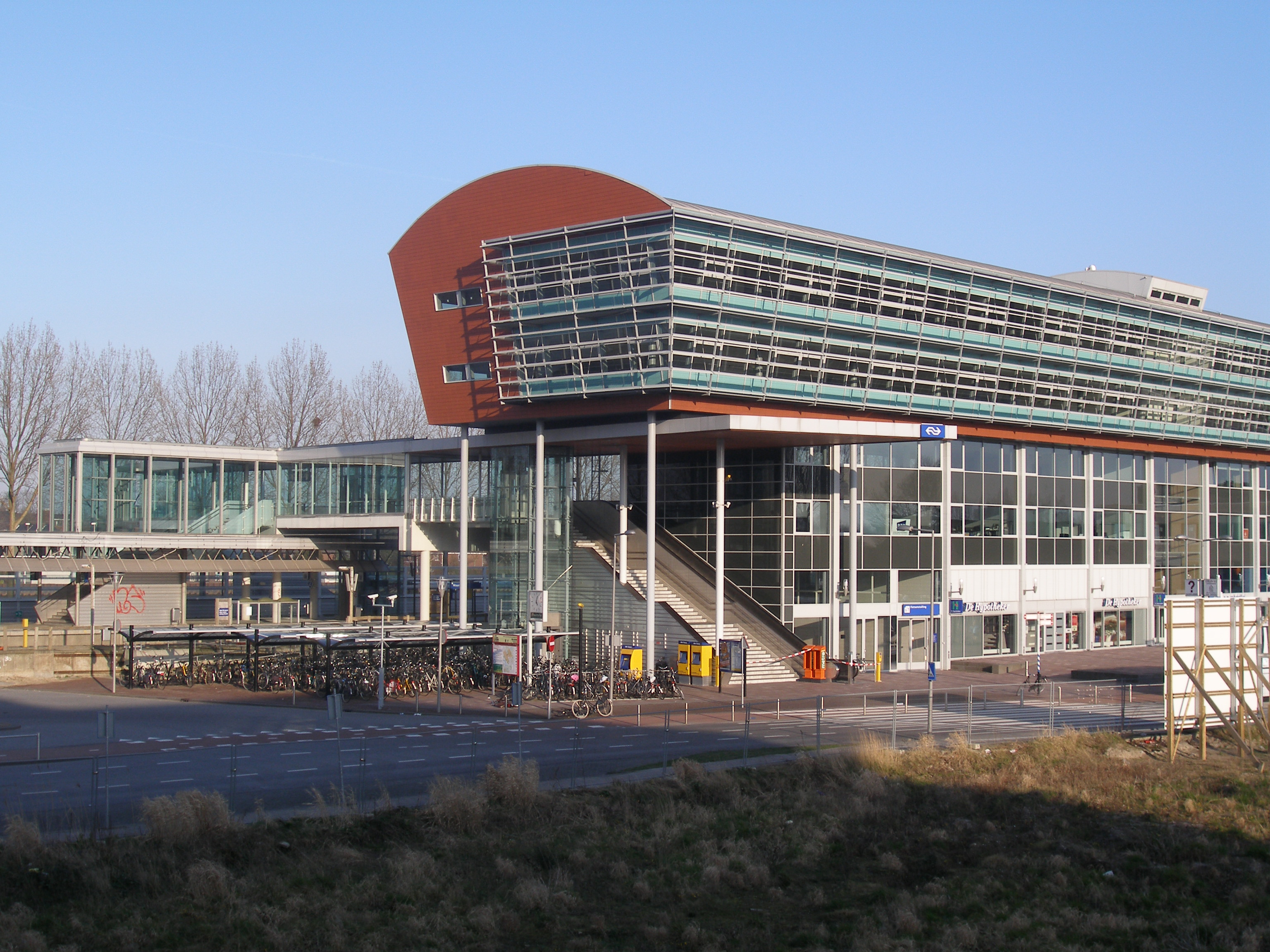
The 2004 Station Building
