= Utrecht Leidsche Rijn railway station =

Railway station in the Netherlands

Utrecht Leidsche Rijn
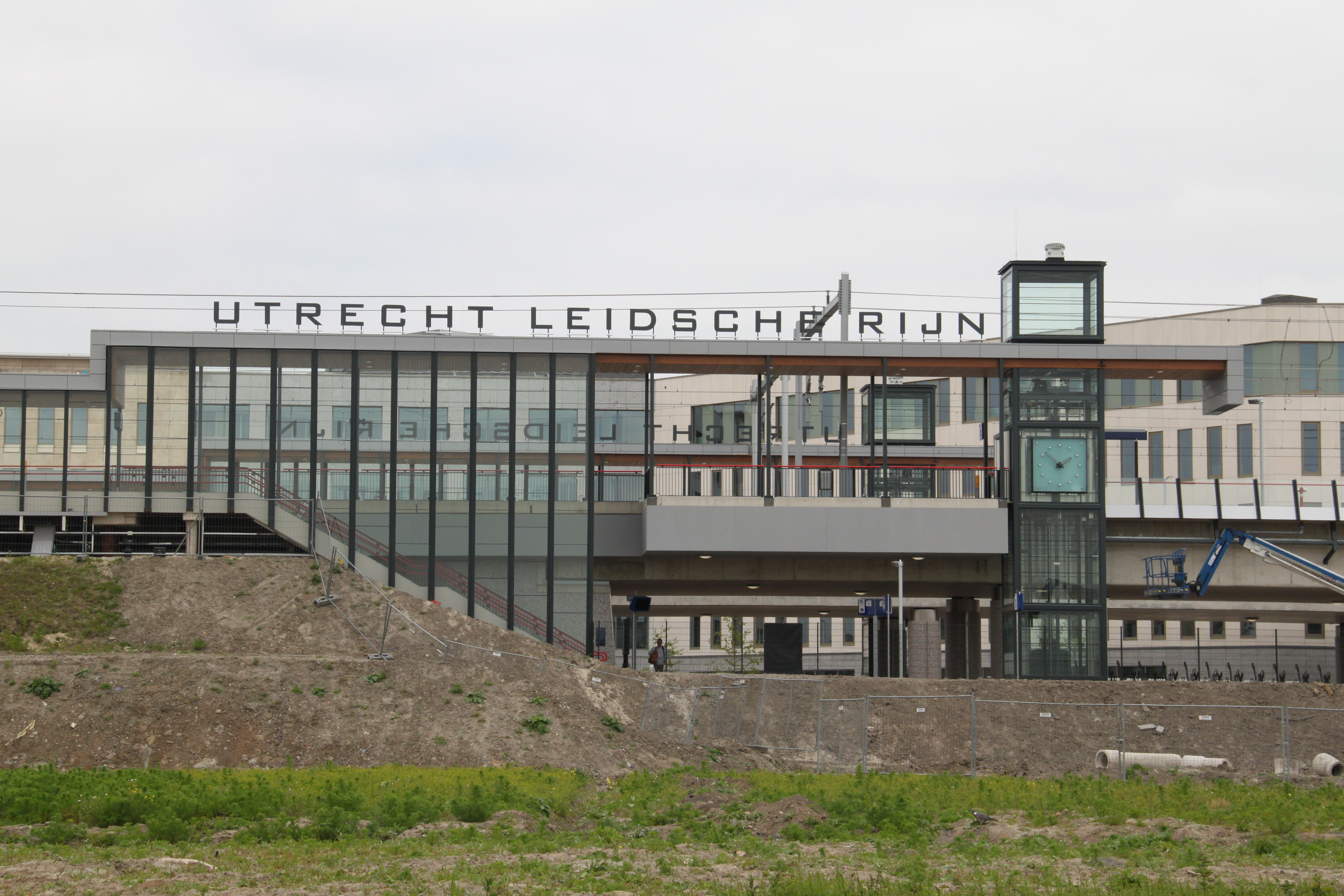
- Utrecht Leidsche Rijn station

General information
- Location: Netherlands
- Coordinates: 52°05′54″N 5°04′09″E
- Line: Utrecht–Rotterdam railway
- Platforms: 2

History
- Opened: 9 June 2013

Services
Preceding station	Nederlandse Spoorwegen	Following station
Utrecht Terwijde towards Den Haag Centraal	NS Sprinter 6000 After 18:00 and Fri-Sun	Utrecht Centraal towards 's-Hertogenbosch
Utrecht Terwijde towards Den Haag Centraal	NS Sprinter 6900 Mon-Thur until 18:00	Utrecht Centraal towards Tiel
Utrecht Terwijde towards Woerden	NS Sprinter 8900 Mon-Fri midday	Utrecht Centraal Terminus
Utrecht Terwijde towards Leiden Centraal	NS Sprinter 8900 Mon-Fri Peak	Utrecht Centraal Terminus
Location
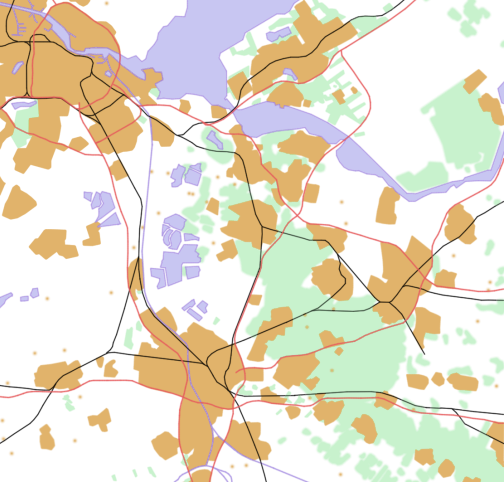
- Location within Northeastern Randstad

Utrecht Leidsche Rijn is a railway station in west Utrecht, Netherlands. The station opened on 9 June 2013 and is located on the Utrecht–Rotterdam railway. The station is primarily for the housing areas, Parkwijk and Terwijde Oost. Construction of the station started in the second half of 2009 and has four tracks with 2 platforms. The station is built across the A2 motorway.

== Train services ==
The following services call at the station:

- 2x per hour local service (sprinter) Woerden - Utrecht - Houten - Tiel
- 2x per hour local service (sprinter) Den Haag - Gouda - Woerden - Utrecht - Houten - Geldermalsen - Tiel
