= Utrecht Terwijde railway station =

Railway station in the Netherlands

Utrecht Terwijde
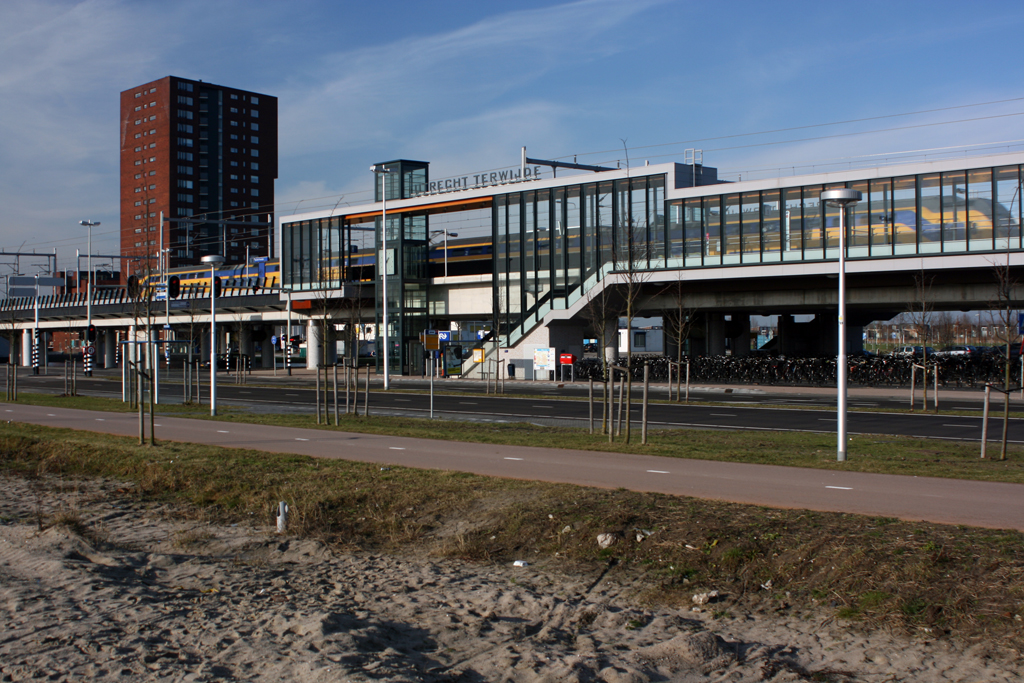
- Utrecht Terwijde railway station under construction

General information
- Location: Netherlands
- Coordinates: 52°6′3″N 5°2′35″E
- Line: Utrecht–Rotterdam railway
- Platforms: 2

Other information
- Station code: Utt

History
- Opened: 2003
- Closed: November 3, 2007 (reopened on November 5, 2007, new trainstation and a different location)

Services
| Preceding station | Nederlandse Spoorwegen | Following station |
|---|---|---|
| Vleuten towards Den Haag Centraal | NS Sprinter 6000 After 18:00 and Fri-Sun | Utrecht Leidsche Rijn towards 's-Hertogenbosch |
| Vleuten towards Den Haag Centraal | NS Sprinter 6900 Mon-Thur until 18:00 | Utrecht Leidsche Rijn towards Tiel |
| Vleuten towards Woerden | NS Sprinter 8900 Mon-Fri midday | Utrecht Leidsche Rijn towards Utrecht Centraal |
| Vleuten towards Leiden Centraal | NS Sprinter 8900 Mon-Fri Peak | Utrecht Leidsche Rijn towards Utrecht Centraal |
Location
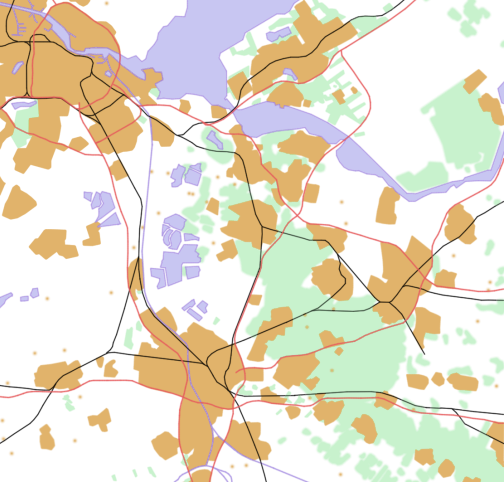
- Location within Northeastern Randstad

Utrecht Terwijde is a railway station on the Utrecht–Rotterdam railway. It is located between Vleuten and Utrecht Leidsche Rijn stations.

The Terwijde neighbourhood is part of the Leidsche Rijn area under construction, west of Utrecht. Because of the large number of Commuters in this area, a temporary railway station was built in 2003. And in 2005 construction started next to this station for the actual station, which opened on 5 November 2007.

Utrecht Terwijde railway station is part of a large project of expanding the two track line to four tracks on this stretch of the railway, which was completed in 2011.

== Train services ==
The following services call at Utrecht Terwijde:

- 2x per hour local service (sprinter) The Hague - Gouda - Utrecht
- 2x per hour local service (sprinter) Woerden - Utrecht

== Bus services ==
- 4 (Zuilen - Centraal Station - Leidsche Rijn - Utrecht Terwijde)
