= Moreelsebrug =

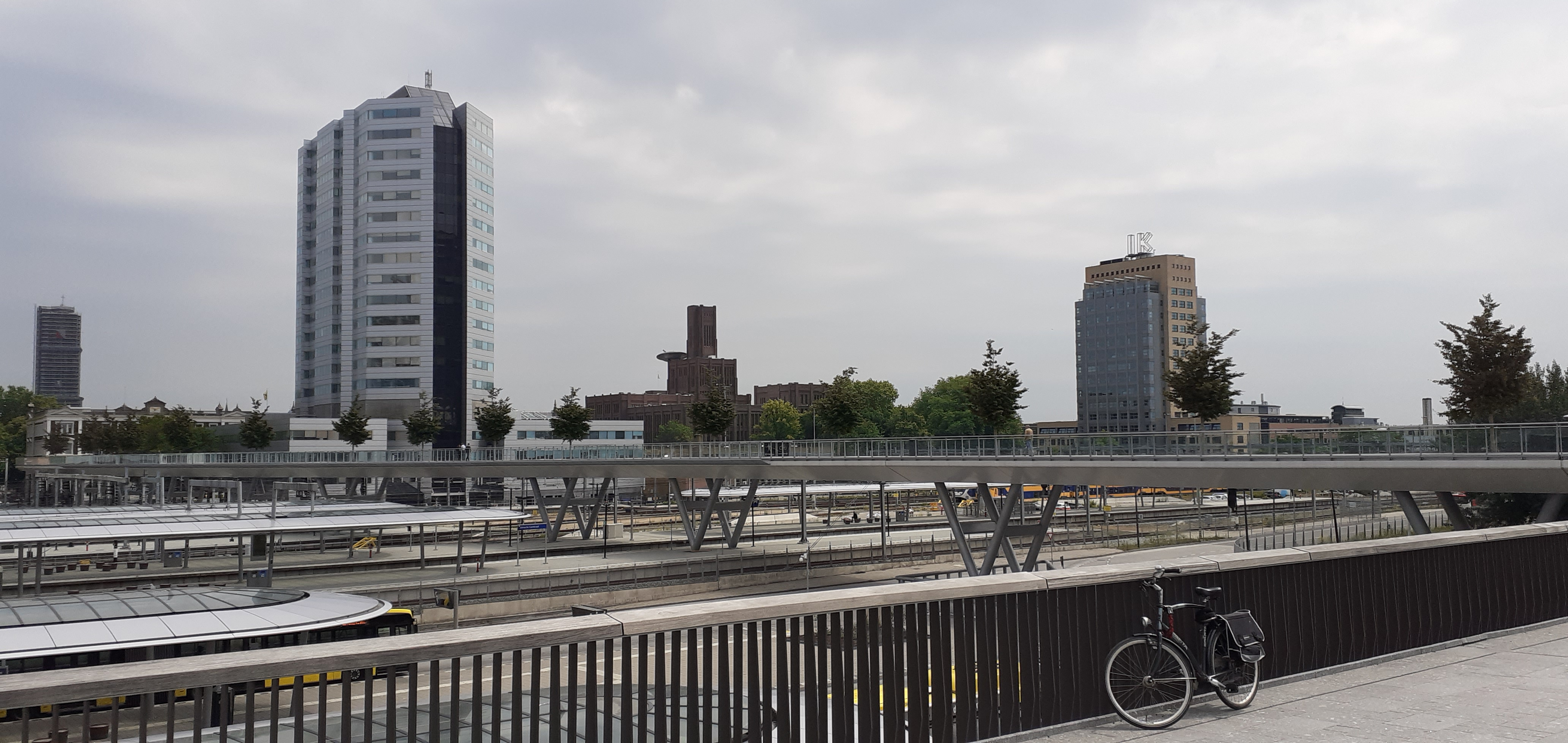
The Moreelsebrug

The Moreelsebrug (or Moreelse Bridge) is a bicycle and pedestrian bridge in Utrecht, Netherlands, spanning the railroad tracks to the south of Utrecht Centraal railway station. It is about 275 metres long and connects the Dichterswijk (Poet District) with Mariaplaats in the Binnenstad district. It was named for Hendrick Moreelse, a 17th-century mayor of Utrecht, after that choice received a plurality of the votes in a citywide referendum.

While it was under construction, the bridge was called the Rabobrug after Rabobank, because this bank made an 8.6 million euro contribution to the construction of the bridge. The remaining 3 million euros was paid by the municipality.

In March 2008 the town began with the choice of an architect. The bridge was expected to be finished in the first quarter of 2012. In the end, the start of the building was in March 2015 and is expected to be finished at the end of 2016. The stairs leading to the platforms will not be built straightaway, but ultimately in 2023.

Designed by Cepezed Architects, the bridge has been described as “an architectural statement, a beautiful structure with graceful lines that opens up a pleasant, treed boulevard in the middle of a busy city.”
