= Maarssenbroek =

- Town
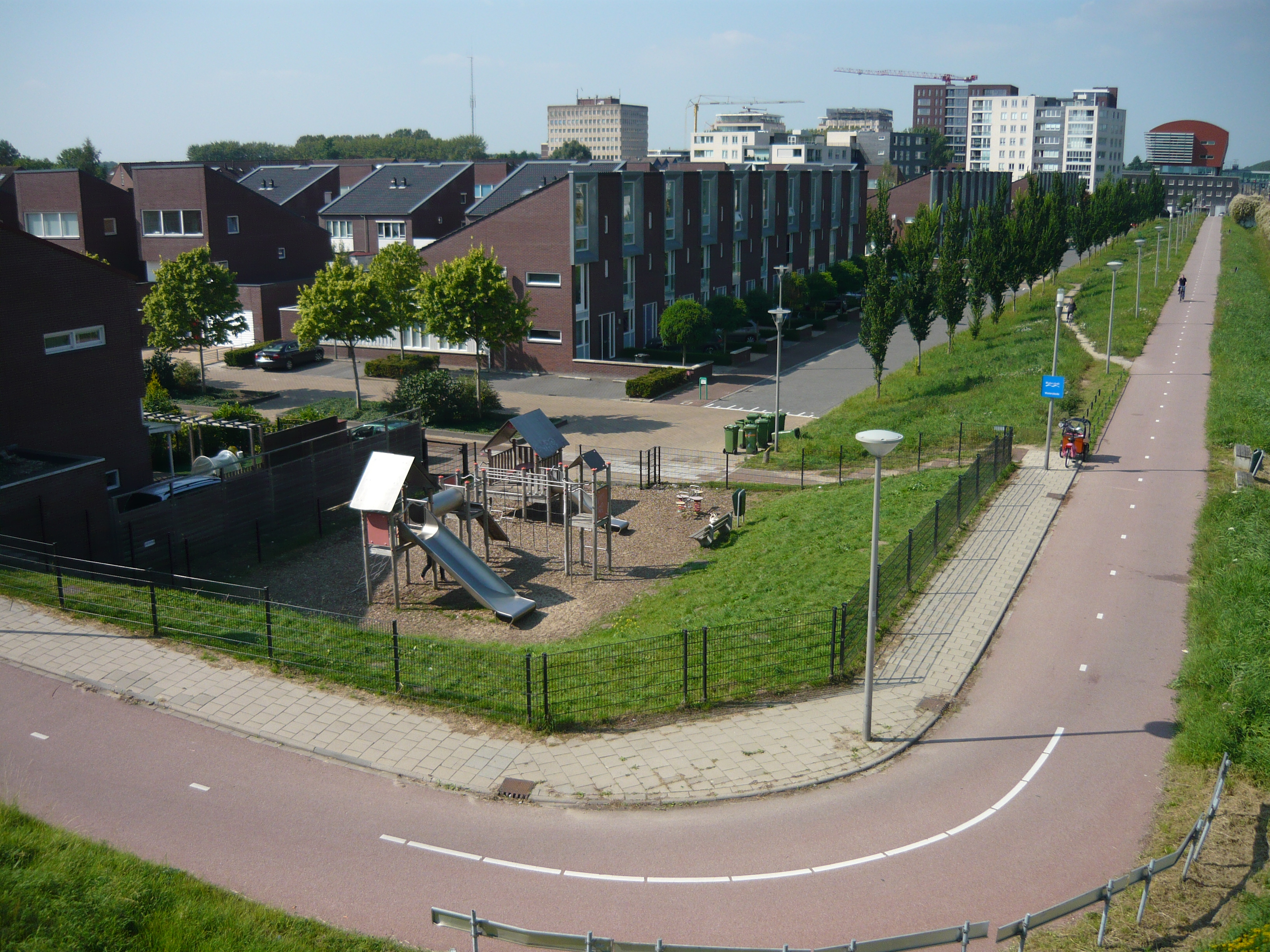
- View on Maarssenbroek

- Location in the Netherlands Maarssenbroek (Netherlands)
- Coordinates: 52°8′2″N 5°1′35″E
- Country: Netherlands
- Province: Utrecht
- Municipality: Stichtse Vecht

Area
  - Total: 4.99 km^{2} (1.93 sq mi)
- Elevation: −0.4 m (−1.3 ft)

Population (2021)
  - Total: 23,190
  - Density: 4,650/km^{2} (12,000/sq mi)
- Time zone: UTC+1 (CET)
  - Summer (DST): UTC+2 (CEST)
- Postal code: 3605-3608
- Dialing code: 0346

Maarssenbroek is a town in the Dutch province of Utrecht. It is nowadays part of the municipality of Stichtse Vecht. It lies on the west side of the Amsterdam-Rhine Canal.

Between 1815 and 1857, Maarssenbroek was a separate municipality.

Maarssenbroek is divided into thirteen residential areas with names picked from plant types and animal species as listed below. The various areas are ordered alphabetically on both sides of the main roads which are aptly named Floraweg (`Flora road`), Vogelweg (`Bird road`) and Safariweg (`Safari road`). starting from the south of the town. The entrances to the residential areas are marked on the main access roads by blue signs on which a silhouette of the animal responsible for the area's name has been stenciled in white.

The streets in the residential areas of Maarssenbroek don't have names themselves; the addresses are composed by appending the house number to the area name. Within the residential areas the location of the addresses are indicated with green signs in white lettering pointing out the street where a specific house number can be found (e.g. a sign "501-599" pointing to the right).

== Transportation ==
- Maarssen railway station

== Gallery ==
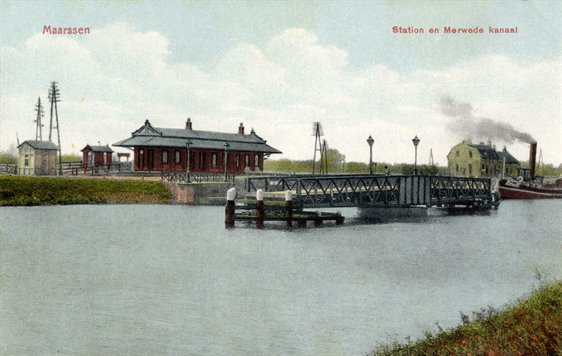
Former turning bridge around 1912

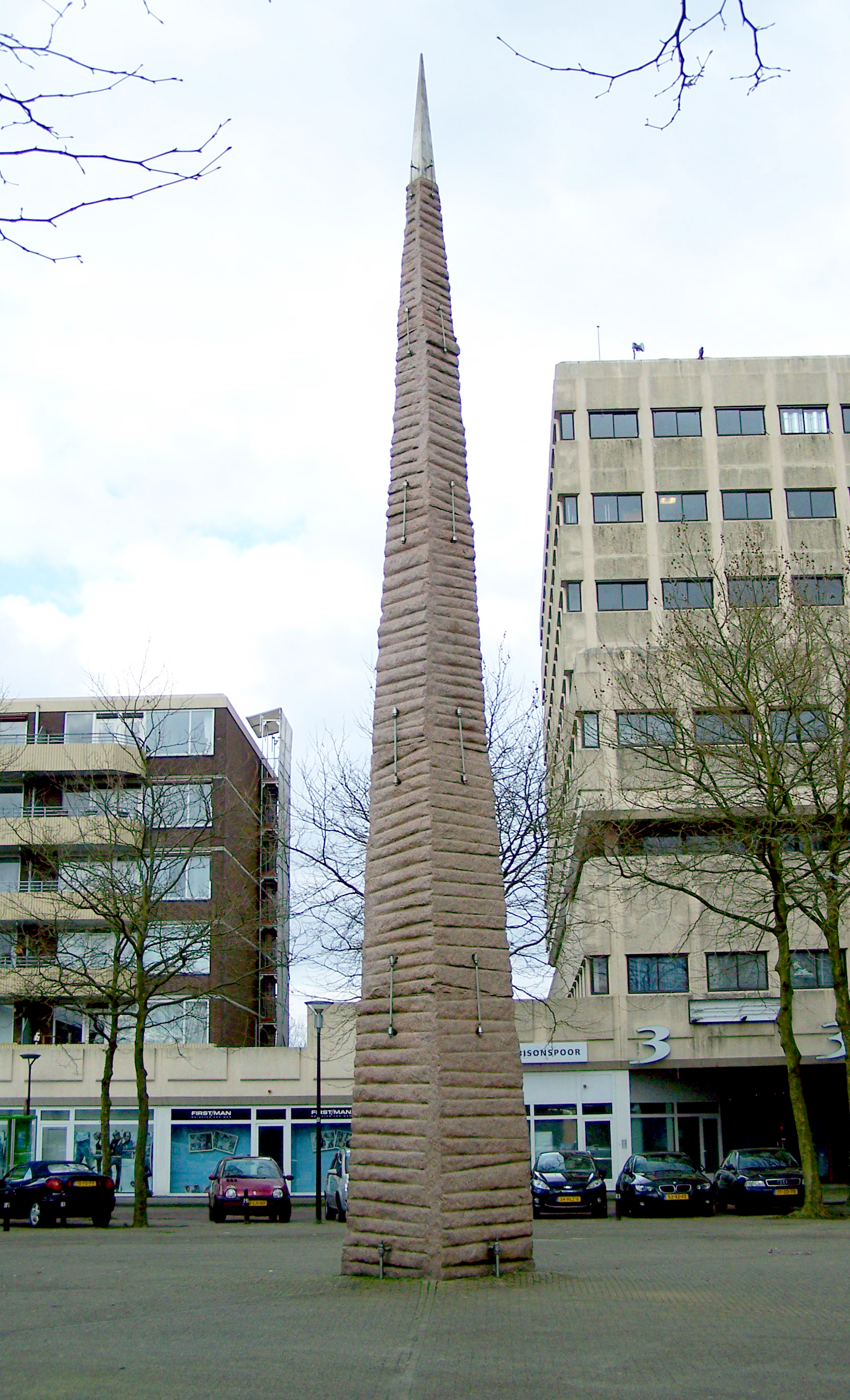
Former obelisk in Bisonspoor

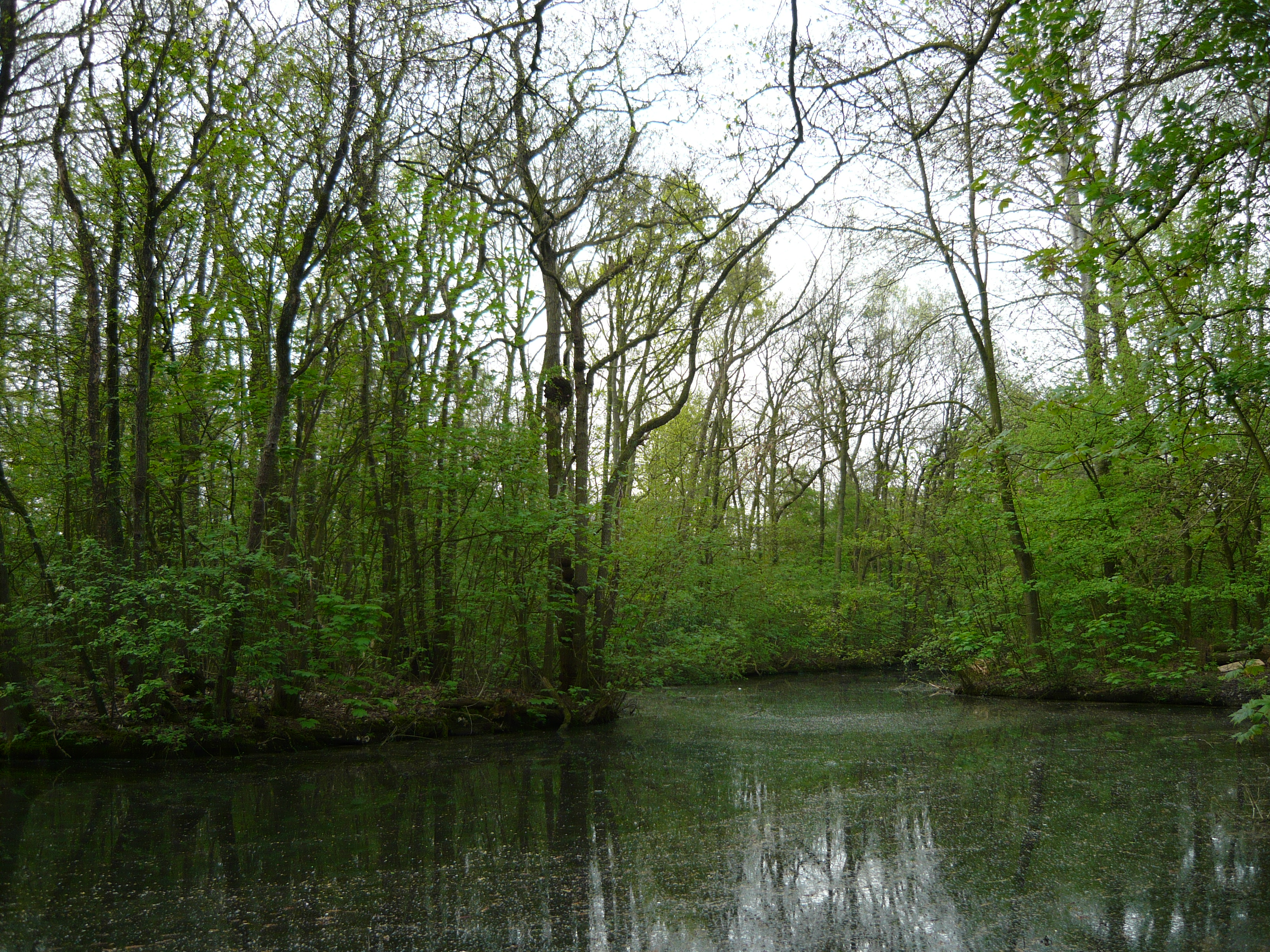
Nature park in Maarssenbroek

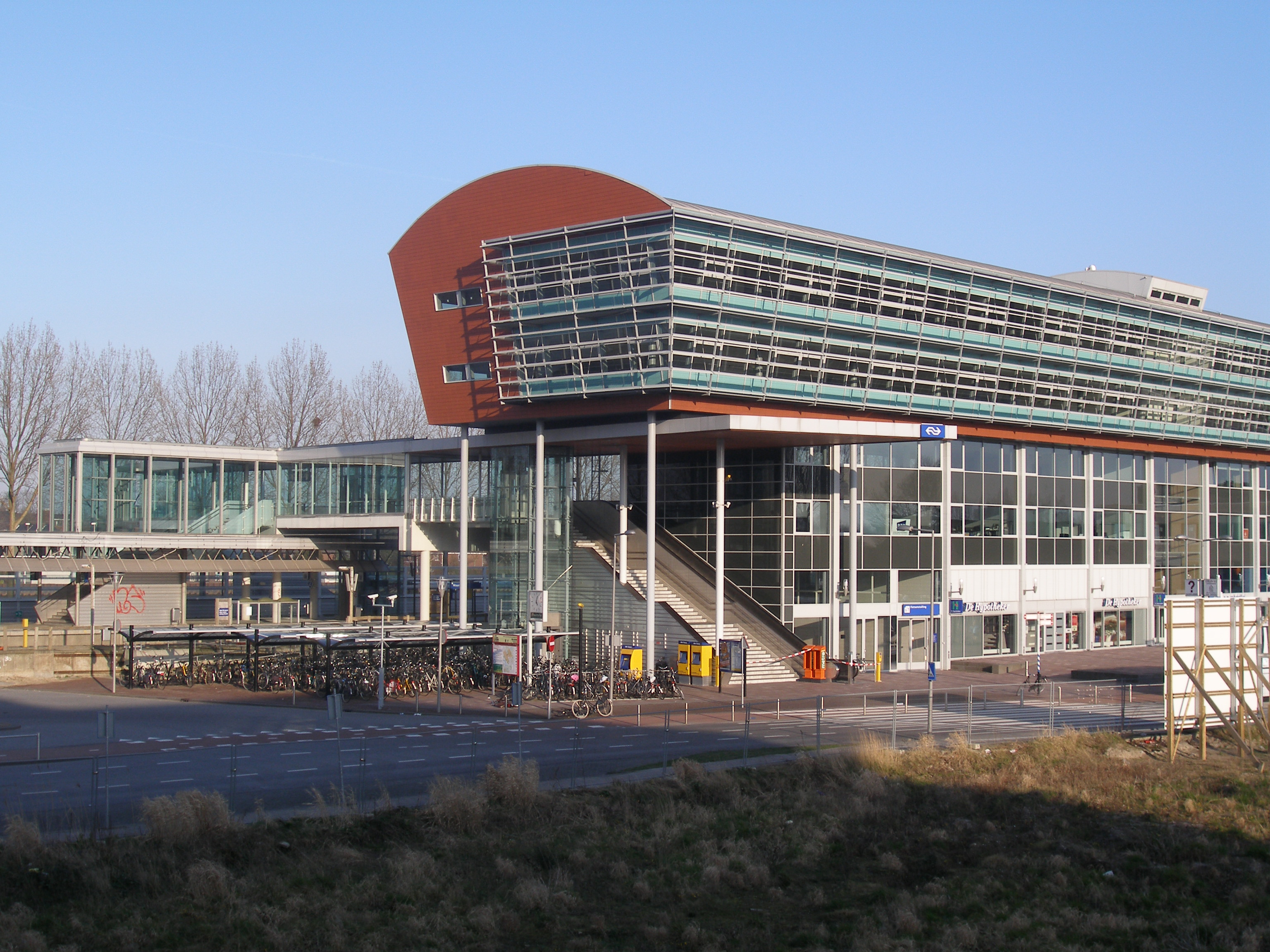
Railway station
