= Utrecht Zuilen railway station =

Railway station in the Netherlands

Utrecht Zuilen
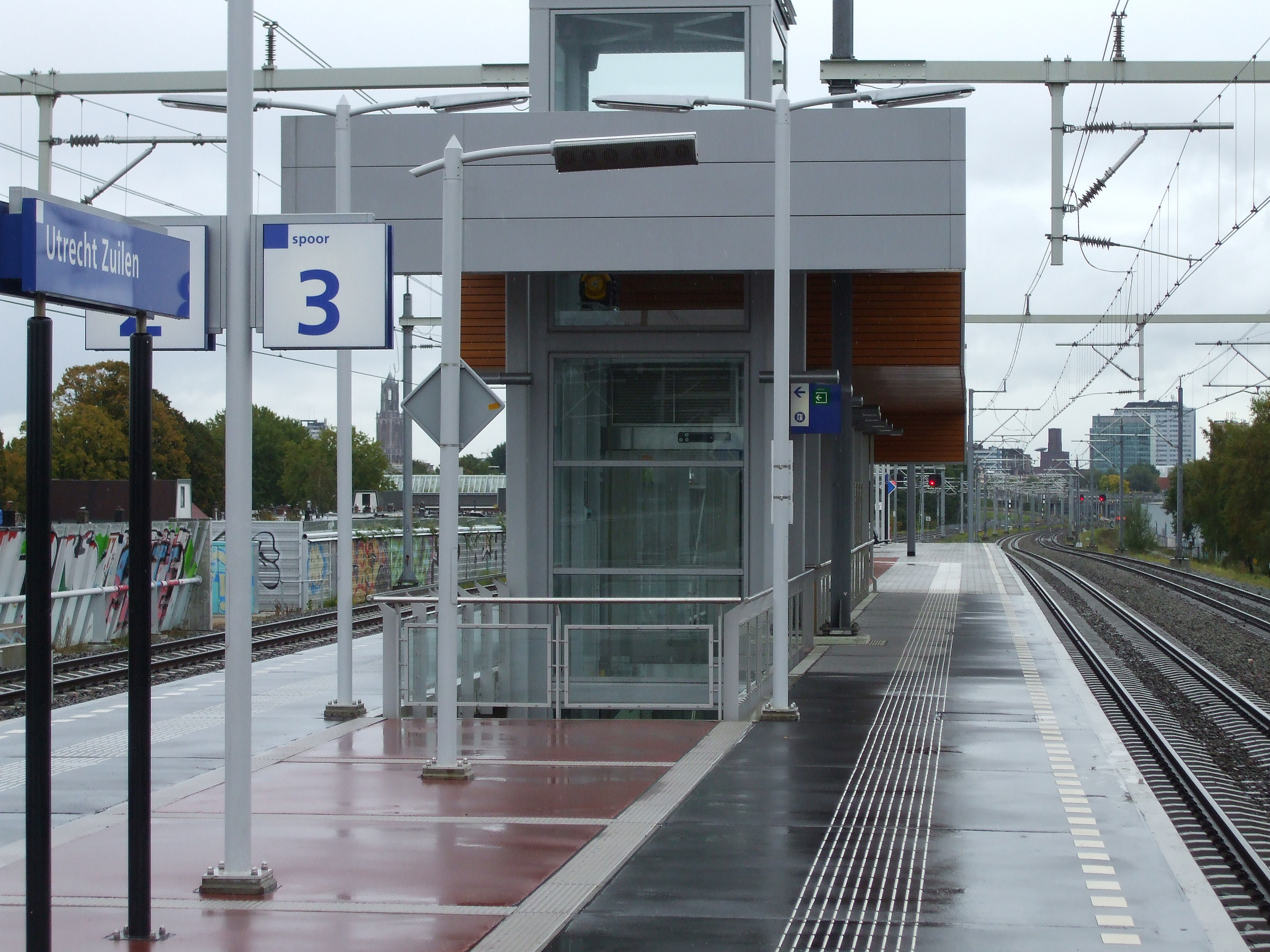
- Platform 2-3

General information
- Location: Netherlands
- Coordinates: 52°06′11″N 5°05′21″E
- Line: Amsterdam–Arnhem railway

Services
Preceding station	Nederlandse Spoorwegen	Following station
Maarssen towards Breukelen	NS Sprinter 7300	Utrecht Centraal towards Rhenen
Maarssen towards Uitgeest	NS Sprinter 7400 Peak hours only	Utrecht Centraal towards Driebergen-Zeist
Location
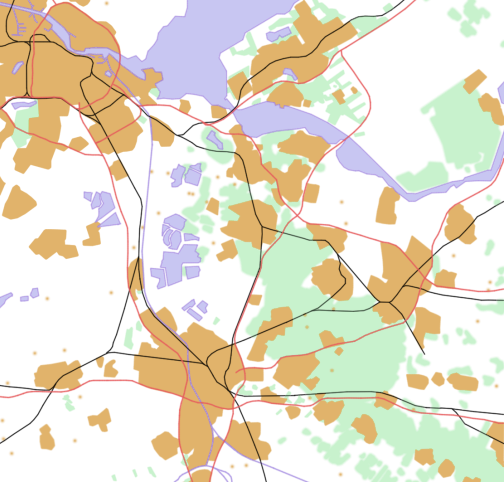
- Location within Northeastern Randstad

Utrecht Zuilen is a railway station located in Utrecht, Netherlands. The station opened on 10 June 2007 and is located on the Amsterdam–Arnhem railway. The services are currently operated by Nederlandse Spoorwegen.

== Train services ==
The following services currently call at Utrecht Zuilen:

- 2x per hour local service (sprinter) Amsterdam - Utrecht - Rhenen
- 2x per hour local service (sprinter) Breukelen - Utrecht - Veenendaal Centrum

== Bus services ==
- 10 - Lunetten - Transwijk - Oog in Al - Zuilen - Overvecht - Wittevrouwen - Rijnsweerd - De Uithof WKZ
