= Nieuwerkerk aan den IJssel railway station =

Railway station in the Netherlands

Nieuwerkerk aan den IJssel
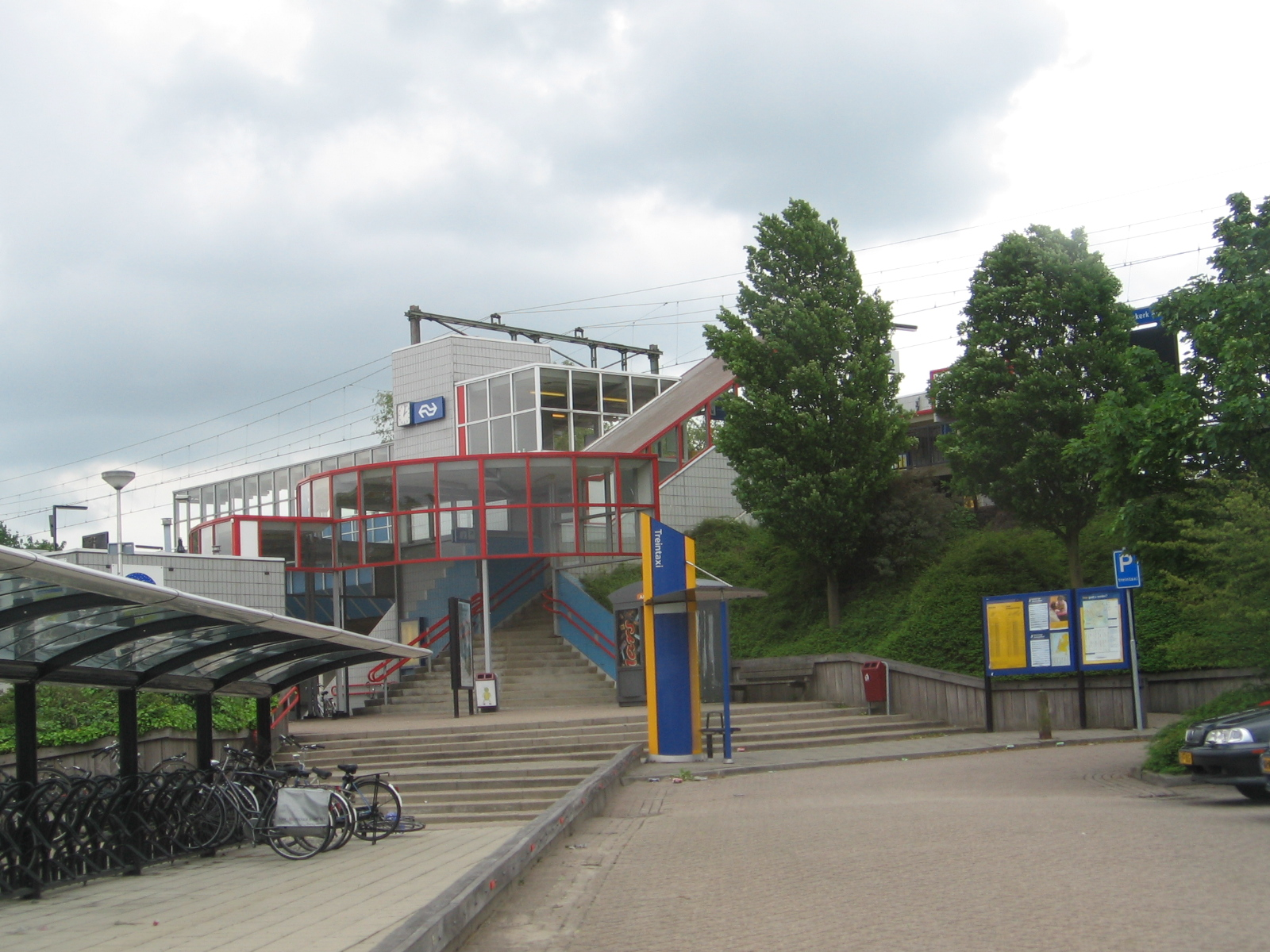

General information
- Location: Netherlands
- Coordinates: 51°57′55″N 4°37′1″E
- Line: Utrecht–Rotterdam railway
- Platforms: 2

Other information
- Station code: Nwk

History
- Opened: 1971

Services
Preceding station	Nederlandse Spoorwegen	Following station
Capelle Schollevaar towards Rotterdam Centraal	NS Sprinter 4000	Gouda towards Uitgeest
Location
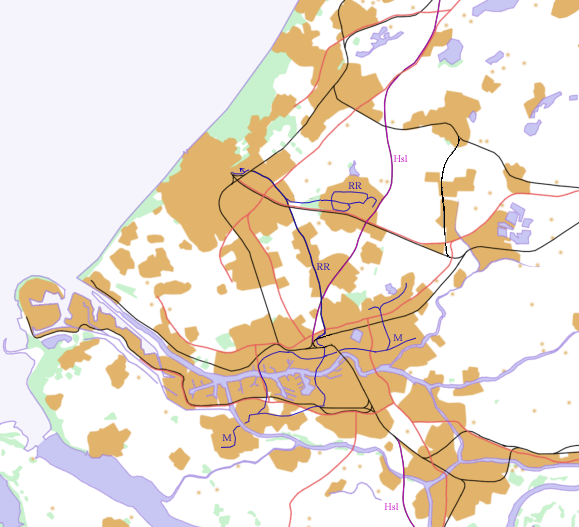
- Location within Southwest Randstad Location within Netherlands

Nieuwerkerk aan den IJssel is a railway station in Nieuwerkerk aan den IJssel, Netherlands. The station is located on the Utrecht–Rotterdam railway between Gouda and Rotterdam Centraal. It was opened on 21 May 1971 and is mostly used by commuters. The train services are operated by Nederlandse Spoorwegen.

== Train services ==
The following services call at Nieuwerkerk a/d IJssel:

- 2x per hour local service (sprinter) Uitgeest - Amsterdam - Woerden - Gouda - Rotterdam
- 2x per hour local service (sprinter) Rotterdam - Gouda Goverwelle
