= Breukelen railway station =

Railway station in the Netherlands

Breukelen
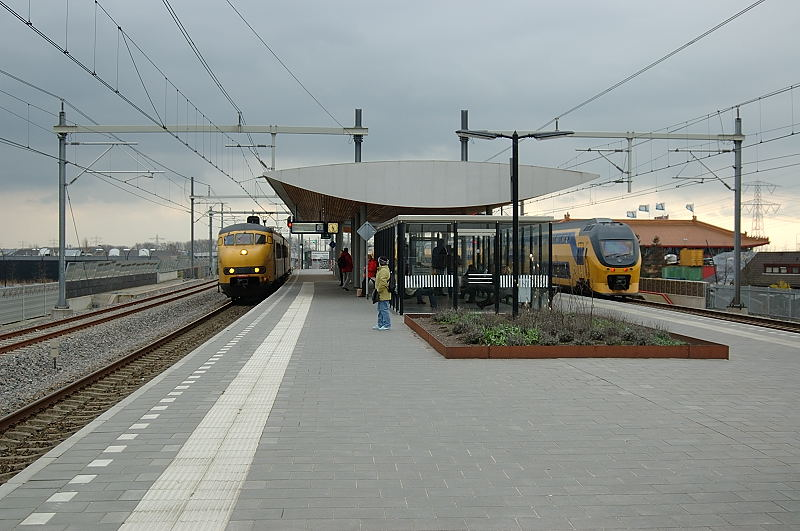

General information
- Location: Netherlands
- Coordinates: 52°10′12″N 4°59′26″E
- Lines: Amsterdam–Arnhem railway Harmelen–Breukelen railway

History
- Opened: 18 December 1843, 2002 (current form)

Services
Preceding station	Nederlandse Spoorwegen	Following station
Abcoude towards Uitgeest	NS Sprinter 4000	Woerden towards Rotterdam Centraal
Terminus	NS Sprinter 7300	Maarssen towards Rhenen
Abcoude towards Uitgeest	NS Sprinter 7400 Peak hours only	Maarssen towards Driebergen-Zeist
Location
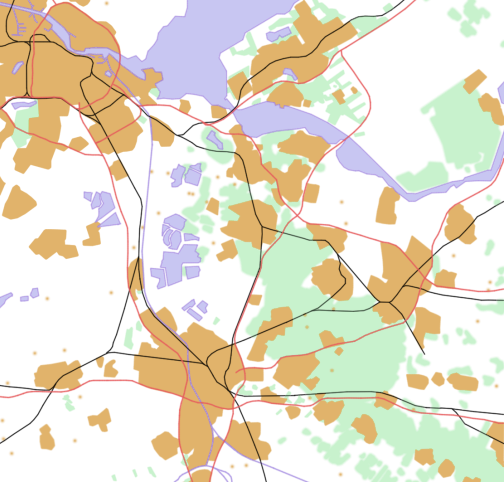
- Location within Northeastern Randstad

Breukelen is a railway station located in Breukelen, Netherlands. The station was opened on 18 December 1843 and is on the Amsterdam–Arnhem railway. It is also the northern end of the Harmelen–Breukelen railway. A new station was opened in 2002 nearer the A2 motorway and further from the town. For this the junction with the line to Harmelen and Woerden also moved.

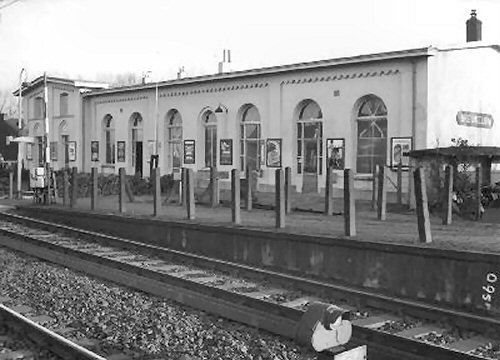
Breukelen railway station in 1967

== Train services ==
The following services currently call at Breukelen:

- 2x per hour local service (sprinter) Uitgeest - Amsterdam - Woerden - Rotterdam
- 2x per hour local service (sprinter) (Amsterdam -) Breukelen - Utrecht - Rhenen (Amsterdam only during peak hours)
- 2x per hour local service (sprinter) Breukelen - Utrecht - Veenendaal Centrum
