= Utrecht Centraal station =

Railway station in the Netherlands

Utrecht Centraal
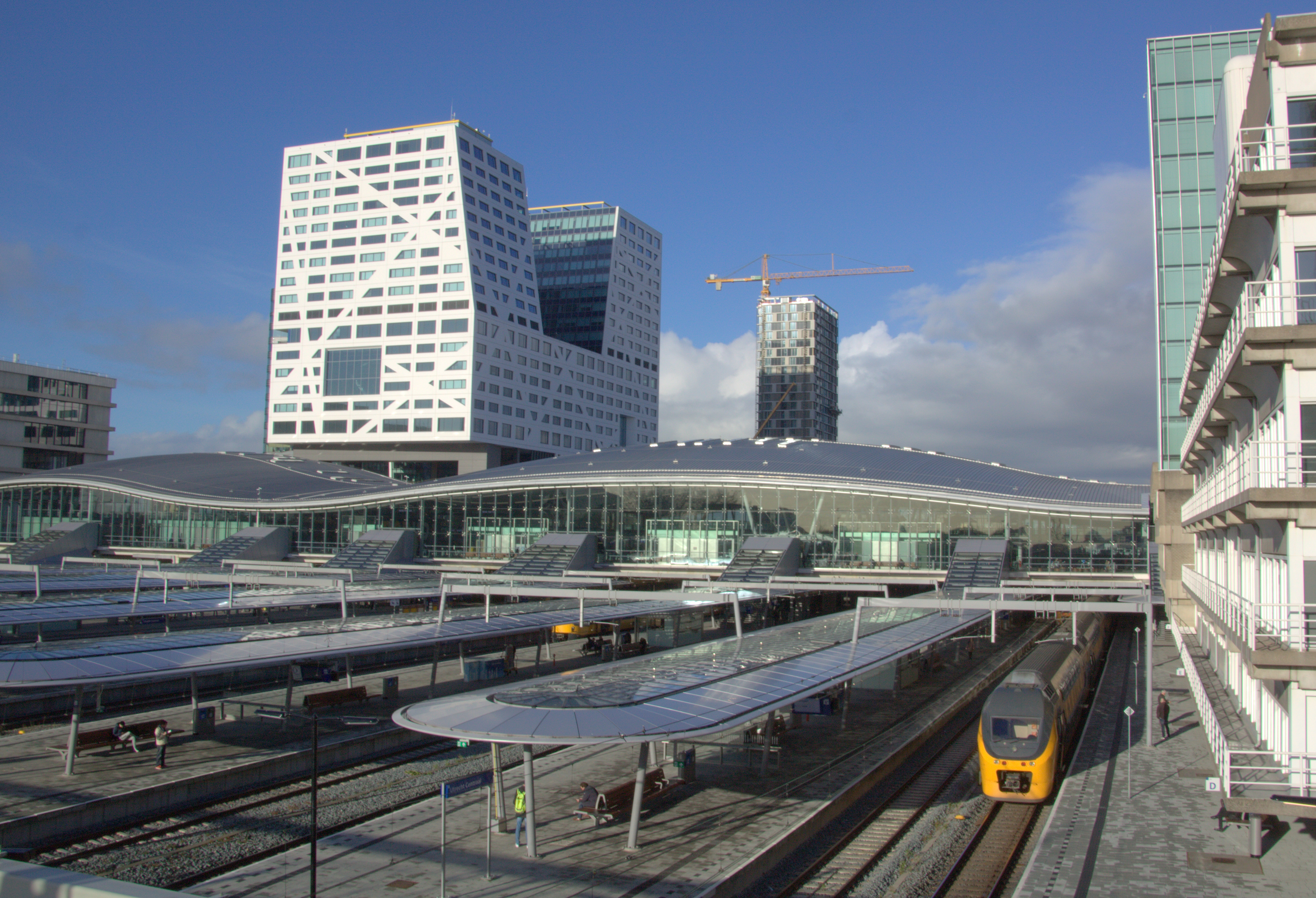
- Utrecht Centraal in 2018

General information
- Location: Utrecht; Netherlands
- Coordinates: 52°5′21″N 5°6′35″E
- Owner: ProRail
- Operator: Nederlandse Spoorwegen; NS International; Arriva; ÖBB (Nightjet)
- Lines: Amsterdam–Arnhem railway Utrecht–Rotterdam railway Utrecht–Boxtel railway Utrecht–Kampen railway
- Platforms: 8
- Tracks: 16
- Connections: U-OV, Qbuzz Tram: 20, 21, 22; U-OV, Qbuzz: 1, 2, 3, 4, 5, 6, 7, 8, 12, 24, 28, 38, 41, 47, 50, 55, 65, 73, 74, 77, 85, 285; Provincie Utrecht, Syntus: 50, 102, 107, 120, 195/295; Drechtsteden, Qbuzz: 90, 387, 388; Bravo, Arriva: 400, 401; Arriva: 195/295; Flixbus: 056, 086, 800, 817, 833, N31, N800, K947

Construction
- Platform levels: 2
- Parking: N/A
- Cycle facilities: 29232 (not including OV-Fiets (Rental))
- Accessible: Lifts, escalators and 24/7 staff to aid with boarding.
- Architect: Benthem Crouwel

Other information
- Station code: Ut
- Fare zone: 5000
- Website: https://www.ns.nl/stationsinformatie/ut/utrecht-centraal

History
- Opened: 18 December 1843; 182 years ago

Passengers
- 241.730 daily railway passengers (excluding transfers, 2025 statistics)

Services
Preceding station	DB Fernverkehr	Following station
Amsterdam Centraal Terminus	ICE 78	Arnhem Centraal towards Frankfurt (Main) Hbf or München Hbf
Preceding station	ÖBB	Following station
Amsterdam Centraal Terminus	Nightjet	Eindhoven Centraal towards Zürich HB
Preceding station	Nederlandse Spoorwegen	Following station
Gouda towards Den Haag Centraal	NS Intercity 500	Reverses direction
Amersfoort Centraal towards Groningen	NS Intercity 500	Reverses direction
Gouda towards Den Haag Centraal	NS Intercity 600	Reverses direction
Amersfoort Centraal towards Leeuwarden	NS Intercity 600	Reverses direction
Amsterdam Bijlmer ArenA towards Rotterdam Centraal	NS Nachtnet 1400 Tuesday only	Terminus
Amsterdam Centraal towards Rotterdam Centraal	NS Nachtnet 1400 Except on Tues, Wed	Terminus
Gouda towards Den Haag Centraal	NS Intercity 1700 Until 20:00	Reverses direction
Amersfoort Centraal towards Enschede	NS Intercity 1700	Reverses direction
Gouda towards Rotterdam Centraal	NS Intercity 2000 Until 20:30	Terminus
Amsterdam Amstel towards Alkmaar	NS Intercity 2700 Mon-Thur until 19:00	's-Hertogenbosch towards Maastricht
Gouda towards Rotterdam Centraal	NS Intercity 2800	Terminus
Amsterdam Bijlmer ArenA towards Enkhuizen	NS Intercity 2900 After 19:00 and Fri-Sun only	's-Hertogenbosch towards Maastricht
Amsterdam Amstel towards Den Helder	NS Intercity 3000	Driebergen-Zeist towards Nijmegen
Amsterdam Bijlmer ArenA towards Den Haag Centraal	NS Intercity 3100 Mon-Thu before 19:00	Ede-Wageningen towards Nijmegen
Amsterdam Bijlmer ArenA towards Den Haag Centraal	NS Intercity 3100 Fri-Sun before 19:00	Veenendaal-De Klomp towards Nijmegen
Amsterdam Bijlmer ArenA towards Rotterdam Centraal	NS Intercity 3200 Mon-Thu before 19:00	Veenendaal-De Klomp towards Arnhem Centraal
Amsterdam Bijlmer ArenA towards Dordrecht	NS Intercity 3500	's-Hertogenbosch towards Venlo
Amsterdam Amstel towards Enkhuizen	NS Intercity 3900 Mon-Thur until 19:30	's-Hertogenbosch towards Heerlen
Amsterdam Centraal towards Rotterdam Centraal	NS Nachtnet 11400 Wednesday Night only	Terminus
Terminus	NS Nachtnet 21400 Fri/Sat nights only	's-Hertogenbosch towards Eindhoven Centraal
Terminus	NS Nachtnet 21430 Fri/Sat night only	Driebergen-Zeist towards Nijmegen
Amersfoort Centraal Terminus	NS Nachtnet 21440 Fri/Sat night only	Terminus
Utrecht Overvecht towards Almere Centrum	NS Sprinter 4900	Terminus
Utrecht Overvecht towards Baarn	NS Sprinter 5500	Terminus
Utrecht Overvecht towards Zwolle	NS Sprinter 5600	Terminus
Utrecht Overvecht towards Leiden Centraal	NS Sprinter 5700 Not after 20:30	Terminus
Utrecht Leidsche Rijn towards Den Haag Centraal	NS Sprinter 6000 After 18:00 and Fri-Sun	Utrecht Vaartsche Rijn towards 's-Hertogenbosch
Woerden towards Leiden Centraal	NS Sprinter 6700 After 18:00 and Fri-Sun	Utrecht Vaartsche Rijn towards Tiel
Utrecht Leidsche Rijn towards Den Haag Centraal	NS Sprinter 6900 Mon-Thur until 18:00	Utrecht Vaartsche Rijn towards Tiel
Utrecht Zuilen towards Breukelen	NS Sprinter 7300	Utrecht Vaartsche Rijn towards Rhenen
Utrecht Zuilen towards Uitgeest	NS Sprinter 7400 Peak hours only	Utrecht Vaartsche Rijn towards Driebergen-Zeist
Woerden towards Leiden Centraal	NS Sprinter 8800 Mon-Thur until 18:00	Utrecht Vaartsche Rijn towards 's-Hertogenbosch
Utrecht Leidsche Rijn towards Woerden	NS Sprinter 8900 Mon-Fri midday	Terminus
Utrecht Leidsche Rijn towards Leiden Centraal	NS Sprinter 8900 Mon-Fri Peak	Terminus
Terminus	NS Sprinter 28300	Utrecht Maliebaan Terminus
Preceding station	Arriva Netherlands	Following station
Amsterdam Bijlmer ArenA towards Schiphol Airport	Nachttrein 32710 Friday night only	's-Hertogenbosch towards Maastricht
Location
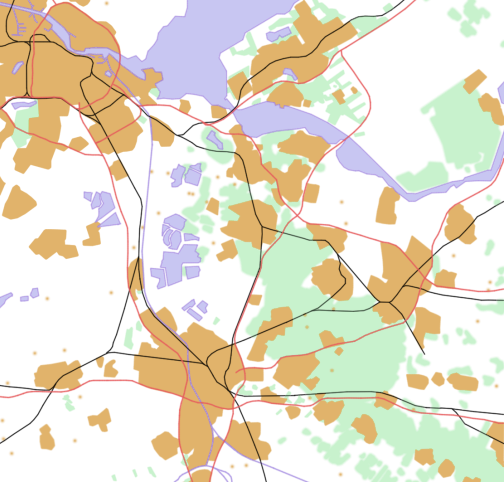
- Location within Northeastern Randstad

Utrecht Centraal, officially Station Utrecht Centraal (Dutch: [staːˈɕɔn ˈytrɛxt sɛnˈtraːl]), is the transit hub that integrates three bicycle parkings, two bus stations, two tram stops and the central railway station for Utrecht, Netherlands. It is the biggest train station in the Netherlands.

Both the railway station and the bus station are the largest and busiest in the Netherlands. The bicycle parking station on the east side is the largest in the world.

The railway station has sixteen platform tracks (of which twelve are through tracks) and 207,360 embarking and disembarking passengers per day, excluding transfers. Because of its central location in the Netherlands, Utrecht Centraal is the most important railway hub of the country with more than 1,000 departures per day.

== History ==
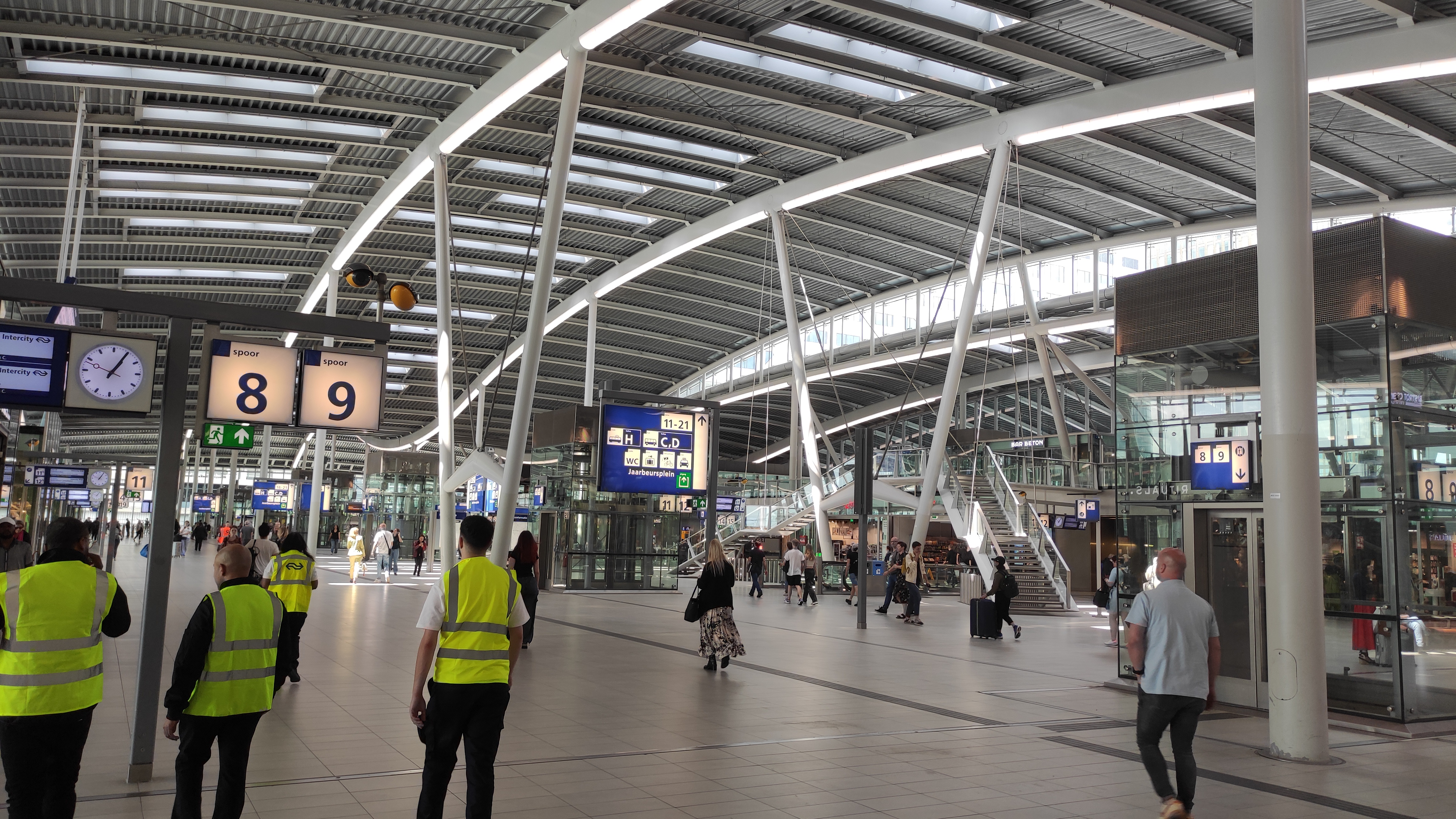
Inside the station hall

The first railway station at the site was opened on 18 December 1843, when the Nederlandsche Rhijnspoorweg-Maatschappij opened the first station on Utrecht territory.

In 1938, the station became the central station as the Maliebaanstation, on the other side of the city, was closed and the line from Hilversum was diverted into the central station. The station building of 1865 remained in place, though a fundamental renovation was done in 1936. Two years later, a fire burned down most of the building, which was subsequently rebuilt.

The station building was demolished in the 1970s to make way for Hoog Catharijne, then Europe's largest enclosed shopping mall, which opened on 17 December 1973. From that moment onwards, the station no longer had a real entrance; the passageways of the shopping mall just continued into the station. In 1989 the station hall was enlarged (tripling the original size) to increase capacity and to solve bottlenecks. In 1995, the station hall was again enlarged, with the construction of a new platform.

Between 2011 and 2016, the station underwent a major reconstruction as one of the NSP projects of the Dutch government and as part of a general reconstruction of the Utrecht station area. The station hall was replaced by a new, much larger hall, housing all modes of public transport. The new structure with its curved roof, was designed by Benthem Crouwel Architekten. The roof has three curves: a large one in the middle for the railway station and two smaller ones for the bus/tram stations on either side. New sheltering roofs were built for all platforms and the station was separated from the Hoog Catharijne shopping area.

A scale model of Utrecht Centraal is on display at Madurodam.

=== Tram and bus facilities ===
Light-rail (sneltram) service at Utrecht Centraal began in 1983 with the opening of the SUNIJ line (sneltram Utrecht-Nieuwegein/IJsselstein). Its tram stop (named Utrecht Centraal) was originally located on the east side of the station. In 2009, when the nearby Moreelsepark tram terminal was closed, the Centraal stop was adapted to be the new terminal for the shortened SUNIJ line. At this time, the Centraal stop was given a minor makeover including provision for the OV-chipkaart and travel information displays.

In 2013, to accommodate construction work at the railway station, the SUNIJ line was further shortened. The Centraal stop on the east side of the station was closed and replaced by a stop at Jaarbeursplein on the west side of the railway station, becoming the temporary terminal of the SUNIJ line. The temporary Jaarbeursplein terminal had 3 tracks.

In July 2016, the bus terminal on the east side of the station was also relocated to the west side ('Jaarbeurszijde'). This move made space available on the east side of the station for the construction of a new Centrumzijde (downtown side) bus and tram terminal as well as the construction of a new tram line (Uithoflijn), a new station square (Stationsplein), a bicycle storage facility and the Moreelse bridge.

On 9 December 2019, the Centrumzijde bus and tram terminal opened at Utrecht Centraal. It is located under the main hall on the east side of the railway station, and riders can access it directly from the main hall. On 16 December 2019, the Uithof line (Uithoflijn, tram route 22) started operation running from Centrumzijde to P+R Science Centre in the Uithof district. Passengers who wanted to transfer between the SUNIJ and Uithof lines had to walk 500 metres (1,600 ft) between the Jaarbeursplein and Centrumzide stops. There was a track between the two stops, but it was used only for Uithof trams returning to the depot without passengers. The platform heights for the SUNIJ and Uithof lines were incompatible.

On 4 July 2020, the SUNIJ line was shut down for renovation including rebuilding the Jaarbeursplein stop. The stop was converted from a terminal for high-floor trams to a through-station for longer, low-floor trams. The old platforms were demolished, and the stub siding was eliminated. New side platforms were built along the through-tracks. Electrical overhead wires and track switches were also replaced. On 3 January 2021, the Jaarbeursplein tram stop reopened with low-level platforms.

On 2 July 2022, through-passenger service started between the Jaarbeursplein and Centrumzijde stops, thus eliminating the 500-metre walking transfer between the two stops at Utrecht Centraal. Trams would travel via the station between Nieuwegein and IJsselstein on the SUNIJ line and the Uithof district on the Uithof line (Uithoflijn).

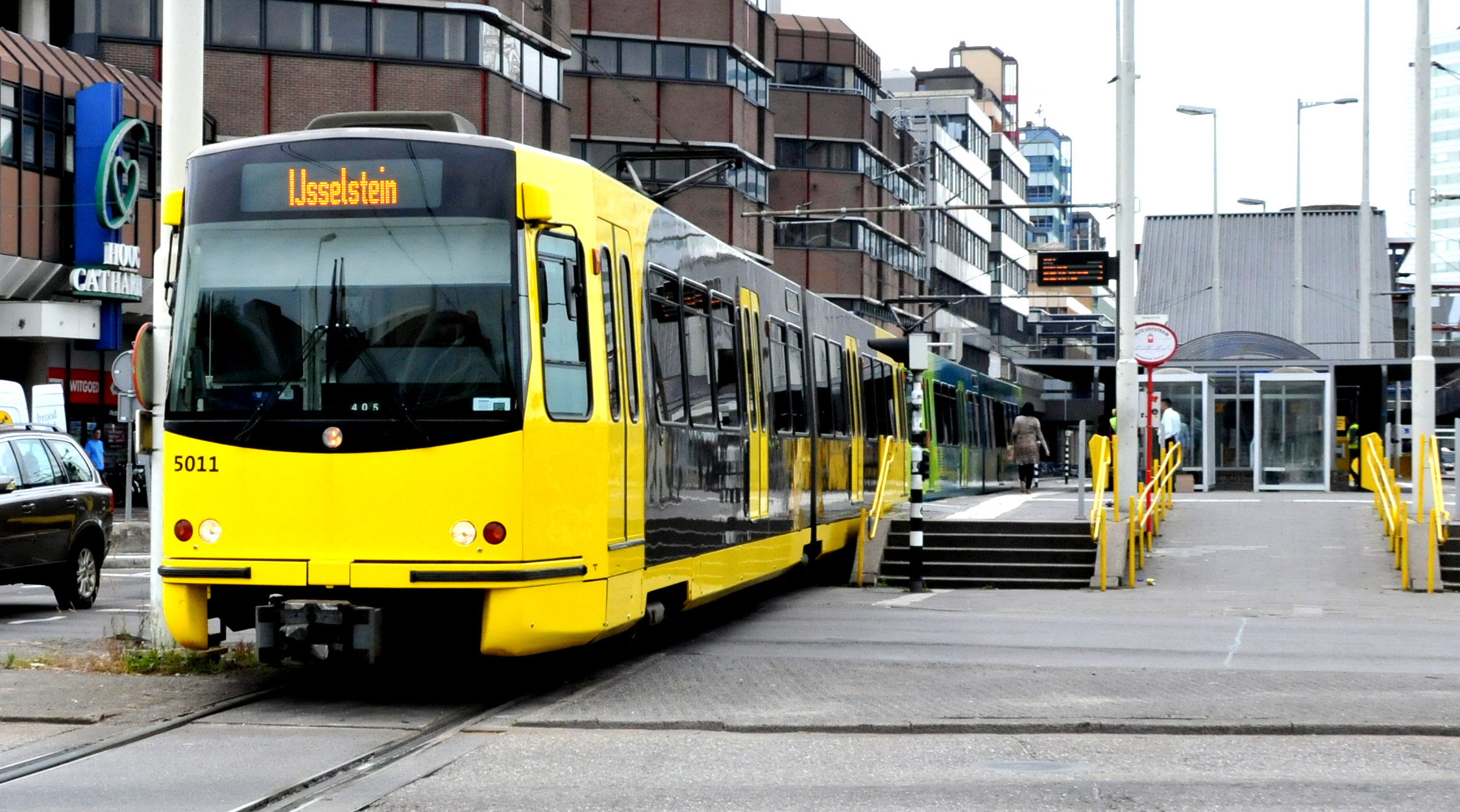
Centraal: Former tram stop on east side of station (closed 2013)

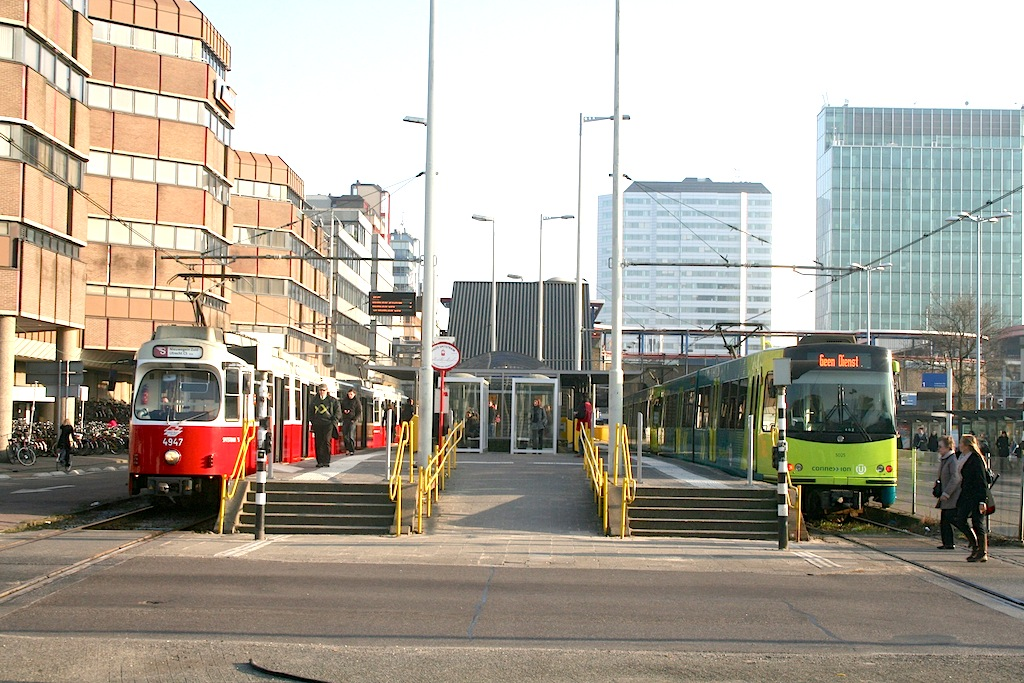
Centraal: Former tram stop on east side of station (closed 2013)

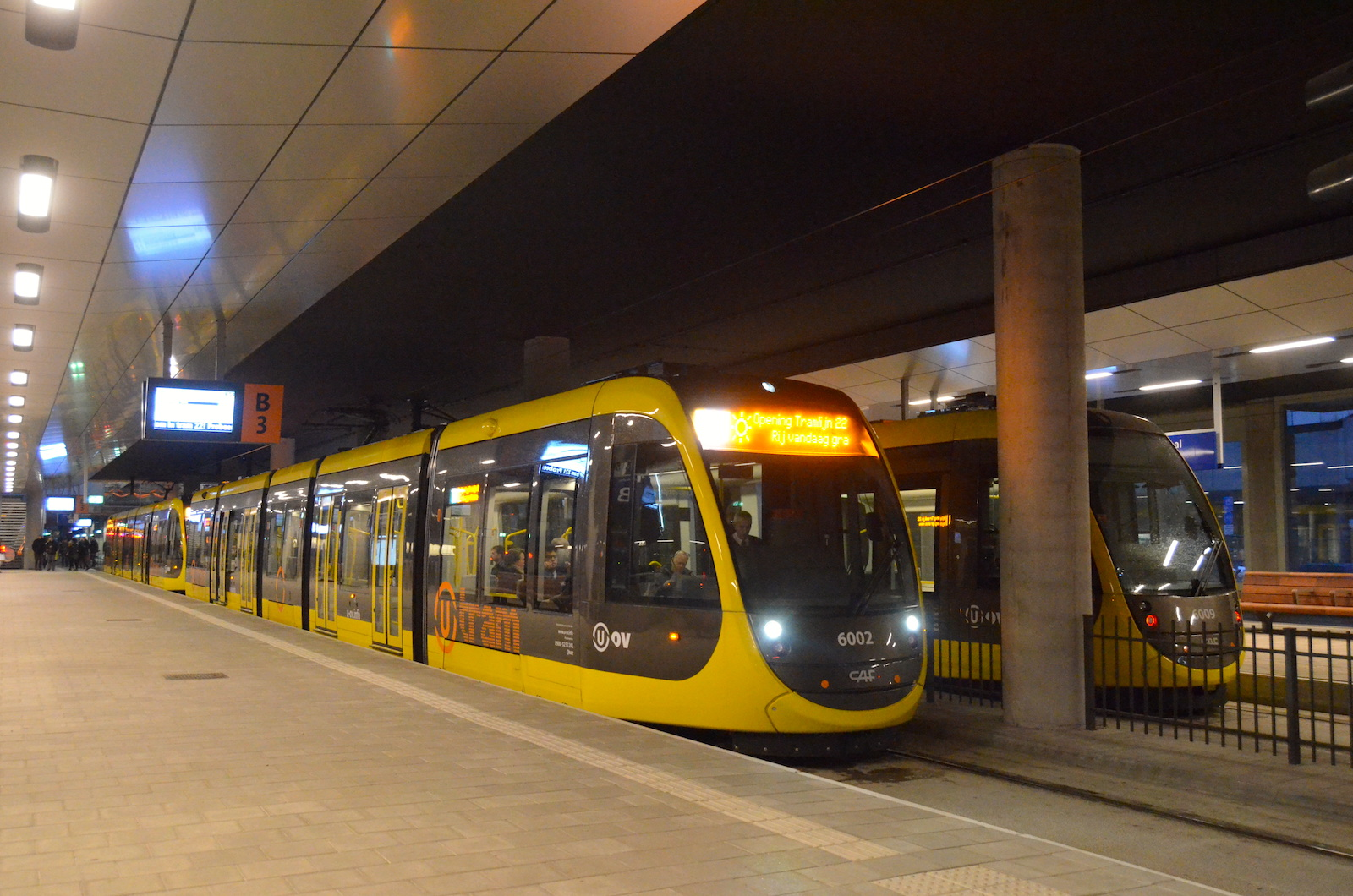
Centrumzijde: Underground tram stop on east side of station (opened 2019)

== Train services ==
International, national and local train services call at the station, most notably the Intercity-Express and NightJet trains to Germany, Switzerland and Austria, domestic Intercity services to all parts of the Netherlands, and local (Sprinter) services providing access to towns all over Utrecht province. Freight services also pass through the station, on the Amsterdam – Betuweroute – Ruhr corridor as well as the Antwerp – Northeast Germany corridor.

The following passenger services call at Utrecht Centraal (2024 timetable):

=== International services ===
Series	Operators	Route
100 ICE 43	Intercity-Express (NS International)	Amsterdam Centraal – Utrecht Centraal – Arnhem Centraal – Oberhausen Hbf – Duisburg Hbf – Düsseldorf Hbf ] / [ Hannover Hbf – Minden (Westf) – Herford – Bielefeld Hbf – Gütersloh Hbf – Hamm (Westf) – Hagen Hbf – Wuppertal Hbf ] – Köln Hbf – Siegburg/Bonn – Frankfurt (Main) Flughafen Fernbahnhof – Mannheim Hbf – Karlsruhe Hbf – Offenburg – Freiburg (Breisgau) Hbf – Basel Bad Bf – Basel SBB
120/220 ICE 78	Intercity-Express (NS International)	Amsterdam Centraal – Utrecht Centraal – Arnhem Centraal – Oberhausen Hbf – Duisburg Hbf – Düsseldorf Hbf – Köln Hbf – Frankfurt (Main) Flughafen Fernbahnhof – Frankfurt (Main) Hbf
NJ 400	ÖBB Nightjet (ÖBB)	Amsterdam Centraal – Utrecht Centraal – Arnhem Centraal – Innsbruck Hbf / Wien Hbf / Zürich HB

=== National services ===
Series	Operators	Route
500	Intercity (NS)	Rotterdam Centraal – Utrecht Centraal – Amersfoort Centraal – Zwolle – Assen – Groningen
600	Intercity (NS)	Leeuwarden – Meppel – Zwolle – Amersfoort Centraal – Utrecht Centraal – Rotterdam Centraal
800	Intercity (NS)	Maastricht – Sittard – Roermond – Weert – Eindhoven Centraal – 's-Hertogenbosch – Utrecht Centraal – Amsterdam Centraal – Alkmaar – (Den Helder)
1400	Intercity (NS)	Utrecht Centraal – Amsterdam Centraal – Schiphol Airport – Den Haag HS – Rotterdam Centraal
1700	Intercity (NS)	Den Haag Centraal – Gouda – Utrecht Centraal – Amersfoort Centraal – Apeldoorn – Deventer – Almelo – Hengelo – Enschede
11700	Intercity (NS)	Amersfoort Schothorst – Amersfoort Centraal – Utrecht Centraal – Gouda – Den Haag Centraal
2000	Intercity (NS)	Den Haag Centraal – Gouda – Utrecht Centraal
2800	Intercity (NS)	Den Haag Centraal – Gouda – Utrecht Centraal
2900	Intercity (NS)	Enkhuizen – Hoorn – Amsterdam Centraal – Utrecht Centraal – 's-Hertogenbosch – Eindhoven Centraal – Weert – Roermond – Sittard – Maastricht
3000	Intercity (NS)	Nijmegen – Arnhem Centraal – Ede-Wageningen – Veenendaal-De Klomp – Driebergen-Zeist – Utrecht Centraal – Amsterdam Centraal – Zaandam – Alkmaar – Den Helder
3100	Intercity (NS)	Schiphol Airport – Utrecht Centraal – Veenendaal-De Klomp – Ede-Wageningen – Arnhem Centraal – Nijmegen
3200	Intercity (NS)	Arnhem Centraal – Ede-Wageningen – Utrecht Centraal – Amsterdam Zuid – Schiphol Airport – Leiden Centraal – Den Haag HS – Delft – Schiedam Centrum – Rotterdam Centraal
3500	Intercity (NS)	Schiphol Airport – Utrecht Centraal – 's-Hertogenbosch – Eindhoven Centraal – Helmond – Venlo
3700	Intercity (NS)	Dordrecht – Rotterdam Centraal – Schiedam Centrum – Delft – Den Haag HS – Leiden Centraal – Schiphol Airport – Amsterdam Zuid – Utrecht Centraal – 's-Hertogenbosch – Eindhoven Centraal – Helmond – Venlo
3900	Intercity (NS)	Enkhuizen – Hoorn – Amsterdam Centraal – Utrecht Centraal – 's-Hertogenbosch – Eindhoven Centraal – Weert – Roermond – Sittard – Heerlen
4900	Intercity (NS)	Utrecht Centraal – Hilversum – Almere Centrum
14900	Sprinter (NS)	Almere Centrum – Hilversum – Utrecht Centraal
5500	Sprinter (NS)	Utrecht Centraal – Den Dolder – Baarn
5600	Sprinter (NS)	Utrecht Centraal – Amersfoort Centraal – Zwolle
5700	Sprinter (NS)	Utrecht Centraal – Hilversum – Weesp – Amsterdam Zuid – Schiphol Airport – Hoofddorp
6000	Sprinter (NS)	Utrecht Centraal – Geldermalsen – 's-Hertogenbosch
6700	Sprinter (NS)	Utrecht Centraal – Geldermalsen – Tiel
6900	Sprinter (NS)	Den Haag Centraal – Gouda – Utrecht Centraal
7300	Sprinter (NS)	Breukelen – Utrecht Centraal – Driebergen-Zeist – Veenendaal Centrum – Rhenen
7400	Sprinter (NS)	Uitgeest – Zaandam – Amsterdam Centraal – Breukelen – Utrecht Centraal – Driebergen-Zeist
8800	Sprinter (NS)	Leiden Centraal – Alphen a/d Rijn – Woerden – Utrecht Centraal
8900	Sprinter (NS)	(Leiden Centraal – Alphen a/d Rijn – )Woerden – Utrecht Centraal
14000	Sprinter (NS)	Utrecht Centraal – Gouda – Rotterdam Centraal
21400	Intercity (NS)	Rotterdam Centraal – Eindhoven Centraal; Tilburg – 's-Hertogenbosch; Eindhoven Centraal – Utrecht Centraal
22400	Intercity (NS)	Utrecht Centraal – Amersfoort Centraal
23400	Intercity (NS)	Utrecht Centraal – Driebergen-Zeist – Veenendaal-De Klomp – Ede-Wageningen – Arnhem Centraal – Elst – Nijmegen
28300	Sprinter (NS)	Utrecht Centraal – Utrecht Maliebaan
32700	Nachttrein (Arriva)	Maastricht – Sittard – Roermond – Weert – Eindhoven Centraal – 's-Hertogenbosch – Utrecht Centraal – Amsterdam Bijlmer ArenA – Amsterdam Zuid – Schiphol Airport

=== Timetable ===
The train services are scheduled in such a way, that there is a basic frequency of an Intercity and a Sprinter every 15 minutes in every direction from Utrecht Centraal. The Intercity trains on the routes Amsterdam – Utrecht, Schiphol – Utrecht, Utrecht – Arnhem and Utrecht – Eindhoven run every 10 minutes.

Some services run only during the peak hour, but on most lines the basic frequency is offered all day. On Sunday mornings and late evenings some services do not run, but even during those times, there is always an Intercity and a Sprinter at least every 30 minutes in every direction.

== Redesign of the track layout ==
As the central hub of the Dutch railway network, disruptions at Utrecht Centraal can easily affect the rest of the country's railway network. 2–3 times per year, such disruptions led to a snowball effect, resulting in a total standstill of railway traffic in a wide area around Utrecht Centraal.

As part of a general effort to improve the reliability of the Dutch railway network and because of the High-Frequency programme (PHS) of the Dutch government, it was decided to remodel the track layout of the station, an investment of €270 million.

=== Reasons for the redesign ===
The Ministry of Infrastructure described the reasons for the project as follows:

==== The problem of the old layout ====
- Insufficient capacity for the desired intensities of passenger and freight trains. This concerns railway infrastructure capacity as well as transfer capacity.
- Insufficient quality of the railway service. The punctuality of the passenger service in Utrecht is structurally lower than in the rest of the country.
- Insufficient robustness of the infrastructure. The layout is complex, vulnerable to failure and expensive due to the large number of switches and crossing movements.

==== The main measures ====
- Limited extension of the infrastructure as far as possible within the available space: one extra platform with two tracks. Other platforms were modified based on the larger passenger numbers.
- Better use and optimisation of the existing infrastructure: separating train traffic flows from each other, with a fixed platform allocation per corridor, less switches, higher speeds and shorter headways.

==== The goals ====
- Increased capacity, allowing more trains and more transfers.
- Shorter travel times. The speed for freight and passenger trains is increased from 40 km/h to 80 km/h.
- Higher reliability
  - Less failures due to a reduction in switches, less crossing movements and a simplified traffic control.
  - In case a disruption does happen, its effect will be limited to one corridor.
  - More buffers to deal with the consequences of disruptions within the corridor.

=== The design: learning from Japan ===
The idea for the new track layout was based on the layout of Shinagawa station in Tokyo. Based on Shinagawa and other Japanese examples, a new design philosophy for track layout was developed within ProRail.
It contains the following hierarchy:

1. The main traffic flows are physically separated from each other (as far as possible within the given space) and have their own dedicated tracks.
2. The layout of these tracks is optimized for speed and headways, this is the main function of the stations.
3. Additional switches are added for reaching the depots. In the case of Utrecht, there are three depots and each platform track has access to at least one depot.
4. As a last step, switches are added where necessary to enable traffic management in case of disruptions.

These switches have to fulfill a number of conditions:

  - The switches for disruption management cannot compromise the main function.
  - Switches are only added for a fixed number of disruption scenarios (alternative platform track, complete or partial blockage of a line).
  - For each switch, a cost benefit analysis is made (including financial and operational aspects, such as delay minutes). Only switches with a positive result are included in the final design.

=== The result ===
The new layout has around 60 switches (compared to around 200 for the old layout) and results in a doubling of capacity.

This capacity growth is due to the separating of the flows, the shorter headways and the extra platform. A part of this capacity growth is used for the implementation of the PHS High Frequency Programme, in which the basic frequency of several corridors is increased from 4 to 6 trains per hour. The station has capacity for a basic frequency of 8 trains per hour on all corridors, which makes it future proof for the foreseen growth up to 2040.

== Bus services ==
Utrecht Centraal has two bus stations. One on the east side of the railway station (Busstation Centrumzijde) and the other on the west side (Busstation Jaarbeurszijde). The majority of the bus services in and around the city is operated by Qbuzz under the U-OV brand. Syntus Utrecht (Keolis) and Arriva operate some of the regional bus services.

=== Busstation Centrumzijde ===
- 2 Centraal Station – City Centre – Museumkwartier – Centraal Station (circular, one direction)
- 3 Centraal Station – Overvecht – Zuilen – Centraal Station (circular, both directions)
- 16 Leidsche Rijn – Lombok – Centraal Station – Vredenburg
- 18 De Meern Oost > Langerak > Centraal Station > Rijnsweerd (peak hour only)
- 28 Vleuten – Vleuterweide – De Meern – Centraal Station – Wittevrouwen – Rijnsweerd – Science Park (U-Link)

=== Busstation Jaarbeurszijde ===
- 1 Hoograven – Rivierenwijk – Centraal Station – Overvecht Noord
- 4 Voordorp – Tuindorp – Centraal Station – Langerak – Terwijde
- 5 Centraal Station – Oog in Al – Terwijde – Maarssen
- 6 Galgenwaard – Sterrenwijk – Centraal Station – Overvecht Zuid
- 7 Zuilen – Ondiep – Centraal Station – Kanaleneiland Zuid
- 8 Lunetten – Tolsteeg – Centraal Station – Wilhelminapark
- 12 Centraal Station – Zuilen – Maarssen
- 18 Rijnsweerd > Centraal Station > Langerak > De Meern Oost (peak hour only)
- 24 Centraal Station – Papendorp – Oudenrijn (peak hour only)
- 38 Centraal Station – Lage Weide – Maarssen
- 41 Utrecht Centraal – Bunnik – Wijk bij Duurstede (U-Link)
- 47 Utrecht Centraal – Hoograven – Houten
- 50 Utrecht Centraal – Zeist – Doorn – Veenendaal / Wageningen (U-Link)
- 55 Utrecht Centraal – Tuindorp-Oost – Maartensdijk
- 63 Utrecht Centraal – Vianen
- 65 Utrecht Centraal – Plettenburg – Vianen
- 73 Zeist-Centrum – Utrecht Centraal – Leidsche Rijn – Maarssen (U-Link)
- 74 Driebergen-Zeist – Zeist West – Utrecht Centraal – Jutphaas – Vianen
- 77 Nieuwegein-Centrum – Galecop – Utrecht Centraal -De Bilt – Bilthoven Station (U-Link)
- 81 Utrecht Centraal – Meerkerk
- 85 Utrecht Centraal – Schoonrewoerd – Leerdam
- 90 Utrecht Centraal – Papendorp – Gelkenes Industrieterrein
- 94 Utrecht Centraal – Papendorp – Ameide
- 102 Utrecht Centraal – Woerden
- 107 Utrecht Centraal – Gouda
- 120 Utrecht Centraal – Breukelen – Amsterdam Bijlmer ArenA
- 195 Utrecht Centraal – Rotterdam Capelsebrug (peak hour only)
- 241 Utrecht Centraal – Wijk bij Duurstede (via A12, peak hour only)
- 247 Utrecht Centraal – Kanaleneiland – Houten (peak hour only)
- 285 Utrecht Centraal – Papendorp – Leerdam (peak hour only)
- 295 Utrecht Centraal – Rotterdam Capelsebrug
- 387 Utrecht Centraal – Gorinchem
- 388 Utrecht Centraal – Sliedrecht – Rotterdam Kralingse Zoom
- 400 Utrecht Centraal – Vianen – Sleeuwijk Tol – Raamsdonksveer – Oosterhout (Brabantliner)
- 401 Utrecht Centraal – Vianen – Sleeuwijk Tol – Hank – Breda (Brabantliner)

International bus services (Flixbus, Ecolines) call at a separate bus stop near the station.

== Tram services ==
Utrecht Centraal has two light rail (sneltram) stops: Jaarbeursplein on the west side of the station, and Centrumzijde ("downtown side") on the east side of the station.
There are three tram routes serving Utrecht Centraal:

Line	Operator	Route
20	U-OV	Nieuwegein-Zuid – Nieuwegein Stadscentrum – P+R Westraven – Jaarbeursplein – Centrumzijde – P+R Science Park
21	U-OV	IJsselstein-Zuid – Nieuwegein Stadscentrum – P+R Westraven – Jaarbeursplein – Centrumzijde – P+R Science Park
22	U-OV	Centrumzijde – P+R Science Park

On weekdays until 21:30, all three routes travel between Centrumzijde and P+R Science Park (in the Uithof district). In late evening, and on weekends or holidays, there is no service to P+R Science Park at which times tram routes 20 and 21 will terminate at Centrumzijde, and there is no tram 22 service.

== Bicycles ==
On both sides of the station, there is a large three-floor bicycle parking station. The parking on the east side is the world's largest bicycle parking station. It opened fully on 19 August 2019 at the cost of an estimated €48 million and holds 12,500 bicycles.

== Gallery ==
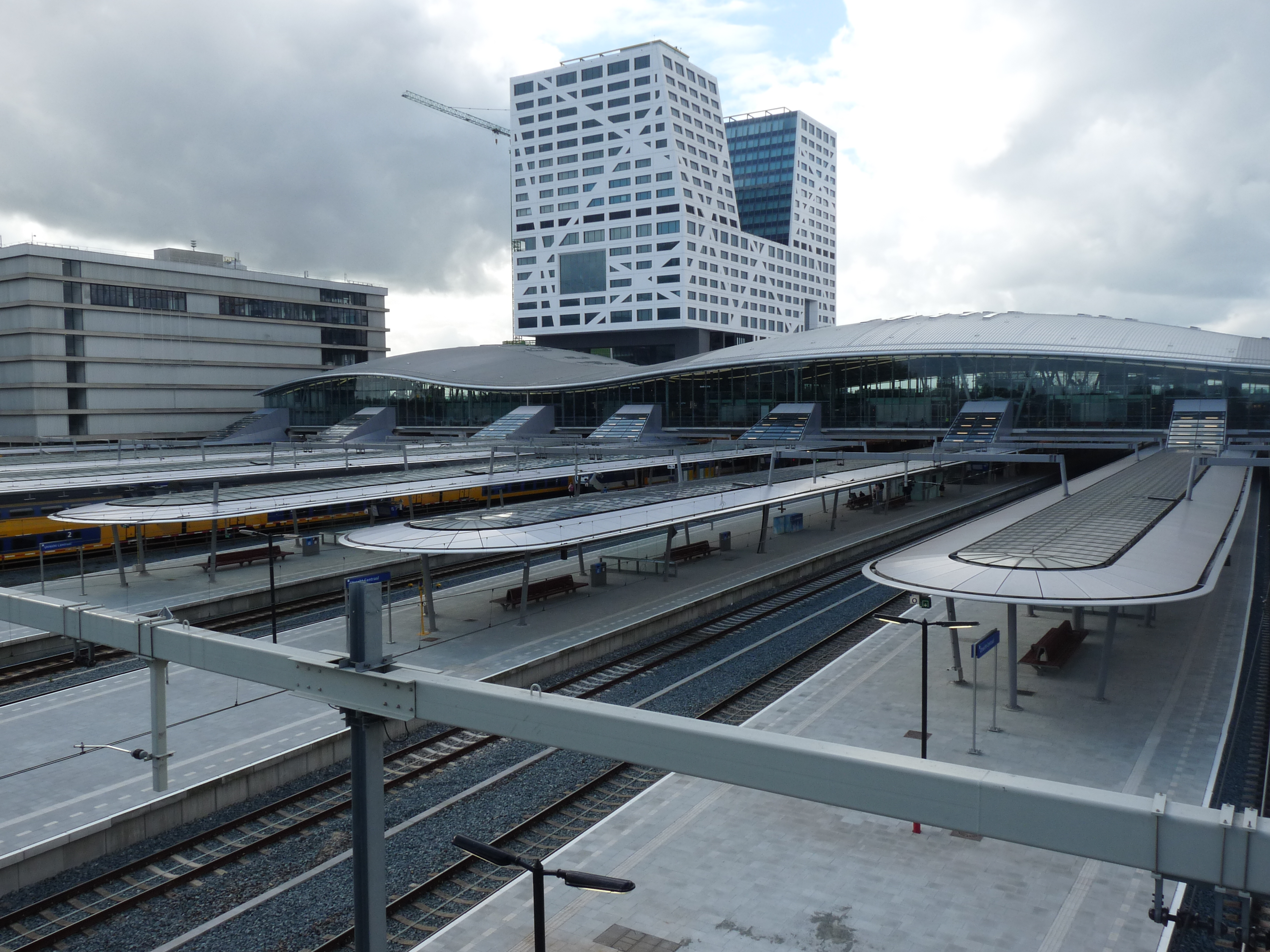
Railway tracks seen from the skybridge

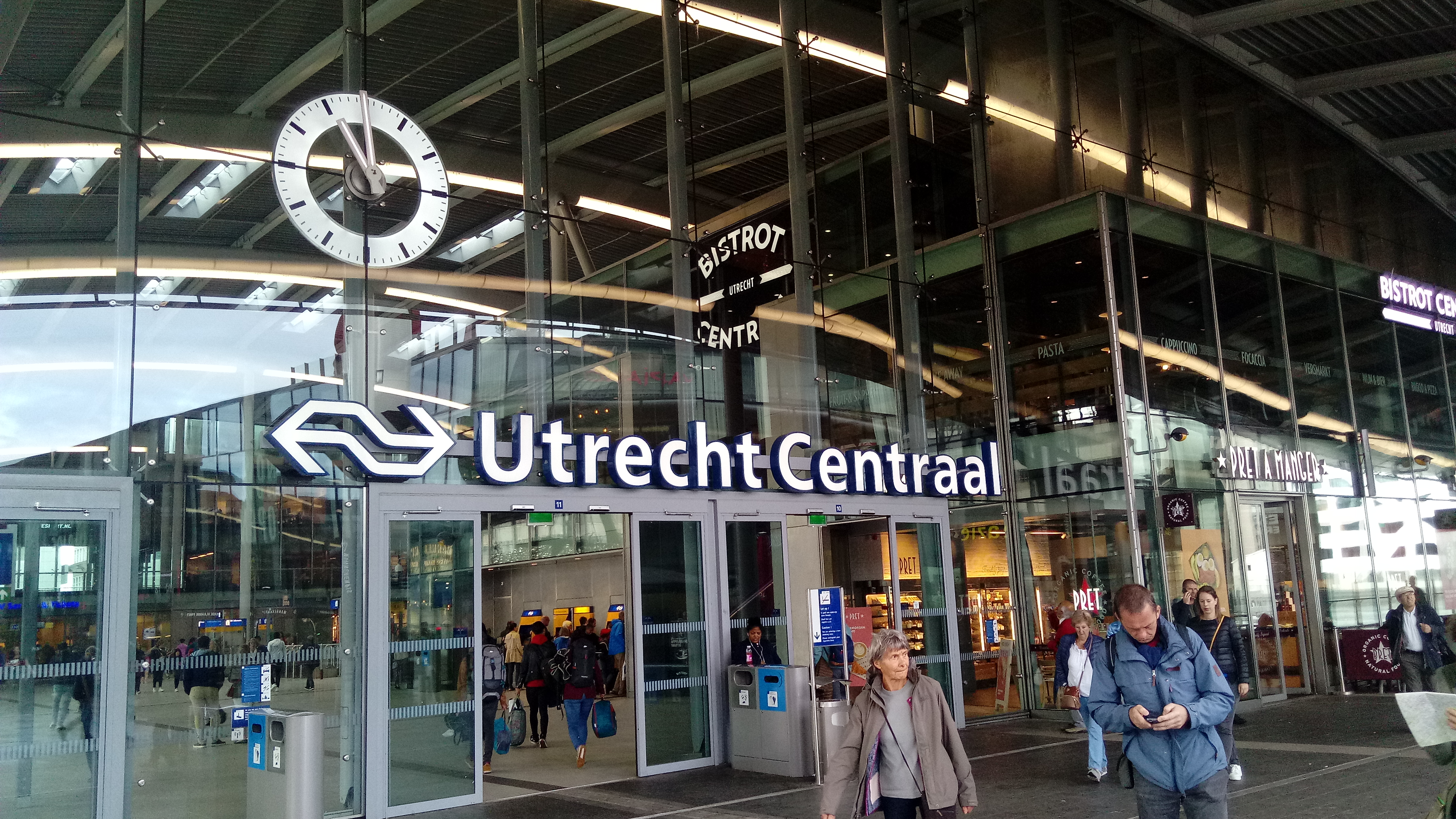
Entrance of the station

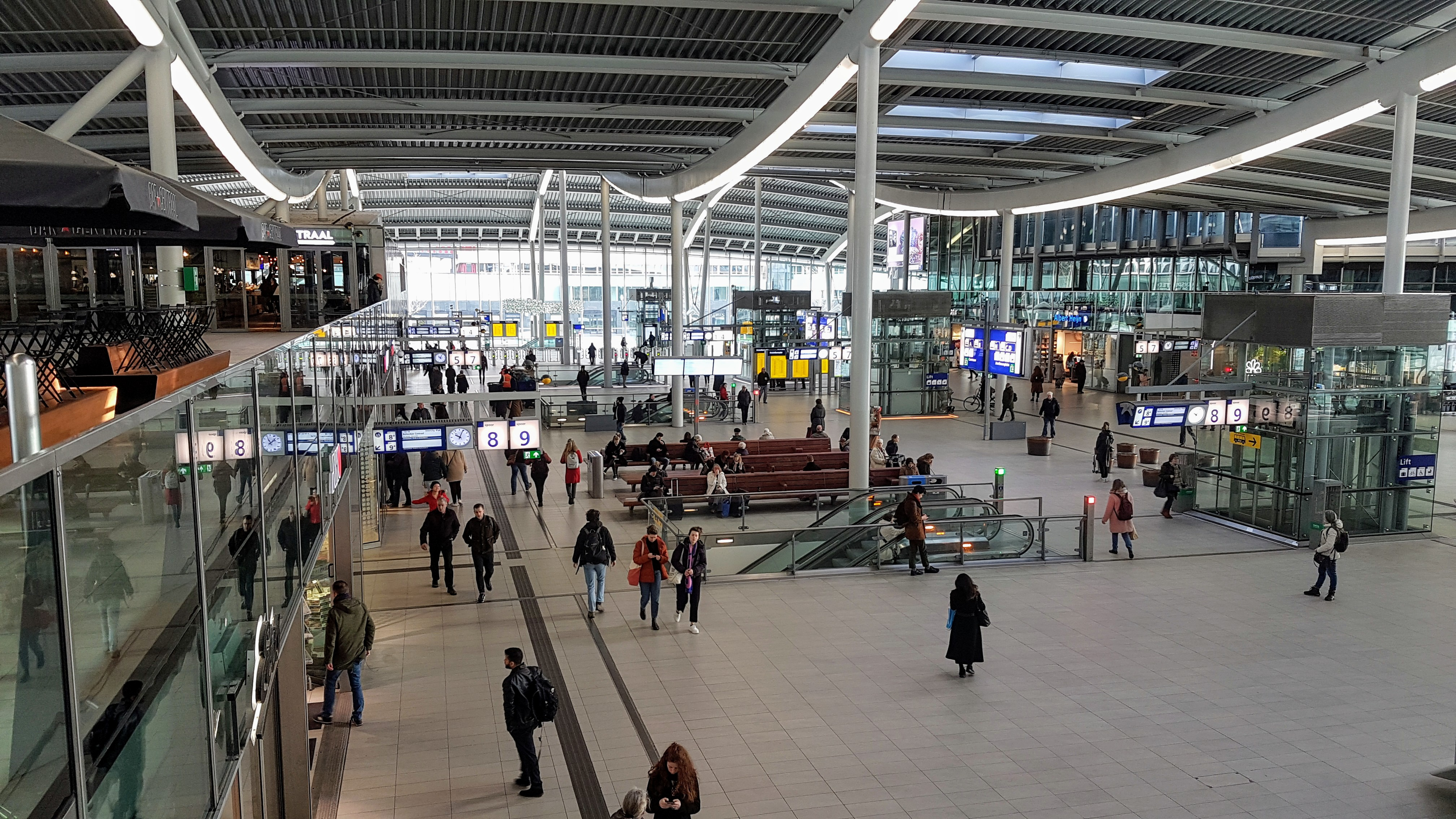
Main concourse area

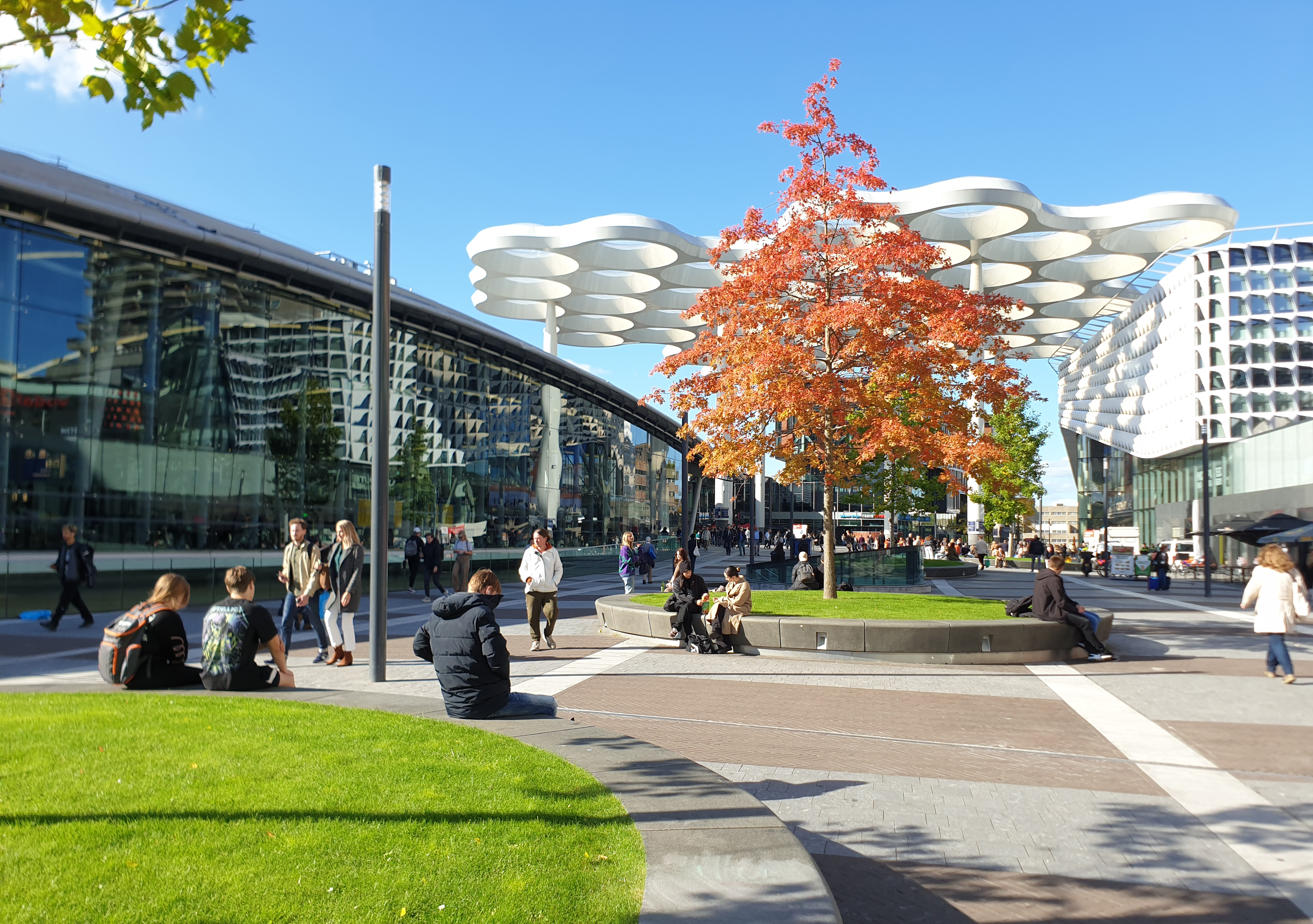
Station square

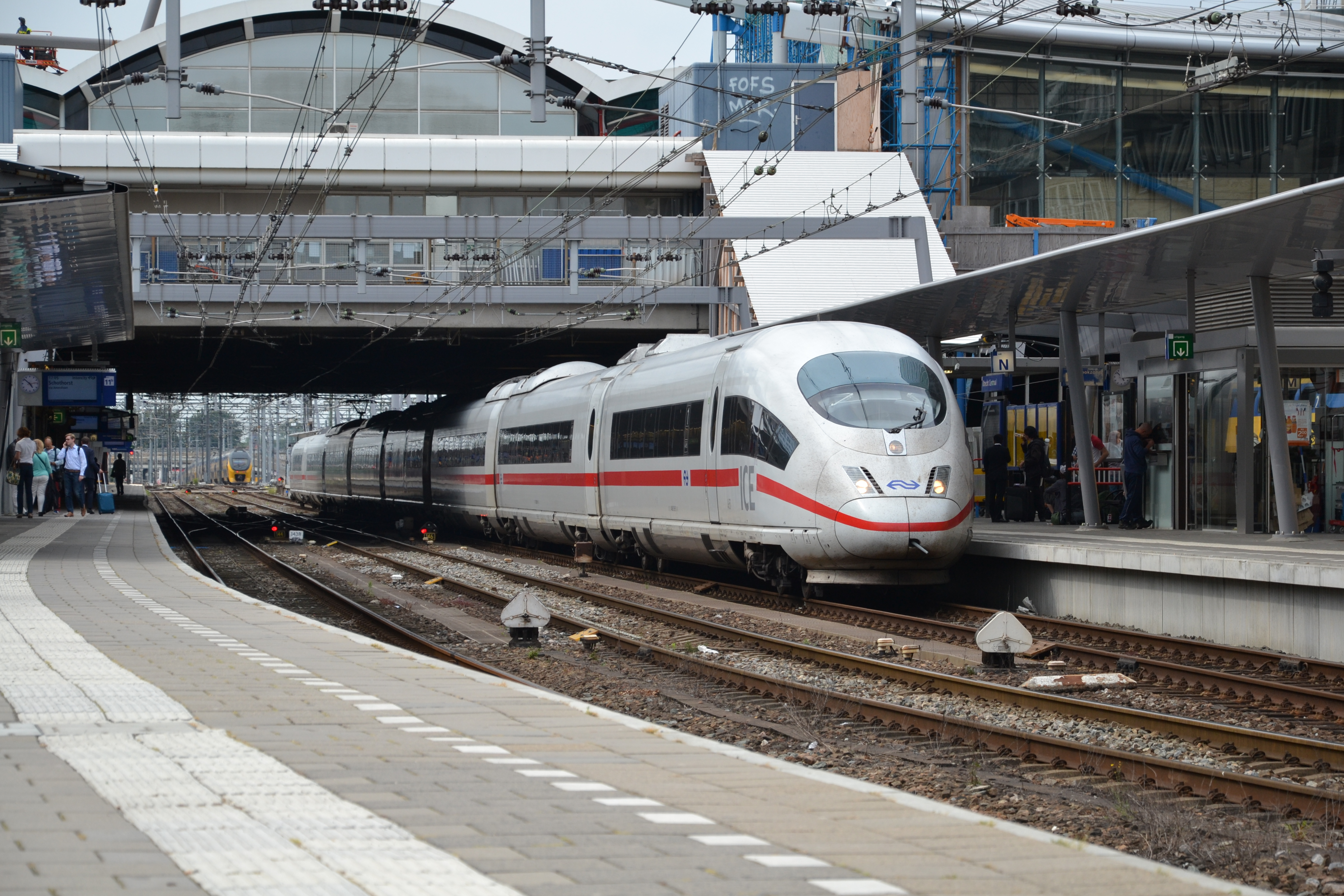
ICE 3 in Utrecht Centraal

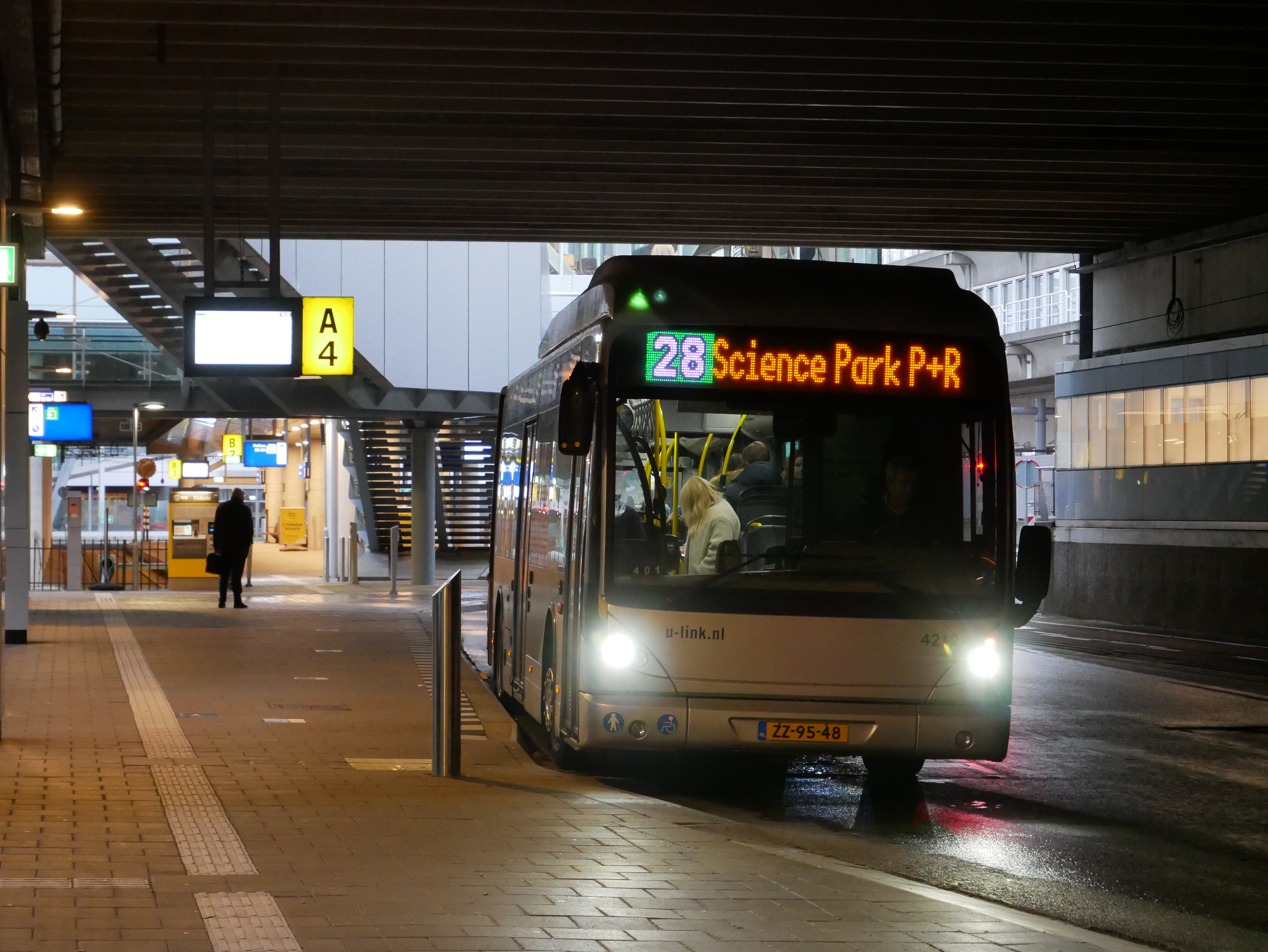
Bus station below the station

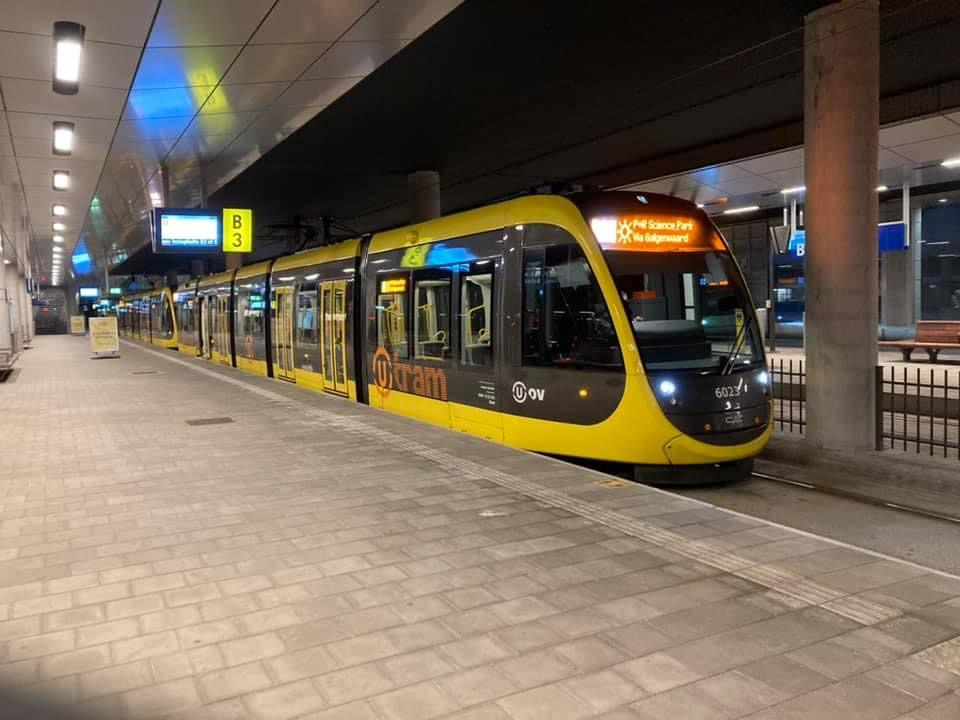
Tram stop below the station

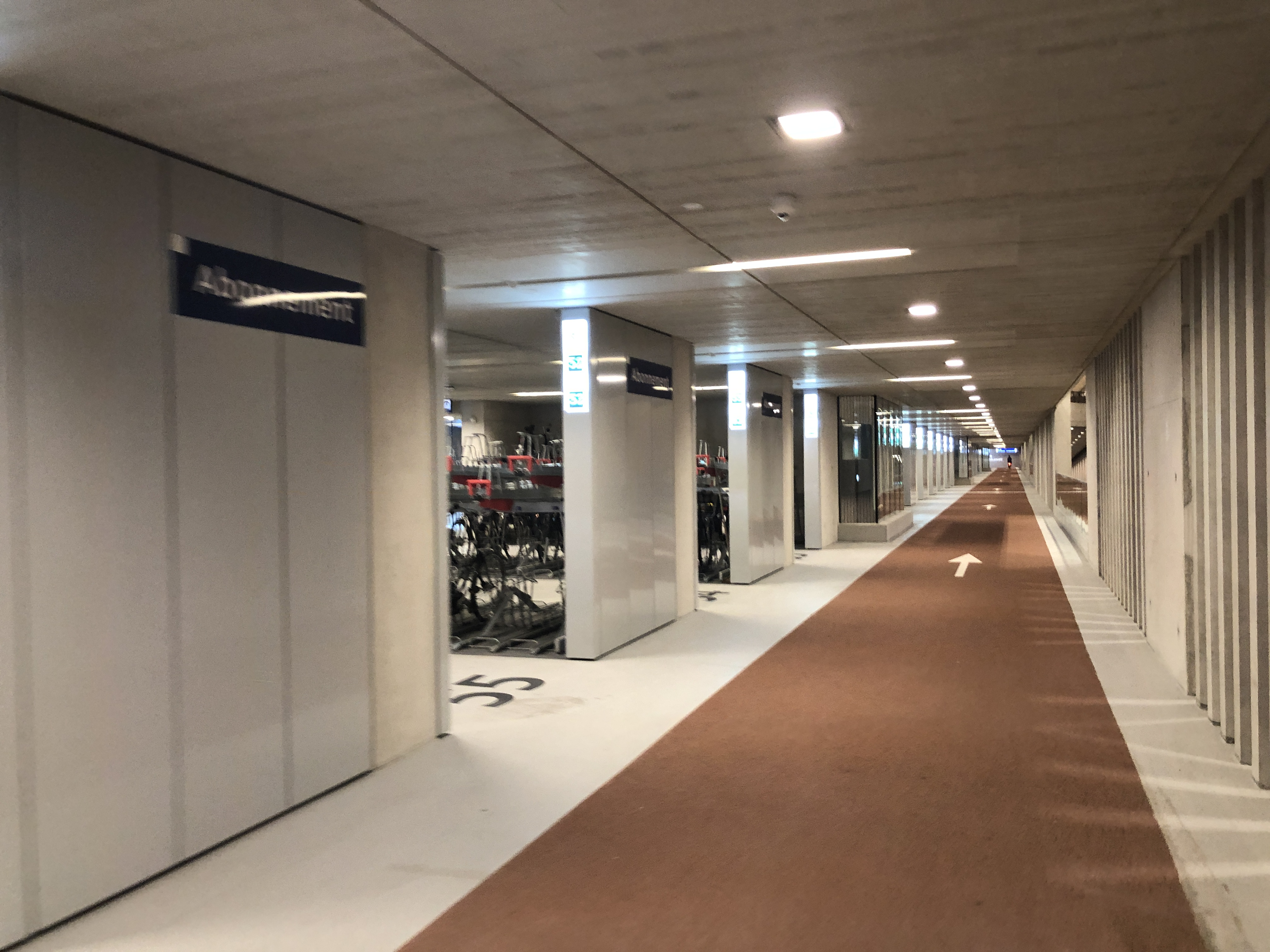
Bicycle parking
