= Utrecht–Rotterdam railway =

Railway line in the Netherlands

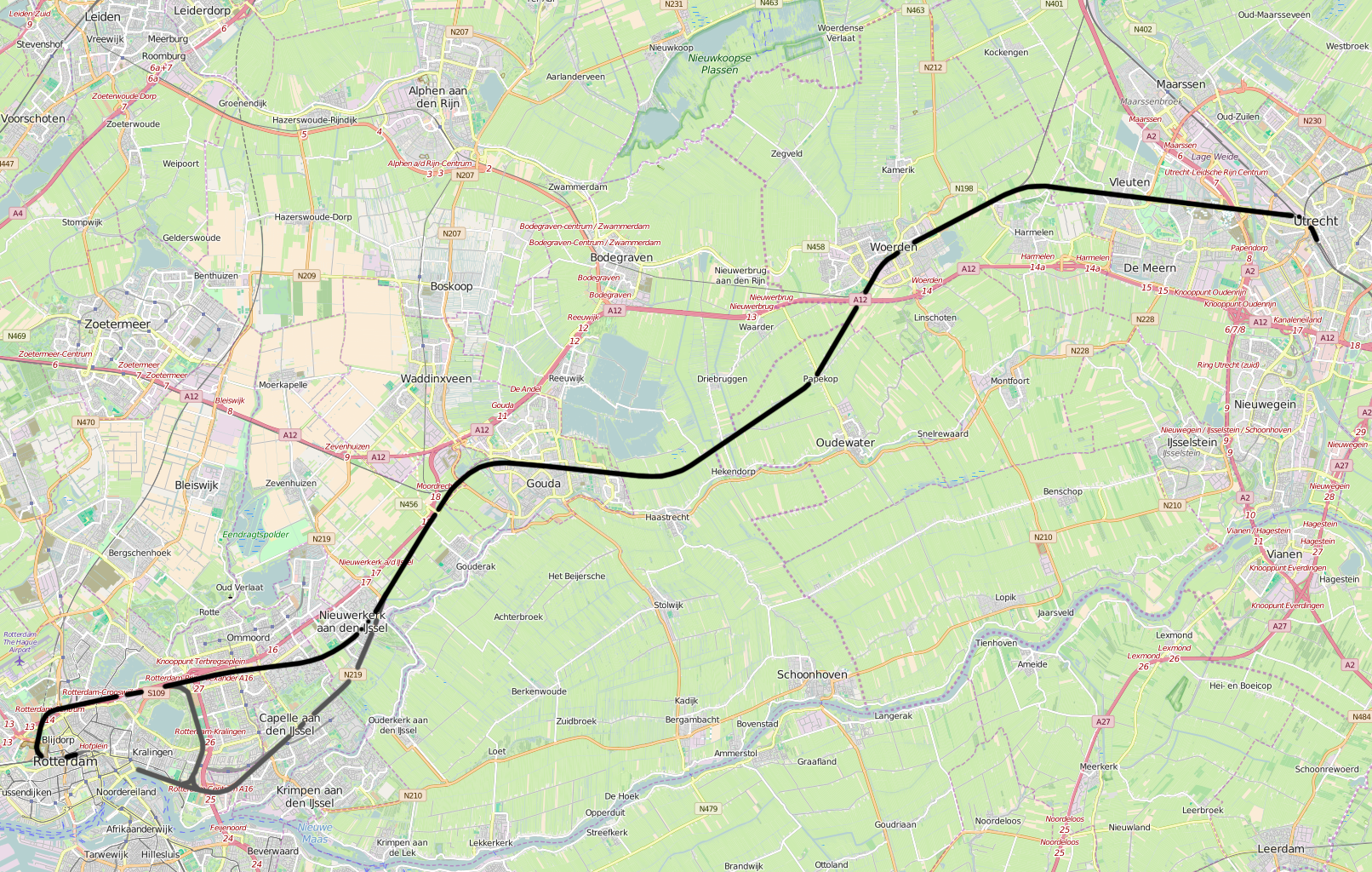

Overview
- Status: Operational
- Locale: Netherlands
- Termini: Utrecht Centraal railway station; Rotterdam Centraal railway station

Service
- Operator(s): Nederlandse Spoorwegen

History
- Opened: 1855–1858

Technical
- Line length: 56 km (35 mi)
- Number of tracks: double track
- Track gauge: 1,435 mm (4 ft 8 1/2 in) standard gauge
- Electrification: 1.5 kV DC

The Utrecht–Rotterdam railway is a heavily used railway in the Netherlands, running from Utrecht to Rotterdam, passing through Woerden and Gouda. The line was opened between 1855 and 1858. The western terminus was originally the Rotterdam Maas station. In 1899, a connection with the Rotterdam Delftse Poort station (the present Rotterdam Centraal station) was made. In 1953 a new line was opened between Nieuwerkerk aan den IJssel station and Rotterdam Centraal station; the now obsolete Maas station was closed.

== Stations ==
The main interchange stations on the Utrecht–Rotterdam railway are:

- Utrecht Centraal: to Amsterdam, Zwolle, Arnhem and Eindhoven
- Gouda: to The Hague and Leiden
- Rotterdam Centraal: to The Hague, Breda, Brussels and Amsterdam
