= Veenendaal =

- Municipality
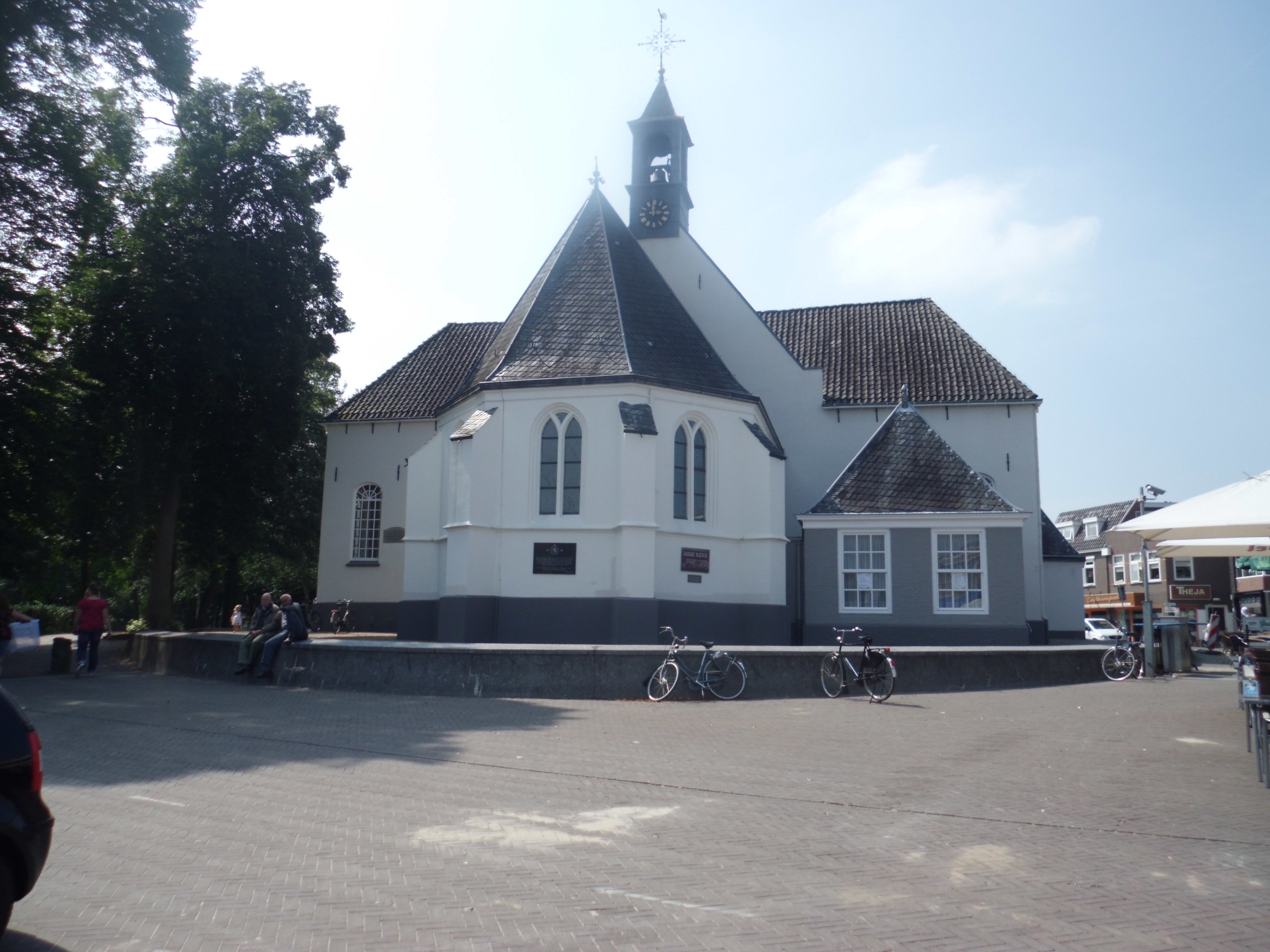
- Church in Veenendaal

- Flag Coat of arms

- Location in Utrecht
- Coordinates: 52°1′N 5°33′E
- Country: Netherlands
- Province: Utrecht

Government
  - Body: Municipal council
  - Mayor: Gert-Jan Kats

Area
  - Total: 19.72 km^{2} (7.61 sq mi)
  - Land: 19.46 km^{2} (7.51 sq mi)
  - Water: 0.26 km^{2} (0.10 sq mi)
- Elevation: 6 m (20 ft)

Population (January 2021)
  - Total: 66,912
  - Density: 3,438/km^{2} (8,900/sq mi)
- Demonym: Veenendaler
- Time zone: UTC+1 (CET)
  - Summer (DST): UTC+2 (CEST)
- Postcode: 3900–3907
- Area code: 0318
- Website: www.veenendaal.nl

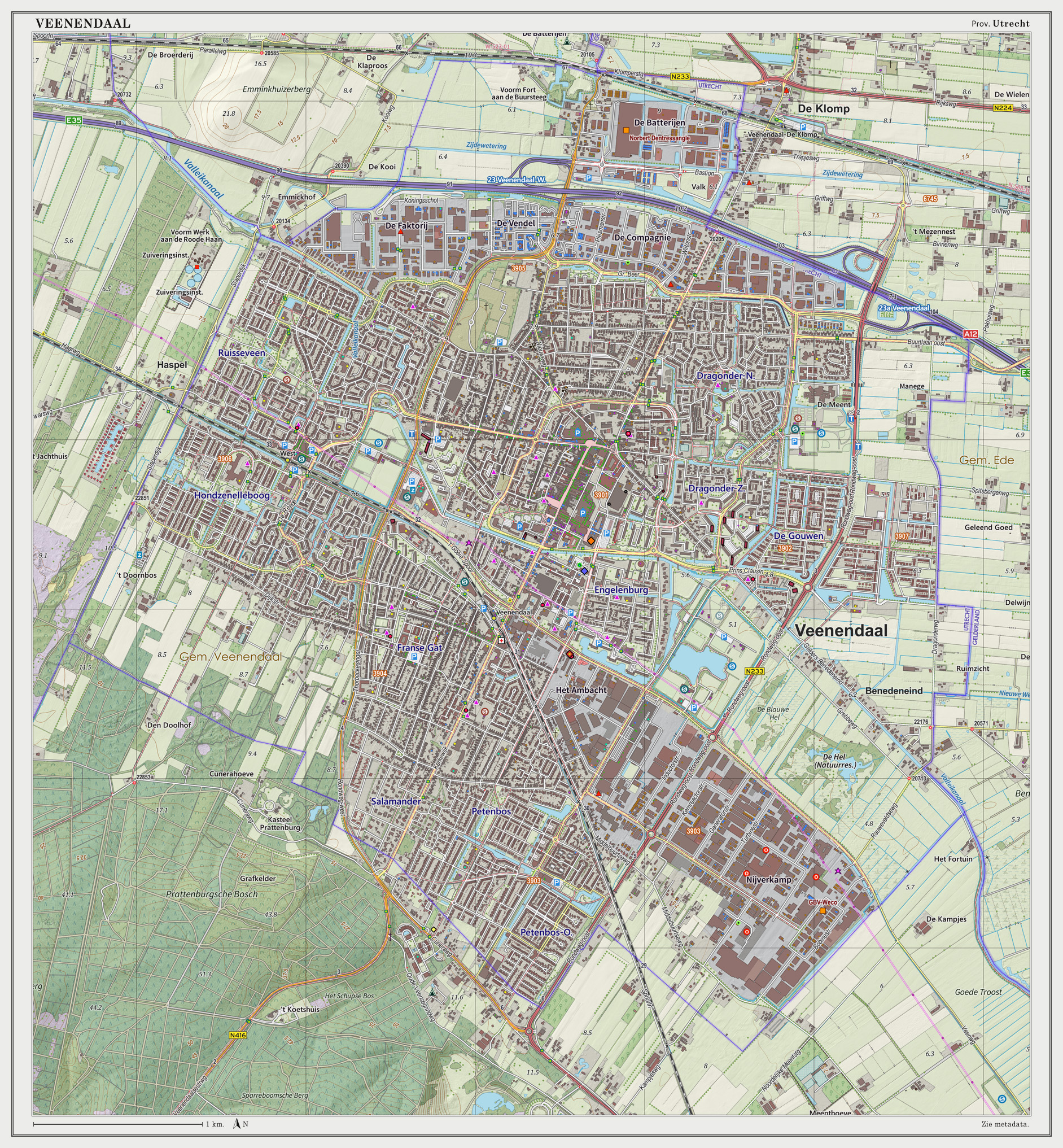
Topographic map of Veenendaal (town), as of March 2014

Veenendaal (Dutch pronunciation: [ˈveːnə(n)ˌdaːl]) is a municipality and a town in central Netherlands, located in the province of Utrecht. Veenendaal is the only population centre within its administrative borders. The municipality had a population of 70,000 inhabitants on 8 August 2024 and covers an area of 19.72 km^{2} (7.61 sq mi).

== History ==
The original village was founded in the middle of the 16th century as a peat colony from which it got its name. Veen is the Dutch word for fen and daal for dale.

The village was administratively part of two nearby towns, which were themselves part of two different provinces of the Dutch Republic. The southern half belonged to Rhenen in Utrecht, the northeastern half to Ede in Guelders. In 1795, with the arrival of French troops in the country and inspired by the ideas of the French Revolution, the citizens declared their independence. When turmoil of the Napoleonic era was settled and the Netherlands was reformed as a monarchy, only the southern part would retain its independence.

In the 19th century, wool and tobacco industry became Veenendaal's largest source of income. Big factories dominated the otherwise small rural town.

In 1855, Veenendaal was hit by a flood, which caused many residents to flee to Utrecht. A monument was erected near the railway station.

In 1960 the northern part of town, still controlled by Ede, was merged with the self-governing part of town. Further lands of Rhenen and also Renswoude were ceded to allow for new housing developments. The population grew rapidly from about 10,000 in the 1920s, to 23,000 in 1960, to the 68,000+ inhabitants of today.

In 1997 the town was elected the greenest city in Europe and in 2004 of the Netherlands.

Like most Dutch cities, Veenendaal is well adapted to the high number of cyclists. A large network of bike paths make it convenient to cycle to various destinations and within the town, the bike is a popular mean of transportation. In 2000 and 2020, Veenendaal was chosen as Fietsstad of the year, recognised as being the top city for cycling in the Netherlands.

== Railway stations ==
Veenendaal is home to three railway stations Veenendaal-West, Veenendaal-Centrum and Veenendaal de Klomp. Veenendaal Centrum and Veenendaal west both connect to each other and go to cities and villages: Bunnik, Rhenen and Maarn. While Veenendaal de Klomp connects directly to cities like: Ede-Wageningen Arnhem And Driebergen-Rijsenburg.

== Religion ==
The city is known for being one of the bigger cities within the Dutch Bible Belt (together with Ede and Kampen), as it is inhabited by a considerable number (though not a majority) of conservative Protestants.

== Notable residents ==
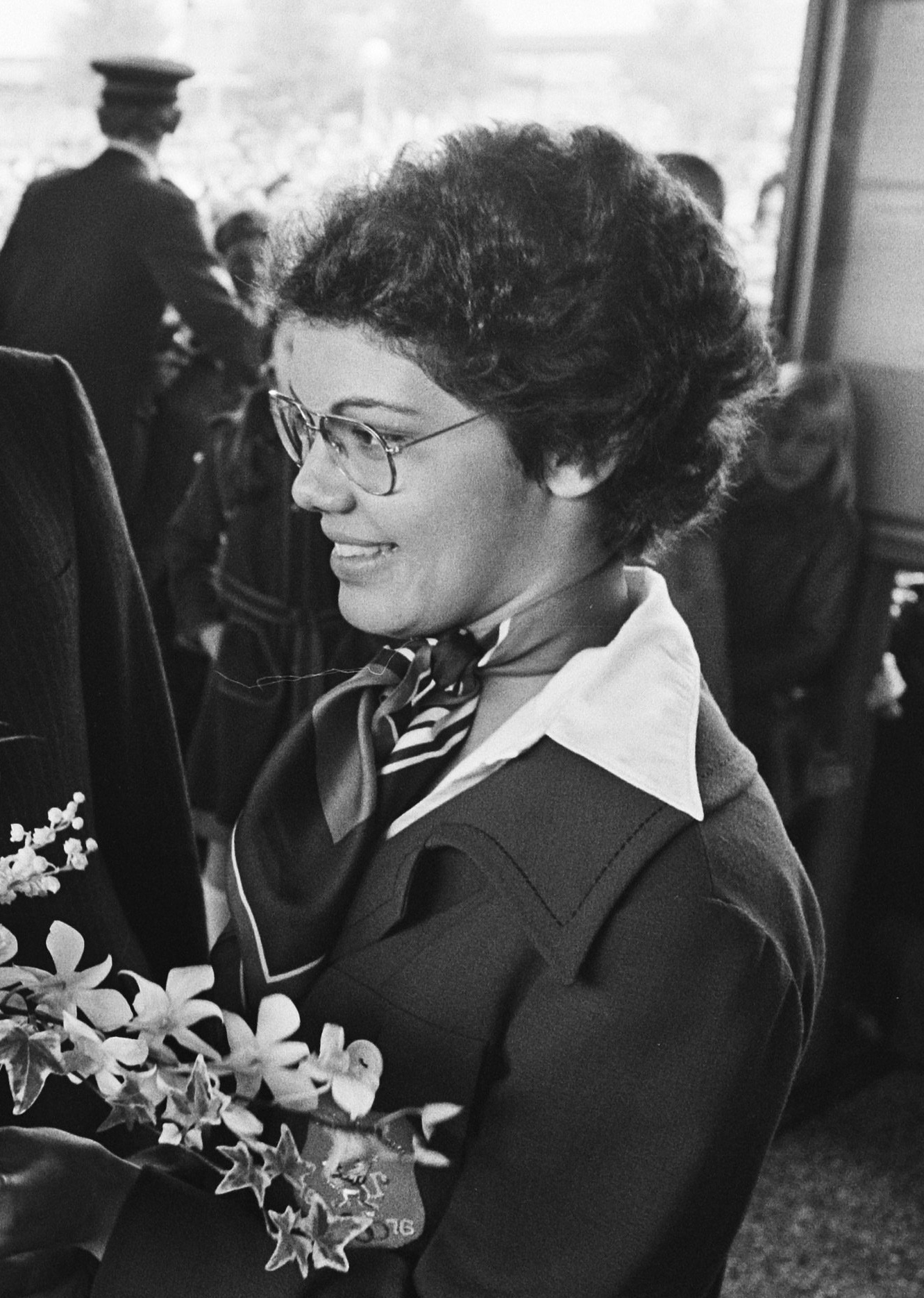
Linda Faber, 1976

- Willem van Manen (1875–1963), Dutch tailor and shortest serving member of the House of Representatives
- Antonie Aris van de Loosdrecht (1885-1917) a Dutch missionary to the Dutch East Indies
- Kees Stip (1913-2001) a Dutch epigram poet
- Bram van Ojik (born 1954) a Dutch politician, diplomat and activist
- Roelof Bisschop (born 1956) a Dutch historian and politician, Veenendaal municipal councillor 1986 to 2007
- Stef Bos (born 1961) a Dutch singer who lives in Cape Town, South Africa
- Frits Wester (born 1962) a Dutch journalist, political analyst on Dutch TV
- Jan Engelaar (born 1968) stage name DJ Jean, a Dutch disc jockey
- Carla Dik-Faber (born 1971) a Dutch art historian and politician, Veenendaal municipal councillor 2003 to 2010
- Yuri Landman (born 1973) experimental musical instrument builder
- Bas Oskam (born 1980) stage name Noisecontrollers, a Dutch DJ and hardstyle music producer
- Sandra Beckerman (born 1983) a Dutch MP
- Joram Metekohy (born 1983) stage name Wildstylez, a Dutch hardstyle DJ and record producer
- Willem Rebergen (born 1985) stage name Headhunterz, a Dutch DJ and record producer
- Nicky Romero (born 1989) a Dutch musician, DJ, record producer and remixer

=== Sport ===
- Linda Faber (born 1960) a former freestyle swimmer, competed at the 1976 Summer Olympics
- Marco van den Berg (born 1965) a Dutch retired basketball player and current coach
- Harry van der Meer (born 1973) a former water polo forward who participated in three Summer Olympics
- Barry Ditewig (born 1977) a Dutch football goalkeeper with over 400 club caps
- Botic van de Zandschulp (born 1995) a tennis player currently ranked first among Dutch men
- Dylan van Baarle (born 1992) a Dutch cyclist currently driving for Jumbo-Visma
- Anouar El Azzouzi (born 2001) a Moroccan Dutch Football player that plays for PEC Zwolle
- Oussama El Azzouzi (born 2001) a Moroccan Dutch Football Player that plays for Bologna FC 1909

== Twin Towns ==
- Olomouc,Moravia,Czech Republic

== Gallery ==
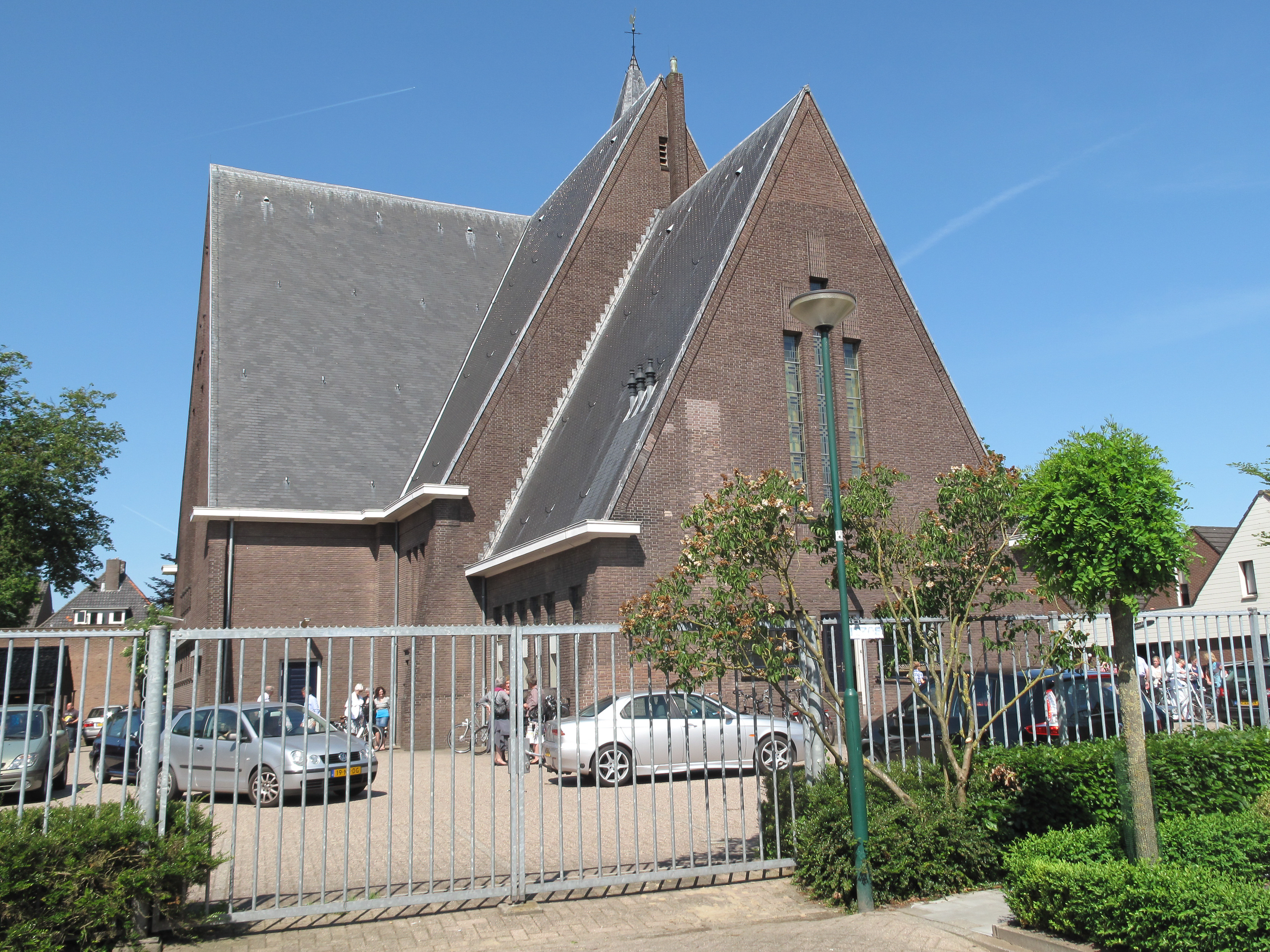
Veenendaal, reformed church

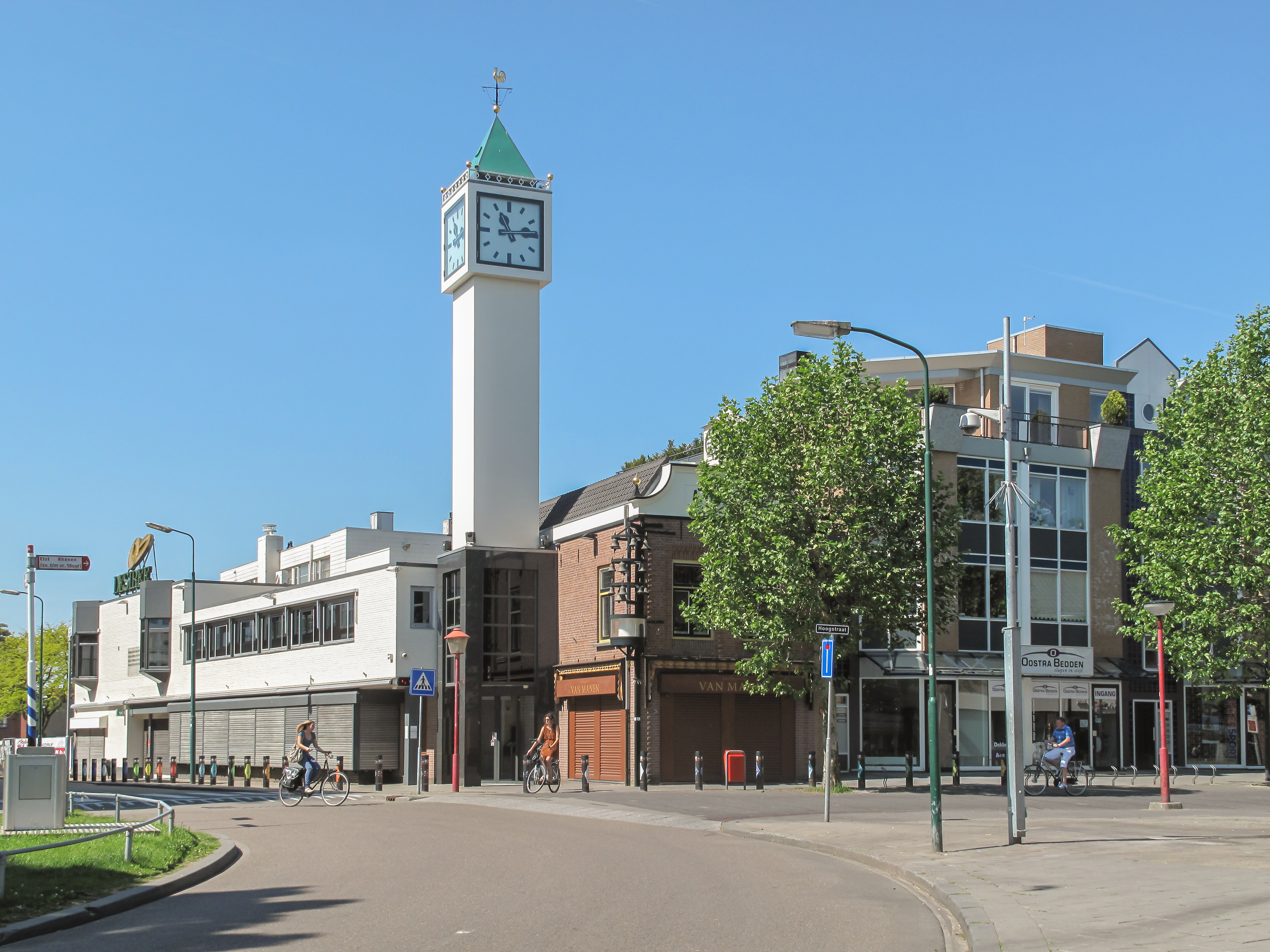
Veenendaal, tower in the street

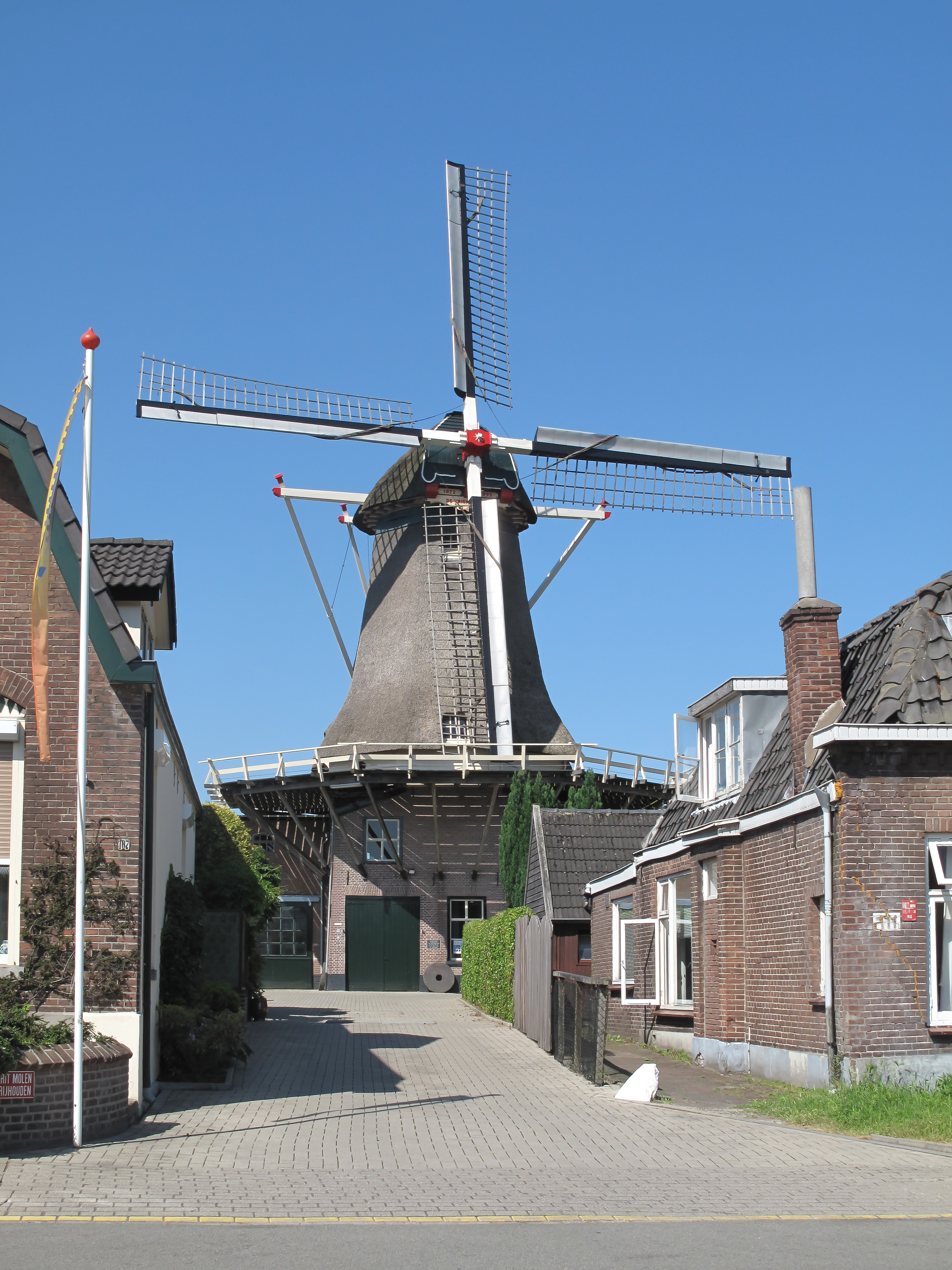
Veenendaal, windmill: stellingmolen de Vriendschap

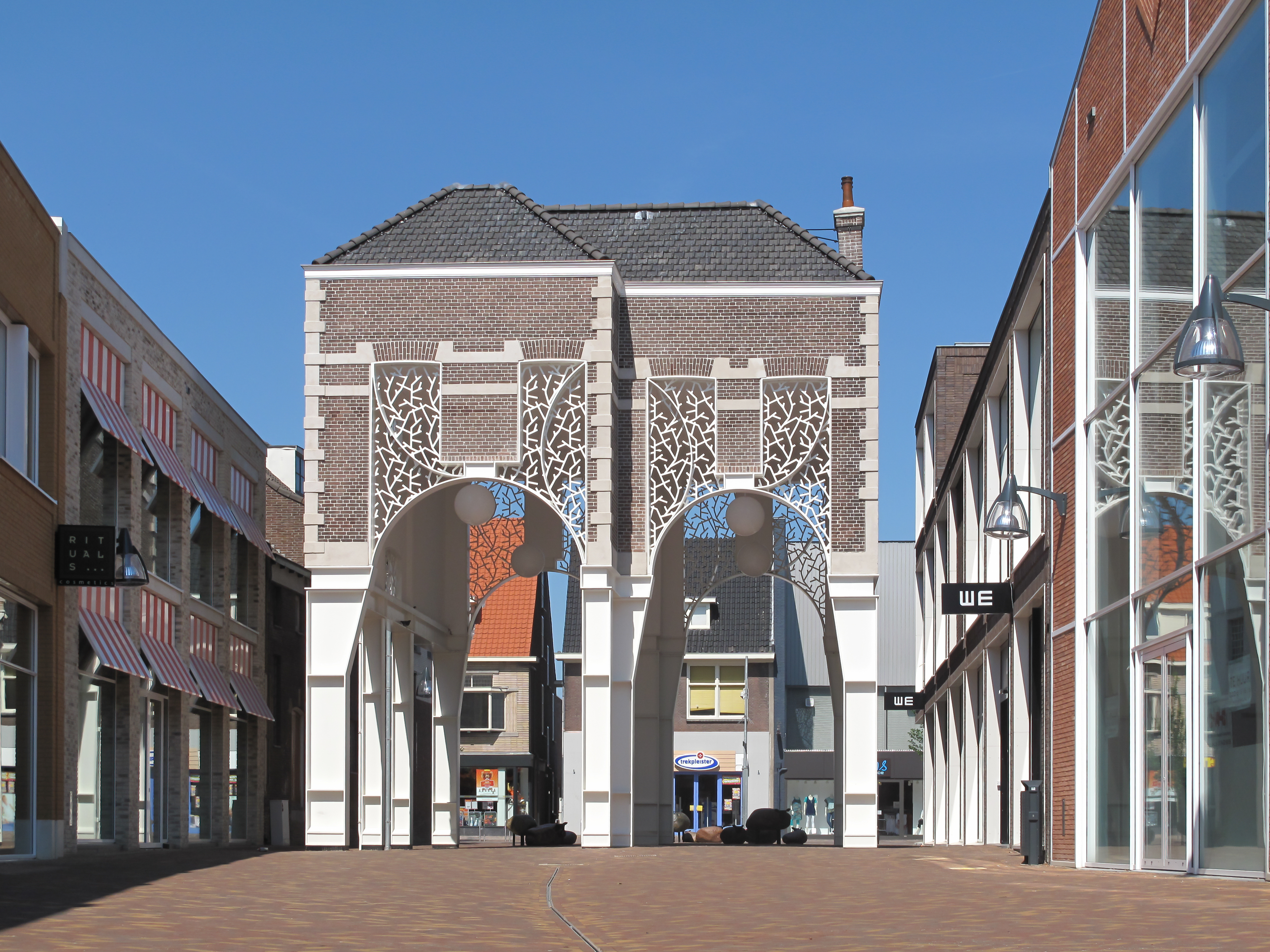
Veenendaal, 'towngate': de Bernard van Kreelpoort
