= Maarn railway station =

Railway station in the Netherlands

Maarn
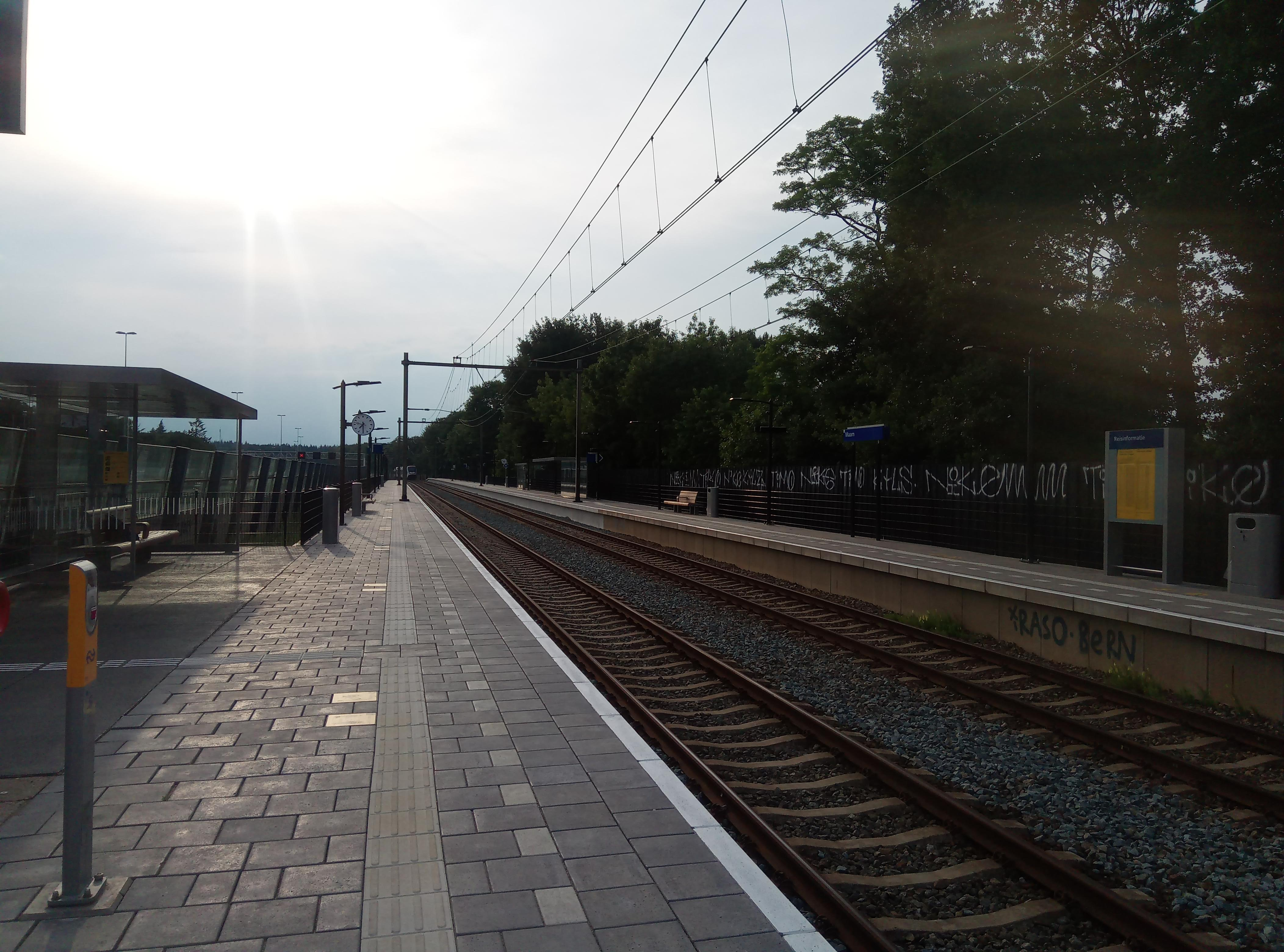

General information
- Location: Netherlands
- Coordinates: 52°03′51″N 5°22′11″E
- Line: Amsterdam–Arnhem railway

Services
Preceding station	Nederlandse Spoorwegen	Following station
Driebergen-Zeist towards Breukelen	NS Sprinter 7300	Veenendaal West towards Rhenen
Location
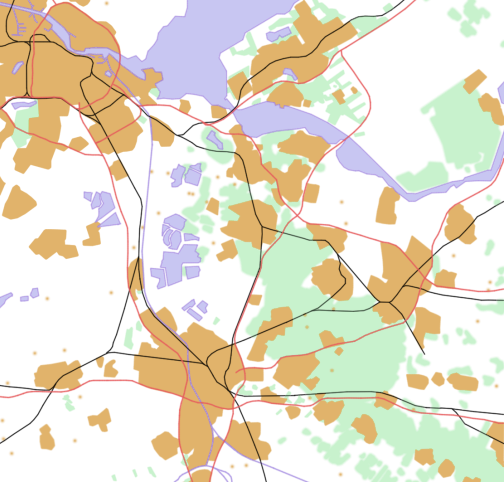
- Location within Northeastern Randstad

Maarn is a railway station in the centre of Maarn, Netherlands, next to the A12. The station opened on 15 March 1845 and is located on the Amsterdam–Arnhem railway. The services are operated by Nederlandse Spoorwegen.

The station was moved 1 km east in 1972, and in 2005 had approximately 1,590 passengers per day.

Several kilometres further the Kesteren–Amersfoort railway branches off to Veenendaal and Rhenen.

== Train services ==
The following services currently call at Maarn:

- 2x per hour local service (sprinter) Amsterdam - Utrecht - Rhenen
- 2x per hour local service (sprinter) Breukelen - Utrecht - Veenendaal Centrum

== Bus service ==
Operated by Connexxion

- 82 - Amersfoort - Leusden - Woudenberg - Maarsbergen - Maarn - Station Maarn - Doorn (2x Per Hour, 1x Per Hour Saturdays)

This service stops 200m east of the station.

== Gallery ==
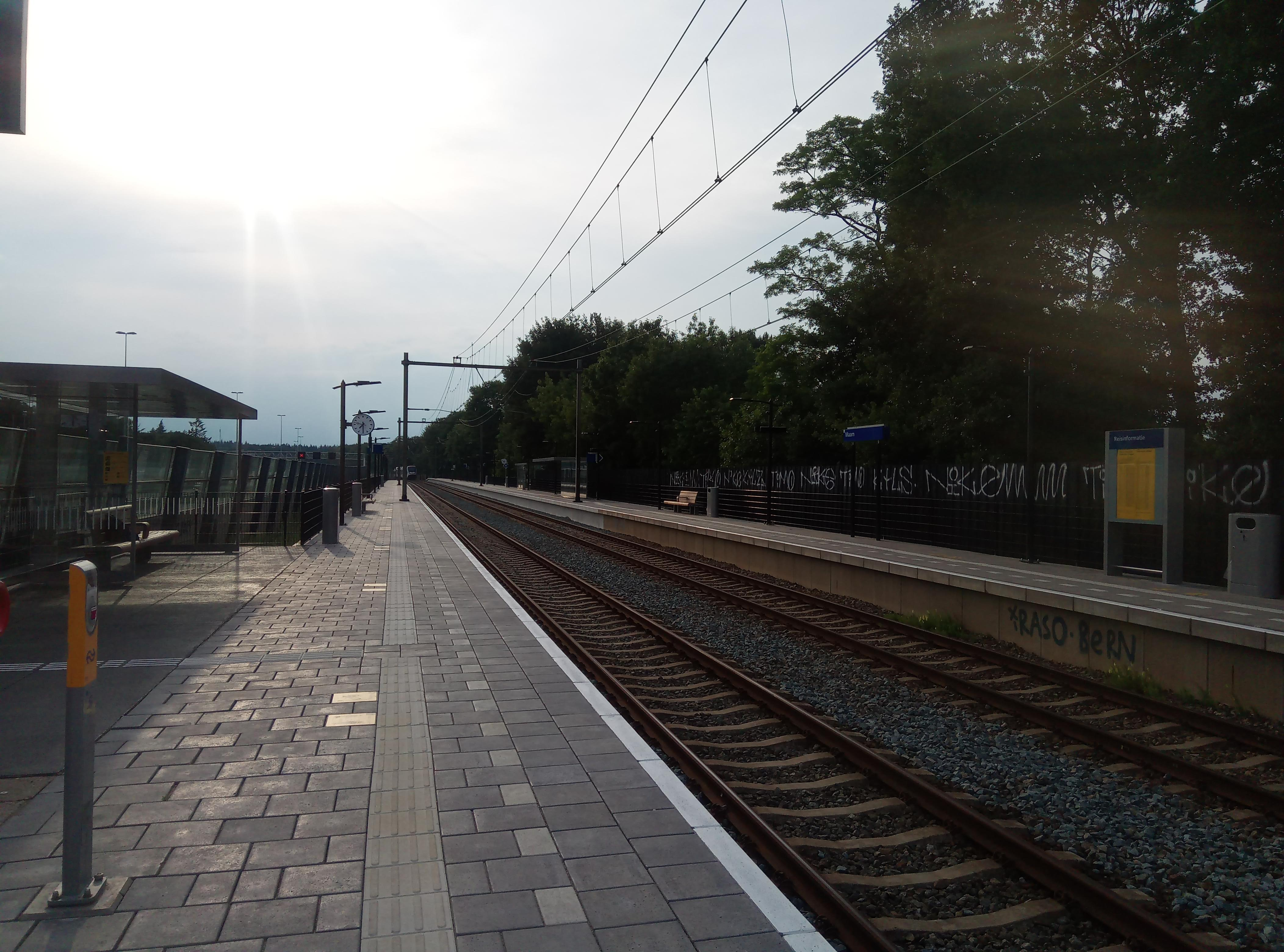
The Station in 2020

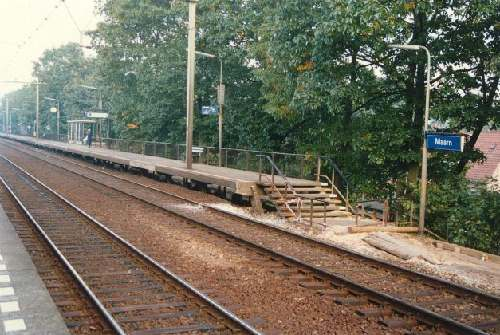
The Station in 1992

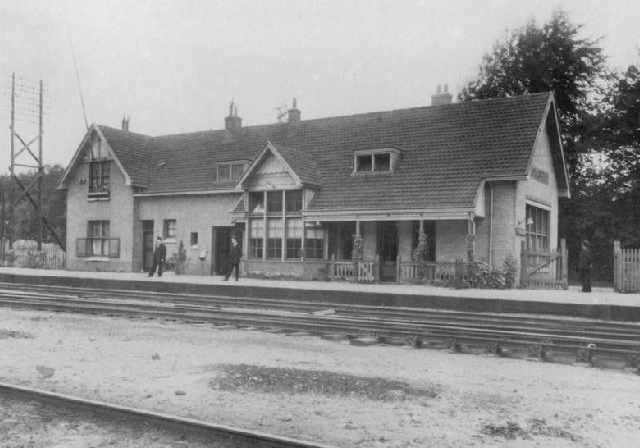
The Station in 1910
