= Veenendaal West railway station =

Railway station in Veenendaal, the Netherlands

Veenendaal West
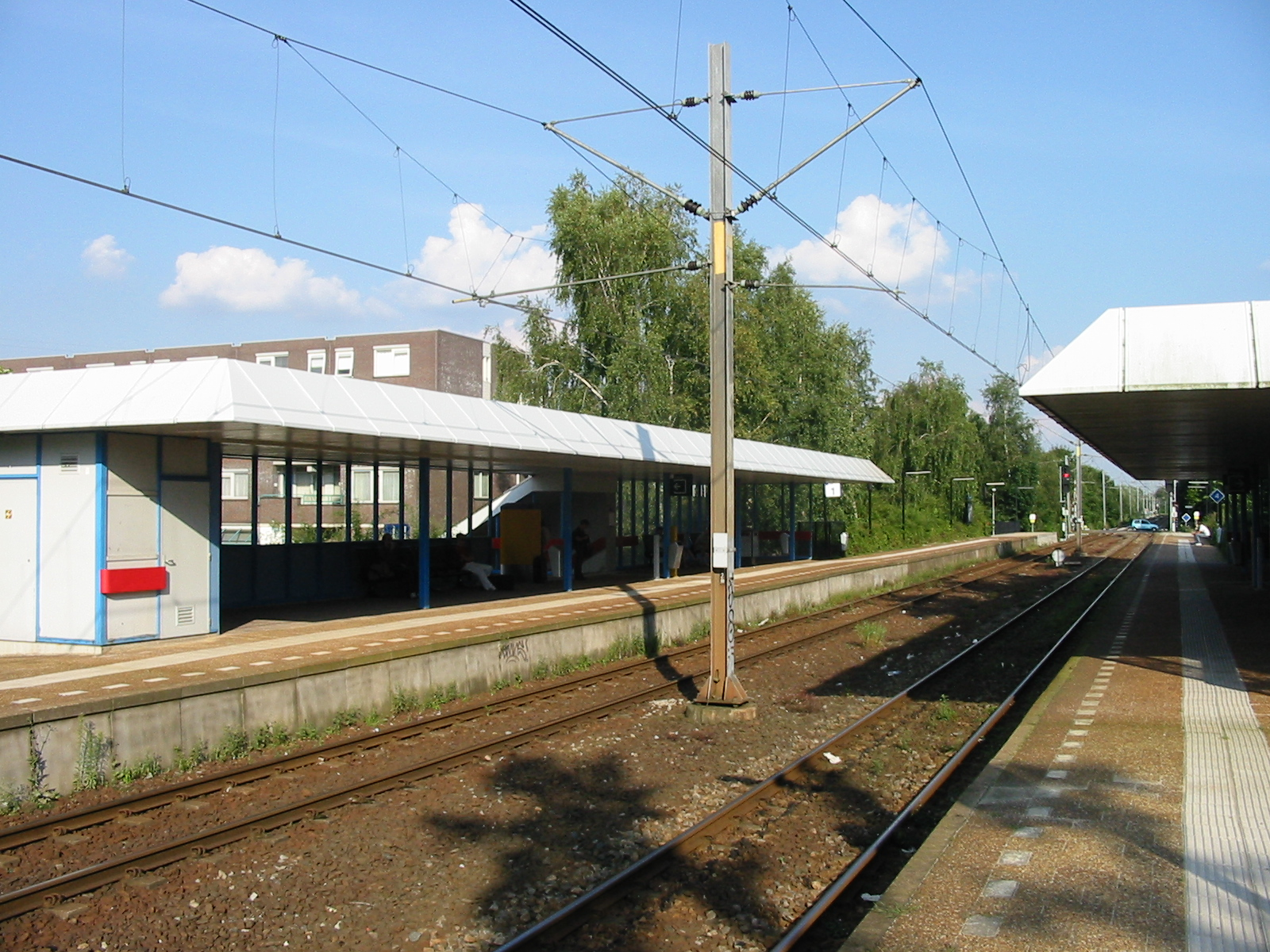

General information
- Location: Netherlands
- Coordinates: 52°1′41″N 5°31′53″E
- Line: Kesteren–Amersfoort railway

History
- Opened: 1981

Services
Preceding station	Nederlandse Spoorwegen	Following station
Maarn towards Breukelen	NS Sprinter 7300	Veenendaal Centrum towards Rhenen
Location
- Location within Netherlands

Veenendaal West is a railway station located in Veenendaal, Netherlands. The station was opened in 1981, and is located on the Kesteren–Amersfoort railway. The train services are operated by Nederlandse Spoorwegen.

== Train services ==
The following services currently call at Veenendaal West:

- 2x per hour local service (sprinter) (Amsterdam -) Breukelen - Utrecht (- Veenendaal Centrum) (peak hours only)
- 2x per hour local service (sprinter) Breukelen - Utrecht - Rhenen
