= Utrecht Vaartsche Rijn railway station =

Railway station in Utrecht, the Netherlands

Utrecht Vaartsche Rijn
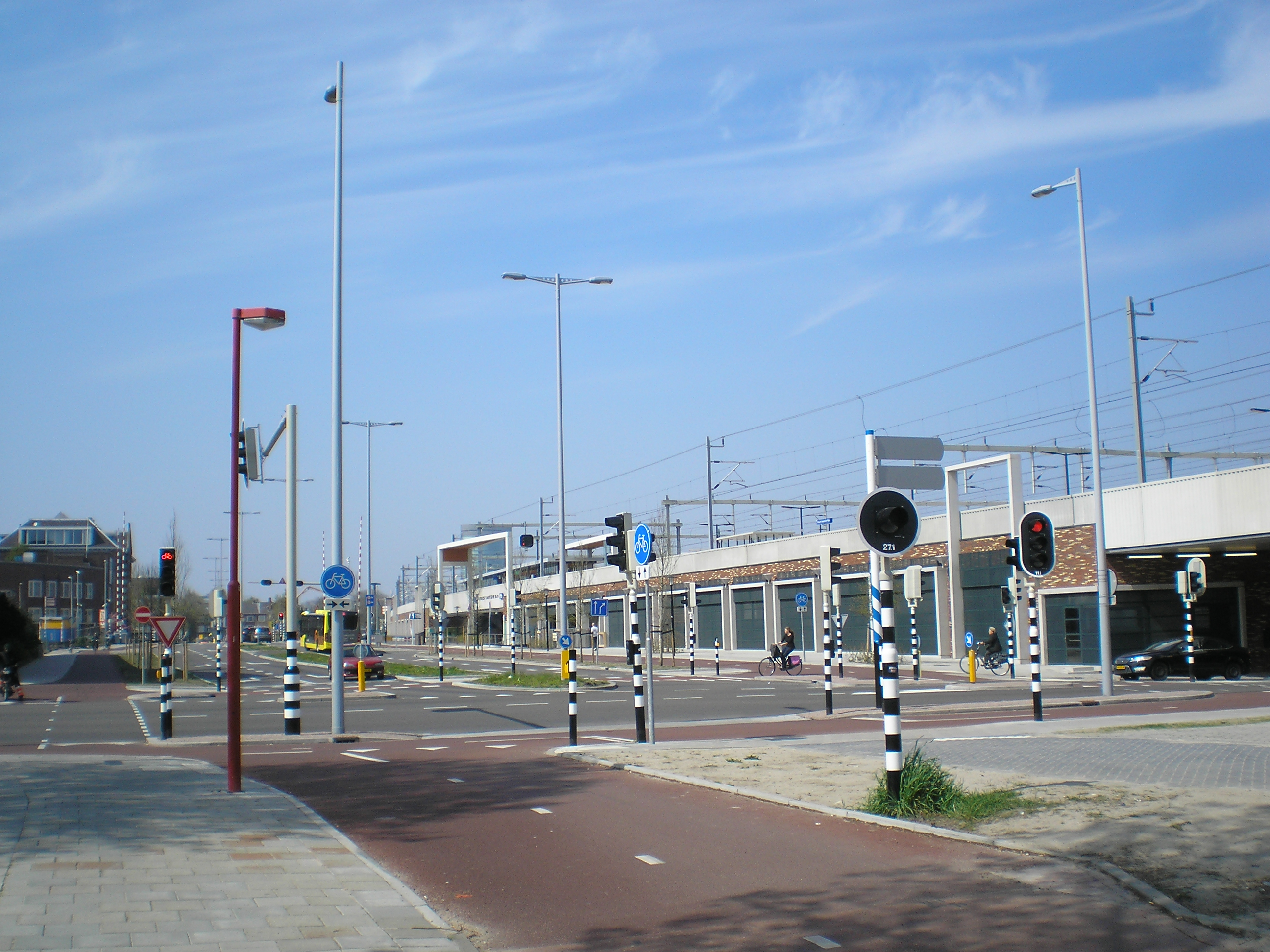
- Station Utrecht Vaartsche Rijn

General information
- Location: Utrecht Zuidzijde; Netherlands
- Coordinates: 52°04′43″N 5°07′21″E
- Lines: Amsterdam–Arnhem railway, Utrecht–Boxtel railway

History
- Opened: 23 August 2016

Services
Preceding station	Nederlandse Spoorwegen	Following station
Utrecht Centraal towards Den Haag Centraal	NS Sprinter 6000 After 18:00 and Fri-Sun	Utrecht Lunetten towards 's-Hertogenbosch
Utrecht Centraal towards Leiden Centraal	NS Sprinter 6700 After 18:00 and Fri-Sun	Utrecht Lunetten towards Tiel
Utrecht Centraal towards Den Haag Centraal	NS Sprinter 6900 Mon-Thur until 18:00	Utrecht Lunetten towards Tiel
Utrecht Centraal towards Breukelen	NS Sprinter 7300	Bunnik towards Rhenen
Utrecht Centraal towards Uitgeest	NS Sprinter 7400 Peak hours only	Bunnik towards Driebergen-Zeist
Utrecht Centraal towards Leiden Centraal	NS Sprinter 8800 Mon-Thur until 18:00	Utrecht Lunetten towards 's-Hertogenbosch
Location
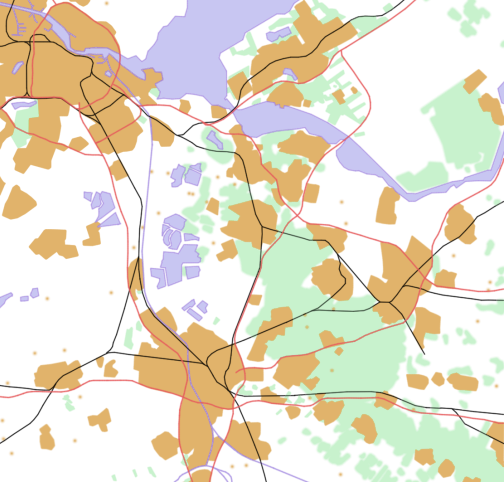
- Location within Northeastern Randstad

Vaartsche Rijn is a railway station in the Dutch city of Utrecht. It is situated on the railway lines between Utrecht and Arnhem and between Utrecht and 's-Hertogenbosch. Construction started in September 2010 and after some delays was officially opened at 23 August 2016. The station was built as part of ProRail's Randstadspoor project to improve suburban rail travel. Six to eight thousand riders are expected to use the station each day.

The station has 4 tracks with 2 island platforms, 3 underground pedestrian passages and space for 650 bicycles and 200 cars. The platforms can be reached by stairs or transparent lifts, and are sheltered with roofs made of wood. The station is built six meters above street level.

On 14 December 2019, line 22 (the Uithoflijn) of the Utrecht sneltram (light rail) system opened from Utrecht Centraal to the Uithof district with a stop at Vaartsche Rijn station. The stop has two side platforms.

== Gallery ==
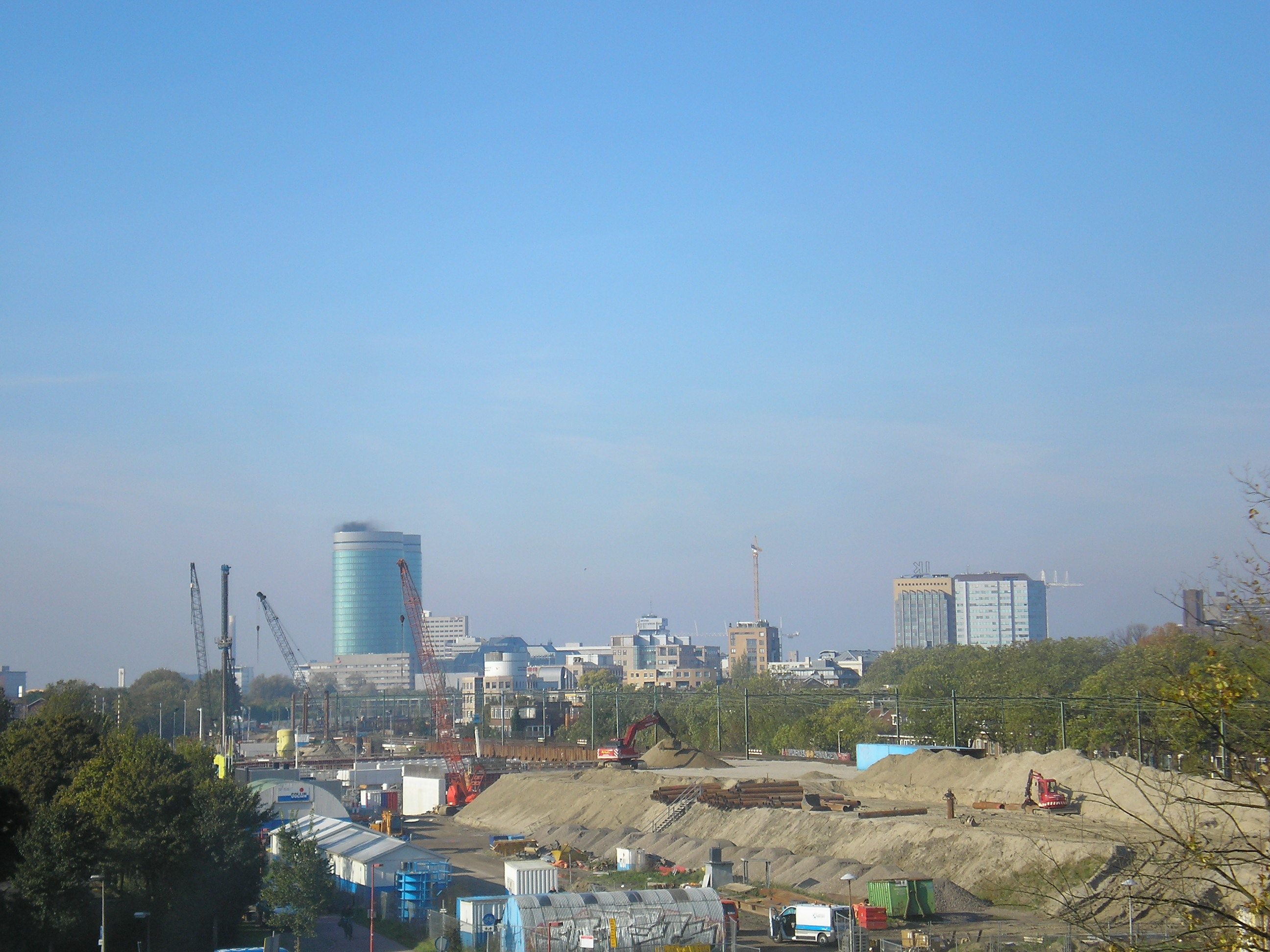
Utrecht station Vaartsche Rijn viewed from the Police station on Baden-Powellweg.

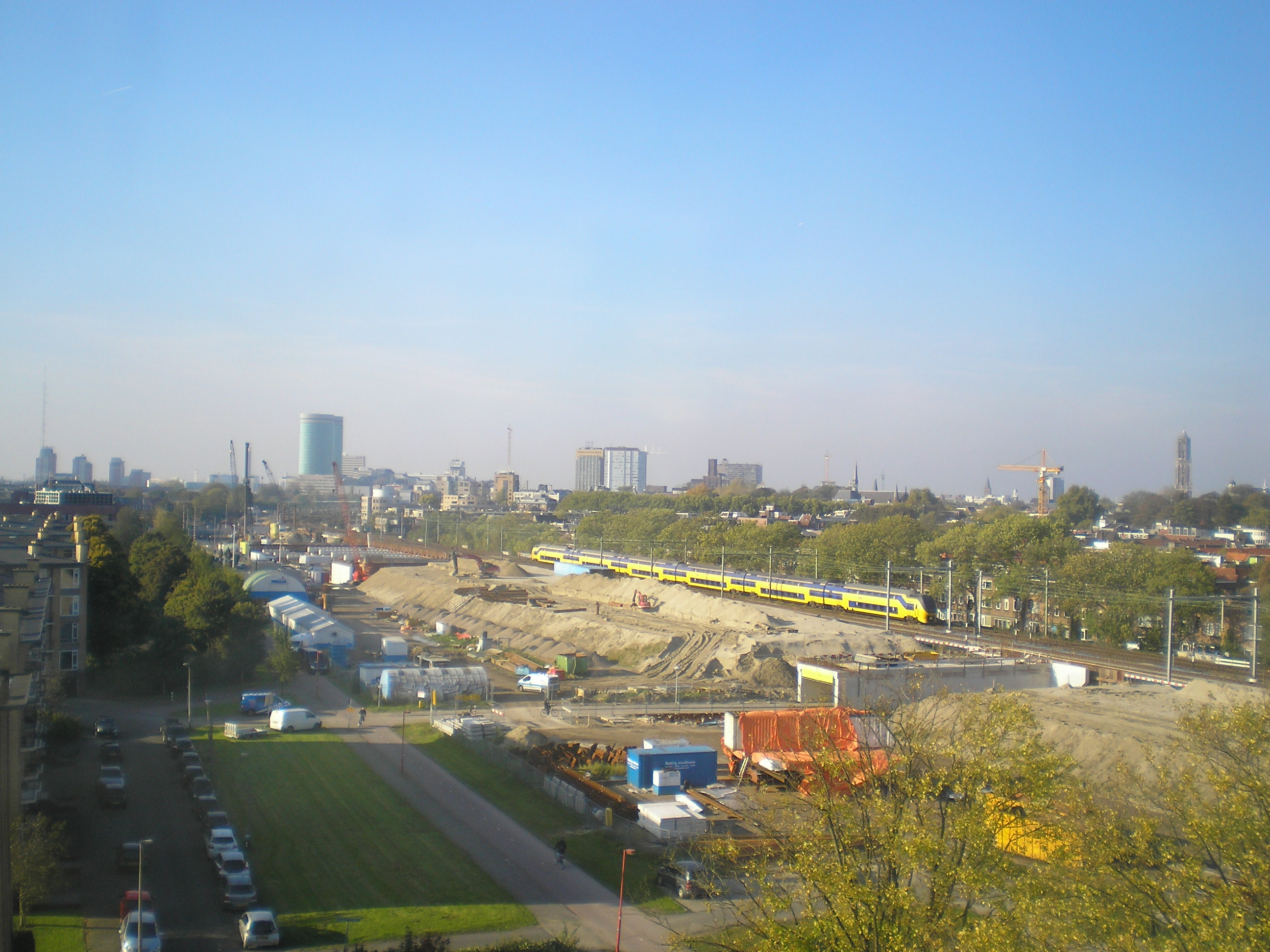
Construction of station Utrecht Vaartsche Rijn on the right, with the new bicycle and pedestrian tunnel leading to the Watervogelbuurt on the bottom right.
