= List of railway lines in the Netherlands =

Map of railway lines in the Netherlands, with number of tracks, maximum speeds and traffic type.

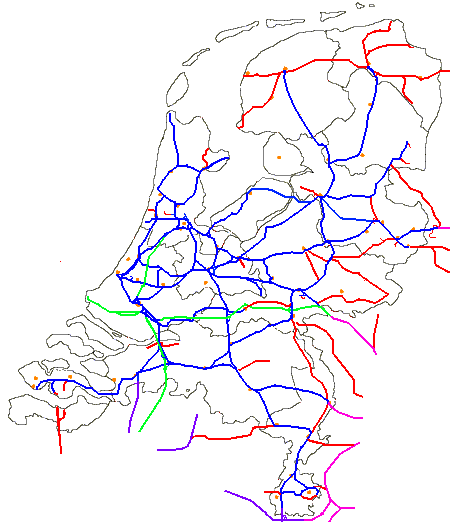
Electrification of the rail network: Electrified 1500 V DC Electrified 25 kV AC 50 Hz Electrified 3000 V DC (Belgium) Electrified 15 kV AC 16,7 Hz (Germany) Not Electrified

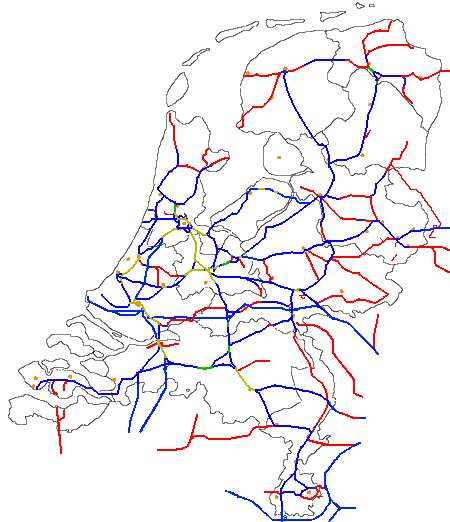
Number of tracks on a railway line: Single track Double track Three track Four track

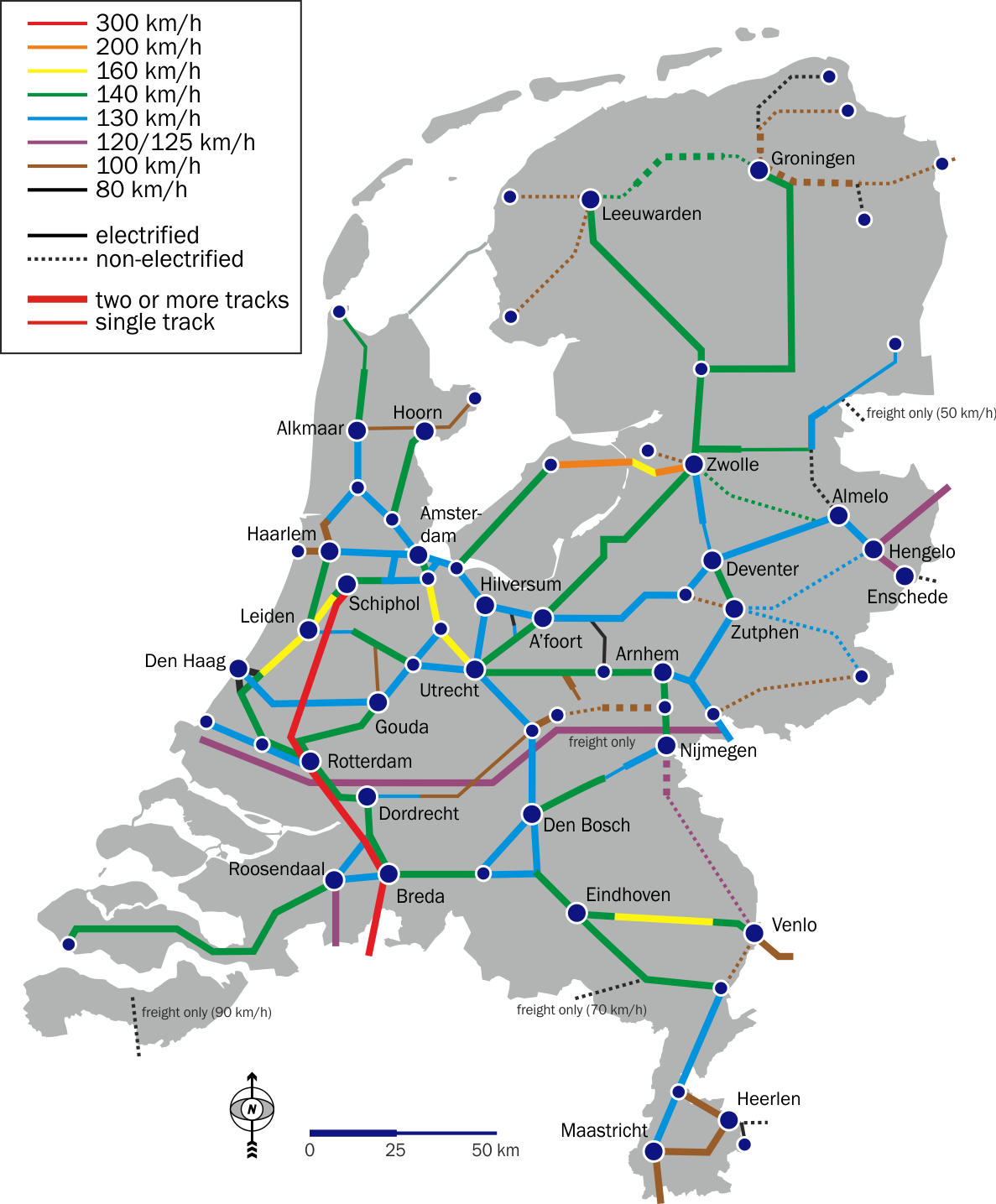
Maximum speeds on the rail network.

The Netherlands has a rail network totalling 7,021 kilometres (4,363 mi) of track, or 3,013 route km. Three quarters of it is electrified, one third is single track. Railway lines are built in standard gauge, apart from a few narrow gauge industrial and recreational railways.

== List of railway lines by province ==
In contrast with the motorways in the Netherlands, and the railway lines in Belgium, the railway lines in the Netherlands are not identified by line numbers. For that reason, the lines listed below are named simply by reference to the names of their termini.

=== Groningen ===
- Groningen–Delfzijl railway
- Harlingen–Nieuweschans railway
- Ihrhove–Nieuweschans railway
- Meppel–Groningen railway
- Sauwerd–Roodeschool railway
- Stadskanaal–Zuidbroek railway

=== Friesland ===
- Arnhem–Leeuwarden railway
- Harlingen–Nieuweschans railway
- Leeuwarden–Stavoren railway

=== Drenthe ===
- Arnhem–Leeuwarden railway
- Gronau–Coevorden railway
- Meppel–Groningen railway
- Zwolle–Emmen railway

=== Overijssel ===
- Almelo–Salzbergen (D) railway
- Apeldoorn–Deventer railway
- Arnhem–Leeuwarden railway
- Deventer–Almelo railway
- Doetinchem–Hengelo railway
- Lelystad–Zwolle railway (Hanzelijn)
- Mariënberg–Almelo railway
- Münster–Enschede railway
- Utrecht–Kampen railway
- Zutphen–Glanerbeek railway
- Zwolle–Almelo railway
- Zwolle–Emmen railway

=== Flevoland ===
- Lelystad–Zwolle railway (Hanzelijn)
- Weesp–Lelystad railway (Flevolijn)

=== Gelderland ===
- Amsterdam–Arnhem railway
- Amsterdam–Zutphen railway
- Apeldoorn–Deventer railway
- Arnhem–Nijmegen railway
- Arnhem–Leeuwarden railway
- Dieren–Apeldoorn railway
- Elst–Dordrecht railway
- Kesteren–Amersfoort railway
- Nijmegen–Kleve railway
- Nijkerk–Ede-Wageningen railway
- Nijmegen–Venlo railway
- Oberhausen–Arnhem railway
- Rotterdam–Zevenaar railway
- Tilburg–Nijmegen railway
- Utrecht–Boxtel railway
- Utrecht–Kampen railway
- Winterswijk–Zevenaar railway
- Zutphen–Glanerbeek railway

=== Utrecht ===
- Amsterdam–Arnhem railway
- Amsterdam–Zutphen railway
- Den Dolder–Baarn railway
- De Haar–Rhenen railway
- Harmelen–Breukelen railway
- Hilversum–Lunetten railway
- Kesteren–Amersfoort railway
- Utrecht–Boxtel railway
- Utrecht–Rotterdam railway
- Utrecht–Kampen railway
- Woerden–Leiden railway

=== North Holland ===
- Aalsmeer–Amsterdam Willemspark railway
- Amsterdam–Zutphen railway
- Amsterdam–Arnhem railway
- Amsterdam–Haarlem–Rotterdam railway
- Amsterdam–Schiphol railway
- Haarlem–Uitgeest railway
- Haarlem–Zandvoort railway
- Heerhugowaard–Hoorn railway
- Hilversum–Lunetten railway
- Hoorn–Medemblik railway
- Den Helder–Amsterdam railway
- HSL-Zuid
- Santpoort Noord–IJmuiden railway
- Weesp–Leiden railway
- Weesp–Lelystad railway (Flevolijn)
- Zaandam–Enkhuizen railway

=== South Holland ===
- Amsterdam–Haarlem–Rotterdam railway
- Breda–Rotterdam railway
- Elst–Dordrecht railway
- Gouda–Alphen aan den Rijn railway
- Gouda–Den Haag railway
- HSL-Zuid
- Rotterdam–Zevenaar railway
- Schiedam–Hoek van Holland railway
- Utrecht–Rotterdam railway
- Weesp–Leiden railway
- Woerden–Leiden railway
- Havenspoorlijn

=== Zeeland ===
- Gent–Terneuzen railway
- Lewedorp–Vlissingen Sloehaven railway
- Mechelen–Terneuzen railway
- Roosendaal–Vlissingen railway

=== North Brabant ===
- Antwerp–Lage Zwaluwe railway
- Boxtel–Büderich railway
- Breda–Eindhoven railway
- Breda–Rotterdam railway
- Eindhoven–Weert railway
- HSL-Zuid
- Nijmegen–Venlo railway
- Roosendaal–Breda railway
- Roosendaal–Vlissingen railway
- Tilburg–Nijmegen railway
- Utrecht–Boxtel railway
- Venlo–Eindhoven railway

=== Limburg ===
- Eindhoven–Weert railway
- Heerlen–Schin op Geul railway
- Liège–Maastricht railway
- Maastricht–Hasselt railway
- Maastricht–Aachen railway
- Maastricht–Venlo railway
- Nijmegen–Venlo railway
- Schaesberg–Simpelveld railway
- Sittard–Herzogenrath railway
- Venlo–Eindhoven railway
- Viersen–Venlo railway
- Weert–Roermond railway

== Stretches with four tracks ==
- 5 Schiphol – Hoofddorp
- 5, 7 Leiden – Rijswijk
- 7 Schiedam – Dordrecht
- 13, 20 Amsterdam Centraal – Amsterdam Muiderpoort
- 13 Amsterdam Bijlmer Arena – Utrecht Centraal
- 9, 12 Boxtel – Eindhoven
- 15, 16, 19 Utrecht Centraal – Utrecht Overvecht
- 18 Utrecht – Woerden
- 18 Gouda – Gouda Goverwelle

== Former railways ==
The railways in the following list have been closed and demolished:

- Aalsmeer–Haarlem railway
- Aalsmeer–Nieuwersluis-Loenen railway
- Apeldoorn–Zwolle railway
- Assen–Stadskanaal railway
- Boekelo–Oldenzaal railway
- Bovenkerk–Uithoorn railway
- De Bilt–Zeist railway
- Deventer–Ommen railway
- Enschede–Ahaus railway
- Glanerbrug–Losser railway
- Groningen–Weiwerd railway
- Haltern–Venlo railway
- Hattem–Kampen Zuid railway
- Hoofddorp–Leiden Heerensingel railway
- Leeuwarden–Anjum railway
- Neede–Hellendoorn railway
- St. Pancras–Broek op Langedijk railway
- Stiens–Harlingen railway
- Tzummarum–Franeker railway
- Uithoorn–Alphen aan den Rijn railway
- Varsseveld–Dinxperlo railway
- Winsum–Zoutkamp railway
- Winterswijk–Neede railway
- Zevenaar–Kleve railway
- Zuidbroek–Delfzijl railway

== History ==
Railway map 1904:

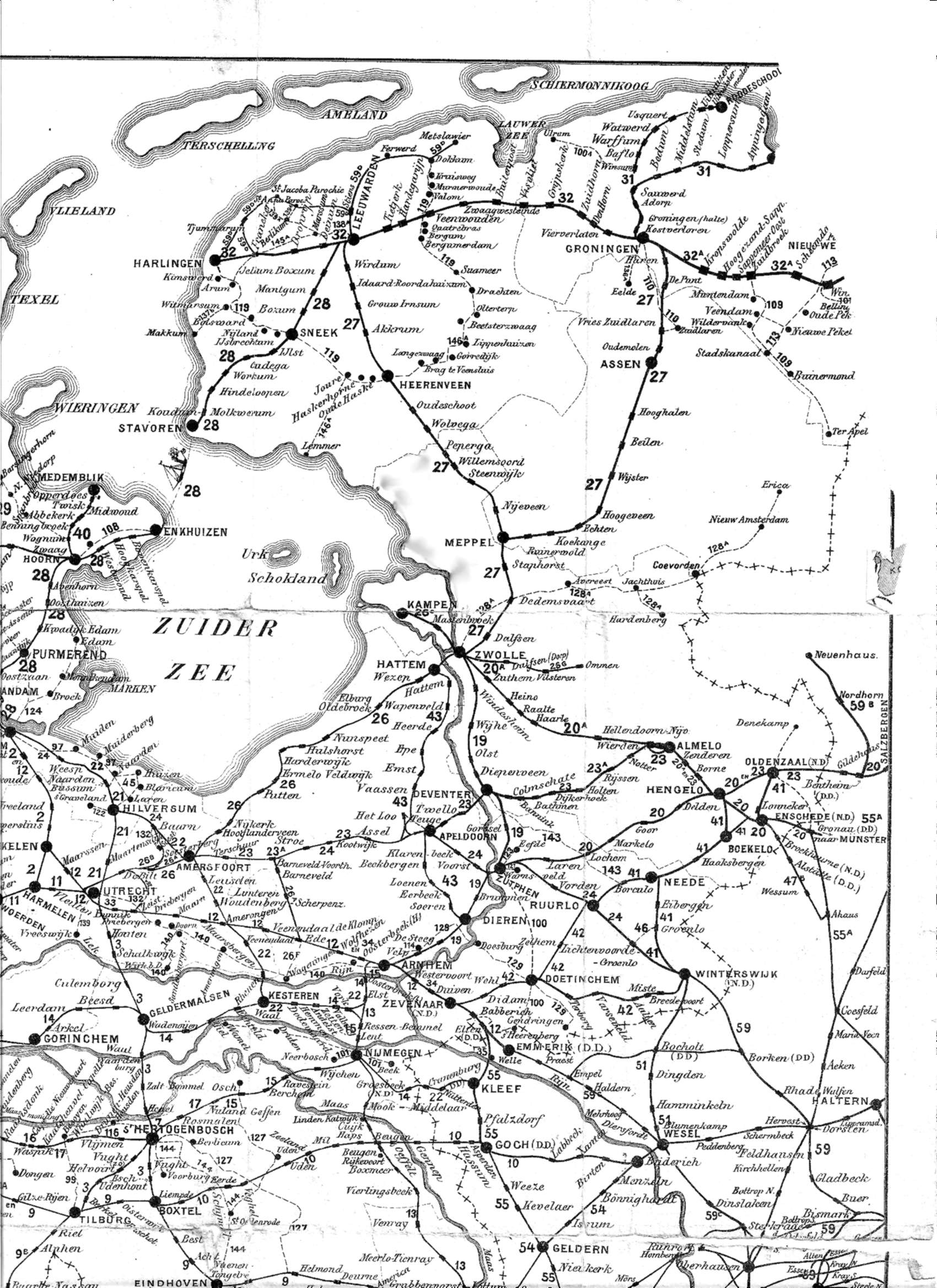

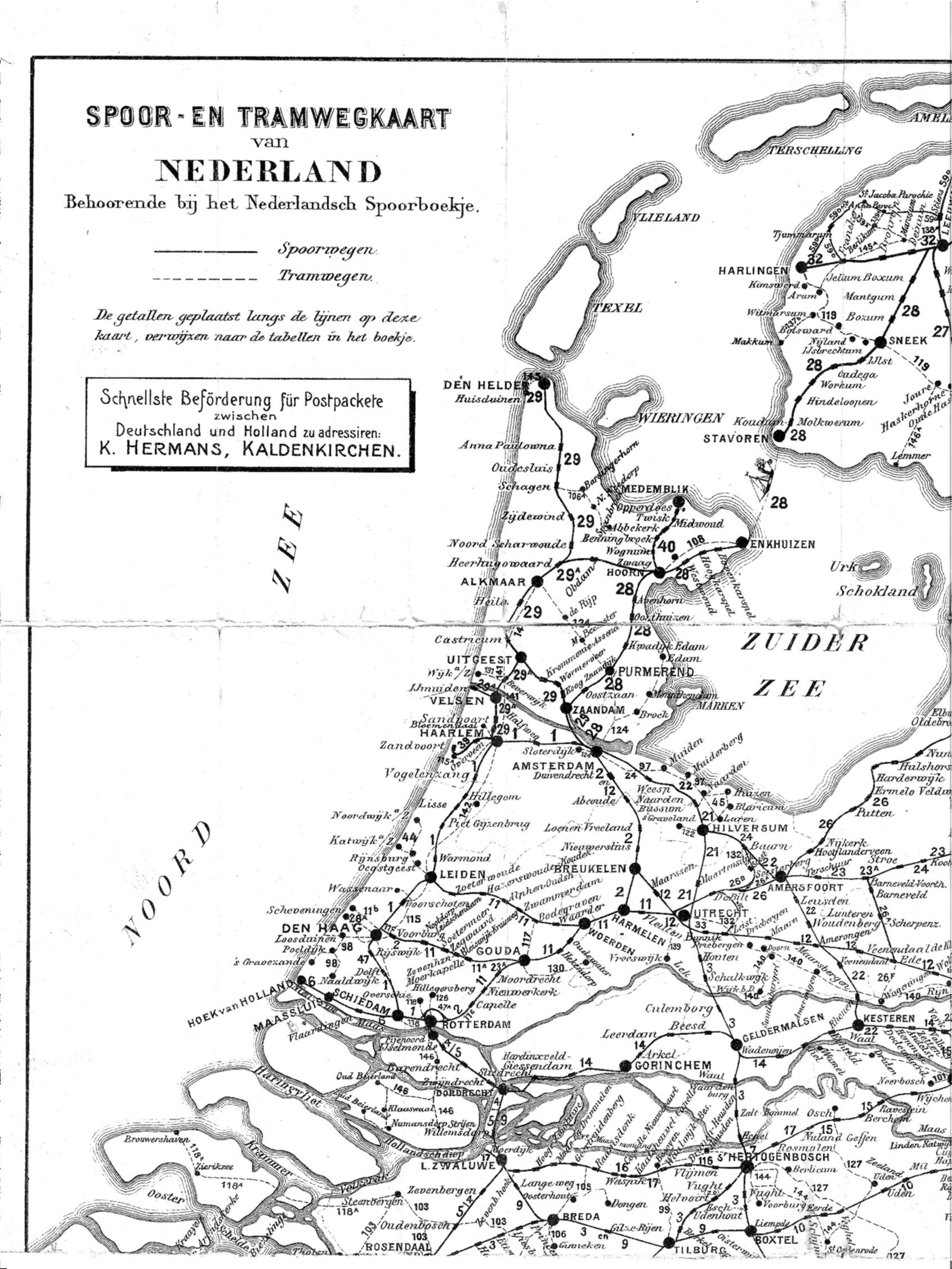

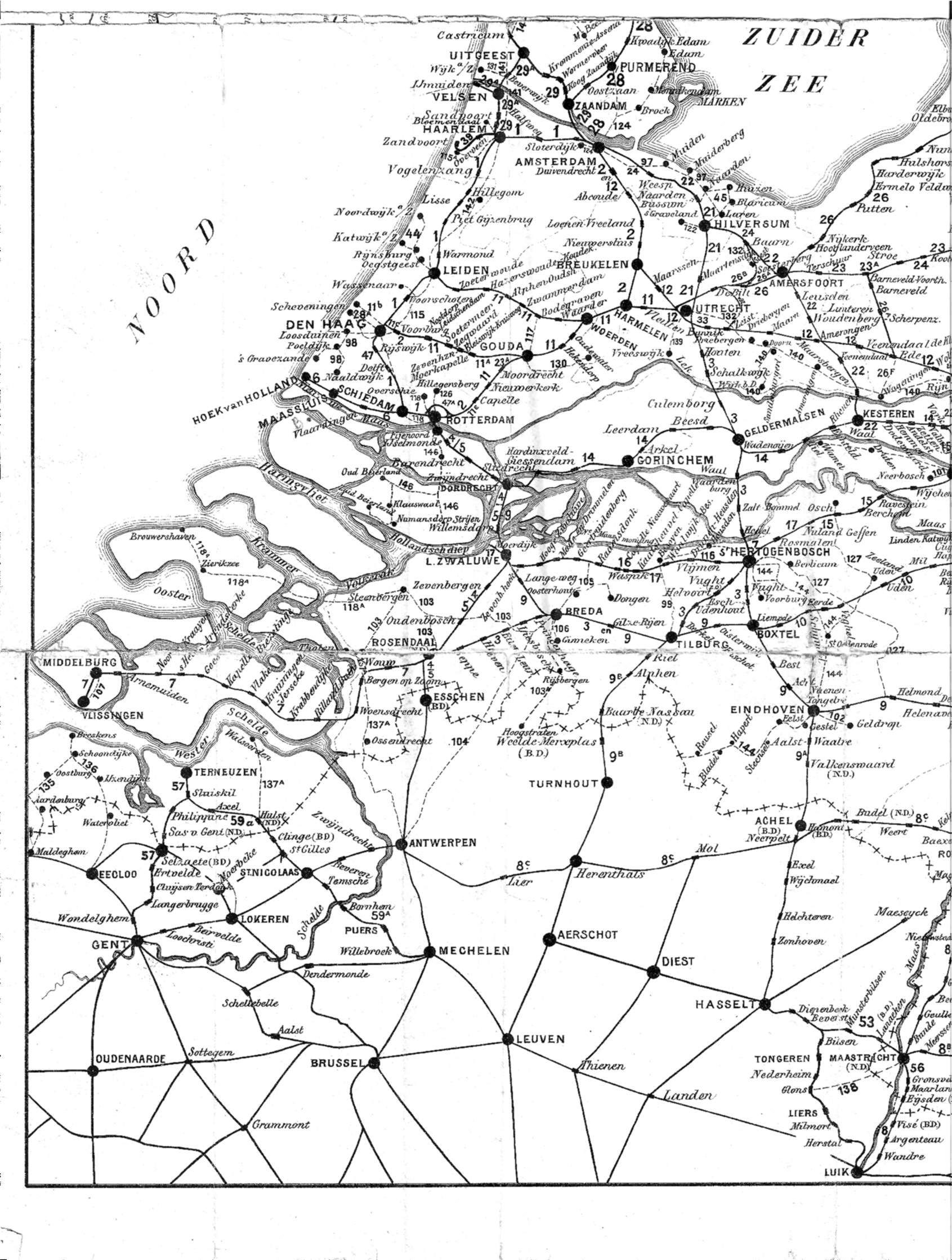

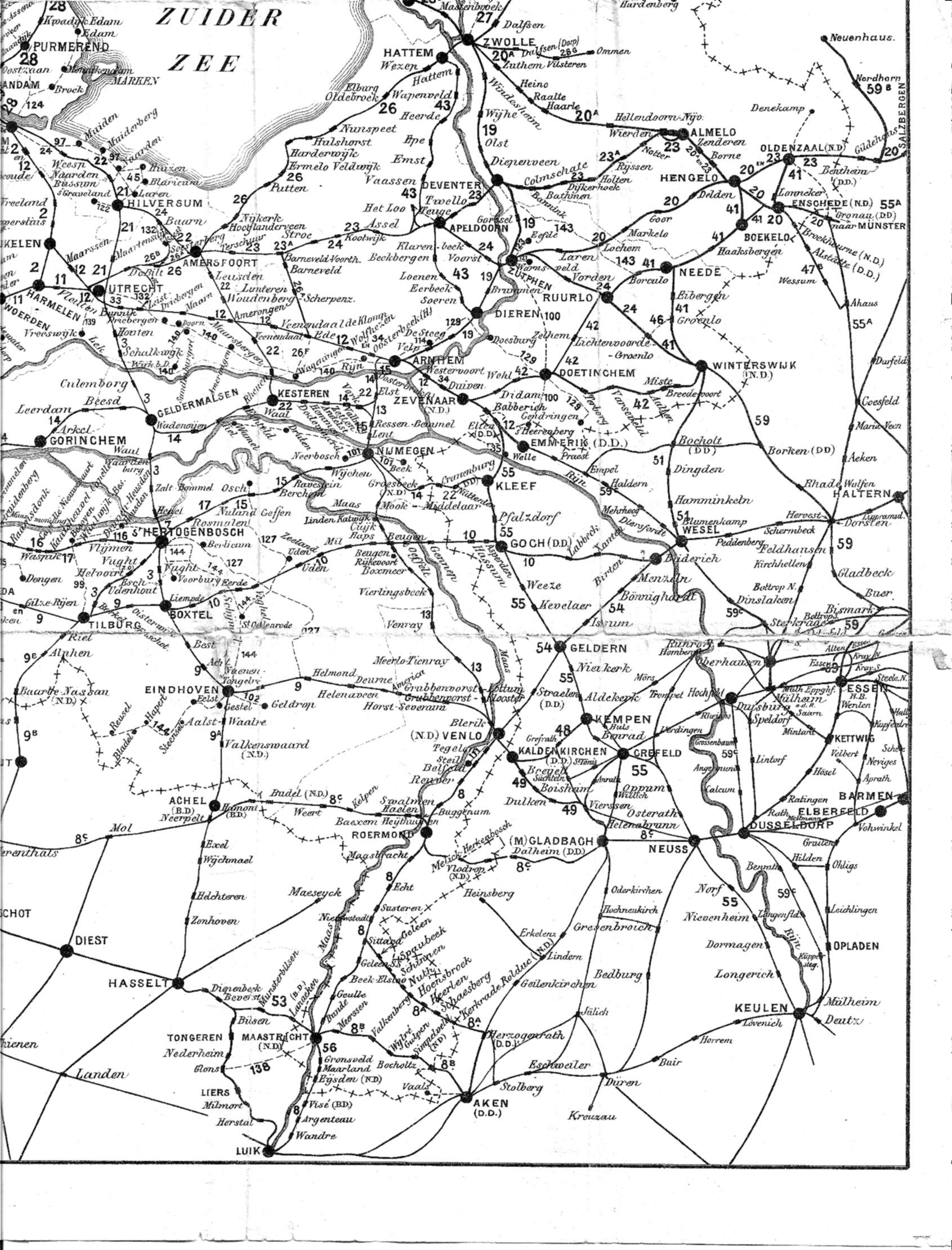
