= Willem van Manen (politician) =

Dutch tailor and politician (1875–1963)

Member of the House of Representatives
- In office 16 September 1909 – 21 September 1909
- Preceded by: Schelto van Citters
- Succeeded by: Gerrit Johan Anne Schimmelpenninck
- Constituency: Ede

Personal details
- Born: Willem van Manen Janszoon; 3 December 1875 Gelders Veenendaal, Netherlands
- Died: 31 August 1963 (aged 87) Stichts Veenendaal, Netherlands
- Party: ARP (until 1909)
- Spouse: Elisabeth van Ginkel

Willem van Manen Jzn. (3 December 1875 – 31 August 1963) was a Dutch tailor and politician. Nominated as the only candidate during a 1909 by-election in the Ede electoral district, Van Manen served as a member of the Dutch House of Representatives for five days between 16 September and 21 September 1909 as an independent.

== Biography ==
Willem van Manen Jzn. was born on 3 December 1875 in Veenendaal, then a part of the municipality of Ede to Jan van Manen, a tailor, and Petronella van de Goor. Van Manen worked as a tailor in Ede.

On 9 July 1909, Schelto van Citters, a member of the House of Representatives representing the Ede electoral district for the ARP, resigned to become Queen's Commissioner of Gelderland. As there would only be a single session of the House of Representatives until the parliament elected in the 1909 Dutch general election would be inaugurated in September, the major parties decided not to nominate any candidates to avoid a costly by-election. A group of mostly factory workers from Ede nevertheless decided to nominate Van Manen as a candidate, likely as a joke, and as the only candidate running Van Manen was declared elected in the subsequent by-election. Due to his modest economic position, Van Maenen was ineligible to vote at the time of his election.

In an interview with a journalist from the Algemeen Handelsblad, Van Manen had not played any role in his nomination, seeing his position largely as a means of obtaining more money to buy fabrics with. He declared he did not belong to any political party, having previously been aligned with the Anti-Revolutionary Party (ARP) but no longer supported the partg because the ARP had "failed to do anything for the little guy." Van Manen also stated he intended to attend his first parliamentary session in The Hague on 16 September 1909.

When Van Manen did attend the session of the House of Representatives that day, the prospect of seeing such a short-lived MP led to the public galleries being filled up completely with spectators. The House of Representatives had gathered at the behest of the Social Democratic Workers' Party (SDAP) group, of which Henri van Kol had submitted a legislative proposal regarding mining concessions in the Dutch East Indies. Van Manen was one of two right-wing MPs to vote in favor of beginning debate on the law, which expired after Van Kol left the House that year.

As Van Manen was not re-elected, he left the House of Representatives on 21 September 1909, his five-day tenure making him the shortest serving Dutch MP to date.

Willem van Manen died on 31 August 1963 in Veenendaal.

== Personal life ==
Van Manen was married to Elisabeth van Ginkel. He belonged to the Reformed Churches in the Netherlands.
