= Bunnik railway station =

Railway station in the Netherlands

Bunnik
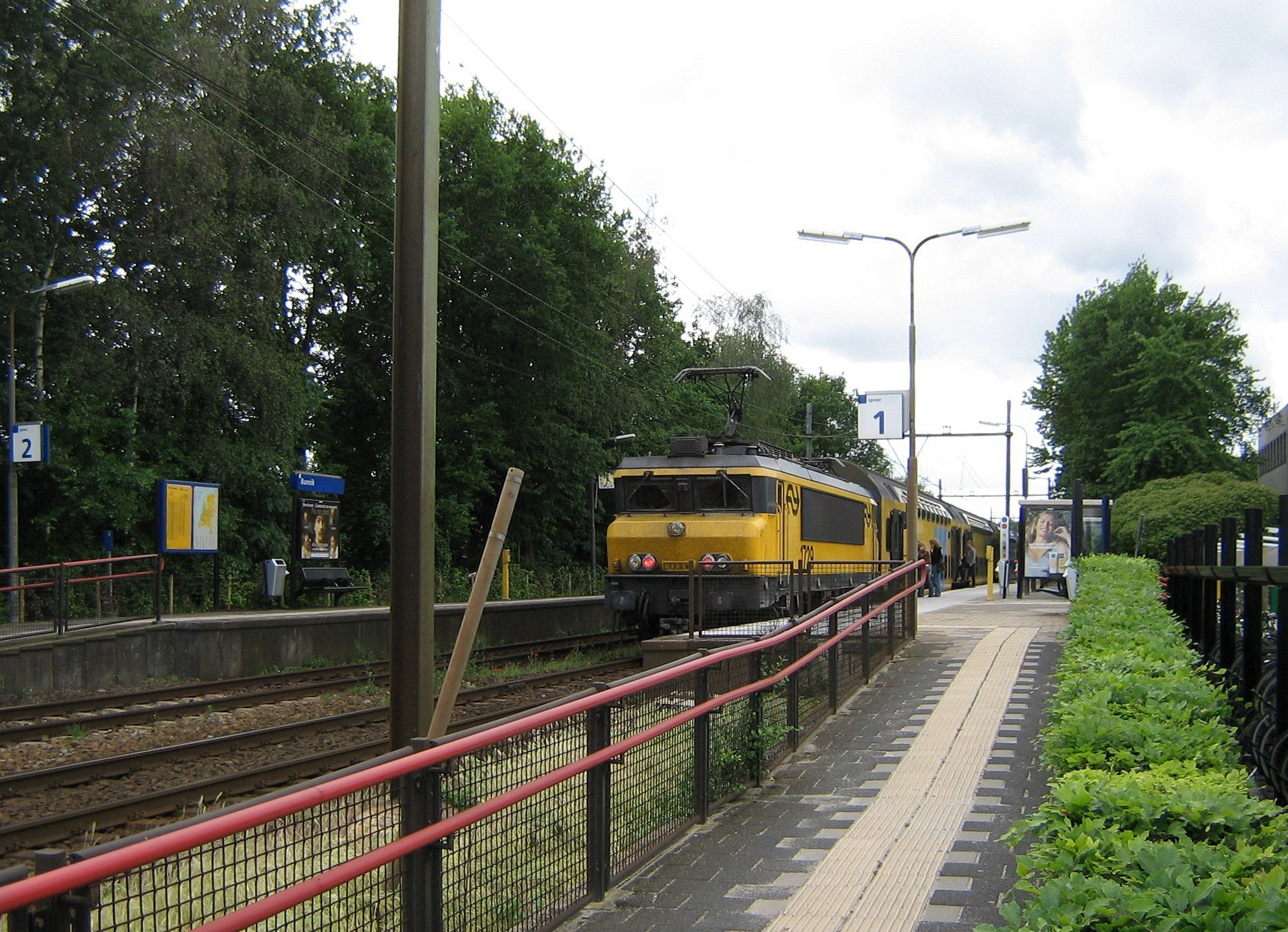

General information
- Location: Netherlands
- Coordinates: 52°03′47″N 5°11′44″E
- Line: Amsterdam–Arnhem railway

Services
Preceding station	Nederlandse Spoorwegen	Following station
Utrecht Vaartsche Rijn towards Breukelen	NS Sprinter 7300	Driebergen-Zeist towards Rhenen
Utrecht Vaartsche Rijn towards Uitgeest	NS Sprinter 7400 Peak hours only	Driebergen-Zeist Terminus
Location
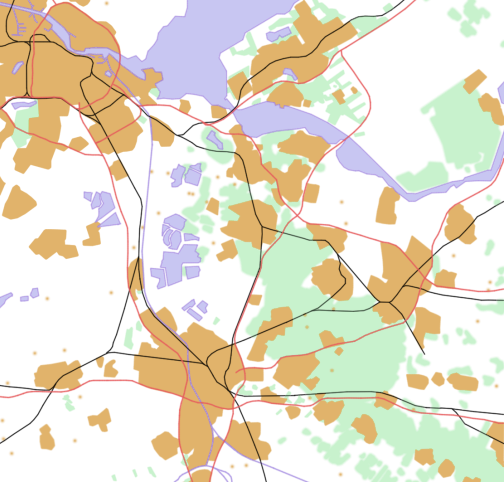
- Location within Northeastern Randstad

Bunnik is a railway station located in Bunnik, Netherlands operated by Nederlandse Spoorwegen. The station is located on the Amsterdam–Arnhem railway. It was opened in 1868 and closed between 15 May 1938 and 28 May 1972. The current location is about 1 km further west than the original station.

== Train service ==
The following services currently call at Bunnik:

- 2× per hour local service (sprinter) Amsterdam–Utrecht–Rhenen
- 2× per hour local service (sprinter) Breukelen–Utrecht–Veenendaal Centrum

== Platforms ==
- Platform 1 – Utrecht, Breukelen
- Platform 2 – Veenendaal, Rhenen
