= Utrecht Lunetten railway station =

Railway station in the Netherlands

Utrecht Lunetten
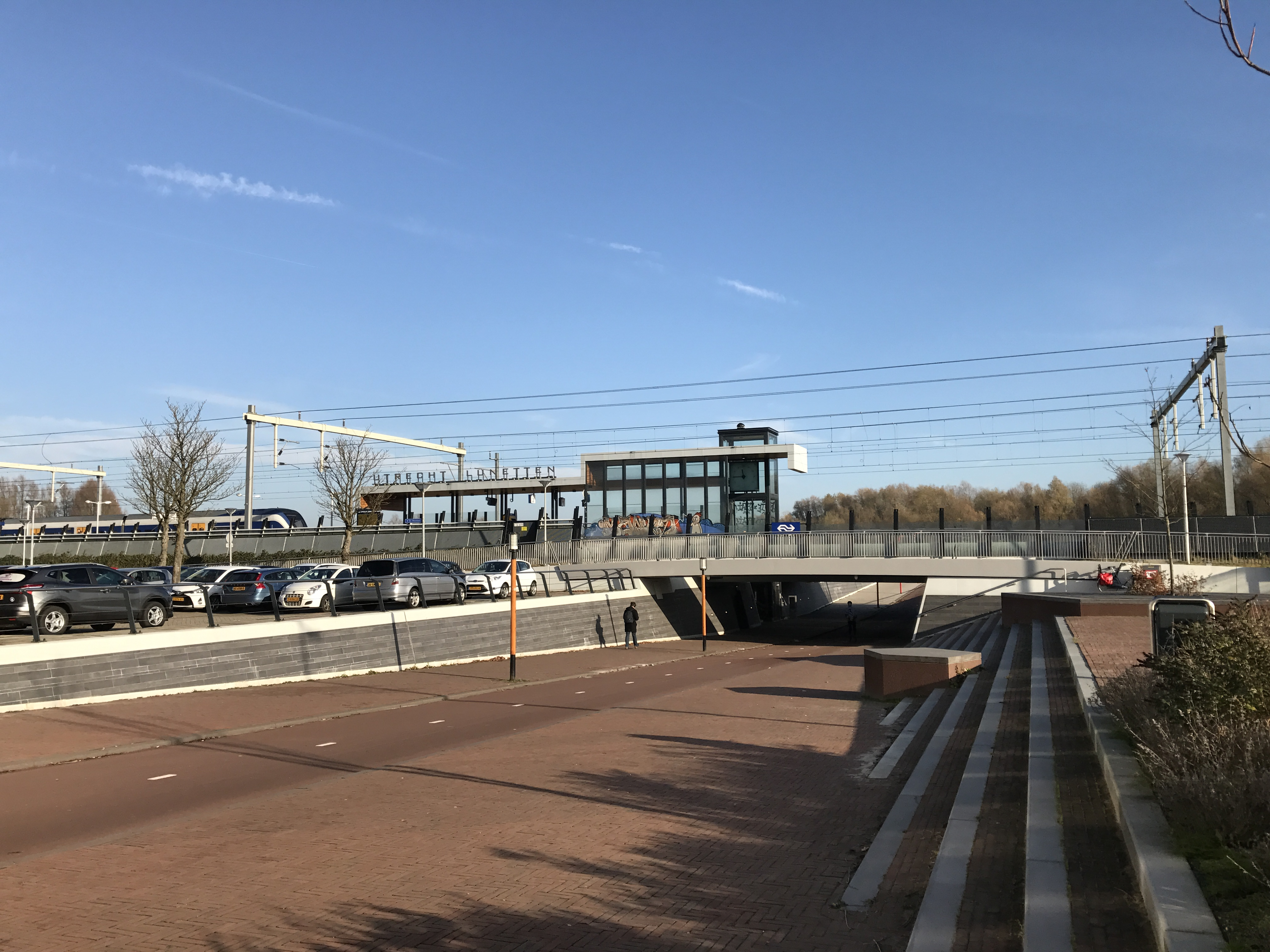

General information
- Location: Netherlands
- Coordinates: 52°03′57″N 5°08′32″E
- Lines: Utrecht–Boxtel railway, Hilversum–Lunetten railway

History
- Opened: 10 June 1874 (old), 25 September 1980 (new)
- Closed: 15 May 1932 (old)

Services
Preceding station	Nederlandse Spoorwegen	Following station
Utrecht Vaartsche Rijn towards Den Haag Centraal	NS Sprinter 6000 After 18:00 and Fri-Sun	Houten towards 's-Hertogenbosch
Utrecht Vaartsche Rijn towards Leiden Centraal	NS Sprinter 6700 After 18:00 and Fri-Sun	Houten towards Tiel
Utrecht Vaartsche Rijn towards Den Haag Centraal	NS Sprinter 6900 Mon-Thur until 18:00	Houten towards Tiel
Utrecht Vaartsche Rijn towards Leiden Centraal	NS Sprinter 8800 Mon-Thur until 18:00	Houten towards 's-Hertogenbosch
Location
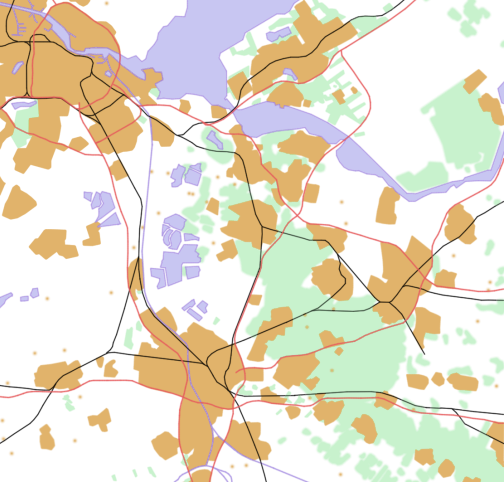
- Location within Northeastern Randstad

Utrecht Lunetten is a railway station located in Utrecht, Netherlands. The station originally opened on 10 June 1874 and is located on the Utrecht–Boxtel railway and the Hilversum–Lunetten railway (via Utrecht Maliebaan). The station closed on 15 May 1932. The station was re-opened on 25 September 1980. The services are currently operated by Nederlandse Spoorwegen.

When new the station was just an interchange station between the Utrecht - 's-Hertogenbosch line and the Hilversum - Utrecht Lunetten services. There was no entrance/exit to the station, so its sole purpose was for the interchange of these lines.

== Train services ==
The following services currently call at Utrecht Lunetten:

- 2x per hour local service (sprinter) Woerden - Utrecht - Geldermalsen - Tiel
- 2x per hour local service (sprinter) The Hague - Utrecht - Geldermalsen - 's-Hertogenbosch

The railway tracks were doubled in order to separate local from Intercity services.

== Bus services ==
- 8 - Utrecht Lunetten - Tolsteeg - Centraal Station - Centrum - Sterrenwijk
- 10 - Utrecht Lunetten - Kanaleneiland - Oudenrijn - Leidsche Rijn
- 15 - Utrecht Lunetten - Tolsteeg - Hoograven (during evenings and Weekends)
