= Veenendaal Centrum railway station =

Railway station in Veenendaal, the Netherlands

Veenendaal Centrum
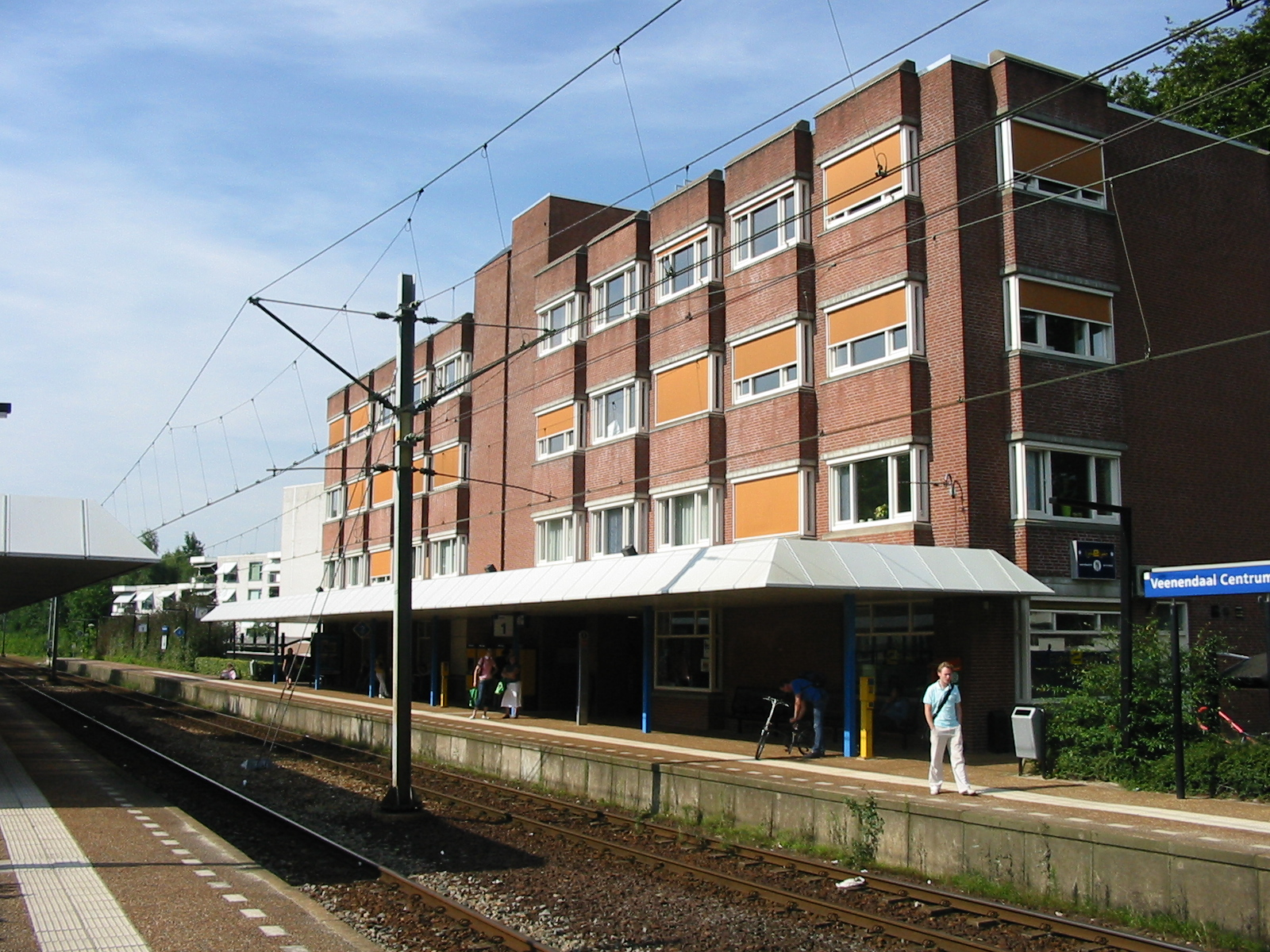

General information
- Location: Netherlands
- Coordinates: 52°01′12″N 5°32′57″E
- Line: Kesteren–Amersfoort railway

History
- Opened: 1886; 140 years ago, 1981; 45 years ago (reopened)
- Closed: 1944; 82 years ago

Services
Preceding station	Nederlandse Spoorwegen	Following station
Veenendaal West towards Breukelen	NS Sprinter 7300	Rhenen Terminus
Location
- Location within Netherlands

Veenendaal Centrum is a railway station located in Veenendaal, Netherlands. The station was opened in 1886, closed in 1944 and reopened in 1981. It is located on the Kesteren–Amersfoort railway. The train services are operated by Nederlandse Spoorwegen.

== Train services ==
The following services currently call at Veenendaal Centrum:

- 2x per hour local service (sprinter) Breukelen - Utrecht - Rhenen

== Bus services ==
Bus services are provided by Syntus Utrecht and Syntus Gelderland.

- Line 50 Utrecht Centraal Station - Station Veenendaal de Klomp (2x per hour)
- Line X80 Amersfoort Centraal Station - Rhenen Ouwehands Dierenpark (2x per hour)
- Line 280(Expressline) Amersfoort Centraal Station - Station Veenendaal Centrum (Between 07.00 and 10.00 and 15.00–19.00 2x per hour Monday till Friday only)
- Line 83 Station Veenendaal de Klomp - Veenendaal Centrum - Veenendaal west (2x per hour)
- Line 85 Station Ede Wageningen - Veenendaal Centrum (2x per hour off peak and 4x per hour on peak hours)
- Line 383 Station Veenendaal centrum - Woudenberg Henschotermeer (2x per hour “summer bus” only drives in the summer vacation)
- Schoolbus 380 Station Rhenen - Amersfoort Hoornbeeck/van Lodestein College (1x per day Monday till Friday only)
- Schoolbus 383 Station Rhenen - Hoevelaken Hoornbeeck/van Lodestein College (1x per day Monday till Friday only)
- Buurtbus 505 Overberg - Wekerom (1x per hour no service on Sundays)
