= Hilversum–Lunetten railway =

Railway line in the Netherlands

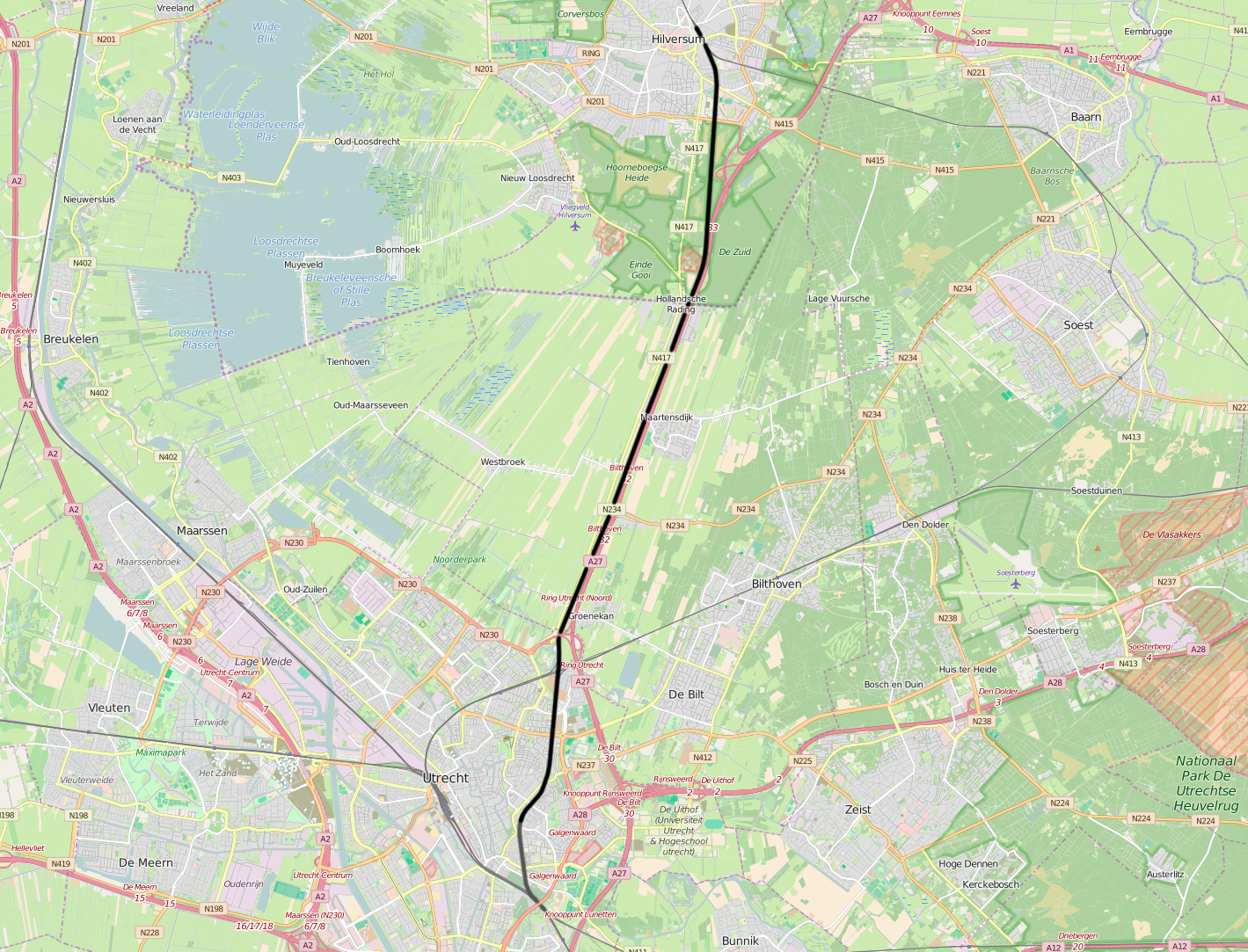
Hilversum–Lunetten railway map, the most southern part (grey) nowadays being a bicycle path and the part below the Utrecht–Kampen railway not being used for commercial traffic anymore

The Hilversum–Lunetten railway is a railway in the Netherlands opened in 1874 and running from Hilversum station to Utrecht Centraal. Trains of the Hollandsche IJzeren Spoorweg-Maatschappij were initially running from Hilversum to Utrecht Lunetten, also serving Utrecht Biltstraat (demolished in 1961) and Utrecht Maliebaan; since 1939, all trains coming from Hilversum are going to Utrecht Centraal via a connection with the Utrecht–Kampen railway. It connects the Amsterdam–Zutphen with the Amsterdam–Arnhem railway.

The railway was electrified between 1941 and 1942. Utrecht Maliebaan became the national railway museum in 1954 and the Maliebaan–Lunetten part of the railway became a bicycle path in 2017. Lunetten station is still in use, however nowadays being located further south on the Utrecht–Boxtel railway.
