= Rhenen railway station =

Railway station in the Netherlands

Rhenen
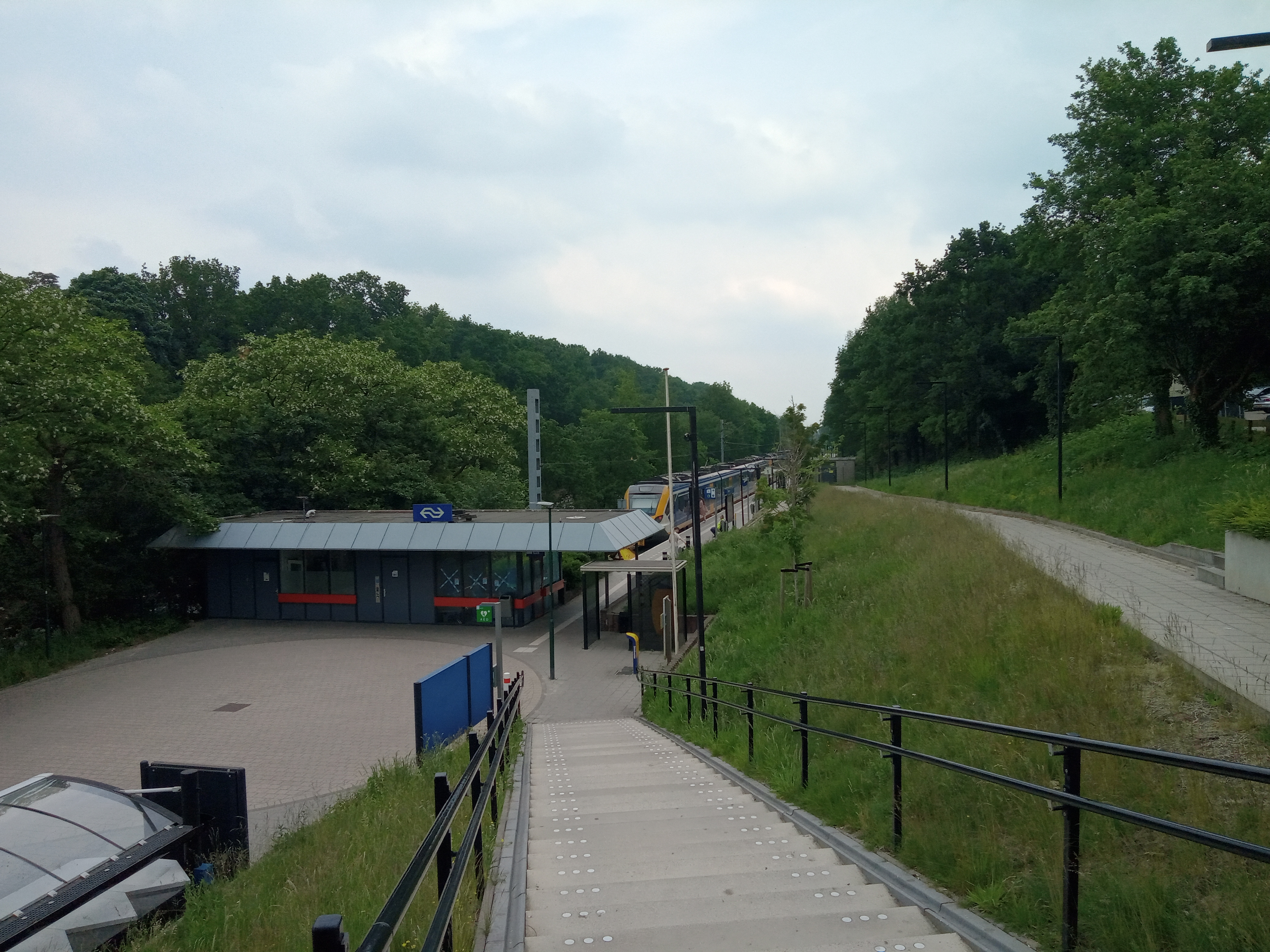

General information
- Location: Netherlands
- Coordinates: 51°57′28″N 5°34′42″E
- Line: Kesteren–Amersfoort railway

History
- Opened: 18 February 1886 (old), 31 May 1981 (new)
- Closed: 17 September 1944

Services
Preceding station	Nederlandse Spoorwegen	Following station
Veenendaal Centrum towards Breukelen	NS Sprinter 7300	Terminus
Location
- Location within Netherlands

Rhenen is a railway station located in Rhenen, Netherlands. The station was opened on 18 February 1886 and is located on the Kesteren–Amersfoort railway (Maarn - Rhenen). The services are currently operated by Nederlandse Spoorwegen. The station closed on 17 September 1944 and reopened on 31 May 1981. There is a single terminating platform.

== Train services ==
The following services currently call at Rhenen:

- 2x per hour local service (sprinter) Breukelen - Utrecht - Rhenen

== Bus services ==
- 44
- 45
- 50
- 80
- 680
- 683
- 690

== Images ==
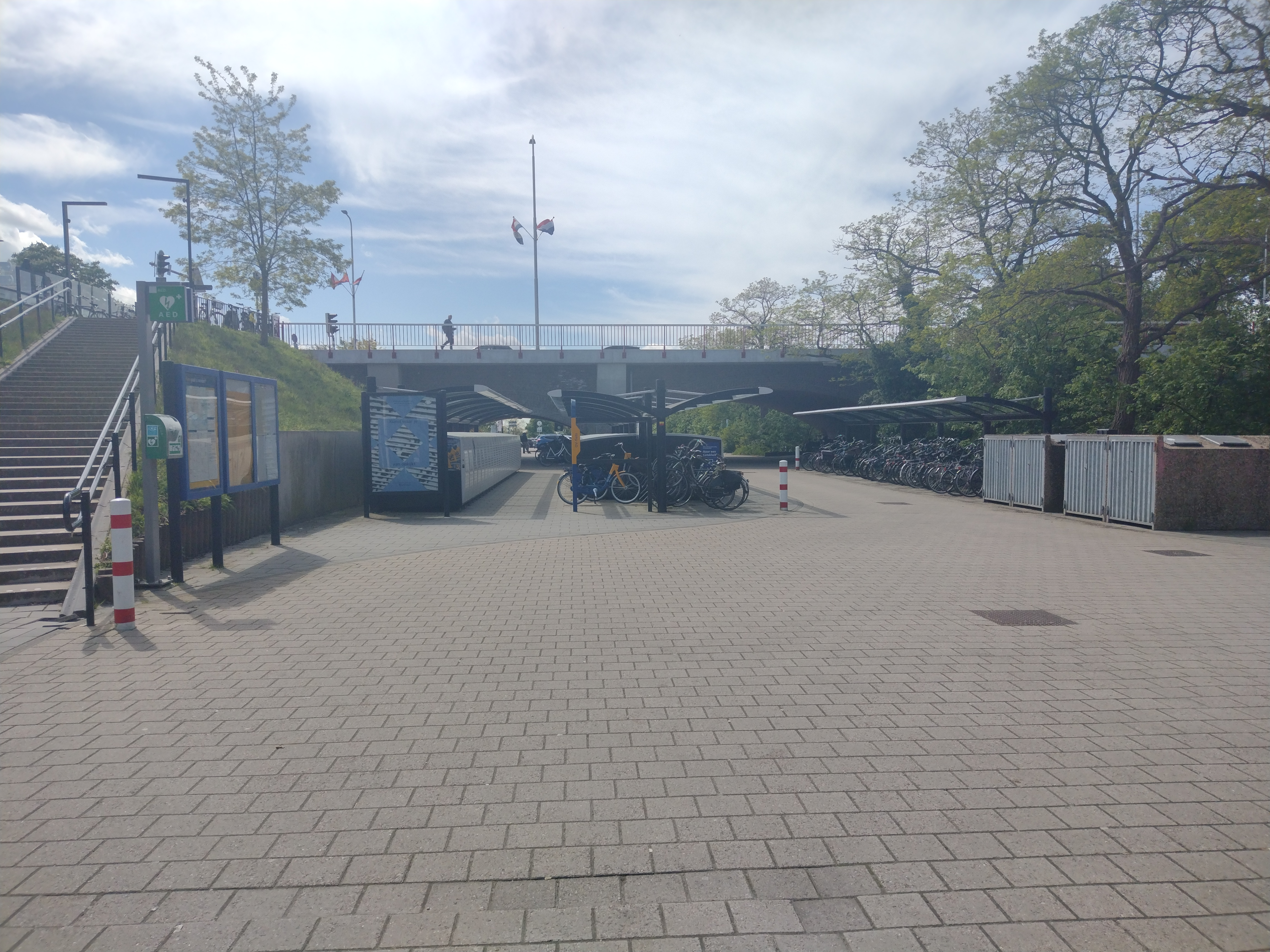
Bicycle parking

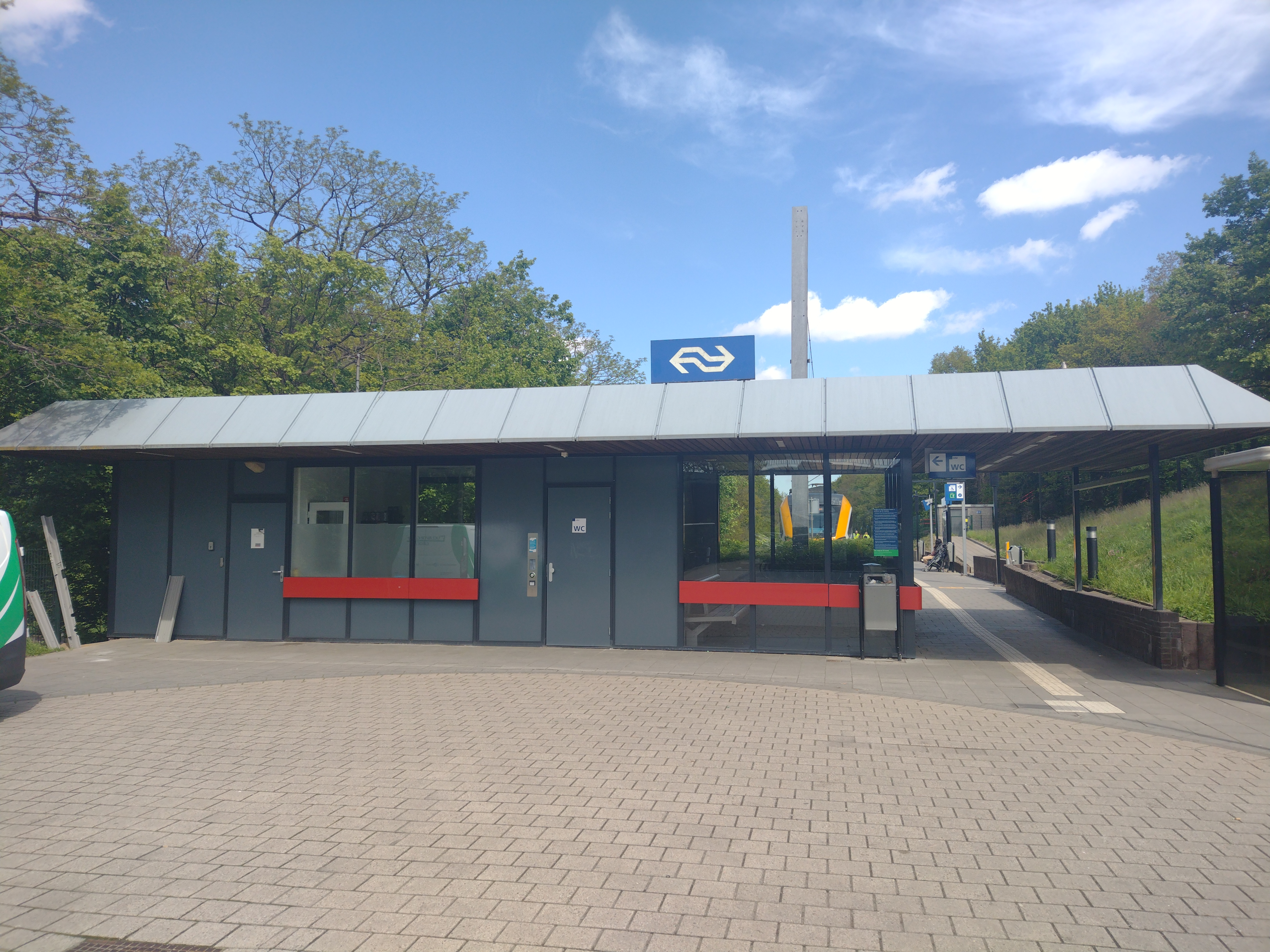
Front of the station

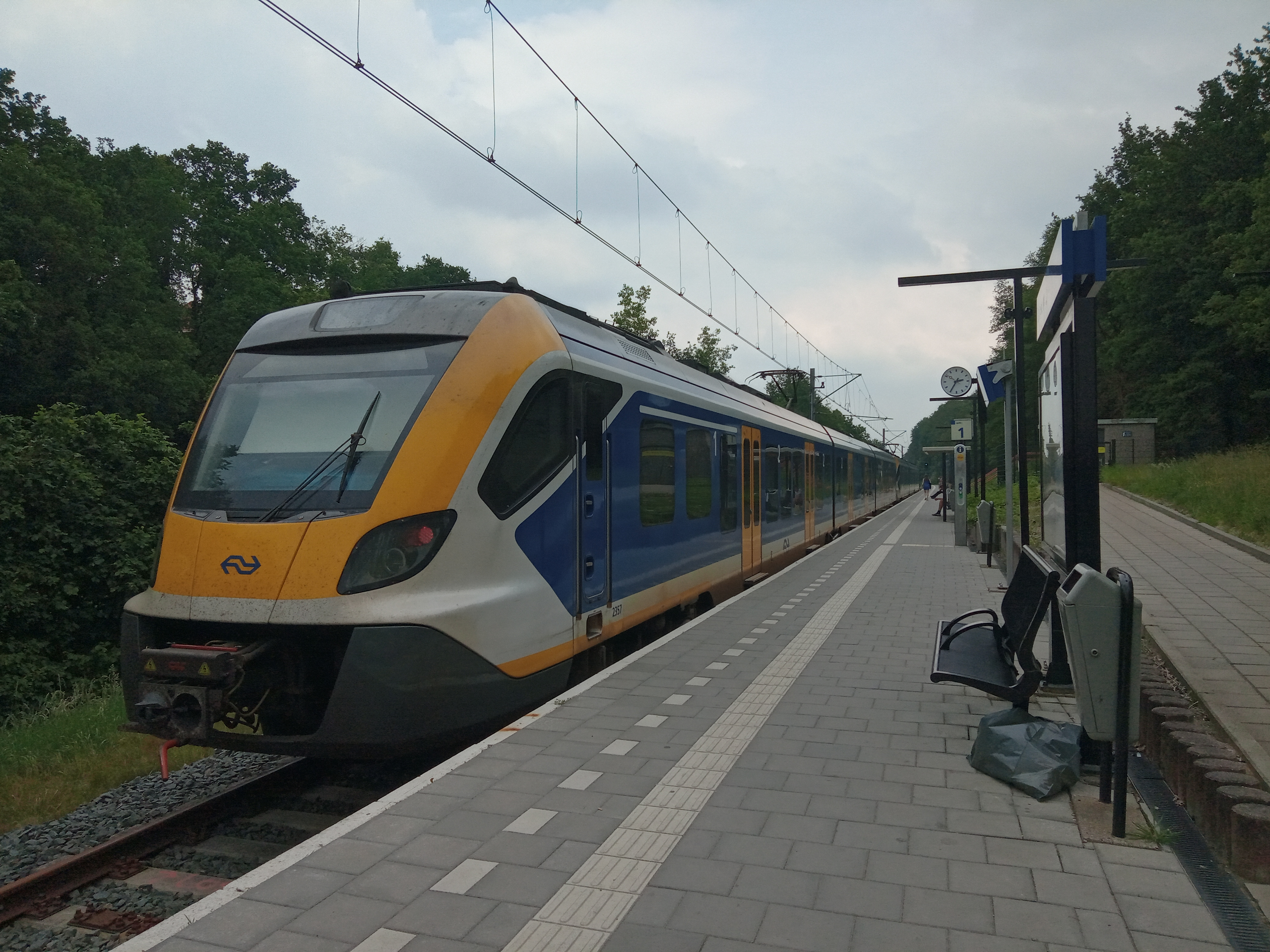
Sprinter at the station
