= List of rail accidents in the Netherlands =

This is a list of railway accidents in the Netherlands, sorted chronologically.

== 19th century ==
- March 10, 1843 – During a test run, a locomotive derailed on a railway bridge near Warmond. One person was killed, marking the first railway crash in the Netherlands.
- February 6, 1856 – A railway employee was injured near Meerssen and died a few days later.
- April 2, 1856 – A railway employee was killed in Amsterdam after falling on the track.
- June 10, 1856 – A 65-year old waiter was killed at Halfweg by a train.
- August 10, 1856 – Schiedam train accident. A train from The Hague rammed into another from The Hague, bound for Rotterdam. Three people were killed and five injured.
- June 2, 1868 – Between Breukelen and Maarssen, a freight train headed for Germany crashed into a stopped passenger train. The two hind-most carriages of the passenger train, which had been stopped to resolve a defect to its locomotive, were destroyed. One passenger was killed, and some others injured.
- February 1881 – An express train crashed into the station master's house in Woerden. Three were injured.

== 20th century ==
- September 13, 1918 – Weesp train disaster, Weesp, Netherlands. Heavy rainfall caused the embankment leading to the Merwedekanaal bridge to become unstable. When a passenger train approached the bridge, the track slid off the embankment, causing the carriages to crash into each other and the locomotive to hit the bridge. Forty-one were killed and 42 injured. In the aftermath of the disaster, a study of soil mechanics was undertaken at the Delft University of Technology.
- January 8, 1962 – The Harmelen train disaster, the deadliest railway incident in the history of the Netherlands, occurred when Leeuwarden–Rotterdam express train driver missed a warning signal in fog and passed a red signal to collide nearly head-on with another passenger train from Rotterdam to Amsterdam. Ninety-three people (including both drivers) died and 52.
- May 4, 1976 – Schiedam train accident near Schiedam; an international train collided with a local train, killing 24 people and injuring 11.
- August 29, 1979 – Nijmegen train disaster; eight died when two passenger trains collided head-on at Nijmegen.
- July 25, 1980 – Winsum train disaster; two trains collided on a single track between Groningen and Roodeschool resulting in nine deaths and 21 being injured.
- December 27, 1982 – A boat train heading for Hook of Holland collided with a local train near Rotterdam. Three people died and 20 were injured.
- November 30, 1992 – Hoofddorp train accident near Hoofddorp. An Intercity train, travelling from Amsterdam to Vlissingen derailed near Hoofddorp. Five people died, and thirty-three were injured.

== 21st century ==
=== 2000s ===
- March 20, 2003 – Roermond. The driver of an NS passenger train suffered a heart attack, ran through a red signal to collide head-on with a freight train. The driver was killed, six passengers were seriously injured. After passing a distant signal at danger the automatic safety system had not enforced a deceleration large enough to prevent a collision.
- September 5, 2006 – A diesel locomotive passed a red signal and collided with a passenger train at Amersfoort. Seventeen people were injured.
- November 20, 2006 – A train passed a red signal causing a head-on collision in Rotterdam. The passenger train was empty and no one were injured, but there was extensive damage to the rail track and its overhead power lines.
- November 21, 2006 – A train passed a red signal causing a head-on collision at Arnhem.
- October 11, 2008 – Thalys trainset 4536 running between Paris and Amsterdam collided with a Koploper ICM unit near Gouda. A steam train hauled by a BR 23 2-6-2 locomotive, which had its route set into the path of the collision, made a successful emergency stop.
- September 24, 2009 – Barendrecht train accident. Two freight trains collided head-on below a viaduct on the A15 motorway near Barendrecht, killing the driver of one train. Derailed sections landed on a parallel track, where a passenger train was approaching. resulting in a handful of minor injuries.

=== 2010s ===
- July 25, 2010 – The driver and another rail worker were injured when a Speno railgrinder failed to stop in front of the buffer stop at Stavoren. A shop behind the track was demolished.
- January 11, 2011 – An ICE express train collided with a freight train and derailed at Zevenaar. There were no injuries.
- November 28, 2011 – A Sprinter collided with a stationary Sprinter at Leiden Centraal. Three passengers were injured.
- April 21, 2012 – Sloterdijk train collision. Two trains were involved in a head-on collision between Amsterdam Centraal and Amsterdam Sloterdijk stations; one person died, at least 117 were injured.
- September 11, 2012 – A HTM city tram crashed into the back of another HTM city tram at an intersection near the railroad station of The Hague Hollands Spoor. Both were carrying a large number of passengers, and 36 people were injured.
- September 2, 2013 – The operator of an intercity train of Nederlandse Spoorwegen ignored a red light and ended up in the path of a second intercity train. The driver of the second train avoided a collision by applying the emergency brake after seeing his signal change from green to red. The official investigation concluded that after passing a yellow signal, the driver at fault applied the brakes sufficiently to satisfy the automatic control system, but not to stop before the red signal. A non-failsafe backup protection system to stop the train on approach to the red signal didn't activate as it wasn't properly configured, but wouldn't have helped anyway as the train was going too fast.
- January 15, 2014 – A passenger train from Dutch Railways derailed near the central station of Hilversum. The train was carrying around 550 passengers. No injuries were reported.
- January 21, 2014 – An empty, out-of-service tram/LRT vehicle of HTM's Randstadrail service crashed into an in-service tram/LRT Randstadrail vehicle at a tram stop, injuring four people.
- March 17, 2014 – A tram/LRT vehicle of HTM's Randstadrail service crashed into a city tram on an intersection near the city border with Delft, injuring 20 people, one severely.
- March 17, 2014 – A passenger train carrying 100 people from Syntus crashed into the trailer of a truck that had become stuck at a railroad crossing near the town of Almen. The truck driver escaped just in time, but three train passengers were injured.
- March 6, 2015 – A passenger train ran into the rear of a freight train between Tilburg Universiteit and Tilburg stations. A few passengers suffered minor injuries.
- March 12, 2015 – A fire occurred on a passenger train at Abcoude, Utrecht. All on board were evacuated; twenty-four people were taken to hospital.
- February 23, 2016 – Dalfsen train crash. A passenger train collided with a crane at Dalfsen, Overijssel. The train driver was killed, and six others were injured.
- November 18, 2016 – A passenger train derailed after colliding with a milk lorry on a level crossing at Winsum, Groningen. Eighteen people were injured, three seriously.
- April 28, 2017 – A passenger train collided with a truck on a level crossing at Wouw and derailed, injuring the driver.
- September 20, 2018 – Oss rail accident; a passenger train collided with a Stint cart on a level crossing at Oss, killing four children and injuring two other people.
- January 11, 2019 – A passenger train collided with a truck on a level crossing in Leeuwarden, Friesland and derailed. Six people sustained minor injuries. The truck driver had parked on the level crossing while asking for directions.

=== 2020s ===
- May 22, 2020 – Hooghalen train crash; collision between a train and agricultural vehicle on a level crossing in Hooghalen, Drenthe. The train driver died, and two other people were injured.
- November 2, 2020 – De Akkers metro station crash. Metro train derailment caused by failure to stop at De Akkers metro station's terminus, Spijkenisse. The train crashed through a buffer stop and came to rest partially atop a whale statue in front of the station.
- October 17, 2022 – A train collided with a disabled bus at Bergen Op Zoom level crossing. The bus driver had left the bus, but was unable to prevent the collision, which split the bus and damaged the overhead wires.
- April 4, 2023 – 2023 Voorschoten train crash; a passenger train derailed near Voorschoten (between Leiden and The Hague), killing one person and injuring many more.
- January 20, 2025 - a passenger train collided with an excavator near Bunnik. The train driver was lightly injured.
- October 30, 2025 - a passenger train collided with a semi truck loaded with pears on a crossing near Meteren. 5 people were injured.

== See also ==
- 1975 Dutch train hostage crisis
- 1977 Dutch train hostage crisis
- Lists of rail accidents
