= Sprinter New Generation =

Class of Dutch electric multiple units

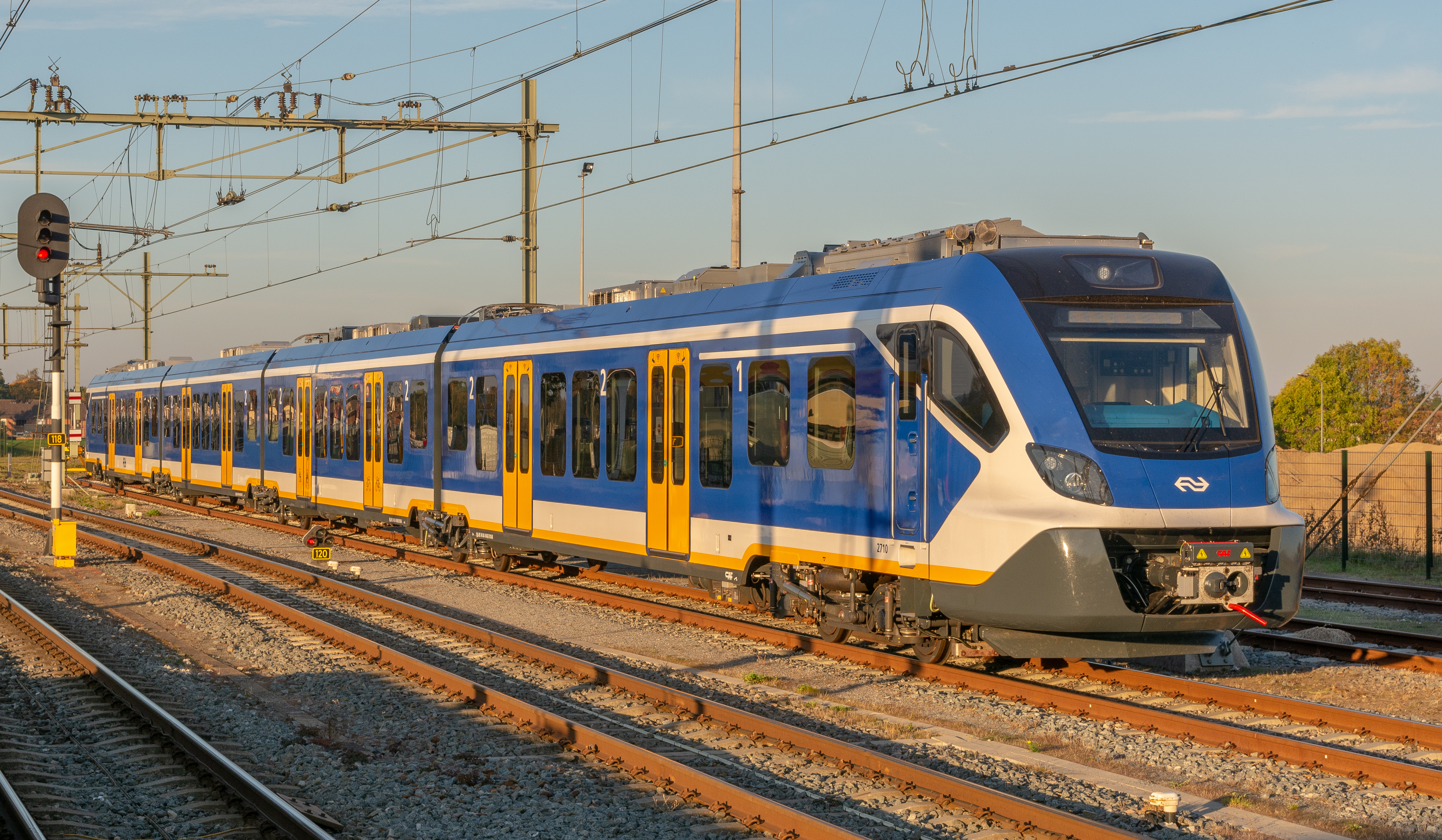
- SNG 2710

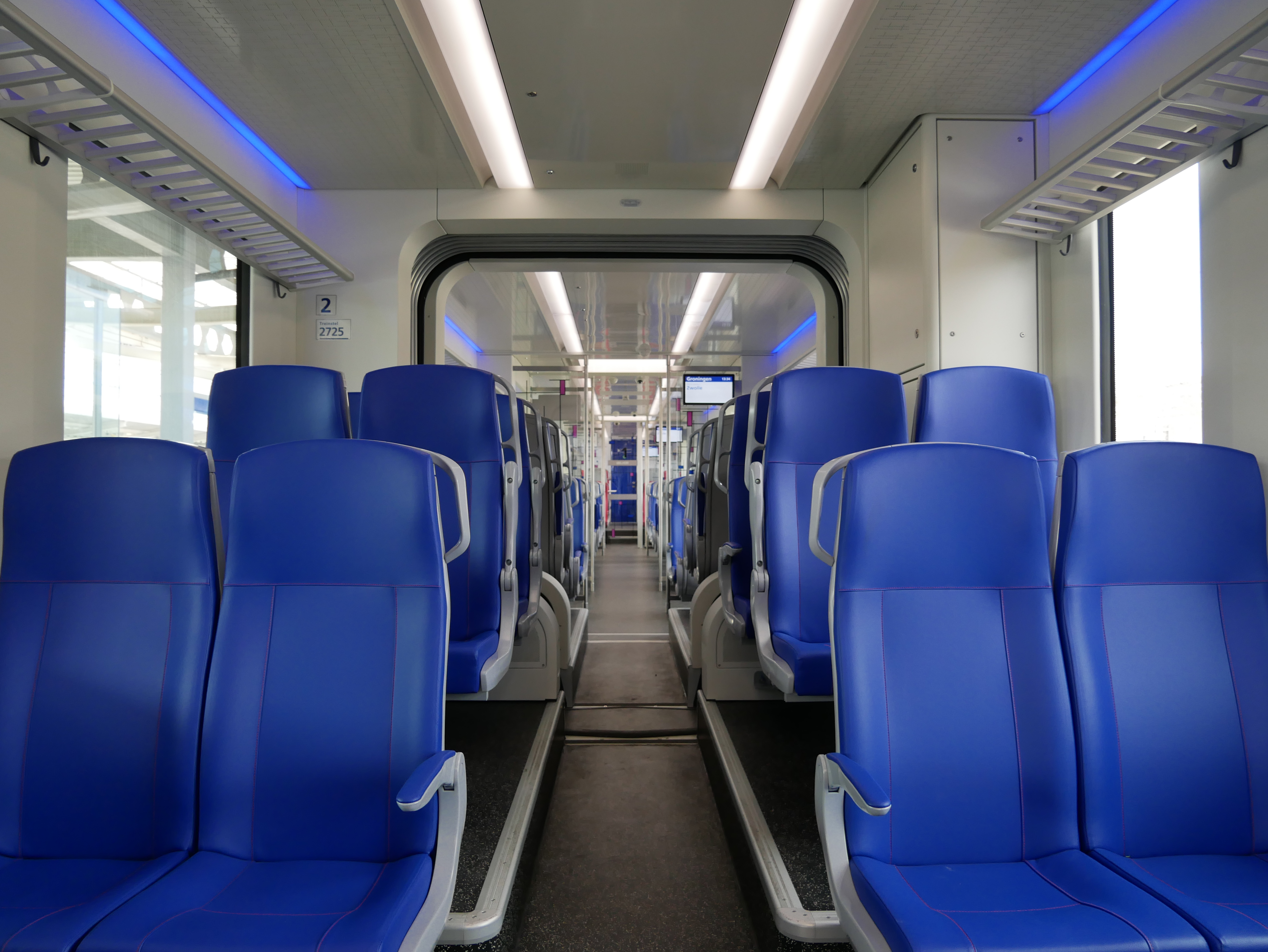
- Interior
- In service: 2018–present
- Manufacturer: CAF
- Built at: Beasain, Spain
- Family name: Civity
- Replaced: NS SGMm, NS DDM-1
- Number under construction: 88; SNG 3: 50; SNG 4: 38
- Number built: 118; SNG 3: 68; SNG 4: 50
- Formation: 3: mABk–B1–mBk; 4: mABk–B1–B2–mABk
- Operator: Nederlandse Spoorwegen
- Line served: Main network (Hoofdrailnet)

Specifications
- Train length: 3: 59.56 m (195 ft 5 in); 4: 75.76 m (248 ft 7 in)
- Car length: mABk/mBk: 21.68 m (71 ft 2 in); B1/B2: 16.2 m (53 ft 2 in)
- Width: 2.88 m (9 ft 5 in)
- Height: 4.3 m (14 ft 1 in)
- Floor height: 760 mm (30 in) (entry)
- Wheel diameter: 850 mm (33 in) (new)
- Maximum speed: 160 km/h (100 mph)
- Weight: 3: 110 t (110 long tons; 120 short tons); 4: 138 t (136 long tons; 152 short tons)
- Traction system: 2×Mitsubishi Electric MAP-243-15VD288 (SiC-IGBT VVVF)
- Traction motors: (4 or 6)×Mitsubishi Electric MB-5165-A 240 kW (320 hp) asynchronous induction motor
- Gearbox: CAF MIIRA AHHD-430-4.822-1
- Gear ratio: 4.822
- Acceleration: 1.3 m/s^{2} (4.3 ft/s^{2})
- Deceleration: 1.1 m/s^{2} (3.6 ft/s^{2})
- UIC classification: 3: Bo′2′2′Bo′; 4: Bo′2′(Bo′)2′Bo′
- Safety systems: ATB-EG, ERTMS
- Track gauge: 1,435 mm (4 ft 8 1/2 in) standard gauge

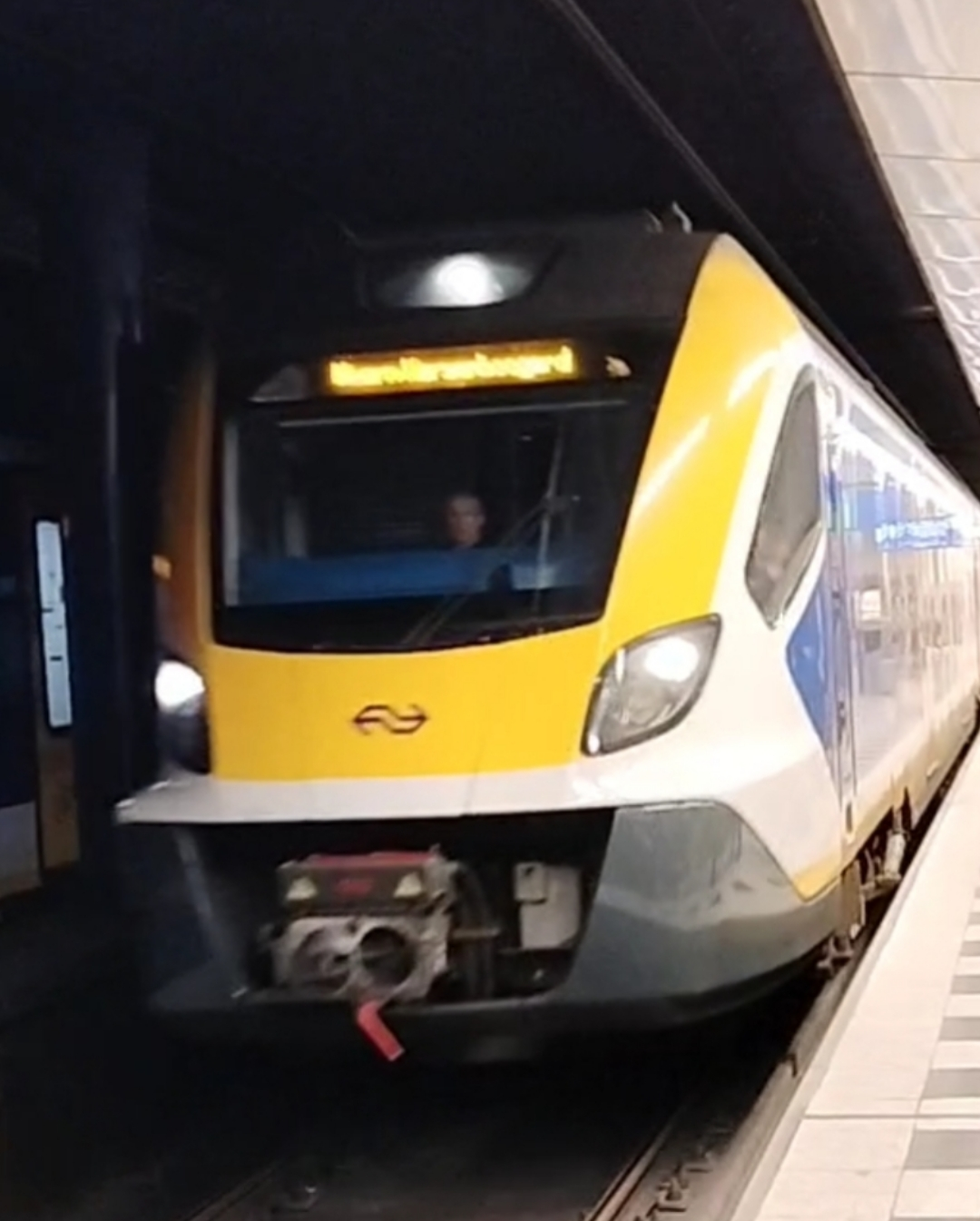
SNG at Schiphol Airport station, bound for Hoorn Kersenboogerd railway station.

The Sprinter New Generation (SNG) is an electric multiple unit train from the Dutch Railways or Nederlandse Spoorwegen. The trains are designed and built by the Spanish train builder Construcciones y Auxiliar de Ferrocarriles (CAF), who bases the trains on the Civity platform. With a top speed of 160 km/h (100 mph), the trains are primarily intended to replace older train equipment (primarily the Urban Regional Material (NS SGMm) and the push-pull double decker DDM-1 carriages), but are also intended for the growth of the number of passengers on the Hoofdrailnet or main rail network.

The Sprinter New Generation is characterized by a spacious interior, with much light and space. This is achieved through the use of Jacobs bogies, resulting in wide-body and spacious transitions. The low floor makes the train easier to access for the disabled.

== History ==
=== Origins ===
In 1983 the first plans were made for the replacement of NS Mat '64 or Materieel '64 EMUs. The intention was to have a large series of slow trains in service from the early 1990s, which would replace the Materiel '64 at once. The series became known as the Stoptreinmaterieel '90 (SM '90). From 1992, train builder Talbot built a small test series of nine train sets, as a prelude to a large series of around 250 two and three-car sets. The test series was equipped with new technologies for that time, such as computer-controlled control and diagnosis systems. However, these techniques proved to be less reliable than anticipated, and therefore a large follow-up order was omitted. The series was taken out of service at the end of 2005.

Because there was a need for new equipment to replace the Materieel '64, in 2005 NS placed an order for 35 trainsets of the Sprinter Lighttrain type. These sets are based on the German DBAG Class 425, but have been adapted for use on the Dutch rail network. After placing follow-up orders in 2007 and 2009, there were 121 ordered train sets. It turned out that these couples did not fully meet the wishes of the Dutch Railways, as in the initial phase the train proved unable to withstand wintry weather. Travelers and traveler organizations also complained about the lack of toilets on board. Because of these points, further follow-up orders were cancelled, and the last train set was delivered in 2012.

The Sprinter Lighttrain has replaced the four-part train sets of Materiel '64, Plan T; they went out of service between 2008 and 2010. Due to the absence of further follow-up orders, it was not yet possible to replace part of the remaining two-part trainsets of the Materiel '64, the Plan V.

In addition to the lack of additional equipment to replace the Materieel '64, a number of issues began to play a role in the demand for new train equipment around 2013: the high passenger growth and the inevitable replacement of the Stadsgewestelijk Materieel or NS SGMm, the first generation of Sprinters. The number of travelers on the hoofdrailnet (main network) grew by 24% from 2004 to 2013. This growth can largely be explained by an increase in population, a larger number of students, an increase in fuel prices and the running of extra trains. Because students, like commuters, travel especially during rush hour, the demand for transport, and therefore the demand for rolling stock, is greater during rush hours.

After a thorough renovation was conducted from 2003 to 2009, plans for the replacement of the Stadsgewestelijk Materieel were started at the end of the 2000s. This equipment was put into service between 1975 and 1983, so the first sets were forty years old in 2015. Because the technical lifespan of railway equipment is on average 40 years, they needed to be replaced. Therefore, NS placed an urgent order for 58 Stadler FLIRT trains in 2015 as a stopgap measure until the SNG trains could be fully introduced in December 2018.

=== Interior design process ===
Between 13 and 20 March 2015, NS gave travelers and staff the opportunity to choose possible interiors. Thanks to a test set-up at Rotterdam Central, interested parties were able to choose from three interiors, with seats for the first and second class and folding seats. The results have been an important factor in the interior choices of the new Sprinters.

At the end of September 2015, representatives of interest groups such as the Public Transport Travelers Association were given the opportunity to view a model of the new Sprinter New Generation in Spain. NS appeared to have chosen interior C from the experiment, with Sophia seats from the Spanish Fainsa and purple folding seats.

=== Exterior colour change ===
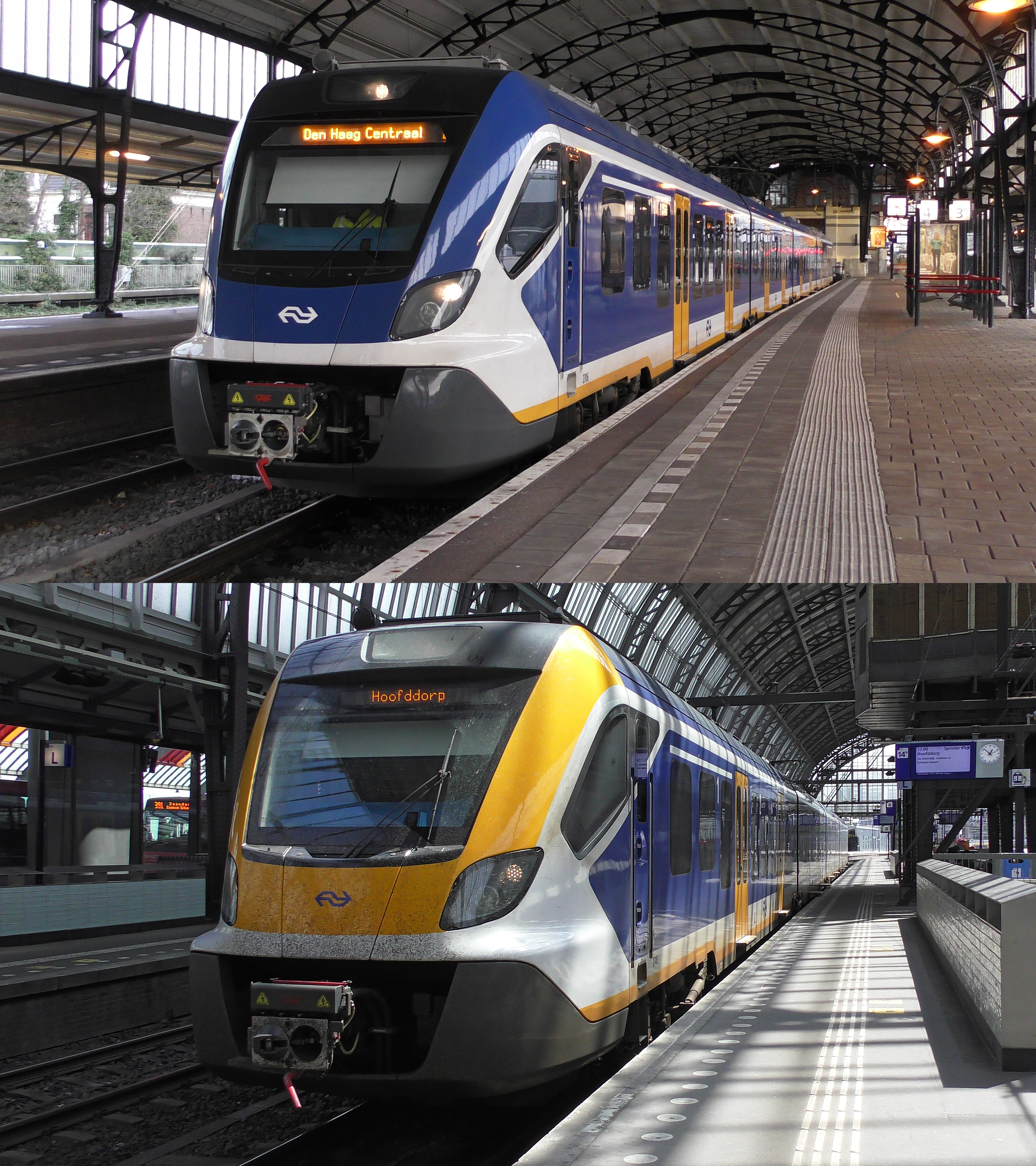
An SNG with a blue front (top) and a yellow front (bottom)

Initially, the SNG trains had a dark blue front. While this colouring met European standards, the combination of the dark colour and the large window made it difficult to see the train from level crossings. Lack of visibility was found to be the lead cause of a collision between a tractor and an SNG at an unsecured railway crossing near Hooghalen on 22 May 2020, which killed the train driver. NS decided to change the colour of the fronts to yellow, the first of which started service in May 2021. NS would repaint 150 trains it already had, while new trains would be delivered by CAF with the yellow colour. The transition to the new colour was near-complete by August 2022. A similar change was made to the FLIRT trains in 2023.

== See also ==
- Trains in the Netherlands
- NS Sprinter Lighttrain
- NS SGMm
- NS VIRM
- NS Intercity Materieel
- NS DD-AR
- NS Class 1700
- Stadler FLIRT
- Stadler GTW
