= Stadsgewestelijk Materieel =

Electric multiple unit

NS Class 2100 / 2900
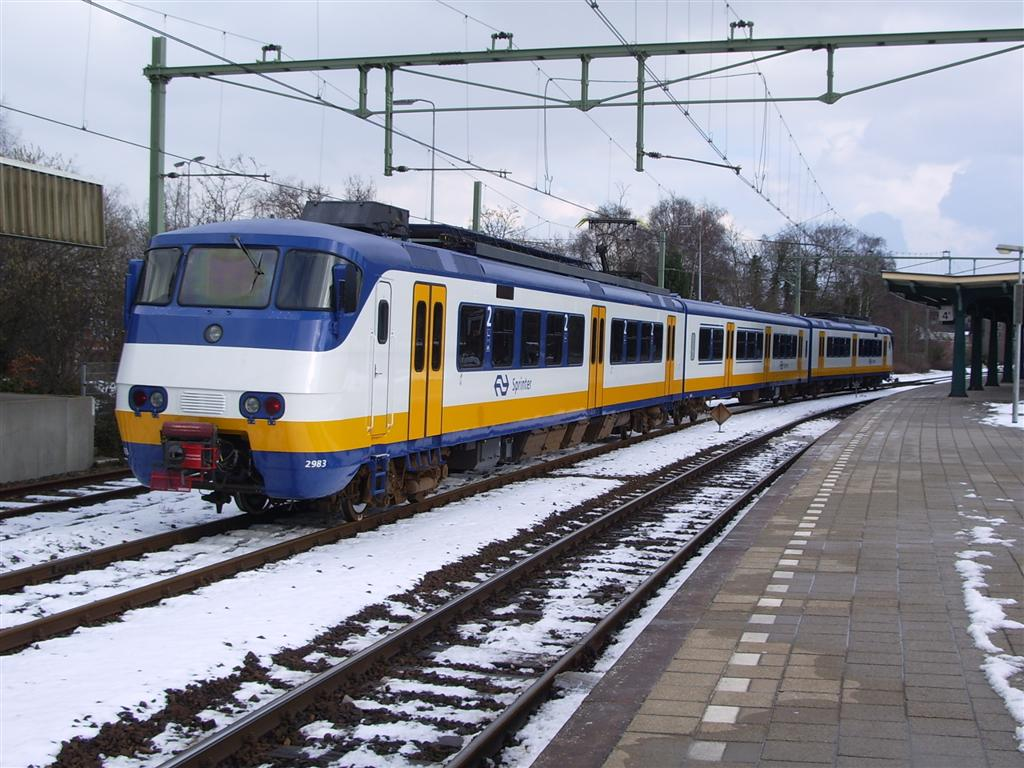
- Sprinter Unit 2983 at Deventer

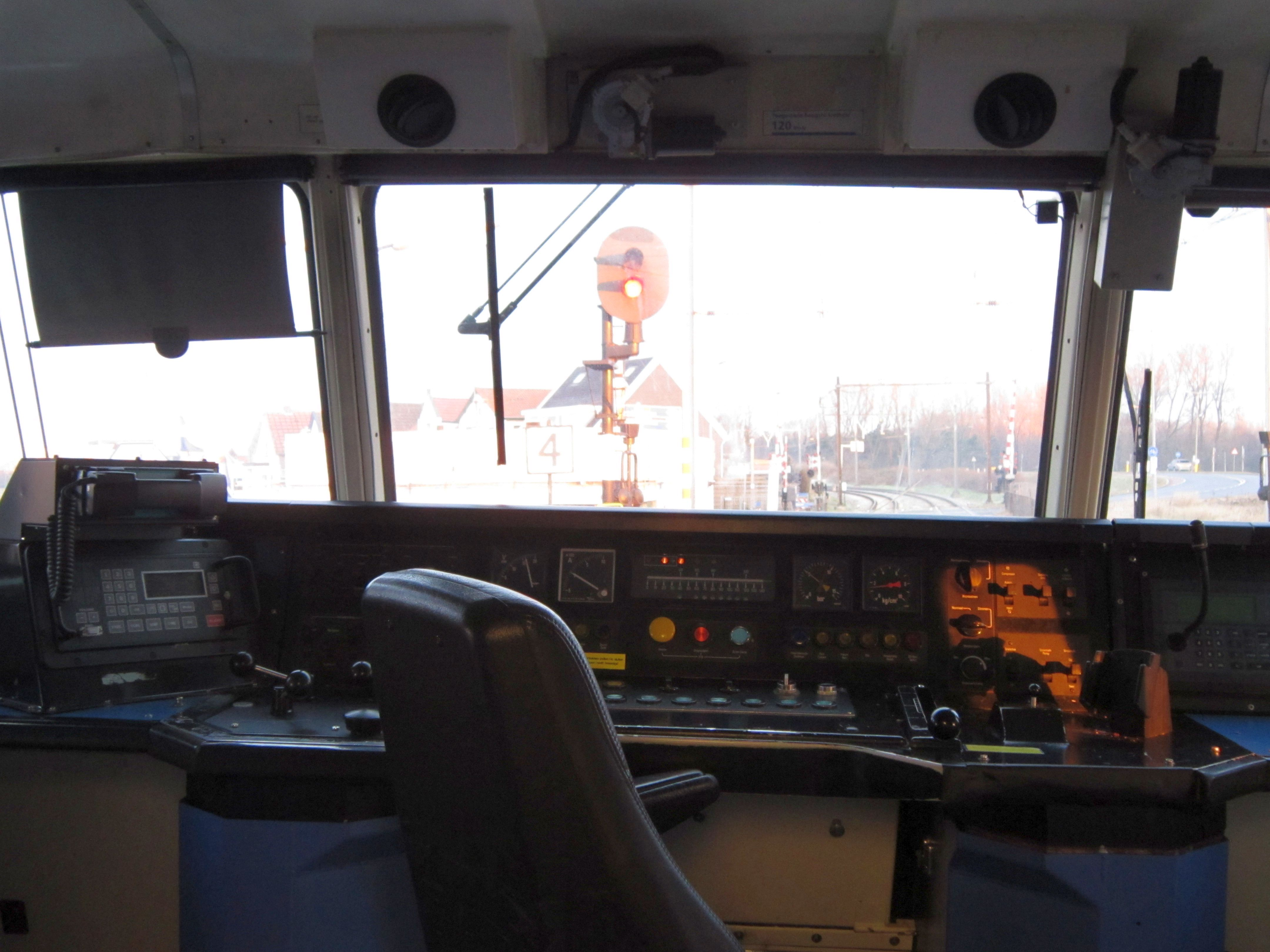
- In service: 1975–2021
- Manufacturer: Talbot
- Replaced: Mat '64
- Number built: 90
- Formation: 2 cars (2100); 3 cars (2900)
- Capacity: 2100 – 32 (1st), 126 (2nd); 2900 – 40 (1st), 184 (2nd)
- Operator: NS Reizigers

Specifications
- Maximum speed: 125 km/h (78 mph)
- Power output: 1,280 kW (1,720 hp)
- Electric system: 1.5 kV DC Catenary
- Current collection: Pantograph
- Safety system: ATB-EG
- Track gauge: 1,435 mm (4 ft 8 1/2 in) standard gauge

The Stadsgewestelijk Materieel or SGM (transl. Suburban Equipment – transl. City Regional rolling stock) was an electric multiple unit (EMU) train type that was operated by the Dutch railway company Nederlandse Spoorwegen. They were built from 1975 to 1983 by Talbot and retired from service between 2018 and 2021.

== Names ==
- Stadsgewestelijk Materieel (SGM)
- Sprinter
- Plan Y
- Mat '74/Materieel 1974

== General information ==
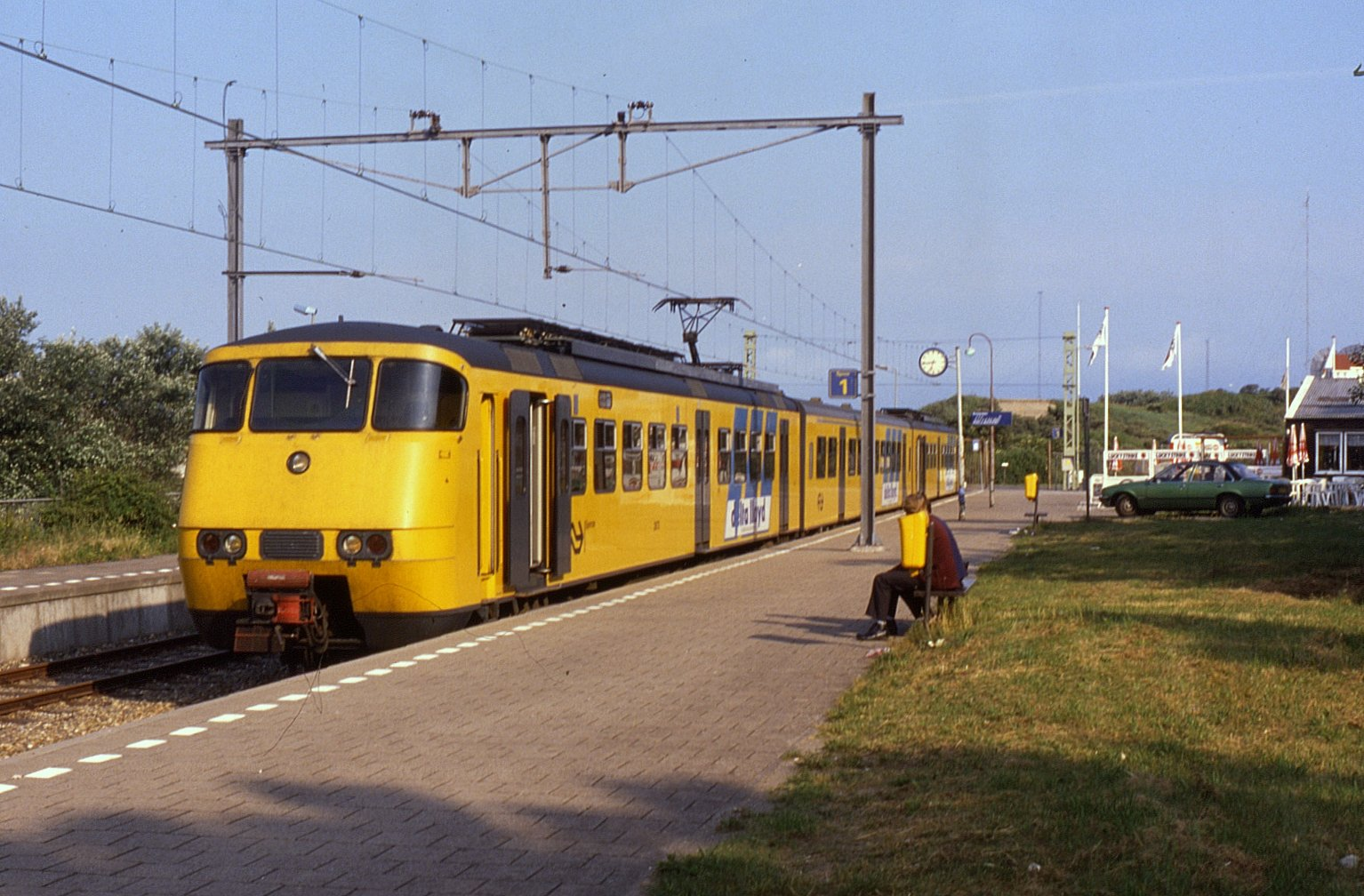
An SGM in original livery at Hoek van Holland Strand railway station, June 1990

The SGM was the first train type in the Netherlands to be specified for frequent local train operation, since the Spoorslag '70 timetable introduced the concept of a strict separation of all-stop local trains and skip-stop express trains in order to improve punctuality and speed as well as to attract more passengers to rail. The SGM trains had fast acceleration as distances between stations were short, so they needed to be able to speed up and brake quickly. The original idea was for them to be able to operate through services on the Amsterdam Metro network, so third rail would be needed as well as overhead pick-up, however in 1969 this idea was dropped. NS also did consider importing the Paris RER MS 61 train model from France, which was cheaper (per 3-car MS-61 unit as compared to a 2-car SGM unit) than developing the SGM from scratch, however, it was for various reasons deemed unsuitable for the Dutch rail network. The two-car SGM units could accelerate from 0–125 km/h (0–78 mph) in 72 seconds. Each coach has 3 doors on each side, to allow for quick loading and unloading.

== First generation (SGM-0) ==
The first batch of 15 were delivered between March and November 1975 and were numbered 2001 – 2015. These were delivered at the same time as the last batches of Plan V stock. These are 2 car units. These were to be used on the Zoetermeer Stadslijn and so did not feature first class, a toilet or a gangway between each coach. 2014 and 2015 were built with different electric traction, but their trial was unsuccessful and so the units were stored for many years, until 2000 when they were fitted with Insulated-gate bipolar transistor.

== Second generation (SGM-1) ==
A total of 60 were ordered in 1977 and started being delivered in September 1978 and finished in 1980. These were numbered 2021 – 2080. These were all delivered as 2 car units. These featured a toilet and a gangway. In 1983 2036 – 2080 were strengthened up to three-car units, with the middle coach featuring a first class section. These were renumbered 2836 – 2880 at the same time.

== Third generation (SGM-2) ==
These were delivered in 1983 directly as three-car units. They were numbered 2881 – 2895. When these were delivered there were 30 two-car units and 60 three-car units.

== Schemes ==
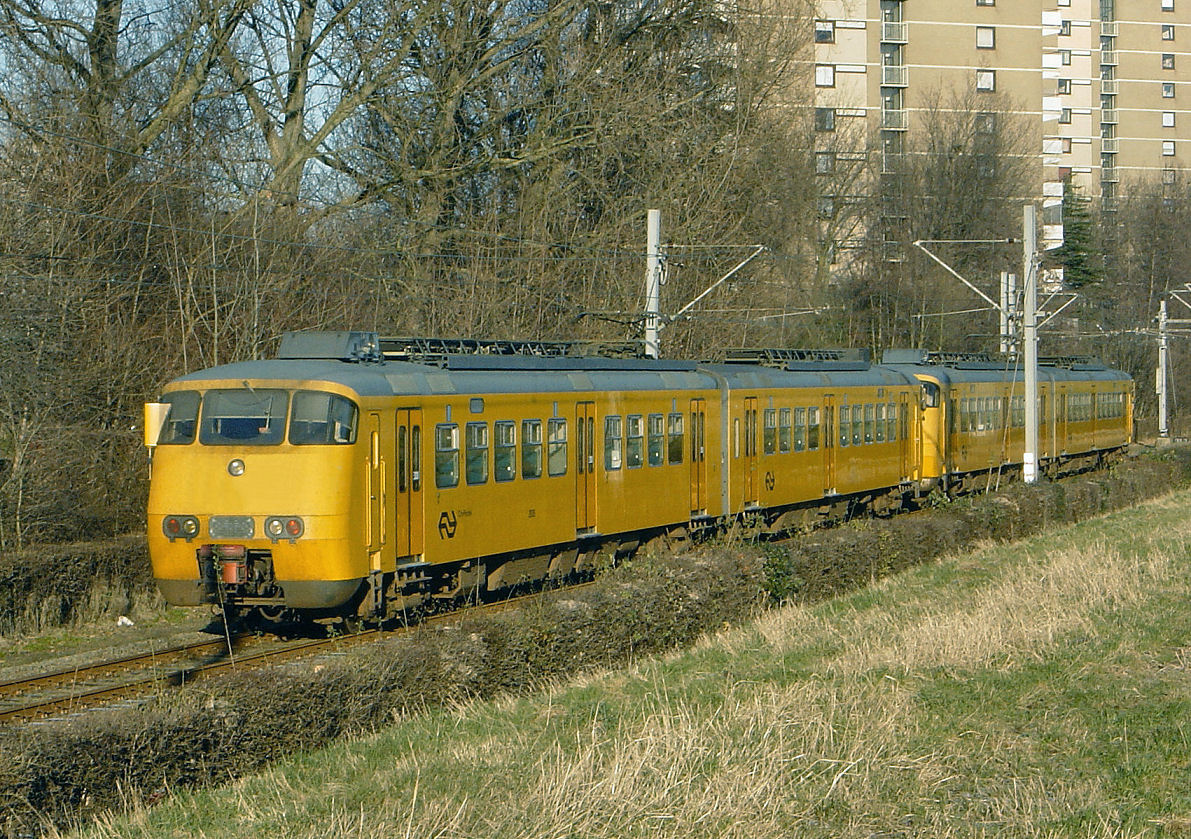
CityPendel in Zoetermeer

=== Spitspendel ===
2027 and 2029 were converted to Spitspendels in 1994. These were used between Rotterdam Centraal and Vlaardingen during the rush hours. During their rebuilding, it was attempted to make the entry and exit faster and to increase the capacity in the train. Many seats were changed to tip up seats and the first class was removed. 2027 also was given an all over advert for the Algemeen Dagblad newspaper.

=== Strandsprinter ===
Because in the 1990s the Intercity from Zandvoort aan Zee to Maastricht and Heerlen were too long for the platforms in Overveen and Zandvoort, this service was cut back to Haarlem in late 1995. Two sprinters SGM-II (2026 and 2028) were then dedicated to the service between Haarlem and Zandvoort. These were given branding saying «Strandsprinter» and beach balls along the outside.

=== Citypendel ===
In 1997 all the two-car units (2001–2015, 2021–2035) were named Stadspendels and operated on the Zoetermeer Stadslijn and the Hofpleinlijn. The name was soon changed to Citypendel. More seats and the entire first class were removed to create more standing room, giving a more metro-like appearance, and so these trains gained the nickname standing trains. The livery was changed to fully yellow, including the doors, and without adverts. The trains are made for one man operation and for this had mirrors fitted, so the driver could see the platform. Some sets also featured CCTV cameras.

=== Nachtsprinter ===
Between November 1994 and April 1995 unit 2008 was converted specially for operation of a night service on the Zoetermeer Stadslijn. The service was not a success, largely due to the lack of a toilet on board.

== The modernisations of the sprinter (SGMm) ==
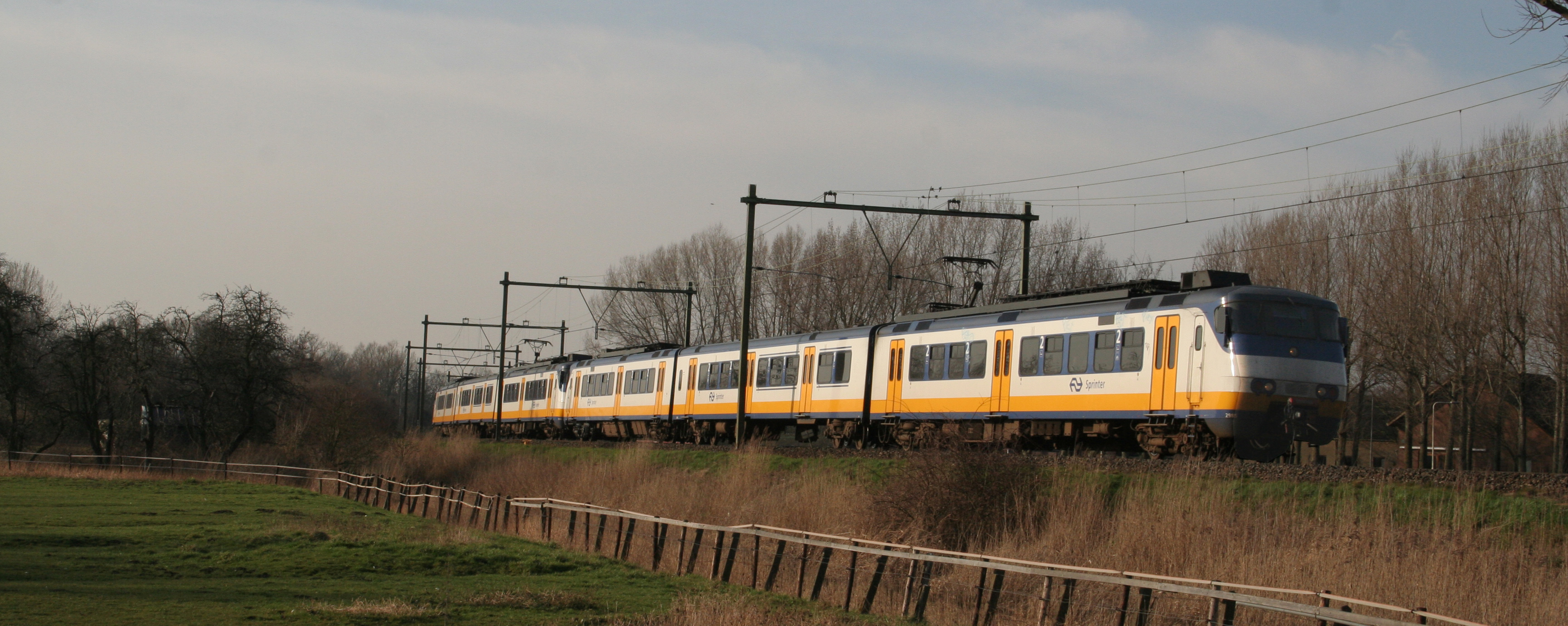
A renewed Sprinter, number 2985

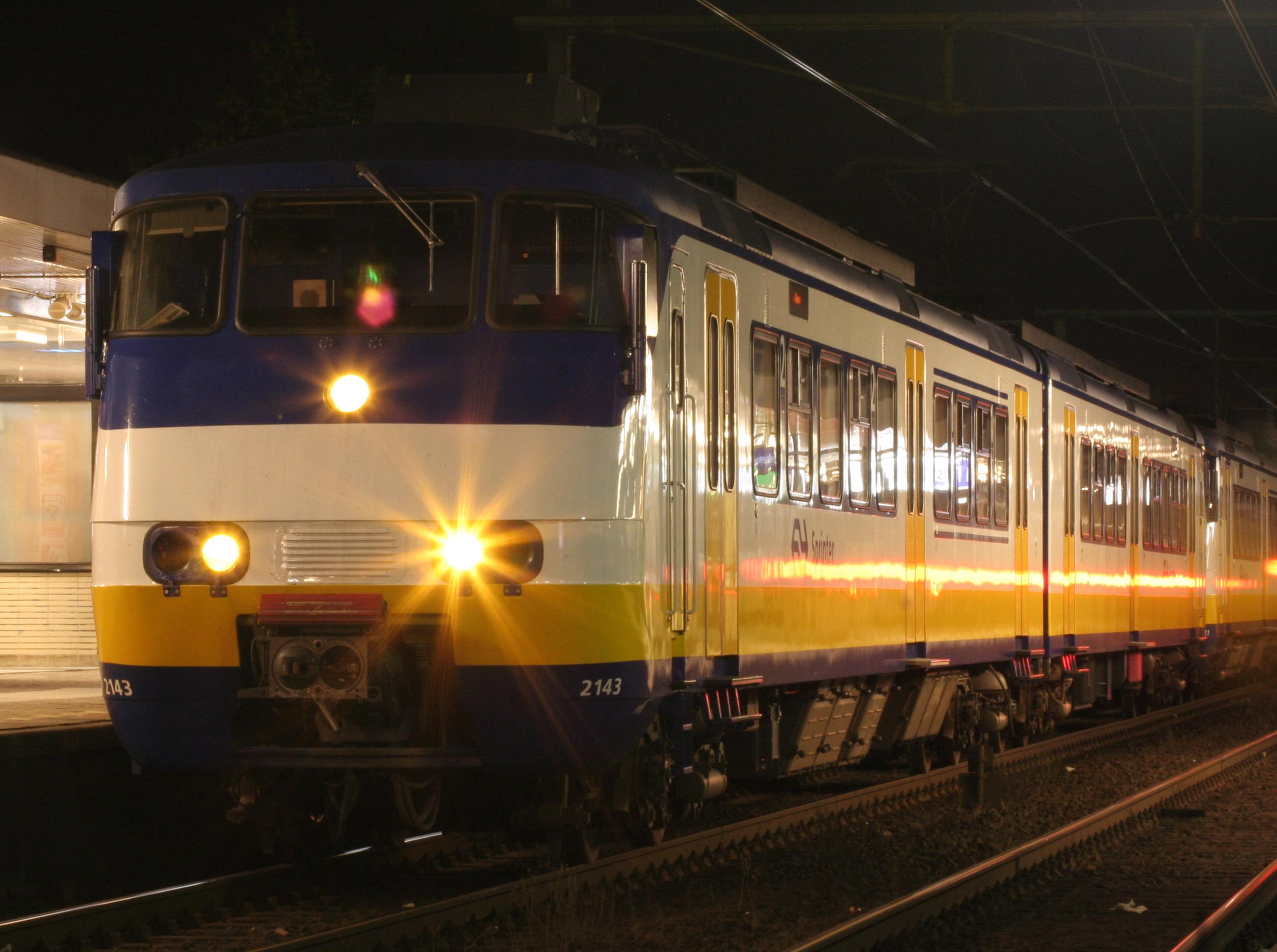
A renewed CityPendel, number 2143

From the summer of 2003 until late 2006, all the three-car Sprinters (2836–2895) were modernised by Bombardier Transportation in Randers, Denmark.

The interior was completely renewed, with the partitions between each section is now made of glass. The ceiling is now gray and white, the floor is a dark gray with sparkly floors. The middle coach also gained extra doors, so that each coach has the same number of doors. The traction system was also changed, so that the trains can accelerate faster. The conductor's room has also disappeared, allowing for more second class seats. The trains now have an automatic passenger information system, which announces the next station. Scrolling along the screen it shows all the stations called at as well as arrival times. The outside doors shut automatically if nobody has passed through them for a certain amount of time. On the outside of the train, the destination indicators also change, displaying their final destination and their next station. All sets also have new numbers, which are 100 more than previously e.g. 2936 was 2836. The livery also changed. The base colour is white, with blue and yellow. There is a blue bottom, then a yellow section, including yellow doors, then white with blue window surrounds and a blue roof and around the cab windows. This livery is known as vlaflip (after a type of two-tone pudding). In 2006 two Citypendel sets also went to Randers, to see if it was worthwhile to refurbish these also. It was decided they should and in 2007 the first set left for refurbishment and finished in 2009. These were renumbered with 110 added onto the original numbers e.g. 2001 is now 2111. These sets now have gangways between coaches as well as a first class area. Energy usage was also reduced by 25% at this time.

== Incidents ==
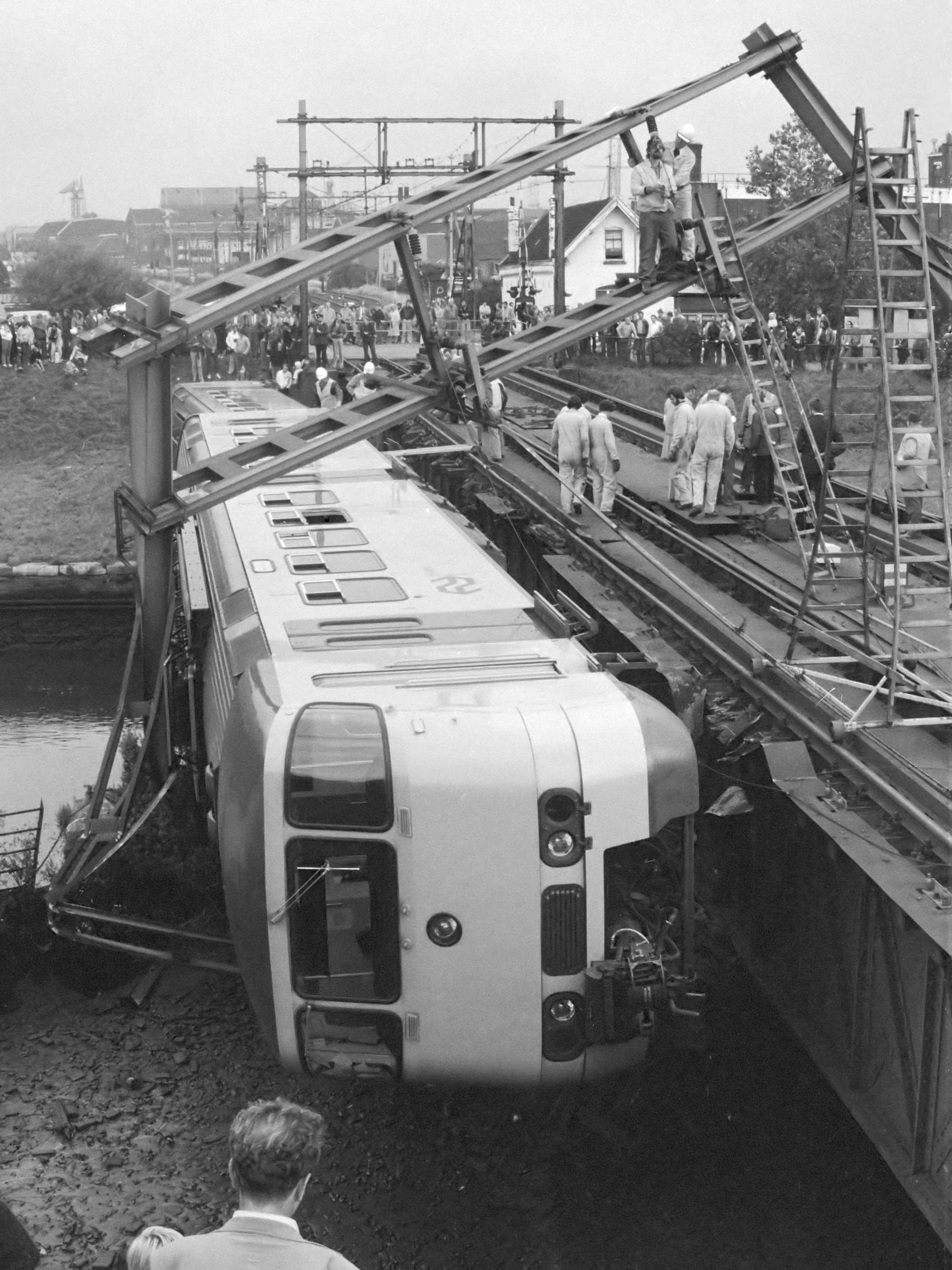
The derailment at Vlaardingen, 1980

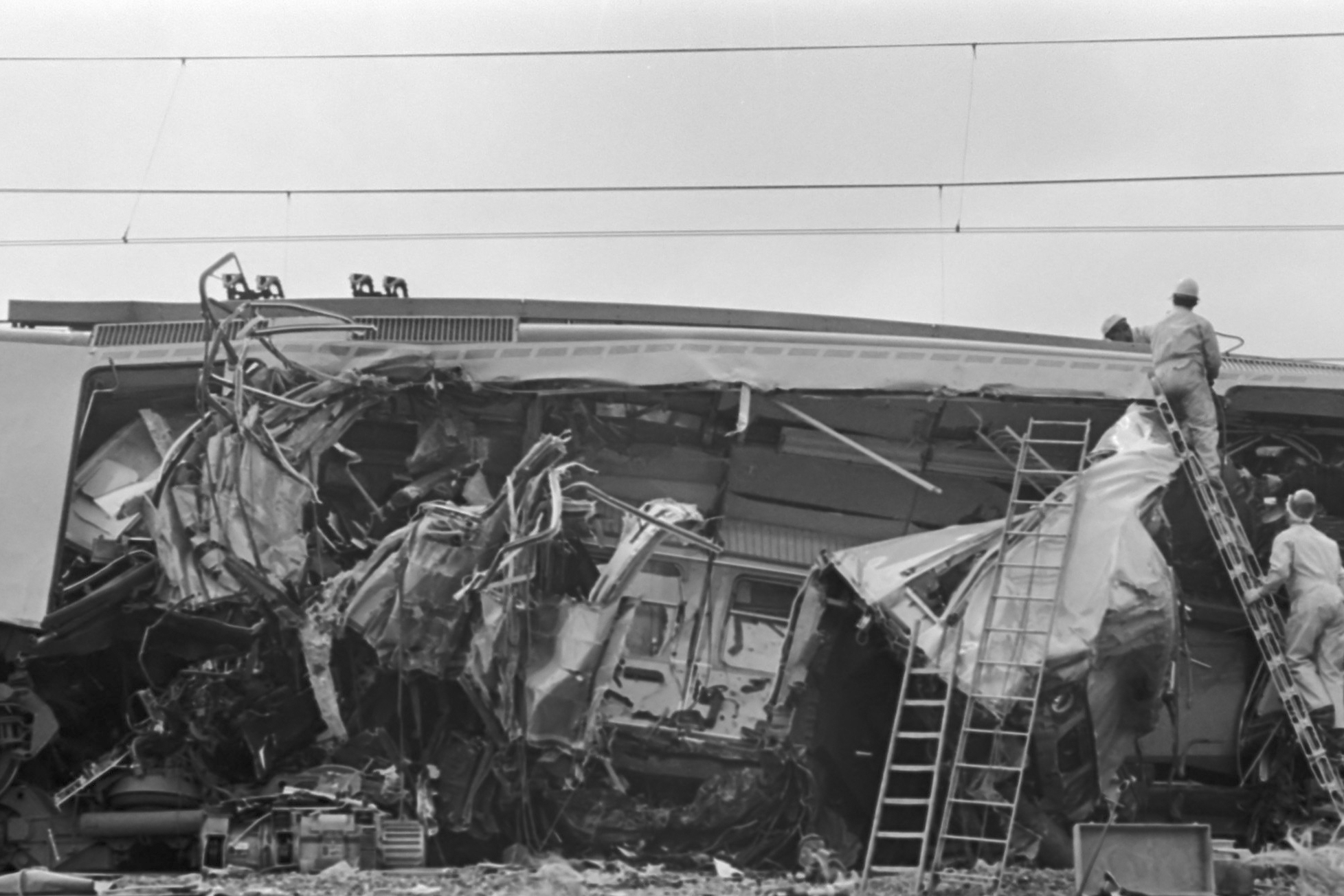
Schiedam train disaster, 1976. The leading coach of set number 2008 was completely destroyed after the accident

- On 4 May 1976 sets 2001 and 2008 were involved in a collision with NS 1311, at the time hauling a D-train to Hook of Holland in Schiedam, Rotterdam. Twenty-four people died and a new coach had to be built for 2008 by Talbot for 1.5 million Euros.
- On 15 September 1980 the swing bridge in Vlaardingen was not fully shut when 2049 crossed the bridge at a low speed. The train derailed and fell off the bridge, but did not land in the water. The set was out of use for 1 year.
- On 27 December 1980 2057 crashed into a works train for the Schiphollijn in Warmond. The train suffered accident damage.
- On 13 December 2003 2869 did not stop in time at the terminus station of Den Haag Centraal and continued into a shop in the station hall.
- On 15 December 2007 an empty unit continued through a buffer and derailed at Amsterdam Zuid.
- On 21 May 2009 2 people died in Teuge (between Apeldoorn and Deventer) by an unmonitored level crossing.
- On 14 December 2016, a Sprinter was evacuated at Amsterdam Sloterdijk due to a fire in a toilet. Arson is suspected.

== Changes for Citypendels ==
When the Zoetermeer Stadslijn and Hofpleinlijn were converted to RandstadRail in 2006, Citypendels were no longer used here. They were used on peak hour services until refurbishment. Now they are used together with the three-car sprinter sets.

== Current numbering ==
- Plan Y1 – 2111 – 2125
- Plan Y2 – 2131 – 2145
- Plan Y2 – 2936 – 2980
- Plan Y3 – 2981 – 2995

== Services operated ==
The SGM's were regularly used on these services in the timetable of 2021. The trains were planned to be taken out of service in 2020, but multiple factors, such as the delayed delivery of the Sprinter New Generation, caused the extension of the service. The last SGM's have been taken out the schedule on 11 December 2021. Due to COVID-19 pandemic regulations, a farewell ride could not be organised. Instead, the last train was visible to the general public in the Dutch Railway Museum between December 2022 and July 2023.

== Preserved units ==
Currently, three SGM trains are preserved for other use. All other SGM units have been scrapped.

- 2133 for the Dutch Railway Museum as a heritage unit.
- 2134 for ProRail for training purposes.
- 2995, still owned by Nederlandse Spoorwegen. Current goal for the train is unclear.
