= Spurt (Dutch Railways) =

Train service in the Netherlands

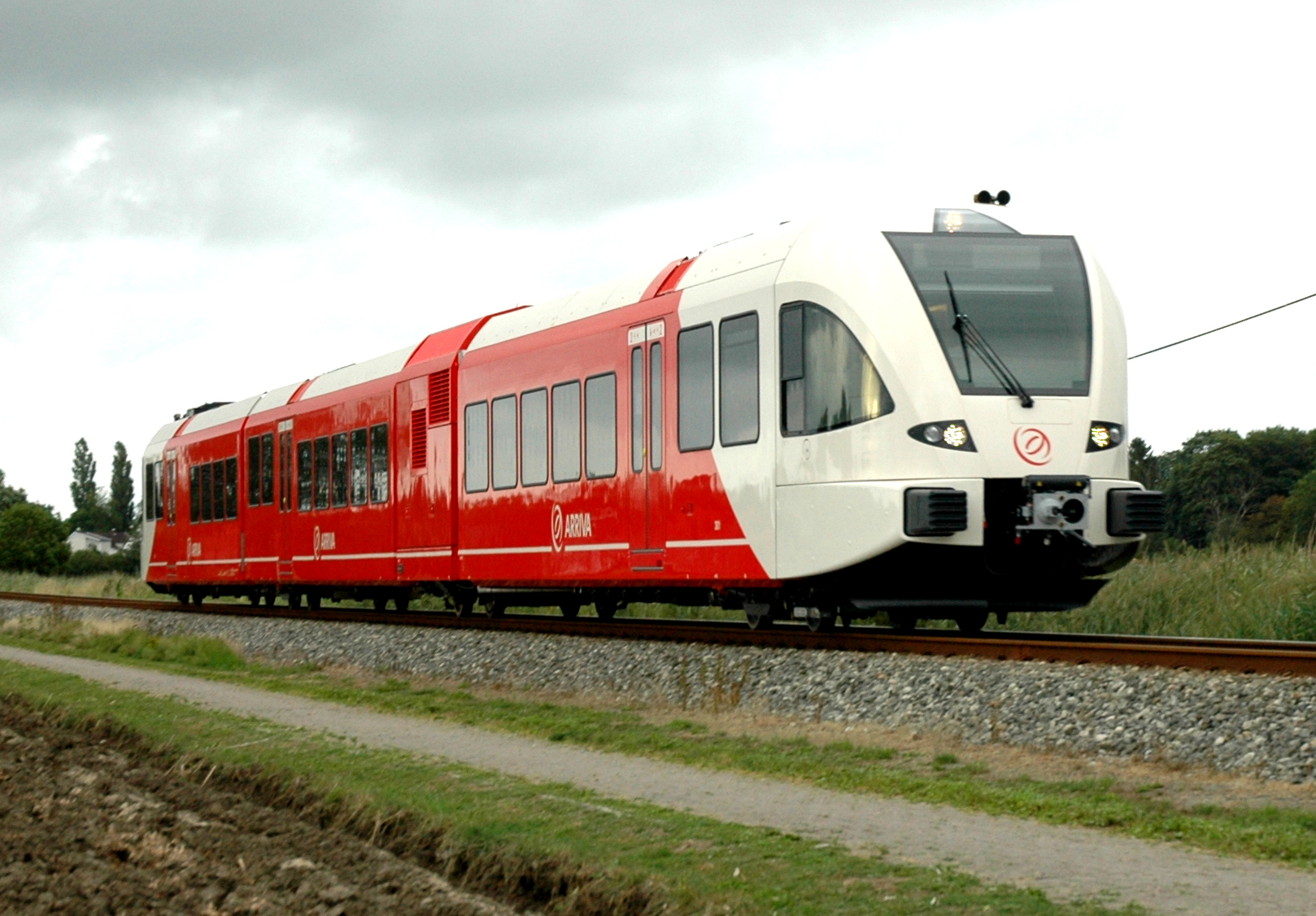
Stadler GTW 2/8 in Arriva Spurt Livery

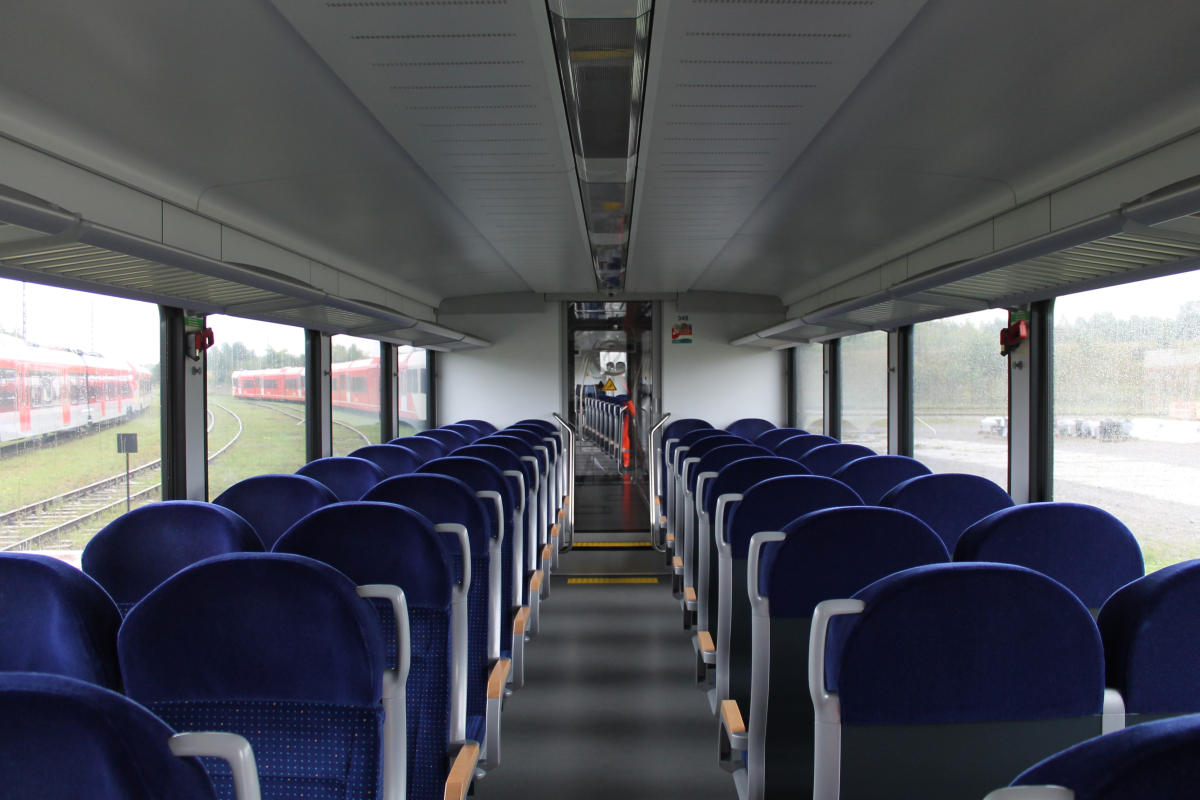
Interior of the Spurt

Spurt (Dutch pronunciation: [spʏrt]) is a trade name used by Arriva Netherlands for most of the Stadler GTW trains operated in that country. The current Arriva fleet includes both 2-car (GTW 2/6) and 3-car (GTW 2/8) variants and both Electric and Diesel powered examples. Eight of the units are equipped for operation through to Leer in Germany.

== Accidents and incidents ==
- On 23 February 2016, a Spurt train was involved in a collision with a crane on a level crossing at Dalfsen, Overijssel and was derailed. One person was killed and six were injured.
- On 19 November 2016, a Spurt train was involved in a collision with a milk lorry on a level crossing at Winsum, Groningen and was derailed. Eighteen people were injured, three seriously.
- On 27 March 2017, a Spurt train was involved in a collision with a car on a level crossing at Harlingen, Friesland, two people were killed.

== Models ==
A model of the Arriva Spurt liveried GTW 2/6 (Diesel Version) in HO Scale (1:87) has recently (Dec 2011) been produced by German model manufacturer PIKO as model no 59526 (DC 2-rail version) and no 59326 (AC 3-rail version).
