= Hooghalen train crash =

Rail accident in Drenthe, Netherlands

- Front of the train after the collision

- Location of Hooghalen, Drenthe

Details
- Date: 22 May 2020; 16:02 CEST (14:02 UTC)
- Location: Near Hooghalen, Drenthe
- Coordinates: 52.8973°N 6.5366°E
- Country: Netherlands
- Line: Meppel–Groningen railway
- Operator: Nederlandse Spoorwegen (NS)
- Incident type: Collision
- Cause: Line obstructed by vehicle

Statistics
- Passengers: 52
- Deaths: 1
- Injured: 3

On 22 May 2020, a Sprinter service by the Nederlandse Spoorwegen (NS) running from Zwolle to Groningen, collided with a tractor trying to cross the tracks at a passive railway crossing near Hooghalen on the Meppel–Groningen railway. The train driver was killed instantly, while three people were injured. The driver of the tractor escaped without injuries. According to a subsequent investigation by ProRail, the two drivers did not see each other until a few seconds before the collision. Lack of visibility in poor weather was the main cause of the accident.

The crossing where the accident occurred was closed permanently shortly after. The accident led to the fronts of the new Sprinter New Generation trains of NS being re-painted from dark blue to a brighter yellow to increase the visibility of the trains. Additional safety measures were taken at 28 passive railway crossings. The driver of the tractor was put on trial with community service being demanded, but the court did not find him negligent.

== Background ==
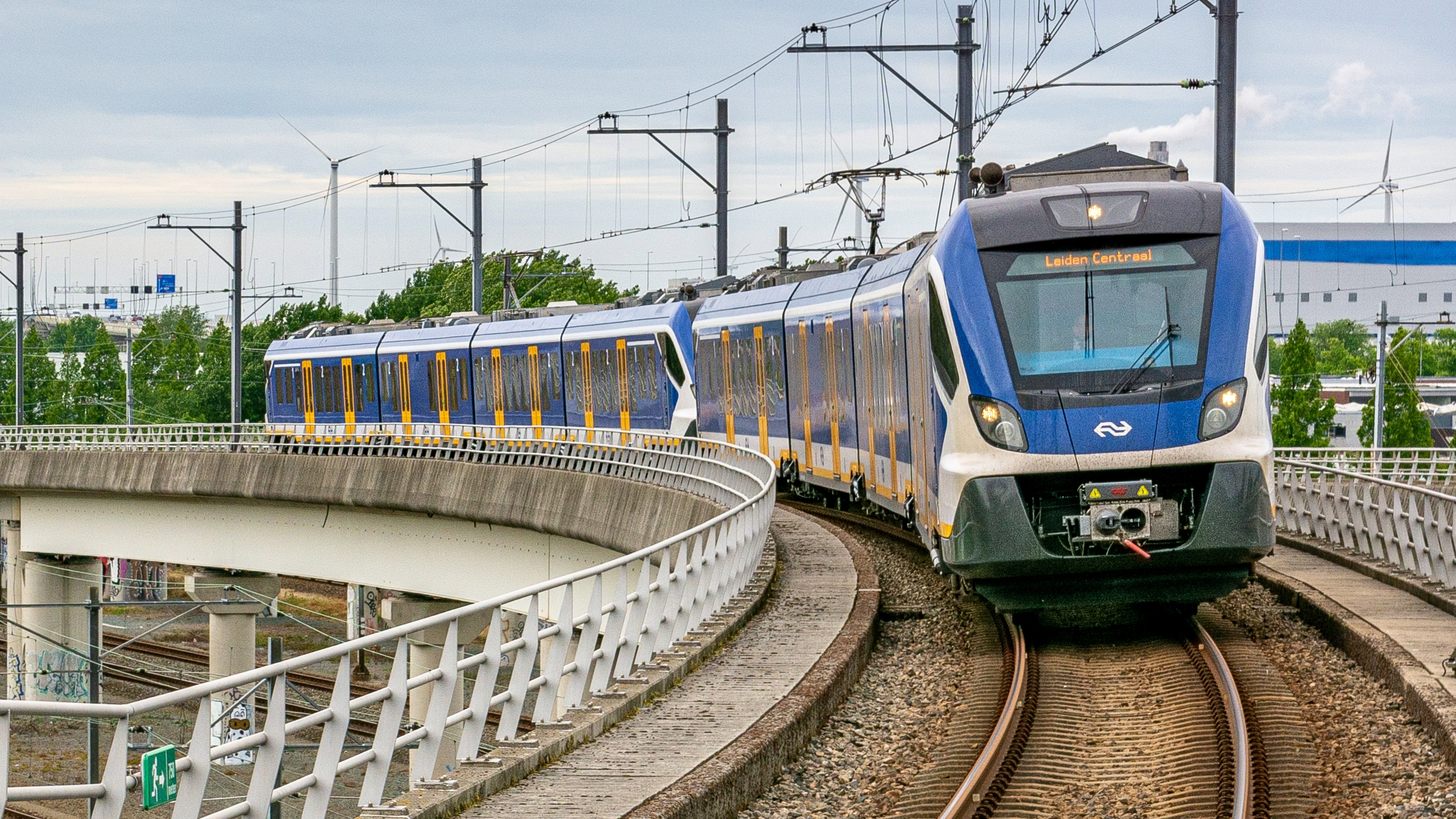
A Sprinter New Generation train in 2019

The Netherlands had 277 passive railway crossings (Dutch: Niet Actief Beveiligde Overwegen, or simply NABO) in 2018. NABOs do not have closing barriers and are mostly used in rural areas where there are fewer people. According to ProRail, accidents in these crossings in the Netherlands have been in a decline since the 1990s. An average of two people are killed annually at passive crossings in the country. ProRail started a 5-year program in 2018 to close or upgrade 180 of the passive crossings across the country in order to increase safety around the tracks, including the crossing where the accident occurred. The speed limit in the area is 140 kilometres per hour (87 mph).

The train involved, the Sprinter New Generation (SNG), is based on the Civity platform by Construcciones y Auxiliar de Ferrocarriles. The first SNG sets were introduced to Dutch railways in December 2018, less than 2 years before the accident. These trains have a dark blue and white coloured livery at the front section, together with a large window looking into the driver's cabin. In February 2016, an Arriva train collided with an elevated work platform at an active railway crossing in Dalfsen, Overijssel, which derailed the entire train and killed the train driver. The 2020 collision in Hooghalen has been compared to the 2016 accident in Dalfsen due to the two having many similarities.

== Crash ==
On 22 May 2020 at 15:24 CEST (13:24 UTC), two sets of SNG trains of the Nederlandse Spoorwegen (NS) coupled together departed Zwolle towards Groningen as Sprinter 8149. At 16:00, the train stopped at Beilen railway station and departed around a minute later to Assen railway station. Around the same time, a tractor with a trailer filled with around 18 tonnes (40,000 lb) of sand approached crossing 38.6 of the Meppel–Groningen railway. The tractor driver looked around and proceeded to cross after he did not see a train. The train was going 137 kilometres per hour (85 mph), when the front camera stopped saving footage 345 metres (1,132 ft) away from the crossing, without a sight of the tractor. Nine seconds later, at 16:02:59, the train collided with the trailer, which broke off from the tractor and subsequently slammed into the driver cabin of the train. After 198 metres (650 ft), the trailer box was freed from the cabin and the train was only pulling the chassis and wheels of the trailer. The train came to a stop 327 metres (1,073 ft) after the crossing. The train driver was crushed and killed instantly. His body was removed later in the evening. There were 52 passengers on board the train at the time of the accident. Two passengers and the train conductor were injured, while the driver of the tractor escaped unharmed.

The collision knocked over and damaged several overhead cable poles. Five seconds after the collision, the control center of ProRail monitoring railway infrastructure is alerted that no current is running through two groups of overhead cables near Hooghalen anymore. Current was manually disabled at 16:07 to prevent the cables from coming back online automatically. The employee informed the train dispatcher of the area on the issue, who can see which train is running on the track. At 16:08, the public safety answering points (PSAP) of the NS and ProRail are notified after the train conductor reported a collision. The conductor also said that he could not reach out to the train driver. A minute later, the PSAP of NS called the PSAP of the fire department, who informed the NS that they had already received emergency calls about a collision involving a train. At 16:10, all train services between Beilen and Assen were halted by the dispatcher. The overhead cables were completely shut down at 16:21.

== Investigation ==
The accident was investigated by NS and ProRail. The crossing did meet the Dutch minimum standards, with a fence 11 metres (36 ft) away from the track still allowing for an unobstructed view of trains 500 metres (1,600 ft) away. The tractor driver had already crossed the tracks multiple times on that day, when weather conditions were still good. However, it started to drizzle on the final attempt, which caused low-altitude fog and made seeing the train difficult. It was possible that the driver "did not adapt his actions to the changed circumstances", leading him to still cross the tracks in poor weather. The train driver only saw the tractor 150 metres (490 ft) before the crossing and initiated an emergency brake just three seconds before impact. The tractor driver also attempted to accelerate to get out of the way, without success. The train cabin was not designed to withstand the force of such impact. According to the final report, released in February 2021, lack of visibility in the poor weather is assumed to be the reason as to why the tractor driver did not see the train coming and proceeded to cross the tracks.

=== Trial ===
In November 2022, the public prosecutor demanded a punishment of 180 hours of community service against the tractor driver, as well as a one-year driving ban. The prosecution claimed that the accident was caused by "significant inattentive driving behavior" of the driver, who was calling someone on the phone at the time. It is unclear whether he was actually holding the phone or if it was lying next to him. The driver defended himself by saying that he leaned his head forward because of the drizzle and fog, and looked both ways multiple times without seeing a train. This explanation was found to be sufficient by the judge. The court did not find the driver negligent and did not proceed with the demanded punishment as it was unclear if he was still on his phone while crossing.

== Aftermath ==
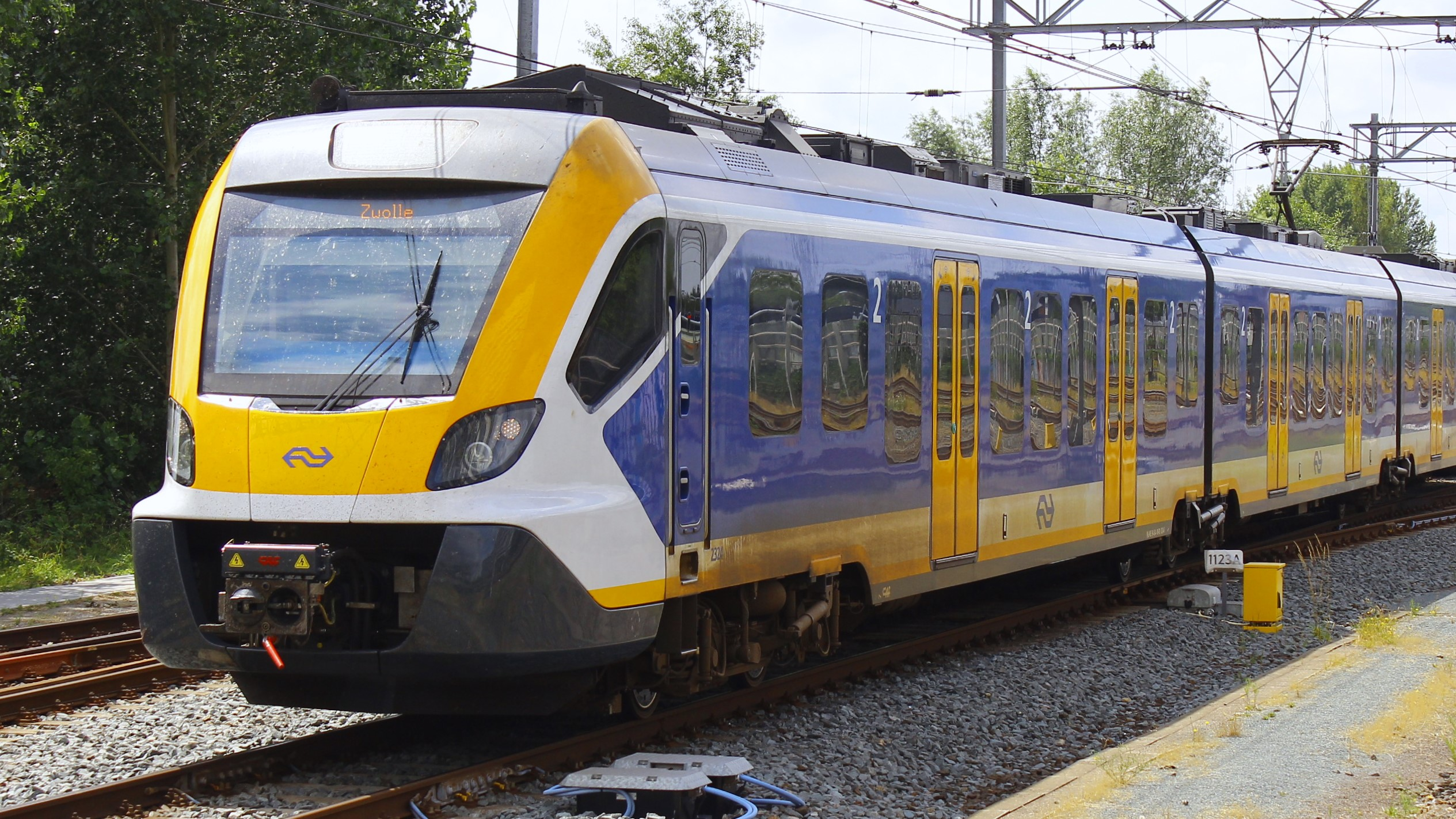
Unit 2324, the rear train set involved in the collision, with a yellow front instead of dark blue

The railway line was closed for three days to allow for the removal of debris and repairs. NS used replacement busses between Beilen and Assen. Three months later, a near-collision occurred at the same railway crossing, which led to its permanent closure. A new path was built to an active crossing instead. Another passive crossing 700 metres (2,300 ft) away was closed within nine months of the collision. Unit 2304, the front train set that impacted the trailer, did not return to service and was scrapped as it was damaged beyond repair.

Following the release of the final report, NS announced that the dark blue fronts of the Sprinter New Generation trains would be repainted to bright yellow to make the train more visible at crossings. The transition to the new colour was near-complete by August 2022, with NS repainting around 150 trains it already had and CAF delivering new trains in that colour. This change was also made to the FLIRT trains of the company later in 2023. New safety measures were taken at 28 passive railway crossings; 20 crossings got a lower speed limit that has to be followed by trains, 7 crossings were closed temporarily, and users of one crossing have to report in advance that they want to cross.

The accident also led to discussions about the extra seat in the cabin of the train, generally used by examiners, which could block the escape path of the train driver. The location of the seat was moved, but to a place where it obstructs the view of the person sitting. Alternative seats such as the ones used on the FLIRT and Sprinter Lighttrain were proposed by the Federation of Dutch Trade Unions, but according to NS these are neither suitable nor allowed in the cabin of the SNG.
