= Oss rail accident =

2018 train collision incident in the Netherlands

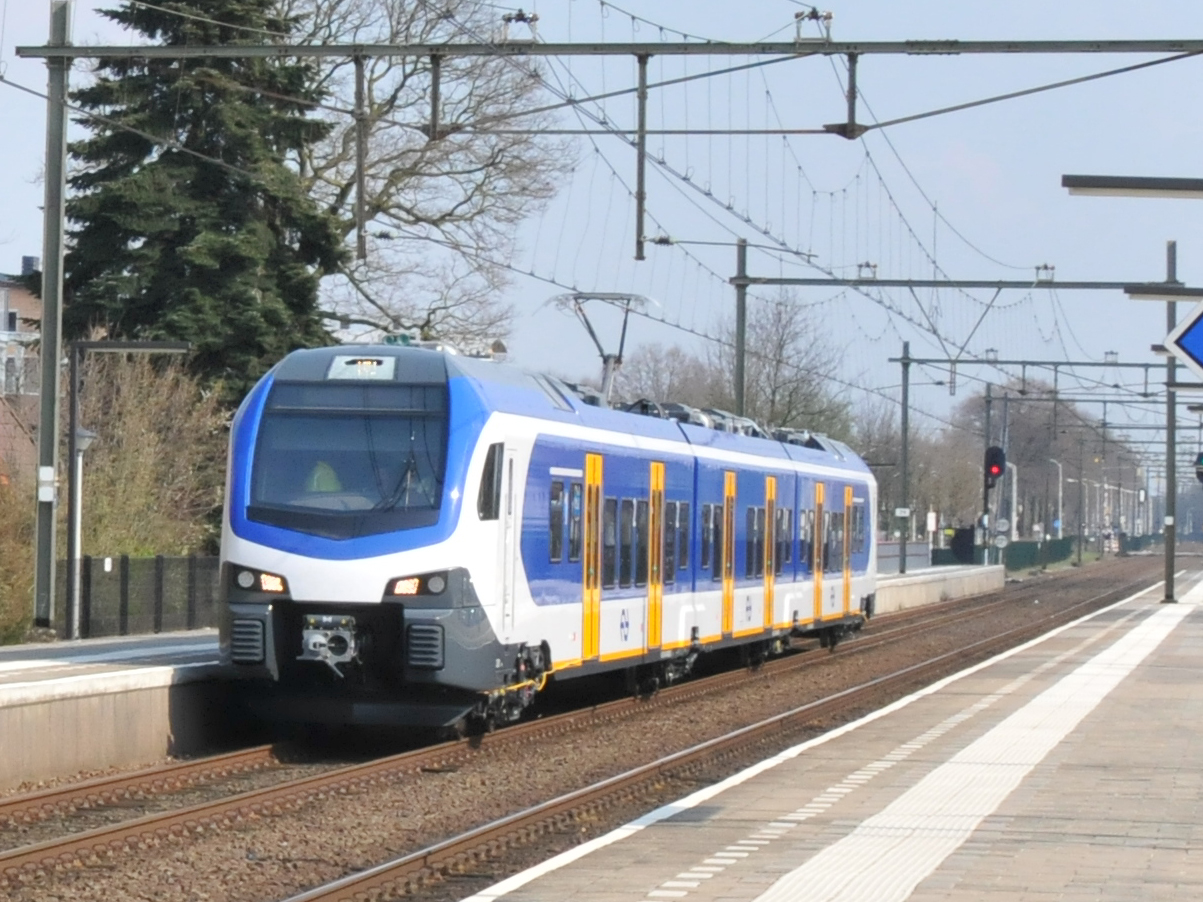
- NS FLIRT train #2201 photographed in 2016

- Location within Netherlands

Details
- Date: 20 September 2018; 08:30 CEST (06:30 UTC)
- Location: Oss, North Brabant
- Coordinates: 51.75859°N 5.50757°E
- Country: Netherlands
- Line: ProRail Tilburg–Nijmegen railway
- Operator: Nederlandse Spoorwegen

Statistics
- Trains: 1
- Deaths: 4
- Injured: 2

The Oss railway accident happened on 20 September 2018 when a passenger train collided with a Stint cart on a level crossing at Oss, North Brabant, Netherlands. Four children on the cart were killed, and two were seriously injured. Stint carts were subsequently banned from use on public roads in the Netherlands. An investigation into the cause of the accident is ongoing.

== Accident ==
On 20 September 2018 a passenger train was involved in a level crossing collision at Oss, near Nijmegen in the Southern part of the Netherlands. Four children were killed, with two further serious injuries; one a child and one adult.

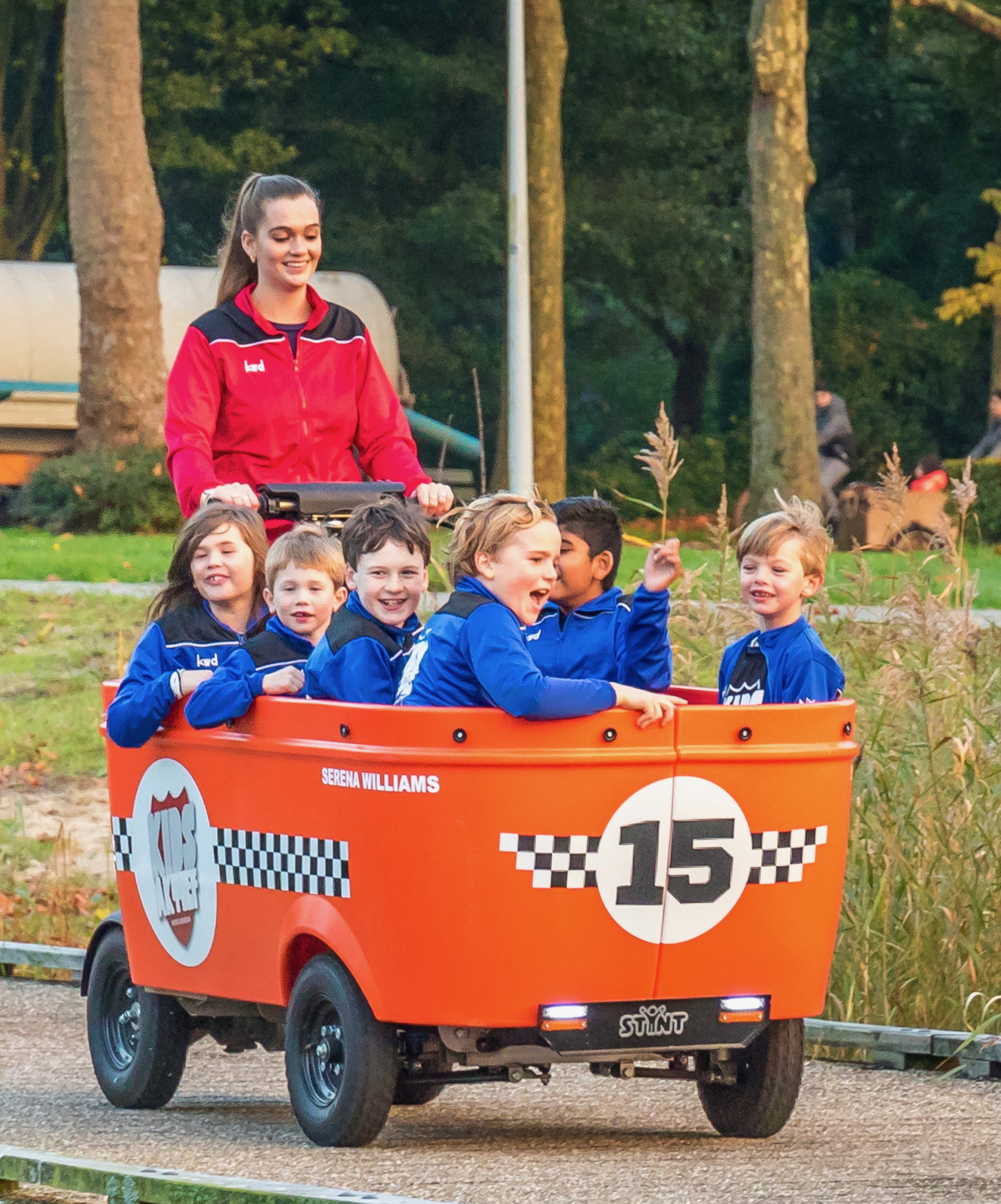
Stint child transport and operator stand

The infrastructure operator of the rail line, ProRail, started an investigation into the accident. The children involved had been travelling to school in a Stint cargo bike-style electrically-powered cart. Initial reports from the scene reported that the barriers and level crossing lights were working correctly.

The Braakstraat level crossing at Oss West railway station has been the location of six accidents since 1975. The seven-car Stadler FLIRT train was operating passenger service 6722 which had departed from Den Bosch ('s-Hertogenbosch) at 08:12 towards Oss.

== Responses ==
The head of Nederlandse Spoorwegen, CEO Roger van Boxtel travelled back early from the InnoTrans rail exhibition in Berlin.

On 21 September 2018 the child care organisation that operated the Stint temporarily halted the use of the transporters, awaiting the findings of the investigation. Some other child care organisations in the Netherlands also paused the use of Stint transporters.

On 1 October, Minister for Infrastructure and Water Management Cora van Nieuwenhuizen banned Stint vehicles from public roads in the Netherlands, a move described as unjustified by Edwin Renzen, owner of Stint Urban Mobility. On 29 October, Stint Urban Mobility filed for bankruptcy.

== Investigation ==
Oss West station and the train were both fitted with closed-circuit television cameras, enabling this footage to be used during the investigation. On 23 September 2018, De Telegraaf reported that the investigation included the possibility of electromagnetic interference from the level crossing equipment affecting the electrical control system of the Stint. In July 2019, it was reported that the driver of the Stint cart had been found not to have been at fault.

== Prosecution ==
In August 2023, the Dutch Public Prosecution Service announced that two companies and two executives were to be prosecuted. They face several charges, amongst them forging documents stating that the Stints were safe.

== See also ==
- List of rail accidents in the Netherlands
