= Dalfsen railway station =

Railway station in the Netherlands

Dalfsen
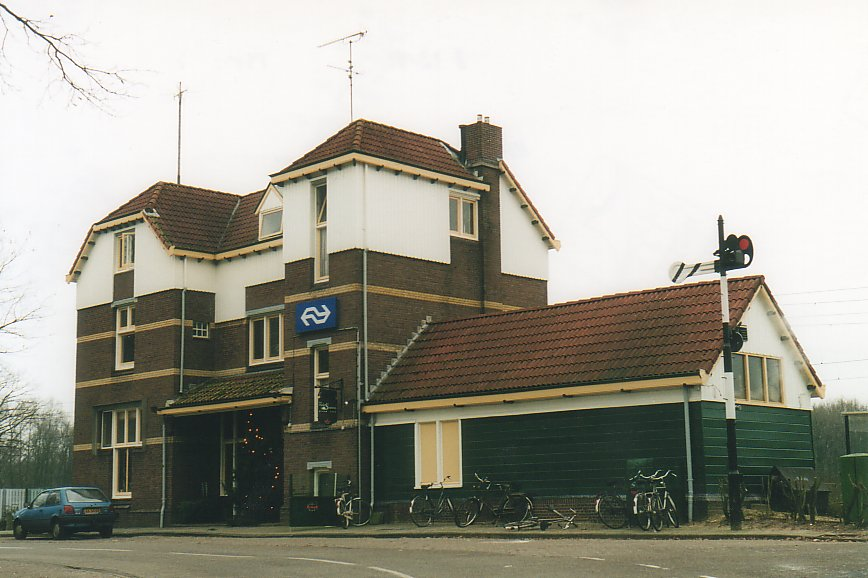

General information
- Location: Netherlands
- Coordinates: 52°29′53″N 6°15′31″E
- Line: Zwolle–Emmen railway

Services
Preceding station	Arriva Netherlands	Following station
Zwolle Terminus	Sneltrein 3800	Ommen towards Emmen
Zwolle Terminus	Sneltrein 13800 Peak hours only	Ommen towards Emmen
Zwolle Terminus	Stoptrein 8000	Ommen towards Emmen
Location
- Location within Netherlands

Dalfsen is a railway station located in Dalfsen, Netherlands. The station was opened on 15 January 1903 and is located on the Zwolle–Emmen railway. Train services are operated by Arriva. The station is situated south of the river Vecht. Dalfsen is on the north bank of the river.

Previously, this station was called Dalfsen dorp (1903-1904), to differentiate it from another station called Dalfsen on the nearby Zwolle-Meppel railway line. On 1 November 1904, that station was renamed Berkum. Subsequently, this station was renamed Dalfsen.

== Train services ==
Route	Service type	Operator	Notes
Zwolle - Ommen - Mariënberg - Hardenberg - Coevorden - Emmen	Local ("Stoptrein")	Arriva	1x per hour
Zwolle - Ommen - Mariënberg - Hardenberg - Coevorden - Emmen	Express ("Sneltrein")	Arriva	1x per hour
Zwolle - Hardenberg - Coevorden	Express ("Sneltrein")	Arriva	1x per hour - rush hours only. Skips Mariënberg, even though it's an express station.

== Platforms ==
- 1 - Emmen
- 2 - Zwolle

== Bus services ==
Line	Route	Operator	Notes
162	Raalte - Lemelerveld - Dalfsen	Syntus Overijssel	Mon-Fri during daytime hours only.
167	Ommen - Varsen - Oudleusen - Dalfsen - Emmen - Hoonhorst - Wijthmen - Zwolle	Syntus Overijssel	Mon-Fri during daytime hours only.
568	Dalfsen - Rechteren - Hessum - Vilsteren - Dalmsholte - Lemele - Nieuwe Brug - Ommen	Syntus Overijssel	Mon-Fri during daytime hours only, 1x per 90 min.
591	Dalfsen - Oudleusen - Nieuwleusen	Syntus Overijssel	Mon-Sat during daytime hours only.

== Accidents and incidents ==
- On 23 February 2016, a passenger train collided with a crane on the line near Dalfsen. Two people died.
