= Dalfsen train crash =

2016 level crossing collision in the Netherlands

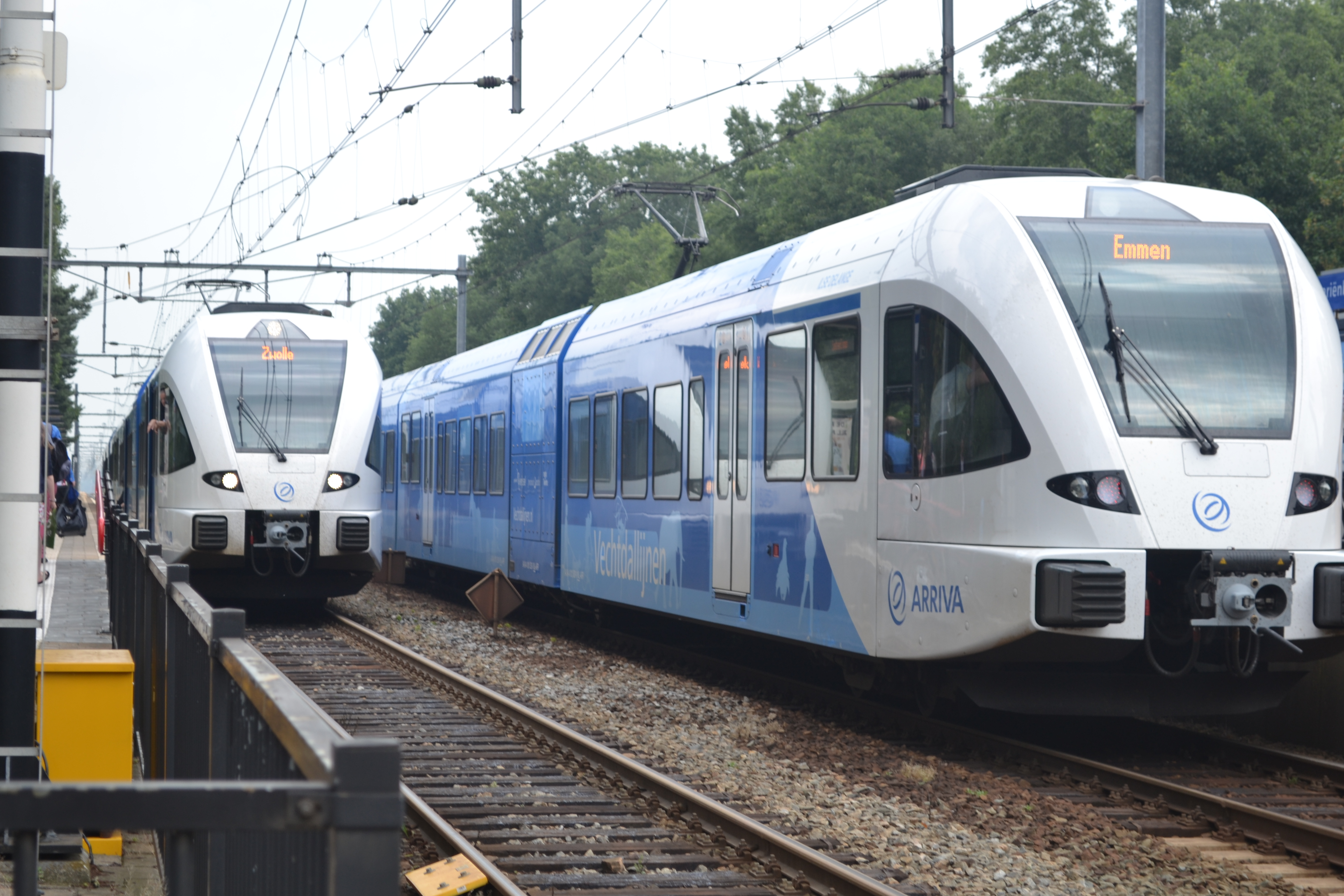
- The Spurt train pictured on the right was involved in the accident.

- Location within Netherlands

Details
- Date: 23 February 2016; 08:50 CET
- Location: Dalfsen, Overijssel
- Coordinates: 52°30′07″N 6°19′28″E
- Country: Netherlands
- Line: Zwolle–Stadskanaal railway
- Operator: Arriva
- Incident type: Obstruction on line
- Cause: Vehicle obstructing line at level crossing Operator unable to ascertain whether or not it was safe to cross

Statistics
- Trains: 1
- Passengers: 15
- Deaths: 1
- Injured: 6

The Dalfsen train crash occurred on 23 February 2016 when a passenger train collided with a tracked elevated work platform on a level crossing at Dalfsen, Overijssel, Netherlands. One person was killed and six were injured, one seriously.

== Accident ==
At 08:50 CET (07:50 UTC), a passenger train collided with an elevated work platform at Dalfsen, Overijssel, Netherlands. The crane, from company Van den Brink in Barneveld, was being driven slowly across the single-track line when it was hit by the train. Its driver had waited at the crossing while a westbound train passed, but then started to cross and was hit by an eastbound train. The train involved was a Spurt GTW 2/8 train, travelling from Zwolle to Coevorden. All four vehicles were derailed. At the time of the crash, the train had fifteen passengers on board. One person, the driver of the train, was killed. Six were injured, with one person sustaining serious injuries.

Two of the injured were taken to hospital in Zwolle. They were the train's conductor and a female passenger. The other four were treated at the scene. Twelve ambulances were sent to the scene. An air ambulance from the University Medical Center Groningen attended.

The Grove MZ 90 CR elevated work platform weighed 20 tonnes. Equipped with caterpillar tracks, it had a top speed of approximately 1 kilometre per hour (0.62 mph). The platform had been parked on the south side of the railway line, and was to be driven to a point north of the railway where it was to be loaded onto a lorry. The operator waited until a train had passed before he started to cross, believing he had sufficient time to do so. Unknown to the operator, the next train was due in six minutes; the operator assumed he had approximately ten minutes. Unlike those in the United Kingdom, level crossings in the Netherlands provide no guidance for operators of large and/or slow vehicles, nor was a telephone link to a signalman provided. Thus the platform operator had no way of ascertaining that it was safe to cross.

Whilst he was crossing, he saw the train approaching and attempted to attract the attention of the train driver as he continued to cross in an attempt to clear the crossing before the train arrived. The train driver would only have realised that the crossing was obstructed at a distance of 175 metres (191 yd), but the train would have required a distance of 800 metres (870 yd) to stop at the speed it was travelling at (140 kilometres per hour (87 mph)). The driver activated the emergency brakes within a second of seeing the obstruction, slowing the train to 107 kilometres per hour (66 mph) at the point of impact. The platform was pushed 15 metres (16 yd) along the line until it collided with a pole supporting the overhead line. The impact caused the platform to break into its three main parts and lifted the front of the train, which derailed, stopping a further 150 metres (160 yd) further along the line. The cab of the train was destroyed, killing the driver. The platform operator jumped from the vehicle shortly before the collision, sustaining minor injuries.

It was initially expected that the line between Zwolle and Ommen would be closed for at least three days. Arriva instigated a bus replacement service between those stations.

Work to remove the train took place over the night of 23–24 February, with the first carriage being removed during the night. Once the train has been removed, repairs were made to the track and catenary, 180 metres (200 yd) of which were affected. The damaged carriages were taken to a depot in Meppel. Following repairs, the line was reopened in the evening of 27 February.

== Investigations ==
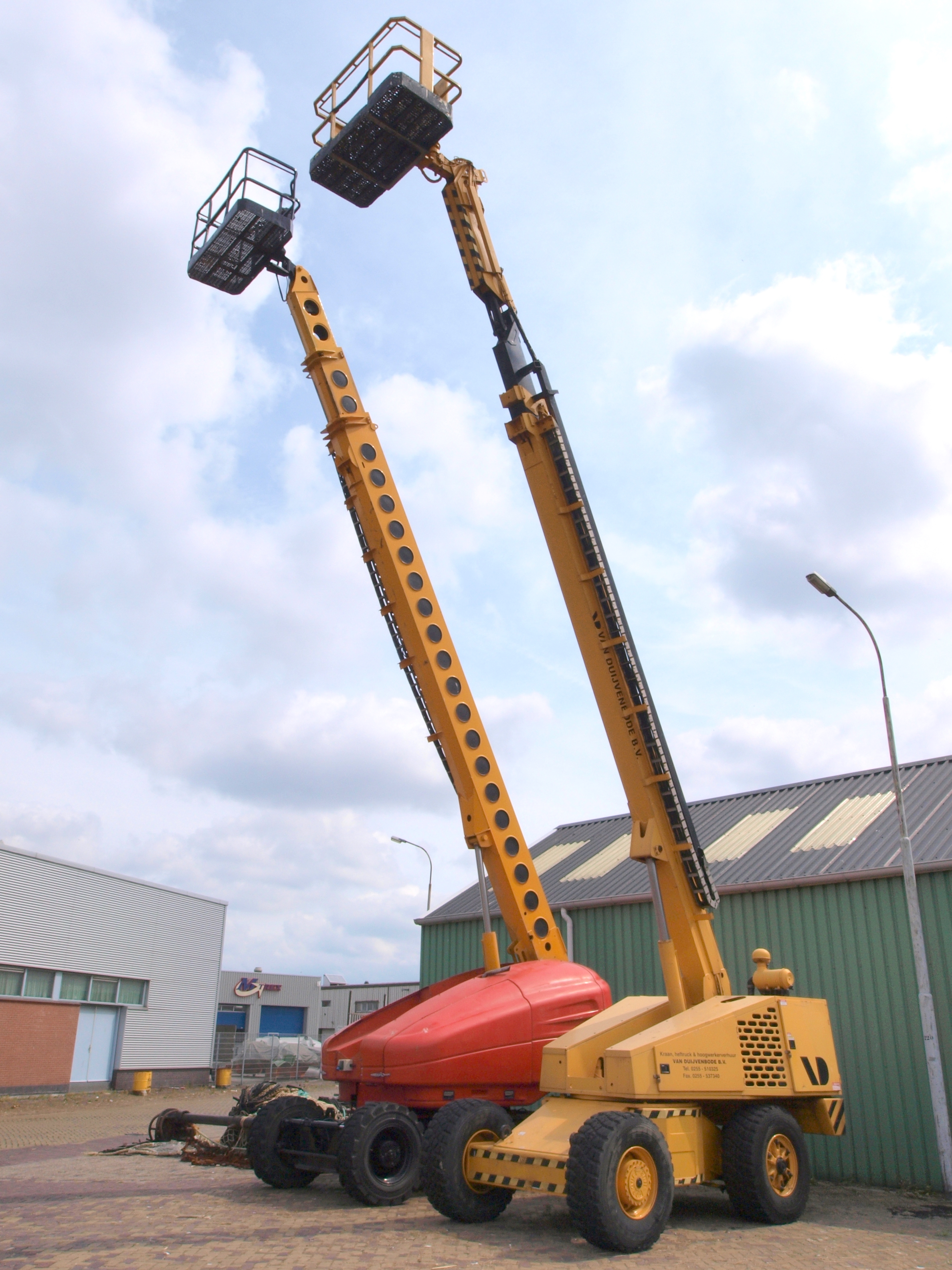
Elevated platforms similar to the one involved in the crash

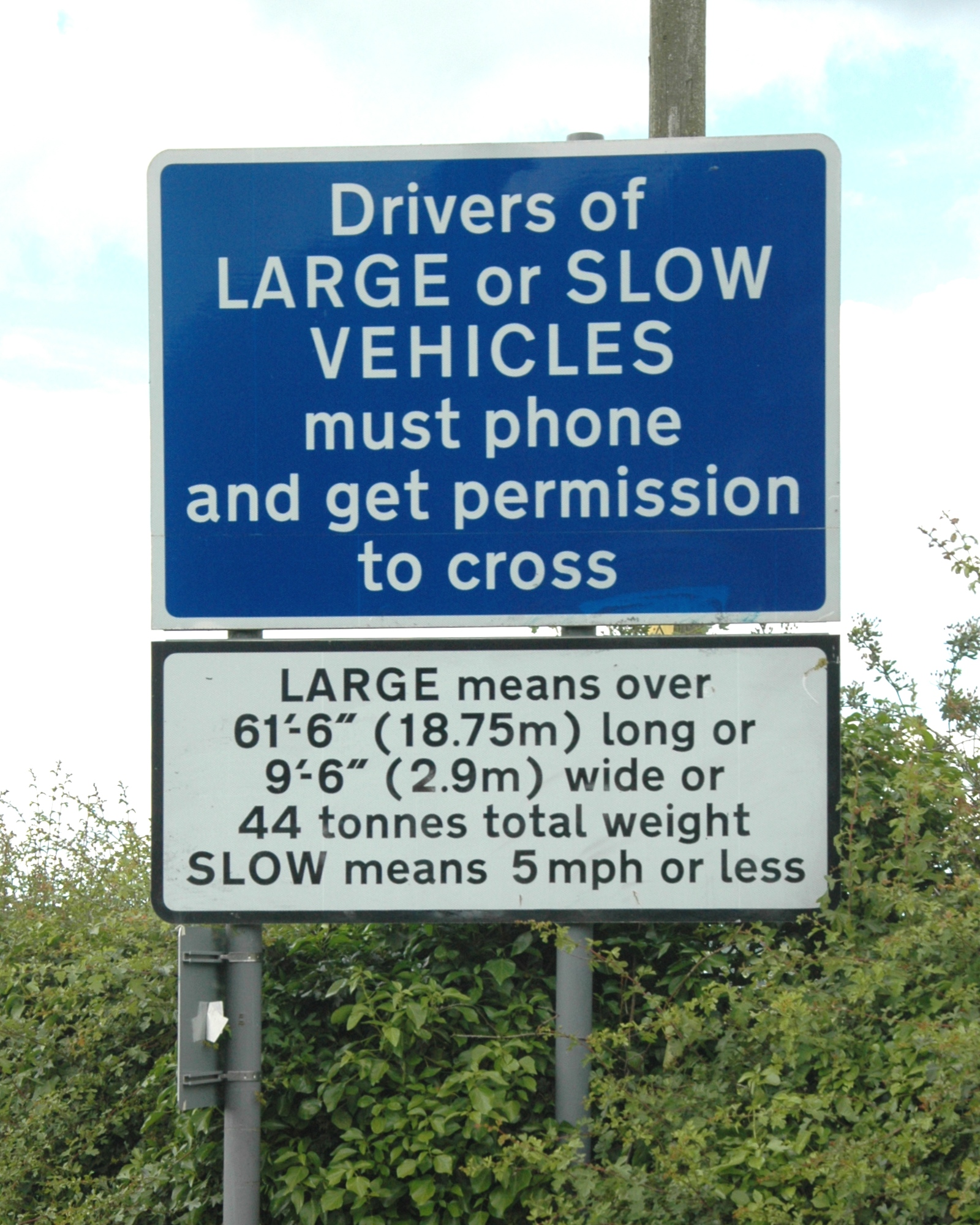
Level crossings in the Netherlands are not provided with a means for drivers of large and/or slow vehicles to contact the signalman, whereas those in the United Kingdom are.

The Dutch Safety Board (Dutch: Onderzoeksraad Voor Veiligheid, OVV) are responsible for investigating railway accidents in the Netherlands. An investigation was opened into the accident. The OVV published its final report into the accident in December 2016.

The investigation found that the cause of the crash was that the elevated work platform obstructed the line, but that there was no mechanism in place to allow the operator of the vehicle to ascertain whether or not it was safe to cross. Six recommendations were made. The impact forces sustained by the cab of the train were four times higher than those it was designed to withstand, which is why the cab was destroyed in the accident. The driver had insufficient time available to avoid the accident or retreat from the cab to a survival space within the train. Following the accident, vehicles with steel caterpillar tracks were prohibited from using level crossings in the Netherlands. One of the recommendations was that ProRail should look at the issue of drivers of large/slow vehicles being able to ascertain whether or not it was safe to cross a level crossing. ProRail has responded by stating that it is "embracing" the recommendations.

Currently (2025), the regulations concerning slow vehicles dictate that any vehicle or other transport that cannot completely cross the level crossing within 15 seconds (12 seconds for crossings without active warning signals) isn't allowed to cross, except with prior permission from ProRail, which must be requested at least five working days in advance. It's recommended to avoid such crossings whenever possible.

The Dutch police opened a separate investigation into the accident. The elevated work platform driver was detained for questioning. He could have faced charges of causing death by negligence, causing a fatal traffic collision and causing danger on the railway. In September 2017, the driver was charged with causing a traffic accident resulting in death and injury.

== See also ==
- Hixon rail crash in Britain,1968.
