= 1976 Schiedam train accident =

1976 train accident in the Netherlands

Coordinates: 51.92655°N 4.39657°E

Schiedam train disaster
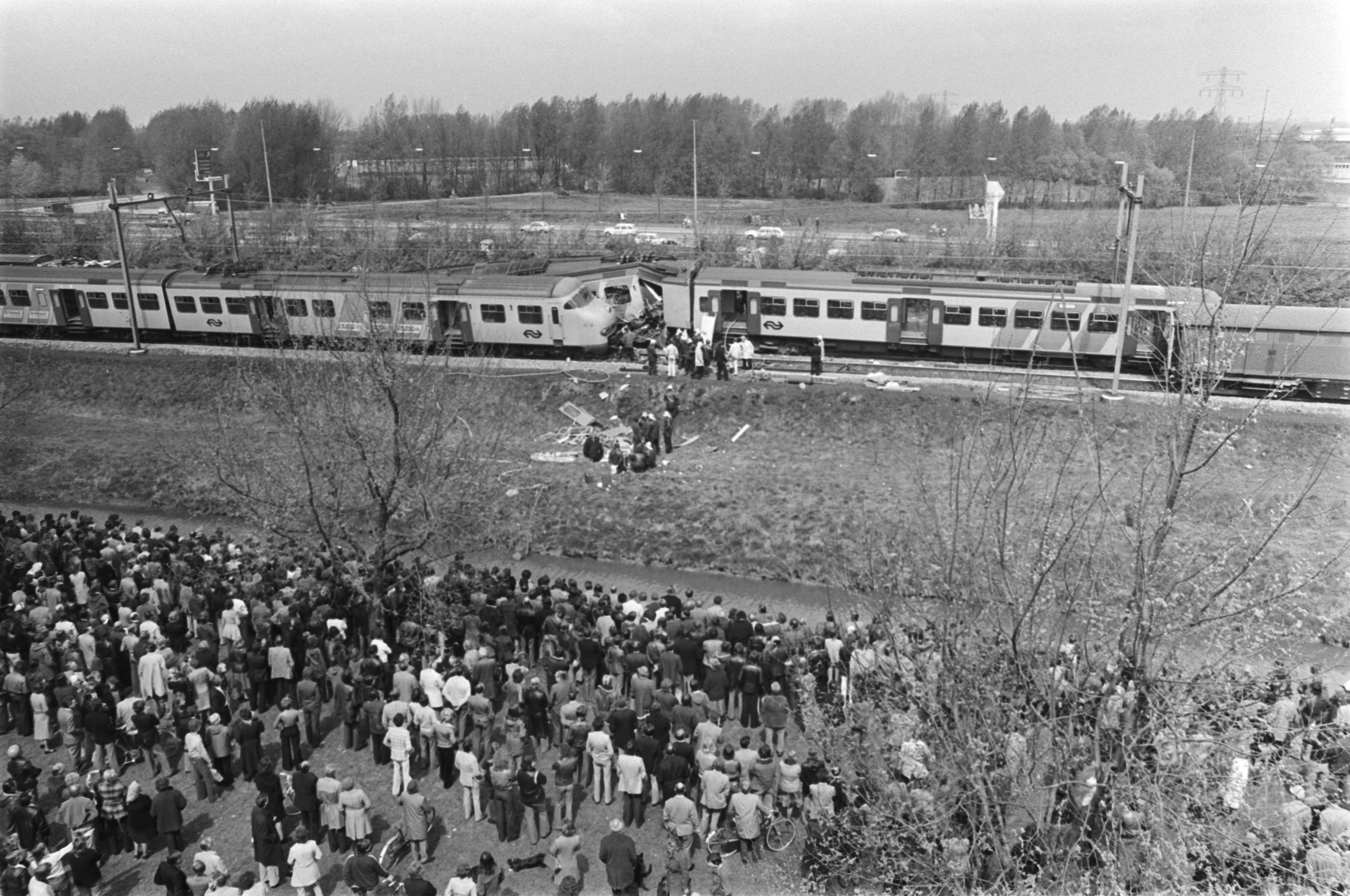
- A Stoptrein collided with an international D-train on the morning of 4 May 1976 near Schiedam

Details
- Date: 4 May 1976; 7.54 (CET)
- Location: Near Schiedam
- Country: Netherlands
- Line: Hoekse Lijn
- Operator: Nederlandse Spoorwegen
- Cause: Error by the chief conductor and the driver of Stoptrein 4116, lack of ATB

Statistics
- Trains: D215 Rhine Express boat train Stoptrein 4116
- Deaths: 24
- Injured: several tens, 5 severe

The Schiedam train disaster took place in the Netherlands on 4 May 1976 near the station Schiedam Rotterdam-West. The international Rhine Express boat train (D-train D215) from Hook of Holland, which left for Munich and was hauled by NS Class 1300 electric locomotive no. 1311 Best collided with a train of the then new sprinter type, (trainset 2008 of Stoptrein 4116) coming from Rotterdam. The collision caused the deaths of 24 people (in the forward carriage of the 2008), five people were severely injured and dozens more had minor injuries.

The disaster was the second major train crash near Schiedam, following the first major train accident in the Netherlands, which happened on 10 August 1856 and caused three deaths.
