= Ommen railway station =

Railway station in the Netherlands

Ommen
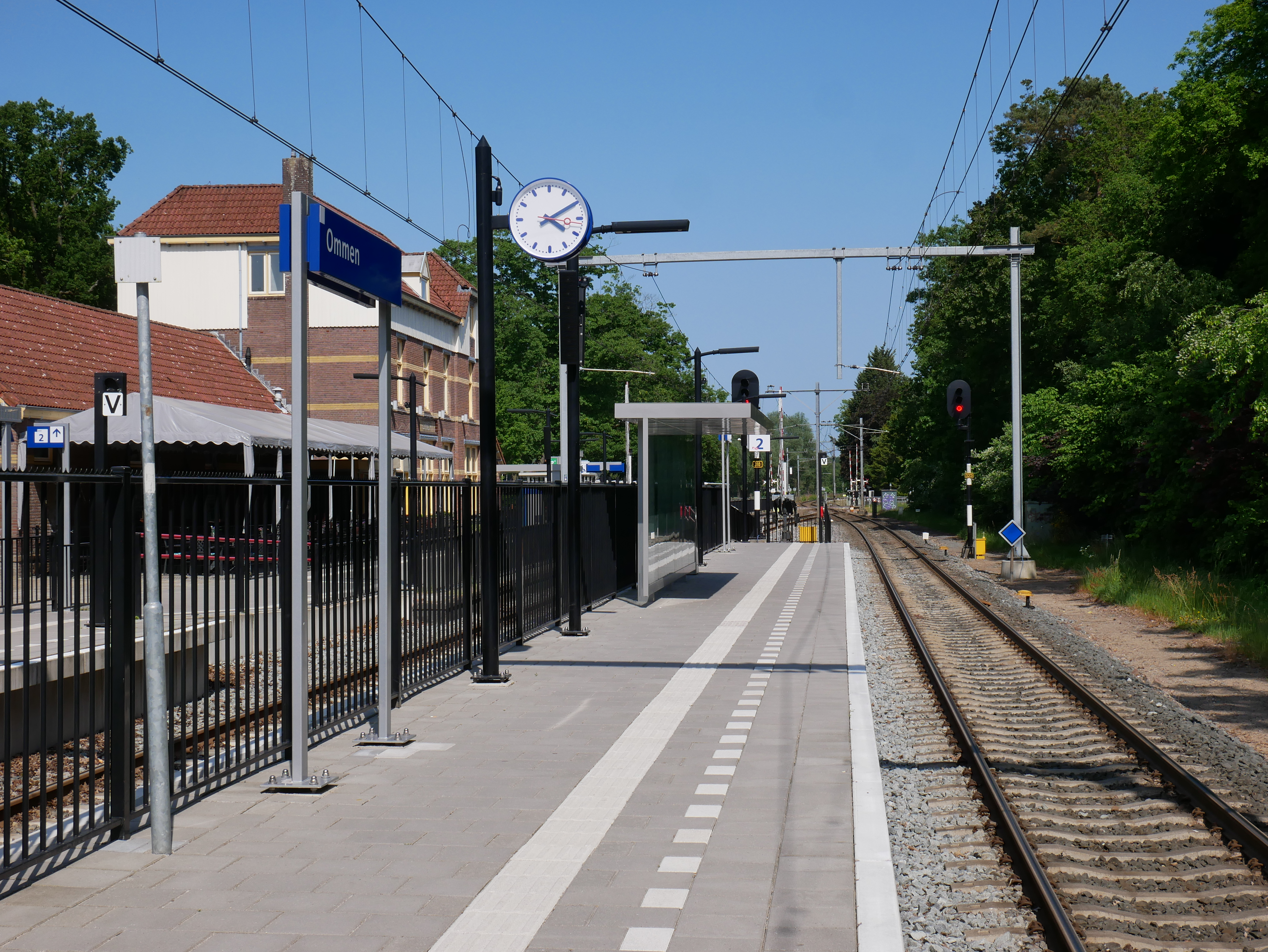

General information
- Location: Netherlands
- Coordinates: 52°30′34″N 6°25′01″E
- Line: Zwolle–Emmen railway

Services
| Preceding station | Arriva Netherlands | Following station |
|---|---|---|
| Dalfsen towards Zwolle | Sneltrein 3800 | Mariënberg towards Emmen |
| Dalfsen towards Zwolle | Stoptrein 8000 | Mariënberg towards Emmen |
| Dalfsen towards Zwolle | Sneltrein 13800 Peak hours only | Hardenberg towards Emmen |
Location
- Location within Netherlands

Ommen is a railway station at Ommen, Netherlands. The station is located 1 km south of the town center. The station was opened on 15 January 1903 and is located on the Zwolle–Emmen railway. Train services are operated by Arriva.

Previously, it was also the terminus of the Deventer-Ommen railway (1910–1935).

== Train services ==
| Route | Service type | Operator | Notes |
|---|---|---|---|
| Zwolle - Ommen - Mariënberg - Hardenberg - Coevorden - Emmen | Local ("Stoptrein") | Arriva | 1x per hour |
| Zwolle - Ommen - Mariënberg - Hardenberg - Coevorden - Emmen | Express ("Sneltrein") | Arriva | 1x per hour |
| Zwolle - Hardenberg - Coevorden | Express ("Sneltrein") | Arriva | 1x per hour - rush hours only. Skips Mariënberg, even though it is an express station. |

== Bus services ==
| Line | Route | Operator | Notes |
|---|---|---|---|
| 31 | Ommen - Witharen - Balkbrug - Linde - Zuidwolde - Ten Arlo - Hoogeveen | Qbuzz | On evenings and Sundays, this bus only operates between Zuidwolde and Hoogeveen. |
| 81 | Ommen - Eerde - Den Ham - Vroomshoop - Westerhaar | Twents | No service after 22:00 and on Sundays. |
| 267 | Zwolle - Dalfsen - Ankum - Oudleusen - Varsen - Ommen | Syntus Overijssel | Only 3 runs during morning rush hour and 4 during the afternoon rush hour. During school breaks, there's only 1 run during both rush hours. |
| 568 | Dalfsen - Rechteren - Hessum - Vilsteren - Dalmsholte - Lemele - Nieuwe Brug - Ommen | Syntus Overijssel | Mon-Fri during daytime hours only, 1x per 90 min. |
