= Automatische Treinbeïnvloeding =

Dutch system of automatic train protection

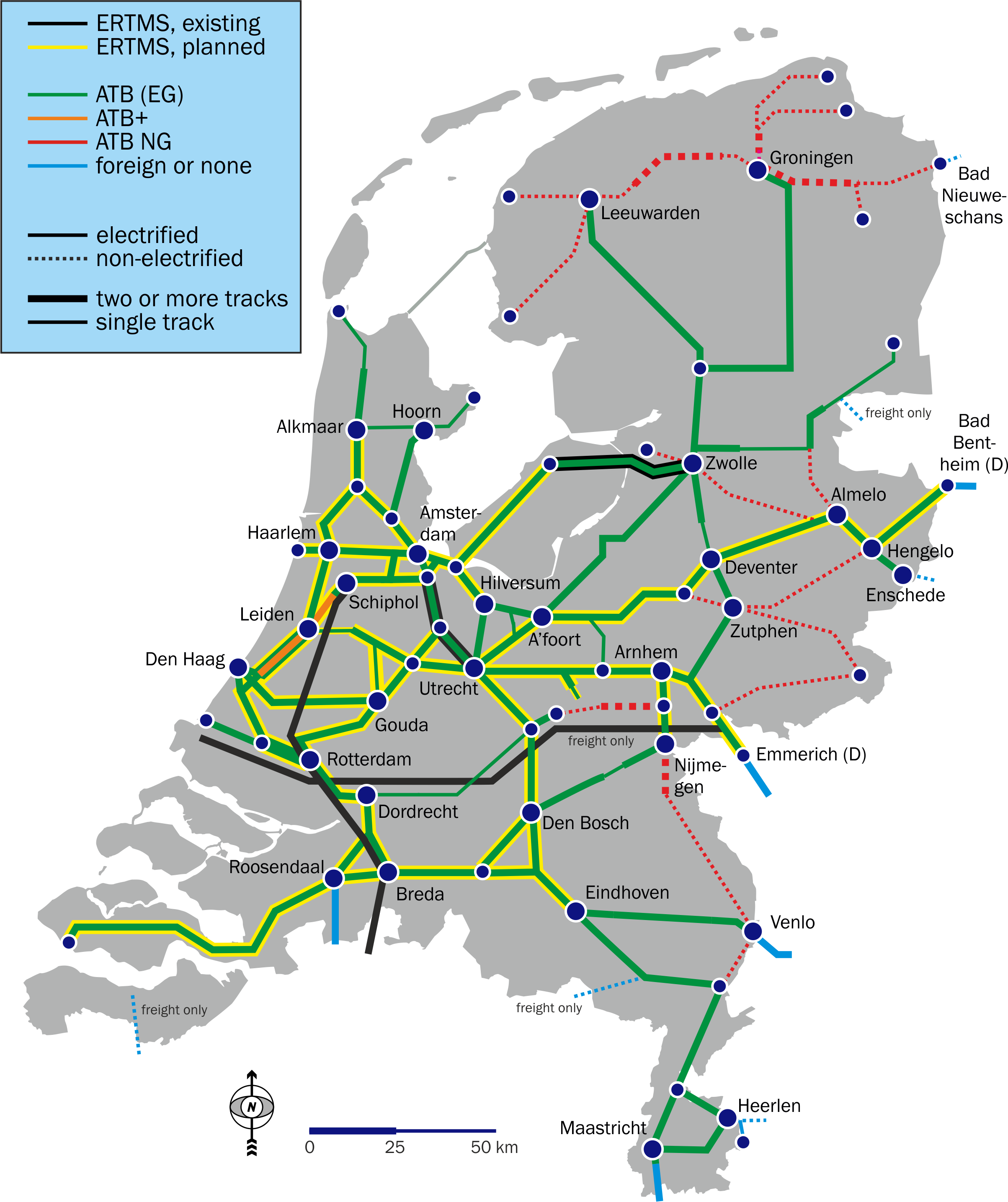
Map of ATB and other safety systems in the Netherlands, including planned ERTMS implementation.

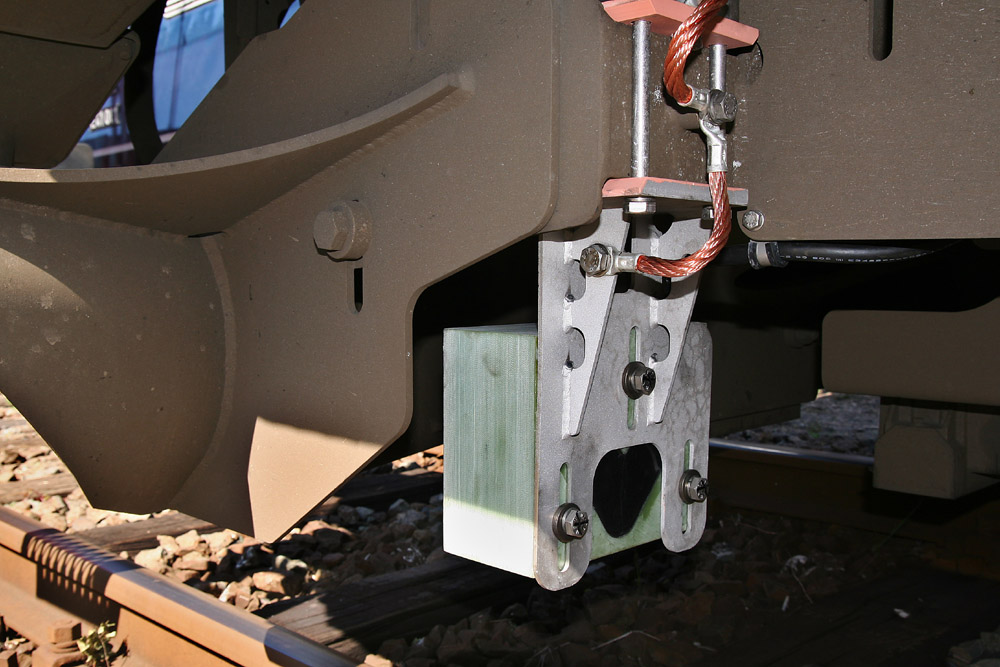
Equipment for the ATB on a DB class 189 locomotive

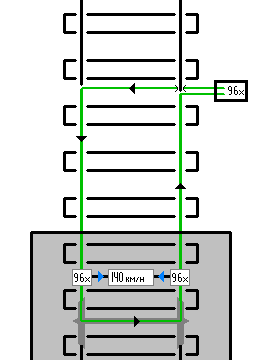
The 96 pulses per minute in the track circuit are interpreted by the onboard ATB-equipment as a 140 km/h speed limit

Automatische Treinbeïnvloeding or ATB ('automatic train control') is a Dutch train protection system first developed in the 1950s. Its installation was spurred by the Harmelen train disaster of 1962.

ATB operates by the train collecting electrical signals from line-side apparatus and will override the driver's controls in the following situations:

- a) failure to reduce speed at a caution signal (ATB will slow the train sufficiently to stop at the next signal).
- b) failure to observe speed limit (ATB makes an immediate emergency brake application)

== ATB-EG ==
ATB-EG (ATB Eerste Generatie English: ATB First Generation) is based on the American Pulse Code Cab Signaling system. It is installed on all major Dutch rail lines.

=== Technical overview ===
ATB-EG controls 5 speeds: 40 km/h, 60 km/h, 80 km/h, 130 km/h and 140 km/h. Just like Pulse Code Cab Signaling the system works by sending pulses along the AC track circuit. When the circuit is closed by the train's front wheels an electromagnetic field is created with each pulse. These fields electromagnetically energise two coils in front of the leading axle which feed the pulses to the ATB-system. The onboard ATB system works out the amount of pulses per minutes and translates this to the 5 codes Yellow, Yellow6, Yellow8, Yellow13 and Green with corresponding speeds of 40, 60, 80, 130 and 140 km/h or so-called volle materieelsnelheid (full train speed). If the train's maximum allowed speed is lower (as for instance the SGM), the speed settings above its maximum speed will be omitted.

Code (pulses per minute)	Speed limit	Cab signal
None	40 km/h	
270 (only with Phase 3 equipment)	40 km/h	
220	60 km/h	6
180	80 km/h	8
147 (With Phase 3 equipment or higher)	80 km/h	8
120	130 km/h	13
96	140 km/h	
75	ATB Buiten Dienst (out of order)	BD

=== Operation ===
The speed limit enforced by ATB-EG is presented to the driver by a row of lights, with the current cab signal illuminated, (Mat 64, SLT, PROTOS and THALYS) which can be integrated into speedometer (ICM and SGM) or either a red needle (VIRM, DDAR and Class 1700) or yellow LED (FLIRT and GTW) on the outside of the speedometer. The driver will be informed of a speed change with a short "ding". If the driver exceeds the current ATB-speed by 5 km/h a bell will start to ring continuously. If the driver does not brake within 3 seconds the ATB will initiate an emergency brake application.

When a stretch of track has an ATB code for a lower speed, due to a lower track speed or a diverging switch etc., the section before it will carry that code as well. A signal or sign guarding the first section will inform the driver of the oncoming speed reduction and upon entering that block the ATB will change to the target speed. According to the ATB the train is now overspeeding so it will initiate the continuous bell, informing the driver that they need to start braking. Once again, if the driver does not brake within 3 seconds the ATB will initiate an emergency brake application. The system will stop the warning once the driver is braking sufficiently, this is checked by means of the so-called remcriterium (English: brake criterion). The remcriterium is based on either the brake pipe pressure, brake cylinder pressure or the position of the brake lever. This should ensure the train reaches the target speed before the next block, but it often proves inadequate. When the train is within the 5 km/h margin of the target speed the system rings three short bells, informing the driver that they are allowed to stop braking.

=== Failsafe ===
After passing a red signal and entering a section already occupied by another train, the track circuit is already shorted by the other train preventing the signal from reaching the train passing the red signal. Therefore, the absence of a signal is interpreted as the most restrictive signal, making the system fail-safe. To allow driving on sight onto occupied track, which cannot be discerned from passing a red signal using a system like this, receiving no signal was chosen to be interpreted as a speed limit of 40 km/h.

=== Design limitations ===
ATB-EG has a number of drawbacks when compared to modern systems like ETCS

1. ATB-EG does not enforce speeds below 40 km/h.
2. The system only has 5 speed settings, leaving room for overspeeding.
3. ATB-EG does not allow speeds above 140 km/h while there are lines designed with a higher speed limit.
4. The braking power enforced by ATB-EG often proves insufficient.
5. Rails are also used as return for the catenary, it is therefore possible for electric trains to interfere with the ATB signal.
6. ATB EG will only work with good contact between the rails and train wheels.

One of the early system's design limitations was the inability to enforce speeds below 40 km/h. Several accidents at train stations and railroad yards occurred because the driver failed to stop at a red signal and ATB did not intervene, as it had already enforced a speed below 40 km/h. Strange as this limitation may seem, there was a reason for it. The main purpose of ATB was to prevent overspeeding and failing to respond to yellow signals, at the time it was deemed unlikely a driver would miss a red signal when traveling below 40 km/h and expecting one. It is seen as a problem now as numerous accidents have occurred and safety regulations became stricter over time.

The gaps between each speed setting form a problem. If there is no matching speed setting for the current speed limit, the next speed setting above it will be enforced. The biggest gap falls between 80 and 130 km/h, meaning ATB EG will allow a train to drive 130 km/h in a 90 km/h zone.

Another drawback is the maximum speed being set to 140 km/h. Tracks with a design speed of up to 160 km/h cannot be used up to full speed because ATB-EG does not allow this. This is becoming more of an issue with the ever-growing rail traffic. ATBM+ has later been developed to raise this speed to 160 km/h.

Vossloh G2000 locomotives equipped with ATB EG suffer from some unwanted emergency brake applications. This is because the brake pipe pressure, on which the brake criterion is based, takes 4 to 5 seconds to drop, while the ATB intervenes in 3 seconds.
FLIRT trains have the same problem as the G2000 locomotives, because their brake criterion is based on the brake cylinder pressure. Additionally the brake criterion can "vanish" when the anti-lock braking system engages, because the system could reduce the brake pressure below the point to comply with the brake criterion. This will also result in an emergency brake application.

=== Enhancements ===
Over the years multiple enhancements were introduced to overcome some of the system's flaws.

ATBM+ is designed to raise the maximum speed from 140 to 160 km/h. This system is only installed on line between Hoofddorp and Den Haag Mariahoeve and is currently solely used by Thalys trains

ATB-Plus-Plus is designed to reduce "Stoptonend Sein (STS)-passages" (English: Signals Passed At Danger) by applying an emergency brake after passing a signal at danger. It compensates the original design flaws in speeds below 40 km/h where no forced braking was possible in case of passing stop signals.

ATB-Vv (Verbeterde versie English: Improved version) is the latest evolution of ATB-Plus-Plus. It is enhanced with three beacons in distance of 120, 30 and 3 m before the attributed signal, using technology comparable with German PZB. After activation by ATB-Vv the movement of the train is self-controlled with regard to the braking curve. So the chance of a "Stoptonend Sein (STS)-passages" (English: Signals Passed At Danger) is minimal. The system is not fail-safe as a broken beacon will result in the train not braking automatically.

== ATB-NG ==
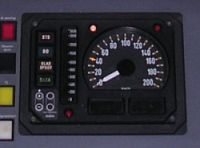
An ATB-NG DMI/speedometer

Since 1990 a second generation, ATB-NG (ATB Nieuwe Generatie English: ATB New Generation), has been developed to overcome all the problems posed by ATB-EG. The systems is completely different from ATB-EG and operates nearly equal to ETCS Level 1, ATB-EG and ATB-NG can both can safely be installed at the same track as they do not interfere with each other. Trainborne ATB-NG equipment is also able to receive ATB-EG signals, making the system backwards compatible. Because major, electrified routes received priority when installing ATB-EG, ATB-NG is almost exclusively found on diesel-lines as these were the only unprotected routes when the system came out. One exception is the former diesel line between Zwolle and Wierden which was electrified between 2016 and 2017.

=== Operation ===
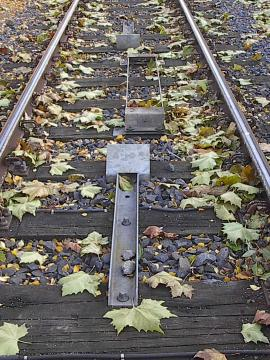
An ATB-NG beacon viewed against the direction of travel

The system works by conveying movement authorization via balises between the tracks, called beacons, located next to signals and in other strategic places. These beacons are offset towards the left as seen from the driver, making the system directional. The system manages the maximum speed, maximum travel distance, the exit speed and the "release-speed". Speed limits are set in 10 km/h intervals from 0 through 200 km/h and indicated by a yellow LED next to the maximum speed on the speedometer. If the train exceeds the maximum speed by more than 2,5 km/h the LED will start to flash and from 5 km/h above the maximum speed a bell will ring. If the maximum speed is exceeded by 7,5 km/h the emergency brakes will be applied. Braking is managed by a brake-curve relative to the weight of the train. When the train approaches the point where it needs to start braking, the yellow LED will jump to the target speed and a red LED will light up at the former position. The red LED will steadily decrease towards the target speed, ensuring the driver brakes accordingly. If the train speed exceeds the red LED by 7,5 km/h a brake application is induced. When the train reaches the target speed three short bells will sound, informing the driver that they can stop braking, and the red LED will disappear. The exit speed, which has to be reached when the movement authority ends, is displayed by a dot-matrix below the speedometer. An illuminated bar next to the speedometer shows the remaining distance until this speed has to be reached. When the exit speed is the same as the current speed the bar will remain dark. If the movement authority ends before the next beacon is reached, the train can continue with a specified "release-speed", often 30 km/h, until it receives new authority from the next beacon.

=== Flaws ===
One weakness of the system is wheelslip caused by slippery rails. ATB-NG measures the traveled distance by counting the wheel rotations; therefore, the system will think the train is ahead of its actual position when the wheelspin occurs. This can result in premature brake interventions when approaching a red signal as the system thinks the train has already passed the signal, while it might still be several meters away.

Another problem is the fact that ATB-NG can't react to signal changes. If a red signal clears ATB-NG will still force the train to stop and only let it creep forward until it reaches the next beacon. This issue can however be solved by installing ATB loops which enable the system to pick up signal updates in a stretch of track before the signal.

An issue with the ATB-NG system as a product is the patent held by ACEC-Alstom, which limits other manufacturers to supply the system and the fact that it offers poor interoperability with other systems.

== Implementation ==
The implementation is shown in the map above. Beside intermediately closing of functional gaps, new constructed lines will use European Train Control System (ETCS) as part of the assigned standard ERTMS. ETCS is already in use on Betuweroute line and HSL-Zuid.

== See also ==
- Pulse Code Cab Signaling
- Train stop – protects against signal passing at danger
- Automatic Warning System – protects against a)
- Automatic Train Protection – protects against b)
- Train protection system
