= Wierden railway station =

Railway station in the Netherlands

Wierden
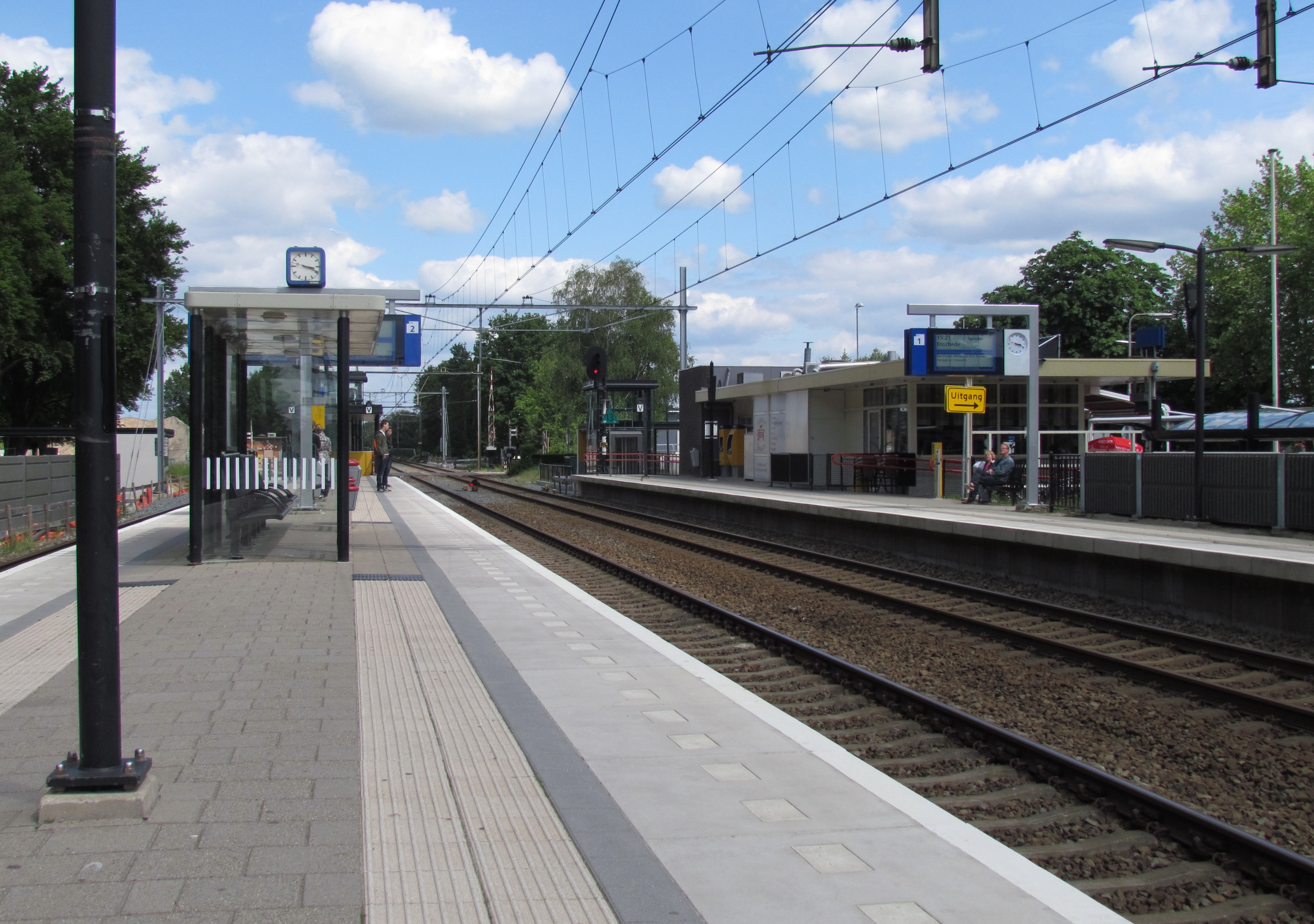

General information
- Location: Netherlands
- Coordinates: 52°21′41″N 6°35′28″E
- Lines: Deventer–Almelo railway Zwolle–Almelo railway

History
- Opened: 1 January 1881

Services
Preceding station	Nederlandse Spoorwegen	Following station
Rijssen towards Apeldoorn	NS Sprinter 7000	Almelo towards Enschede
Preceding station	Keolis Nederland	Following station
Nijverdal towards Zwolle	Sprinter 7900	Almelo towards Enschede
Location
- Location within Netherlands

Wierden is a railway station serving the village Wierden in the Netherlands. The station was opened on 1 January 1881. It is located on the Deventer–Almelo railway and the Zwolle–Almelo railway. The train services are operated by Nederlandse Spoorwegen.

== Train services ==
Route	Service type	Operator	Notes
Apeldoorn - Deventer - Almelo (- Enschede)	Local ("Sprinter")	NS	2x per hour - weekends 1x per hour
Zwolle - Almelo - Hengelo - Enschede	Local ("Stoptrein")	Keolis Nederland	2x per hour

== Bus services ==
There is no bus service at this station. The nearest bus stop is N.H. Kerk, 700m away.
