= Nijverdal West railway station =

Railway station in the Netherlands

Nijverdal West
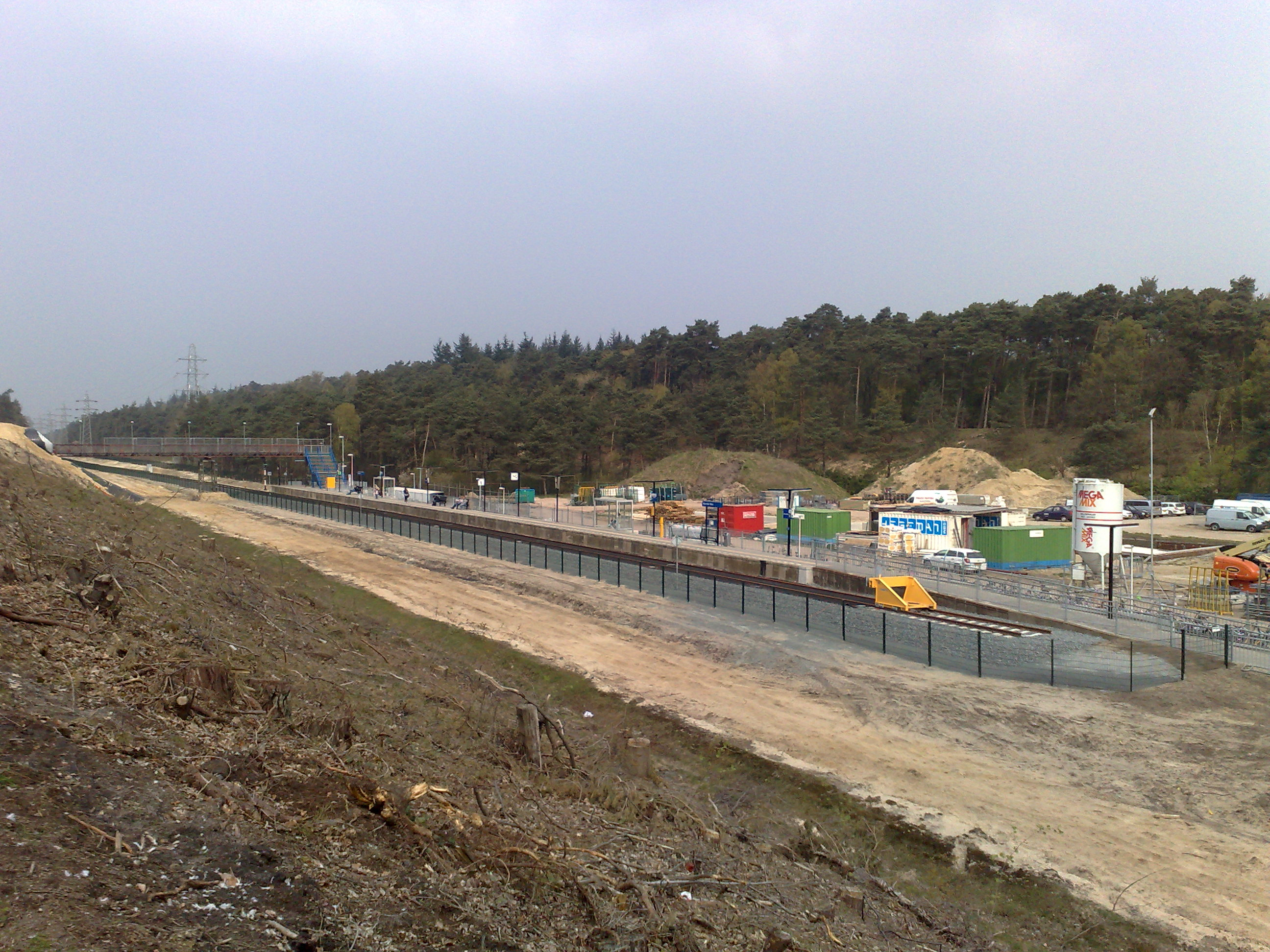

General information
- Location: Netherlands
- Coordinates: 52°22′04″N 6°27′01″E
- Line: Zwolle–Almelo railway

History
- Opened: 14 December 2009
- Closed: 3 March 2013

Services
Preceding station	Nederlandse Spoorwegen	Following station
Raalte towards Zwolle	NS Sprinter 17900	Terminus
Location
- Location within Netherlands

Nijverdal West was a temporary railway station located in Nijverdal, the Netherlands. The station was located on the Zwolle–Almelo railway and opened on 14 December 2009. It closed on 3 March 2013. The services were operated by Nederlandse Spoorwegen.

To improve road and rail routes between Almelo and Zwolle there were many works along the line. As a result of this, temporary station Nijverdal West was opened in December 2009. During its operational period, there was no direct service between Zwolle and Almelo. The services operated as Zwolle - Nijverdal West and Nijverdal - Almelo - Enschede, with a shuttle bus service between Nijverdal West and Nijverdal.

== Train service ==
The following services called at Nijverdal West:

- 2× per hour local service (stoptrein) Zwolle - Nijverdal West
