= Holten railway station =

Railway station in Holten, Netherlands

Holten
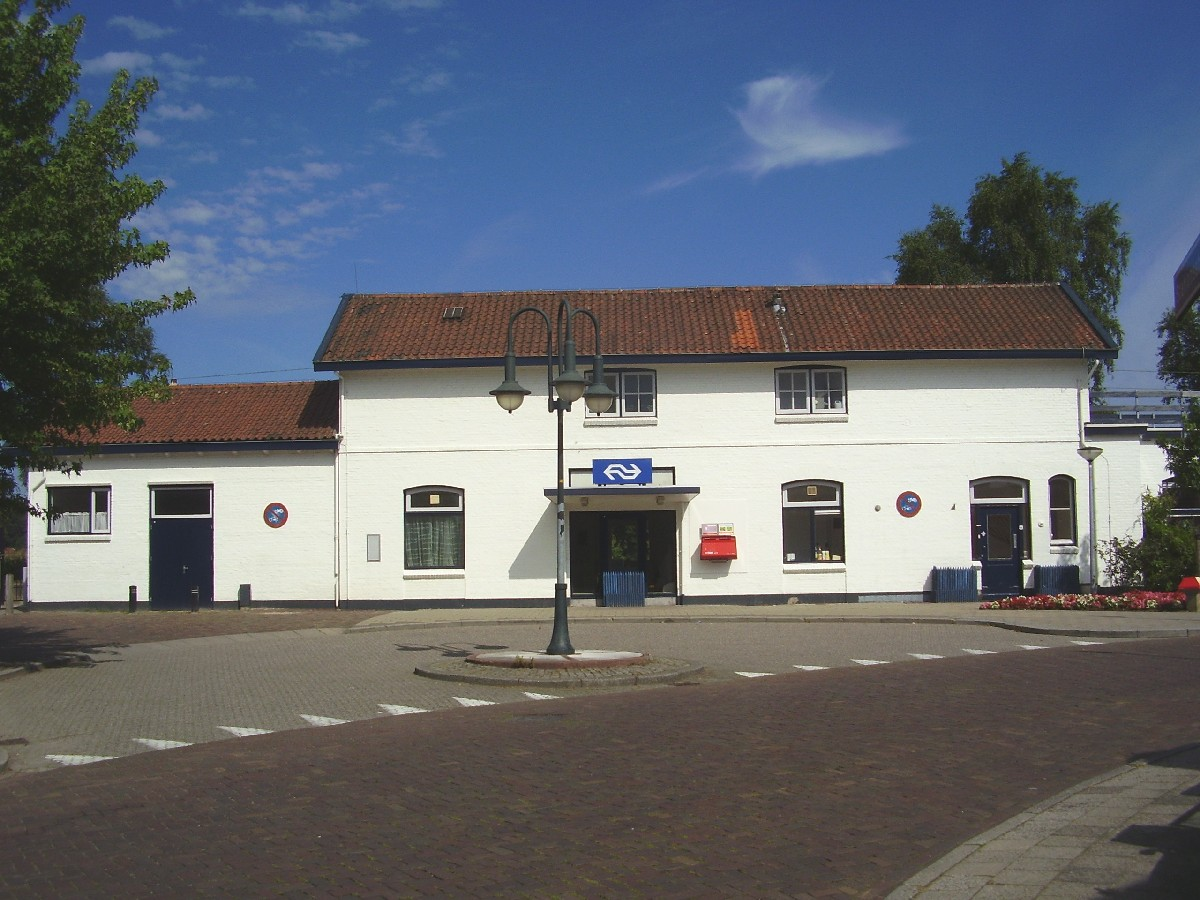

General information
- Location: Netherlands
- Coordinates: 52°17′02″N 6°25′14″E
- Line: Deventer–Almelo railway

History
- Opened: 1888

Services
Preceding station	Nederlandse Spoorwegen	Following station
Deventer Colmschate towards Apeldoorn	NS Sprinter 7000	Rijssen towards Enschede
Location
- Location within Netherlands

Holten is a railway station located in Holten, Netherlands. The station was opened on 1 September 1888 and is located on the Deventer–Almelo railway. It closed on 15 May 1938, but reopened on 1 June 1940. The train services are operated by Nederlandse Spoorwegen.

== Train services ==
Route	Service type	Operator	Notes
Apeldoorn - Deventer - Almelo (- Enschede)	Local ("Sprinter")	NS	2x per hour - weekends 1x per hour

== Bus services ==
Line	Route	Operator	Notes
97	Holten - Markelo - Herikerberg - Goor - Hengevelde - Sint Isidorushoeve - Haaksbergen	Twents	On Saturday evenings, this bus only operates between Holten and Goor. No service on Sundays.
