= Rijssen railway station =

Railway station in Rijssen, Netherlands

Rijssen
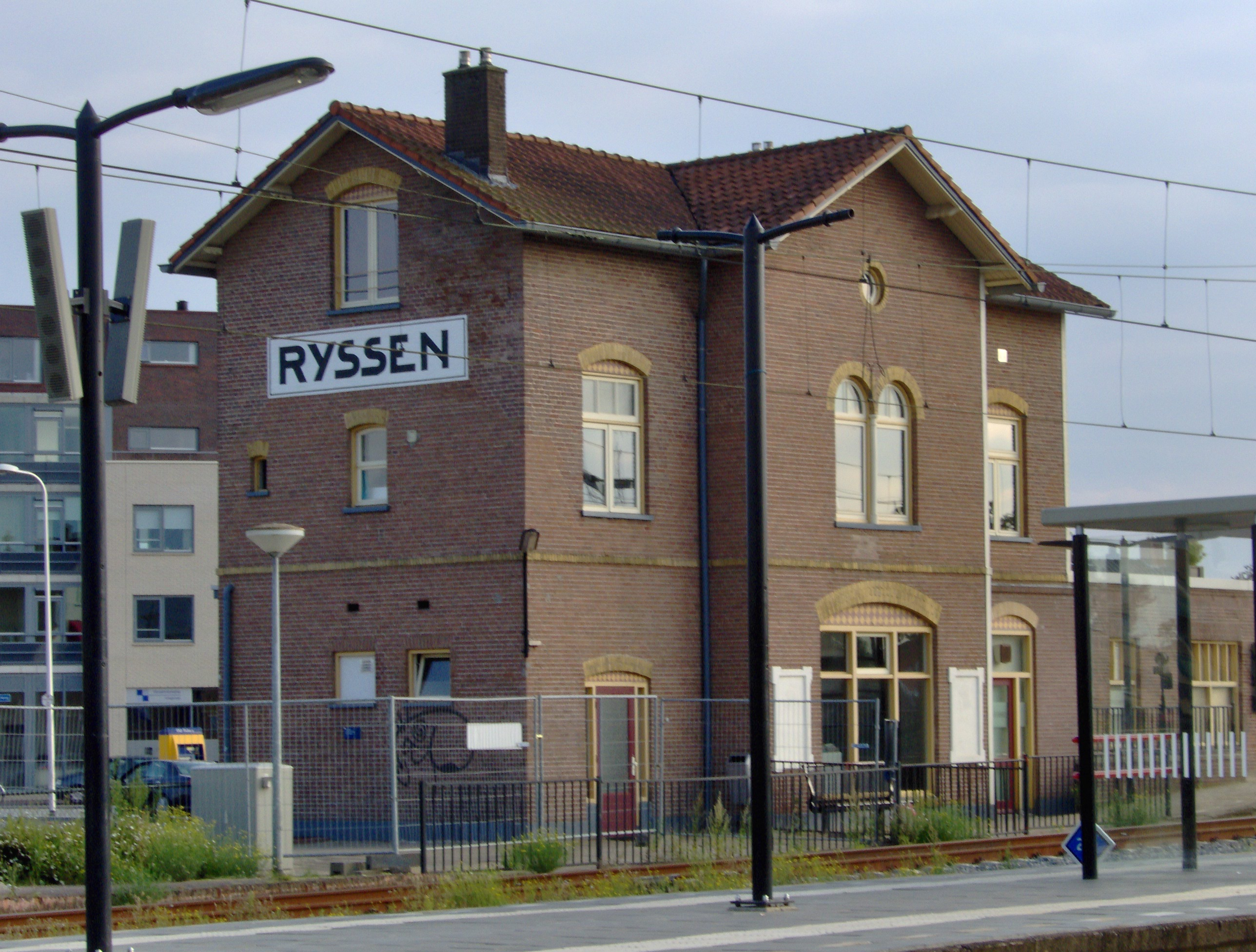

General information
- Location: Netherlands
- Coordinates: 52°18′42″N 6°31′09″E
- Line: Deventer–Almelo railway

History
- Opened: 1 September 1888

Services
Preceding station	Nederlandse Spoorwegen	Following station
Holten towards Apeldoorn	NS Sprinter 7000	Wierden towards Enschede
Location
- Location within Netherlands

Rijssen is a railway station located in Rijssen, Netherlands. The station was opened on 1 September 1888 and is located on the Deventer–Almelo railway. The train services are operated by Nederlandse Spoorwegen. From 1910 to 1935 there was a railway line that passed through Rijssen from Neede to Hellendoorn.

== Train services ==
Route	Service type	Operator	Notes
Apeldoorn - Deventer - Almelo (- Enschede)	Local ("Sprinter")	NS	2x per hour - weekends 1x per hour

== Bus services ==
Line	Route	Operator	Notes
95	Almelo - Wierden - Notter - Rijssen - Enter - Goor - Diepenheim - Geesteren - Borculo	Twents	No service on Sundays.
96	Rijssen - Zuna - Nijverdal	Twents	No service after 22:00 (weekdays), Saturday evenings and on Sundays.
