= Nijverdal railway station =

Railway station in the Netherlands

Nijverdal
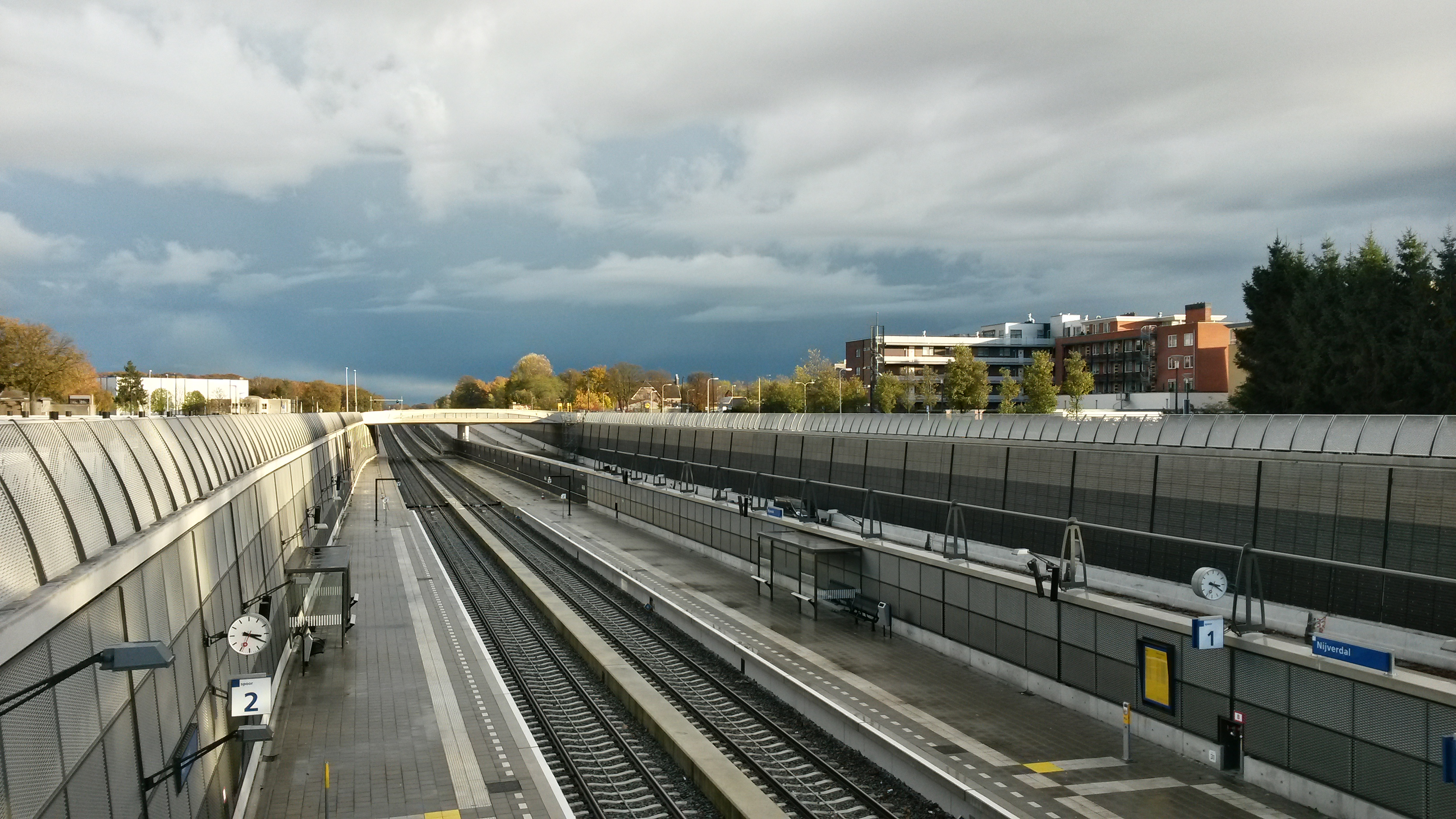

General information
- Location: Netherlands
- Coordinates: 52°21′56″N 6°28′13″E
- Line: Zwolle–Almelo railway

Services
Preceding station	Keolis Nederland	Following station
Raalte towards Zwolle	Sprinter 7900	Wierden towards Enschede
Raalte towards Zwolle	Intercity 17900 Not on evenings or weekends	Almelo towards Enschede
Location
- Location within Netherlands

Nijverdal is a railway station located in Nijverdal, the Netherlands. The station opened on 1 January 1881 and is located on the Zwolle–Almelo railway. Train services are operated by Keolis Nederland. Previously, this station was called Hellendoorn-Nijverdal(1881-1925) and Nijverdal Noord (1925-1935), to differentiate it from the then main Nijverdal station, located on the former Neede-Hellendoorn railway (1910-1935).

In recent years, works have been carried out around Nijverdal station in order to improve road and rail routes between Almelo and Zwolle. Between December 2009 and March 2013, direct services between Zwolle and Almelo were interrupted. Coming from Zwolle, trains terminated at a temporary station Nijverdal West. Shuttle buses transported passengers to Nijverdal station, from where a service to Almelo and Enschede operated.

Meanwhile, a new Nijverdal station was constructed. Continuous rail traffic was reinstated on 1 April 2013, serving the new station. The old Nijverdal station was closed, and the temporary station demolished.

== Train services ==
Route	Service type	Operator	Notes
Zwolle - Almelo - Hengelo - Enschede	Local ("Sprinter")	Keolis Nederland	2x per hour
Zwolle - Almelo - Hengelo - Enschede	Express ("Intercity")	Keolis Nederland	1x per hour (weekdays only; not after 19:30)

== Bus services ==
Line	Route	Operator	Notes
96	Rijssen - Zuna - Nijverdal	Twents	No service after 22:00 (weekdays), Saturday evenings and on Sundays.
513	Nijverdal - Haarle - Raalte	Twents	1x 1,5 hour - no service on evenings and weekends.
594	Den Ham/Daarlerveen - Daarle - Hellendoorn - Hulsen - Nijverdal	Twents	No service on evenings and Sundays.
597	Nijverdal - Hulsen - Hellendoorn	Twents	No service on evenings and Sundays.
