= Deventer Colmschate railway station =

Railway station in the Netherlands

Deventer Colmschate
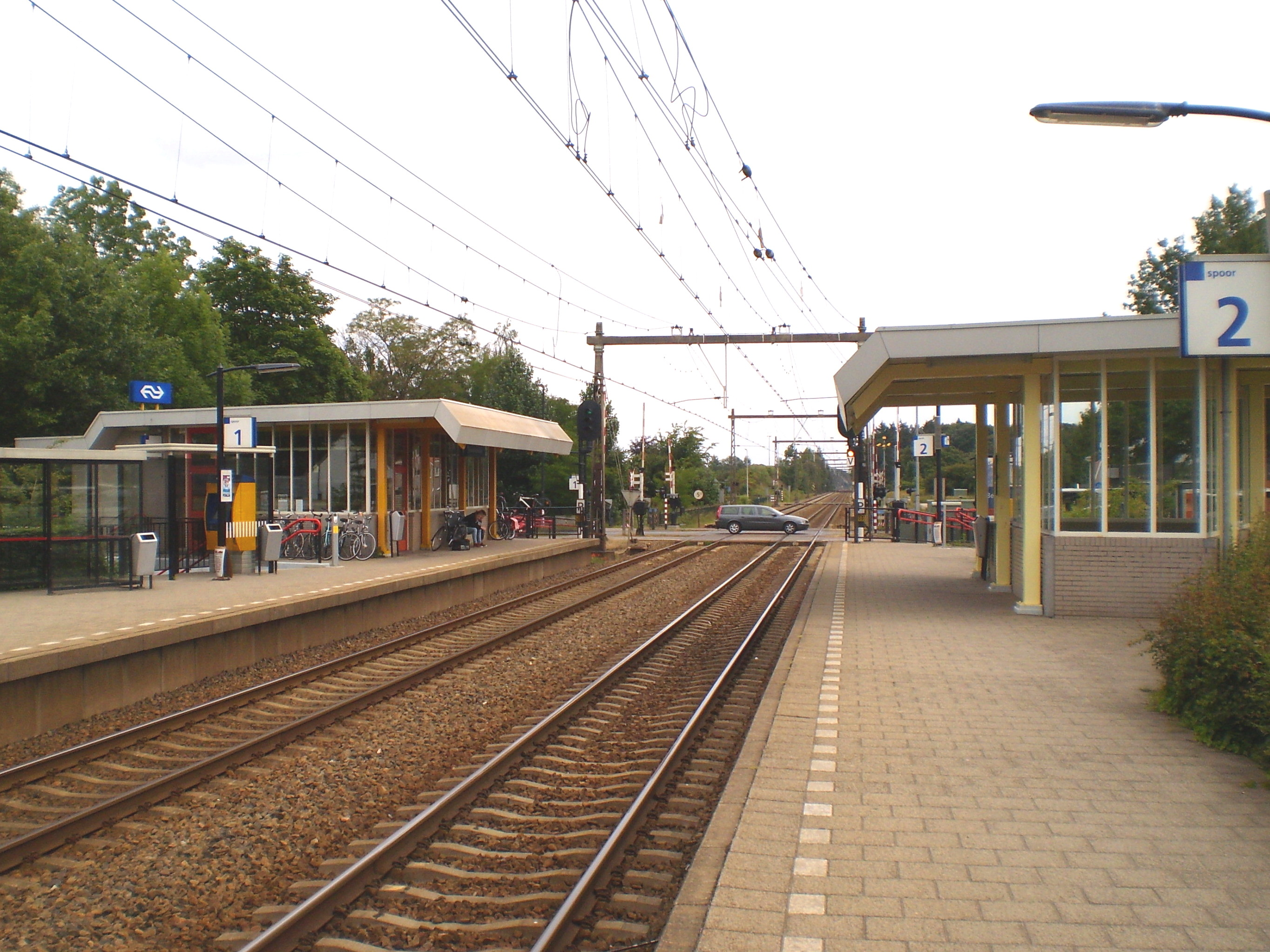

General information
- Location: Deventer, Netherlands
- Coordinates: 52°15′01″N 6°12′55″E
- Line: Deventer–Almelo railway

History
- Opened: 1 September 1888
- Closed: 10 May 1933

Services
Preceding station	Nederlandse Spoorwegen	Following station
Deventer towards Apeldoorn	NS Sprinter 7000	Holten towards Enschede
Location
- Location within Netherlands

Deventer Colmschate is a railway station located in Deventer, Netherlands. The station was opened in 1888 and is located on the Deventer–Almelo railway. The train services are operated by Nederlandse Spoorwegen.

The station was closed between 10 May 1933 and 10 December 1989. Before the reopening in 1989, the station's name was simply Colmschate as Colmschate was a village back then. Some time after the closure, it was incorporated as a neighbourhood of Deventer.

In 2018, a tunnel was dug under the station by ProRail to remove the railroad crossing.

== Train services ==
Route	Service type	Operator	Notes
Apeldoorn - Deventer - Almelo (- Enschede)	Local ("Sprinter")	NS	2x per hour - weekends 1x per hour

== Bus services ==
Line	Route	Operator	Notes
1	Deventer Station → Rivierenwijk → Snippeling → Colmschate → Blauwenoord → Snippeling → Rivierenwijk → Deventer Station	Syntus Overijssel	
5	Deventer Station - Ziekenhuis (Hospital) - De Vijfhoek - Colmschate	Syntus Overijssel	

A little bit south of the station, there's another bus stop called De Scheg, where line 6 and 160 halt.
