= Heino railway station =

Railway station in the Netherlands

Heino

General information
- Location: Netherlands
- Coordinates: 52°25′37″N 6°13′19″E
- Line: Zwolle–Almelo railway

History
- Opened: 1 January 1881

Services
Preceding station	Keolis Nederland	Following station
Zwolle Terminus	Sprinter 7900	Raalte towards Enschede
Location
- Location within Netherlands

Heino is a railway station located in Heino, Netherlands. The station was opened on 1 January 1881 and is located on the Zwolle–Almelo railway. The station lies outside of Heino, but can be reached by bus.

== Train services ==
Route	Service type	Operator	Notes
Zwolle - Almelo - Hengelo - Enschede	Local ("Stoptrein")	Keolis Nederland	2x per hour

== Bus services ==
Line	Route	Operator	Notes
503	Zwolle Zuid - Laag Zuthem - Lierderholthuis - Heino	Syntus Overijssel	No service after 21:00 and on weekends. Evening service (from 18:00-21:00) is suspended during Summer Break.
