= Rijssen =

Rijssen Riesn (Sallands)
- City
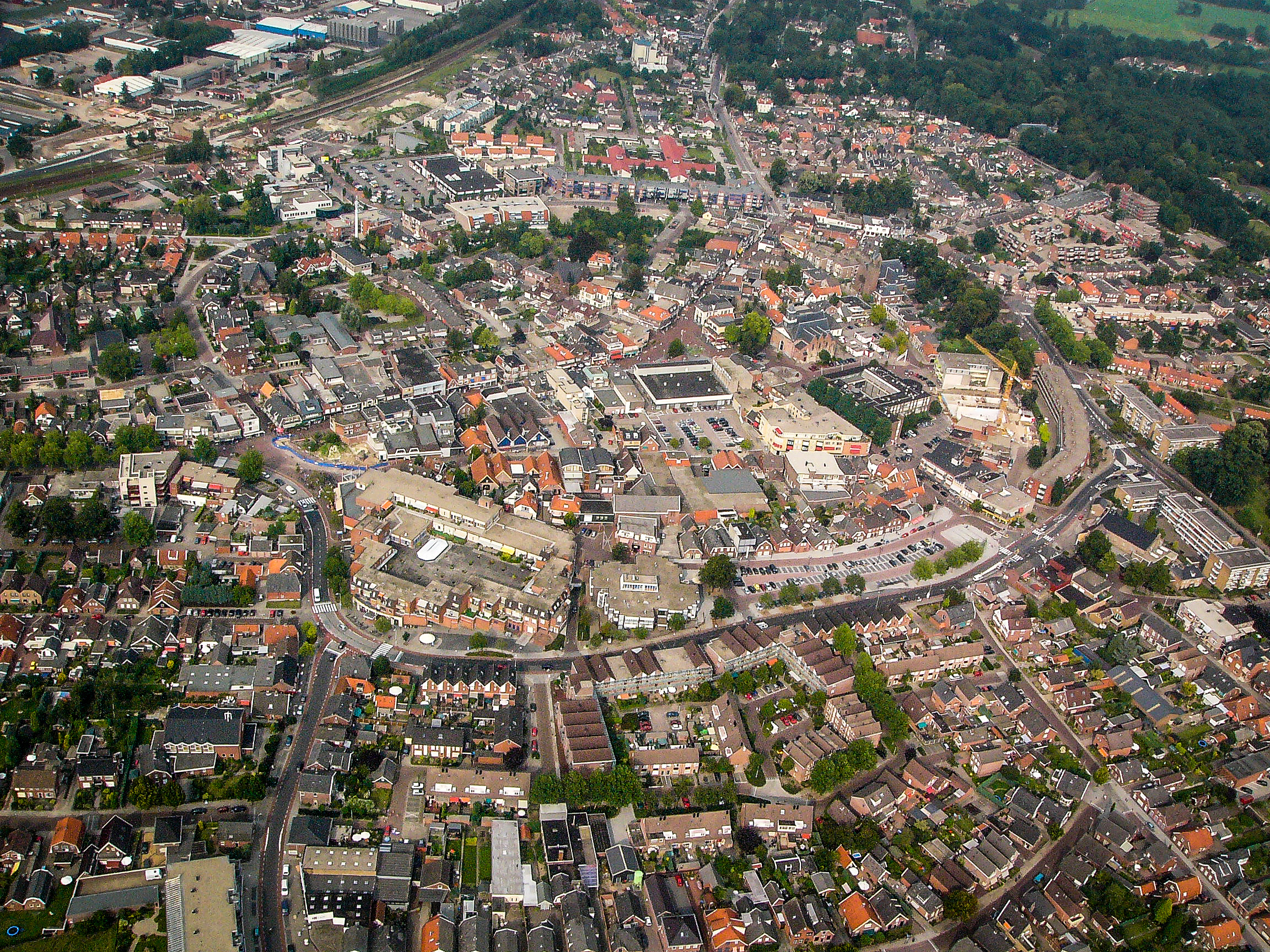
- Aerial view of Rijssen

- Flag Coat of arms

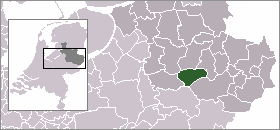

- Location in the province of Overijssel in the Netherlands Rijssen (Netherlands)
- Coordinates: 52°18′31″N 6°31′5″E
- Country: Netherlands
- Province: Overijssel
- Municipality: Rijssen-Holten

Area
  - Total: 8.09 km^{2} (3.12 sq mi)
- Elevation: 10 m (33 ft)

Population (2021)
  - Total: 27,740
  - Density: 3,430/km^{2} (8,880/sq mi)
- Time zone: UTC+1 (CET)
  - Summer (DST): UTC+2 (CEST)
- Postal code: 7461-7462
- Dialing code: 0548
- Website: www.rijssen-holten.nl

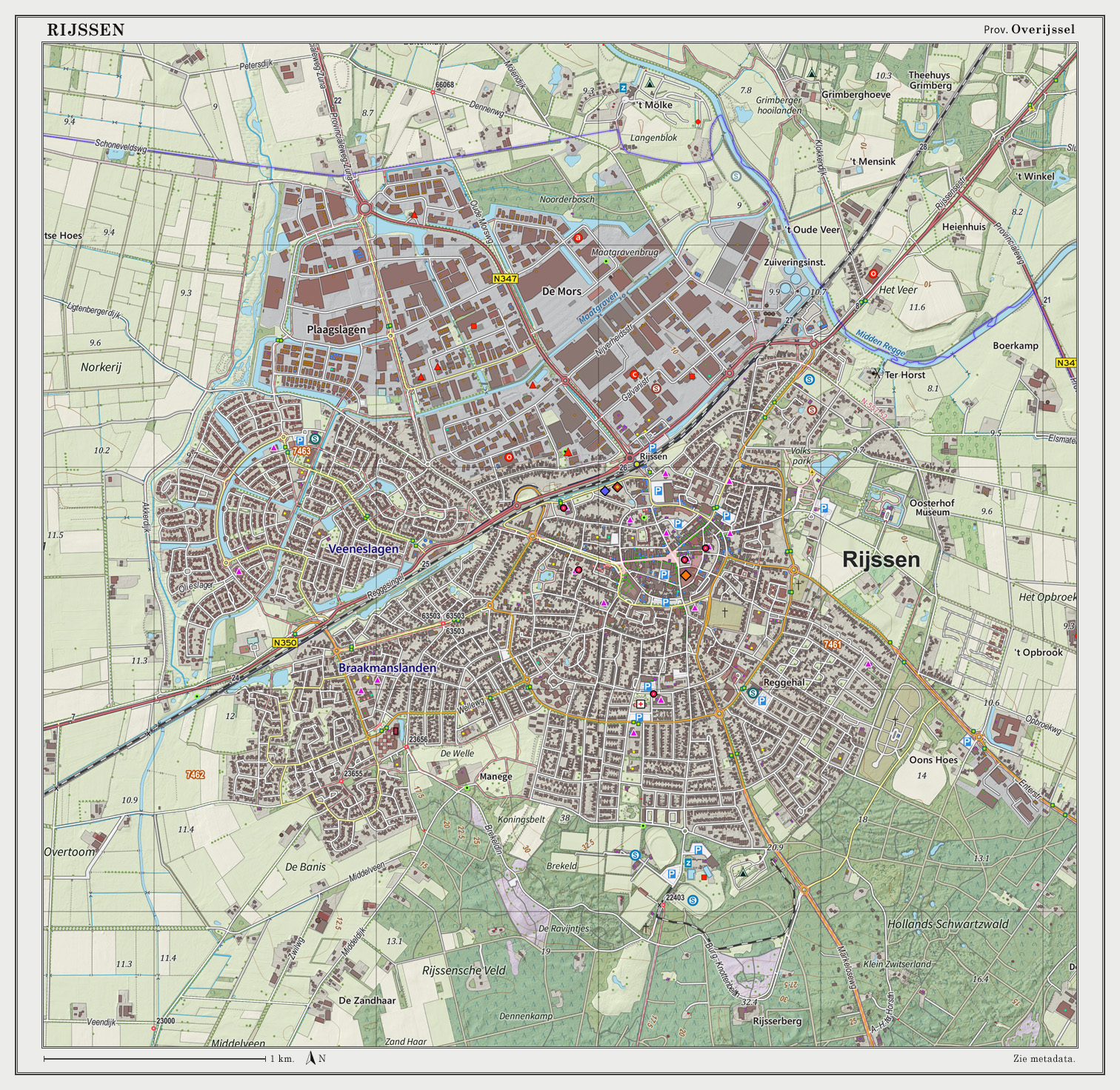
Topographic map of Rijssen, as of June 2014

Rijssen (Dutch: [ˈrɛisə(n)]; Twents: Riesn [ˈriːsn̩]) is a city in the Dutch province of Overijssel. It is part of Rijssen-Holten, one of thirteen municipalities in Twente. It has almost 28,000 inhabitants. The economy of Rijssen relies mostly on commerce and construction and transport companies.

== History ==
Archeological evidence shows that the monk Lebuinus founded a church in Rijssen, as early as the seventh century, as part of a coordinated attempt to convert the local pagan Saxons to Christianity, though other archaeological finds, such as urns and grave mounds suggest habitation dating back as far as 5,000 years.

Rijssen was first mentioned as Parrochia Risnen on a freight letter dating from 1188 by the Count of Dalen.

After having a disagreement with the Viscount of Goor, Bishop Otto III van Holland granted city rights to Rijssen on 5 May 1243. The original city rights bill was lost in a large fire that swept through the town, reducing the town hall and the keep to rubble. In 2006, however, a copy was given to the newly instated town council.

In the 14th century, Rijssen entered the Hanseatic league. Of the old town, only a church and a few houses dating from the eighteenth century remain.

From 1580 to 1584, Rijssen suffered greatly from the Eighty Years' War. The city of Deventer was under the state's command, while the town of Oldenzaal was under Spanish command. The two opposing parties would often meet halfway for battle, around Rijssen.

The 18th century saw the rise of the Industrial Revolution in Rijssen. Many farmers participated in textile manufacturing; whole families, women and children, were involved in this trade, often under poor conditions. In the 19th and early 20th century, Rijssen, like many other towns in the Netherlands, saw the introduction of power looms. This spearheaded the local Ter Horst factory among the regional top jute producers. These however went bankrupt in the 1970s due to overpowering Asian competition. Factory workers were forced to find other means of income and many started their own businesses, either in transport or in construction engineering.

Rijssen was a separate municipality until it merged with Holten in 2001. The working title of the municipality was "Rijssen", and it got the final name "Rijssen-Holten" in 2003.

== Transport ==
- Railway station: Rijssen

Rijssen is easily accessible through a number of provincial roads, such as the N347 and the N350, the latter connects Rijssen to the village of Holten and lends its name to the local radio station. Through these provincial roads, Rijssen has access to the motorway A1 from Amsterdam to the German border.

All neighbourhoods in Rijssen are easily accessible by bus.

== Facilities/tourism ==
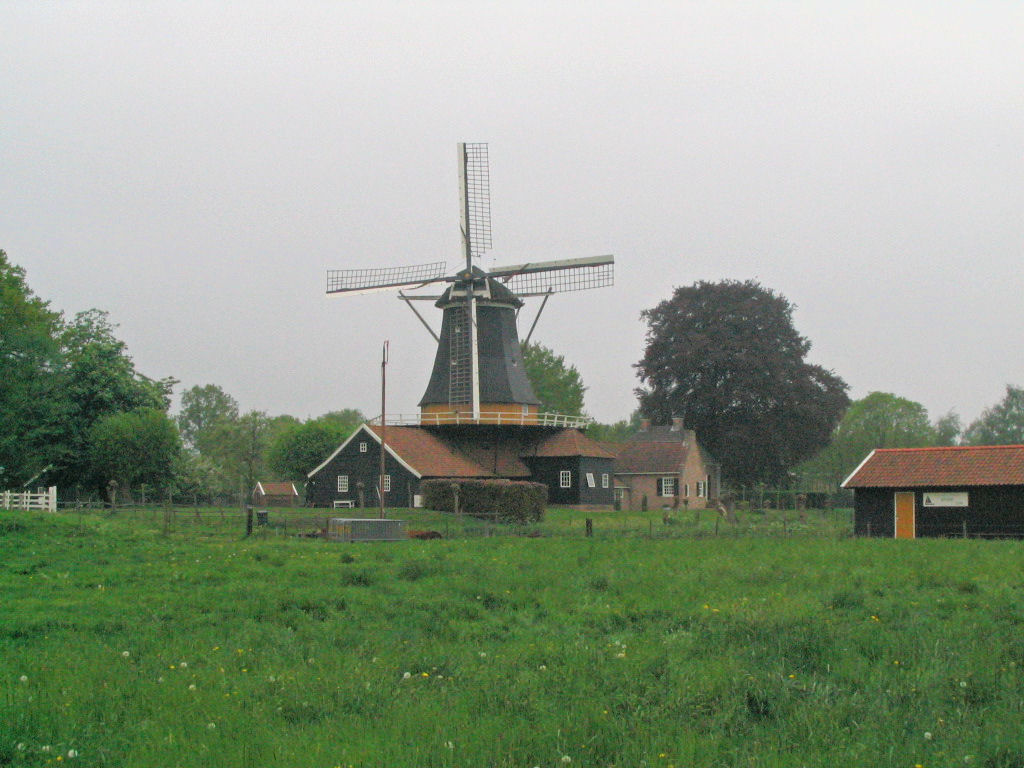
The Pelmolen

Rijssen has multiple shopping facilities in its centre, which also accommodates a number of bars, pubs and lunchrooms. It has a large discothèque that attracts visitors from all neighbouring towns and villages. The small town has a fire brigade museum and a monumental church, the Schildkerk. The restored and fully functional mill de Pelmolen is one of the major attractions of the town.

Rijssen is surrounded by a versatile landscape, accommodating a number of camp sites.

Being close to Germany, it is an ideal location for European companies, such as Zwaartransport Twente or ZTT, member of the Van der Vlist group, who are heavy transport specialists, with a focus on moving agricultural equipment.

== Population and politics ==
The inhabitants of Rijssen are known for their pride for their town, their self-sufficiency and working ethos. This pride shows in the fact that Rijssen has its own anthem.

Rijssen has a large community of several Protestant groups, with several churches, as well as a small Roman Catholic parish. The conservative Calvinist Reformed Political Party (SGP) long held the strongest position in the municipality's council. A large percentage of Rijssen's population are members of one of these conservative groups. Rijssen also has communities of Moluccan, Turkish, Syrian and Moroccan people.

== Language ==
As Rijssen lies in the Dutch Low Saxon language area of Western Europe, and has a rich trading history going back to Heanseatic times, the town has developed a distinct variety of Low Saxon, known as Riessens. It shares many characteristics with Low Saxon dialects of surrounding communities, which are categorised as Tweants, although it has some very distinct characteristics, most notably in pronunciation. Riessens is by some considered one of the more conservative varieties of Tweants, although there are no scientific grounds for this idea.

=== Development ===
A large peat bog to the west of the Tweante region long formed a natural border, separating it from the rest of the Netherlands. Twente was, therefore, more geographically, economically and culturally inclined towards the east, modelling their clothing and speech to Munsterlandic fashion.

As the town of Enschede in the east of Twente became a textile powerhouse during the Industrial Revolution and the model for fashion and language, Twente gradually severed the old ties with Münster. Enschede attracted people from the entire country, while settlers from the nearby Drenthe and Groningen regions were invited to come and till the eastern parts of Twente. Their dialect features gradually influenced the Munsterlandic traits. Rijssen had its own (smaller-scale) textile industry, which obsoleted their need to look beyond. Additionally, in the 19th century, Rijssen and surrounding villages became largely protestant in an otherwise mainly Roman Catholic region. This caused a cultural rift between the eastern and western parts of Twente. Rijssen, by then becoming more and more conservative and therefore seclusive, developed a few language traits, while retaining some of the old Munsterlandic features that were lost in others.

For instance, the pronunciation of the Riessens word 'weten', which is pronounced /ʋɪətn̩/ (to know) is, despite their different written forms, equal to the Munsterlandic wiäten. In more eastern parts of Tweante, this word has evolved into 'wetten' (pronounced /ʋɛtn̩/).

=== Features ===
Characteristic features include diphthongisation of a number of vowels that are monophthongs in other varieties of Tweants. For instance, in other varieties, the words breef (letter), groot (large), and neuze (nose) are pronounced /bɾef, ɣɾɔːt, nœzə/, whereas in Riessens they are pronounced /bɾeəf, ɣɾɔət, nœəzə/. Older speakers may even be heard pronouncing them /bɾɪəf, ɣɾʊət, nʏəzə/. This phenomenon is known as vowel breaking. This indicates that Riessens is part of the larger Westphalian branch of Low Saxon.

Other features are vowel elongation, and some additional vowels that are absent in other varieties, such as the ASH vowel. Below are few examples:

- stemme (voice) - stämme (stems).
  - IPA: /ˈstemə/ and /ˈstæmə/
- veste (vests) - vuste (already) - vuuste (fists) - völs te (much too)
  - IPA: /ˈvɛstə/ - /ˈvʏstə/ - /ˈvystə/ - /ˈvɜstə/

One notable feature that sets Riessens apart from other varieties of Tweants is its sing-song, nasal quality. Due to vowel elongation, combined with syllabic consonants, Riessens has (to some extent) a different rhythm than other varieties, perhaps comparable with North Germanic languages.
