= Nico van der Vegt =

Dutch computational chemist

- Born: 14 November 1970 (age 55); Raalte, The Netherlands
- Education: University of Twente
- Scientific career
- Institutions: ETH Zürich; Max Planck Institute for Polymer Research; Technische Universität Darmstadt
- Doctoral advisor: Heiner Strathmann
- Other academic advisors: Wim Briels, Matthias Wessling, Wilfred F. van Gunsteren
- Website: www.cpc.tu-darmstadt.de

Nico van der Vegt (born 14 November 1970 in Raalte) is a Dutch chemist and a professor of computational physical chemistry at Technische Universität Darmstadt.

== Academic career ==
Van der Vegt studied chemical engineering and received his PhD from the University of Twente in 1998 on a study of methods for calculating thermodynamic and transport properties of small molecules in polymer membranes based on computer simulations. From 1998 to 2002, he was a lecturer at the University of Twente. Following this, he worked as a postdoctoral researcher at ETH Zürich with Wilfred F. van Gunsteren from 2002 to 2003. He then led a research group at the Max Planck Institute for Polymer Research, Mainz, Germany. In 2009, he was appointed as a full professor for computational physical chemistry at the Technische Universität Darmstadt.

== Research ==
His main research interests center on the thermodynamics and statistical mechanics of liquids and soft matter systems. His work includes studies on the physical fundamentals and thermodynamics of aqueous solvation, including cosolvent and salt effects on the water solubility of macromolecules and the stability of proteins. To this end, he works on the development of intermolecular potential models and computational methods for atomistic and coarse-grained molecular dynamics simulations of liquids, polymers, and biological materials. (ResearcherID: B-3441-2010).
