= Salland-Twente tunnel =

Tunnel in the Netherlands

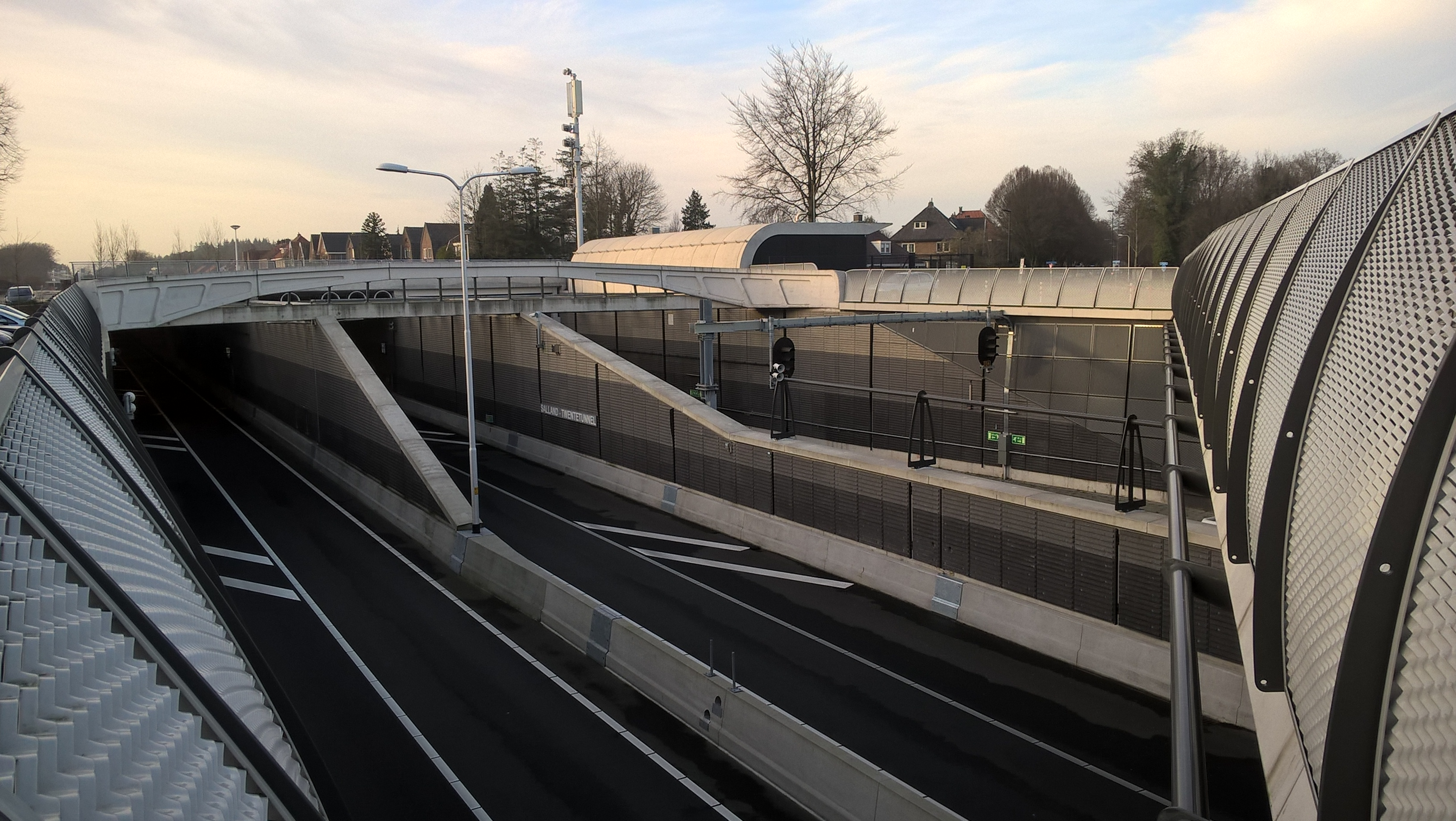

Overview
- Location: Nijverdal, the Netherlands
- Coordinates: 52°21′59″N 6°27′38″E
- Route: N35

Operation
- Opened: 2013
- Operator: Rijkswaterstaat

Technical
- Length: ~1500 m
- No. of lanes: 2

The Salland-Twente tunnel is a combined road and railway tunnel in the town of Nijverdal in the Dutch province of Overijssel.

The tunnel was part of the Combiplan to redirect traffic on the N35 away from the main road in the center of the town. The railway part of the tunnel, part of the Zwolle-Almelo railway, was first used in April 2013, the road part was opened in August 2015.

The total costs of the Combiplan were estimated to be around 330 million euros.
