= Almelo railway station =

Railway station in Almelo, Netherlands

Almelo
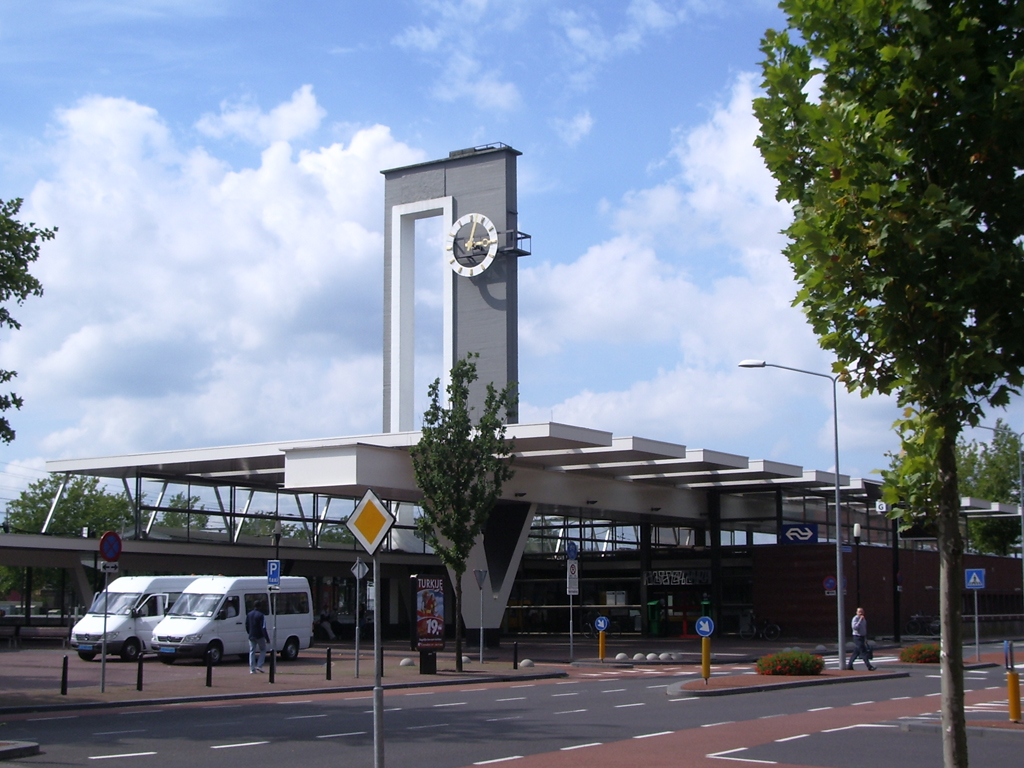

General information
- Location: Netherlands
- Coordinates: 52°21′26″N 6°39′18″E
- Lines: Deventer–Almelo railway Almelo–Salzbergen railway Zwolle–Almelo railway Mariënberg–Almelo railway

History
- Opened: 18 October 1865
Services
| Preceding station | Nederlandse Spoorwegen | Following station |
|---|---|---|
| Deventer towards Den Haag Centraal | NS Intercity 1700 Until 20:00 | Hengelo towards Enschede |
| Deventer towards Rotterdam Centraal | NS Intercity 1700 After 20:00 | Hengelo towards Enschede |
| Wierden towards Apeldoorn | NS Sprinter 7000 | Almelo de Riet towards Enschede |
| Preceding station | Keolis Nederland | Following station |
| Wierden towards Zwolle | Sprinter 7900 | Almelo de Riet towards Enschede |
| Nijverdal towards Zwolle | Intercity 17900 Not on evenings or weekends | Hengelo towards Enschede |
| Preceding station | Arriva Netherlands | Following station |
| Vriezenveen towards Hardenberg | Stoptrein 31000 | Terminus |
Location
- Location within Netherlands

Almelo is a railway station in Almelo, Netherlands. The station was opened on 18 October 1865 as the western terminus of the Almelo–Salzbergen railway. In later years it was connected to the Deventer–Almelo railway, Zwolle–Almelo railway and Mariënberg–Almelo railway lines. To cope with the increased workload, a new station building was opened in 1883. It was in turn replaced by the current station building in 1962. The train services are operated by Nederlandse Spoorwegen and Arriva.

== Train services ==
As of 11 December 2016, the following train services call at this station:

- 1× per hour express Intercity service: Schiphol - Amersfoort - Hengelo - Enschede
- 1× per hour express Intercity service: The Hague - Utrecht - Amersfoort - Hengelo - Enschede
- 2× per hour local Sprinter service: Apeldoorn - Deventer - Almelo (- Hengelo - Enschede) (1x per hour in evening and weekend; to Enschede during peak hours only)
- 2× per hour local Sprinter service: Zwolle - Almelo - Hengelo - Enschede
- 1× per hour local Stoptrein service: Almelo - Hardenberg (2× per hour during peak hours)

== Bus services ==
- 21 Syntus Station - Hospital - Windmolenbroek - Station (Almelo South)
- 22 Syntus Station - Windmolenbroek - Hospital - Station (Almelo South)
- 23 Syntus Station - Schelfhorst - Sluitersveld - Station (Almelo North)
- 24 Syntus Station - Sluitersveld - Schelfhorst - Station (Almelo North)
- 25 Syntus Station - Aalderinkshoek (Almelo West)
- 26 Syntus Station - Twenteborg Hospital (Almelo South)
- 51 Syntus Vriezenveen - Almelo - Borne - Hengelo
- 64 Syntus Almelo - Harbrinkhoek - Geesteren - Tubbergen - Vasse - Ootmarsum - Rossum - Oldenzaal - Losser - Overdinkel
- 66 Syntus Neede - Delden - Almelo - Almelo north-east - Albergen - Fleringen - Weerselo - Lemselo - Oldenzaal
- 80 Syntus Holten - Markelo - Goor - Rijssen - Wierden - Almelo - Westerhaar - Kloosterhaar - Bergentheim - Hardenberg

== Gallery ==
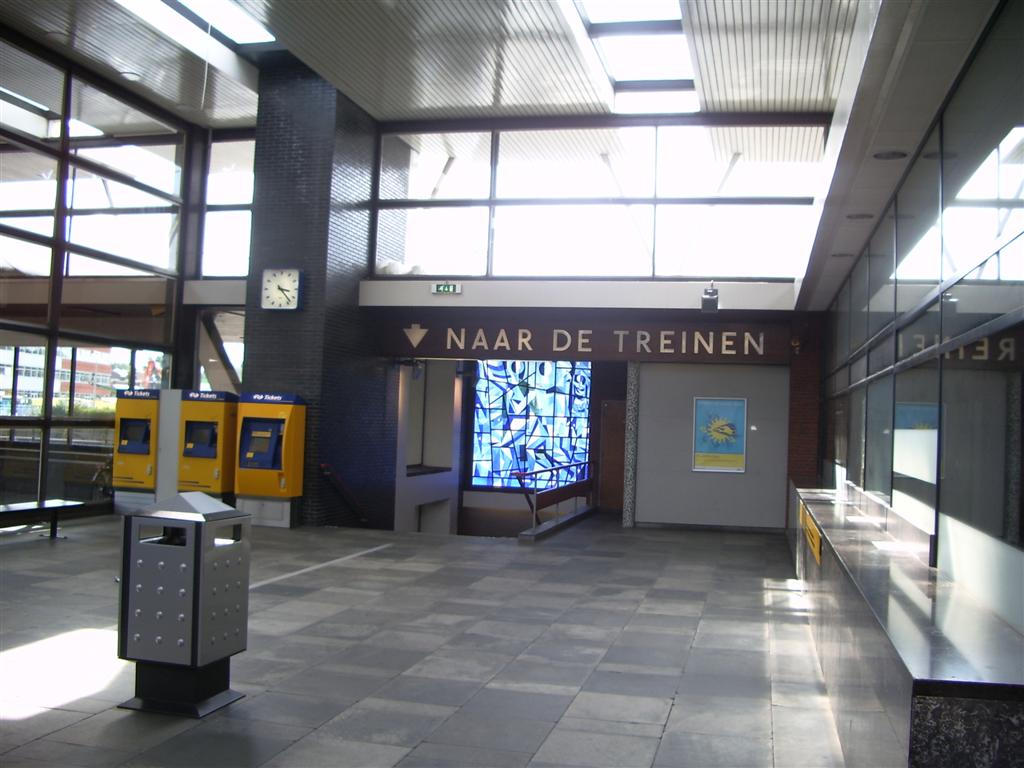
Station hall

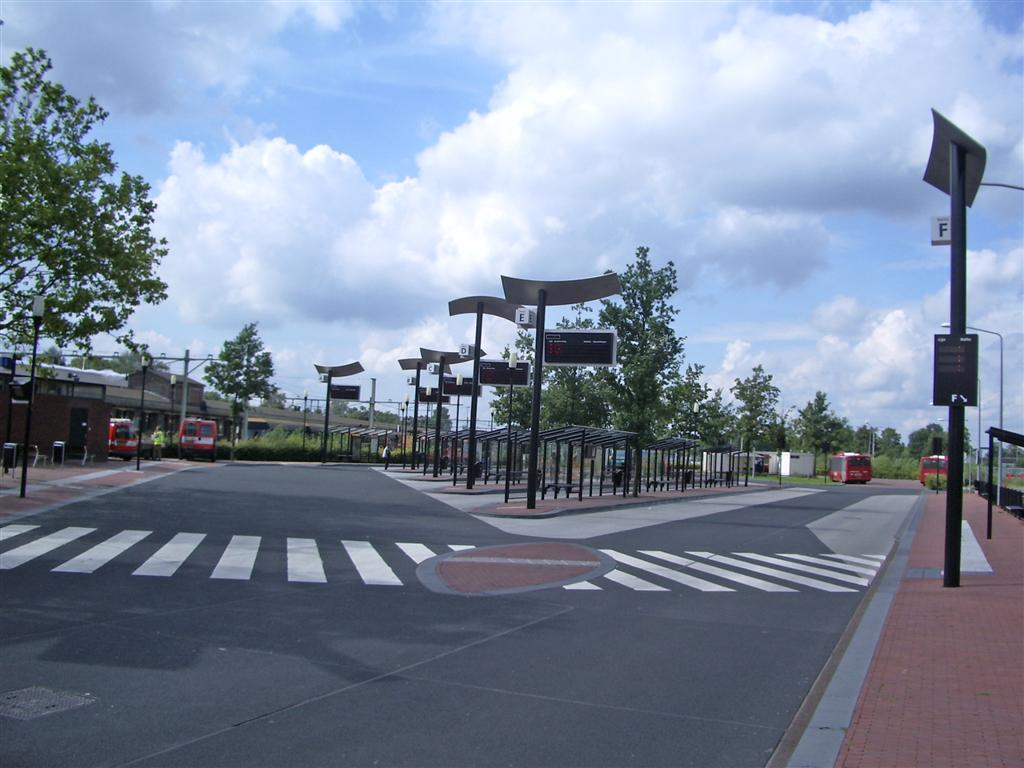
Bus station

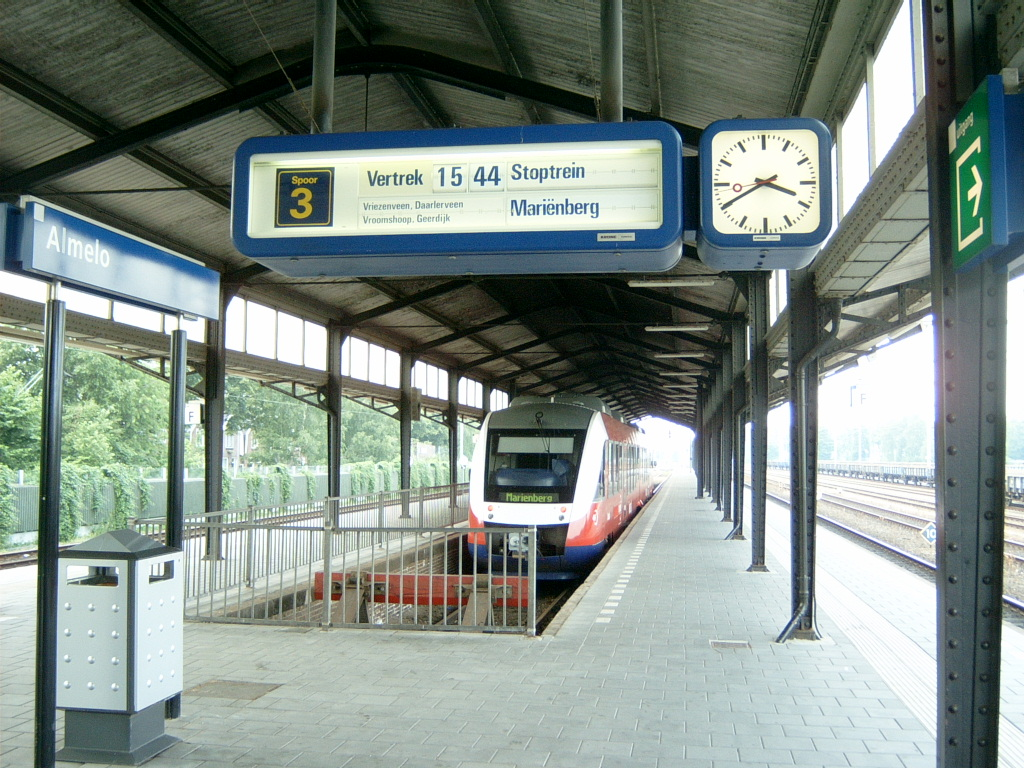
Bay platform for the train to Hardenberg

Station Almelo-II (1883-1962), 29 May 1961
