= Raalte =

- Municipality
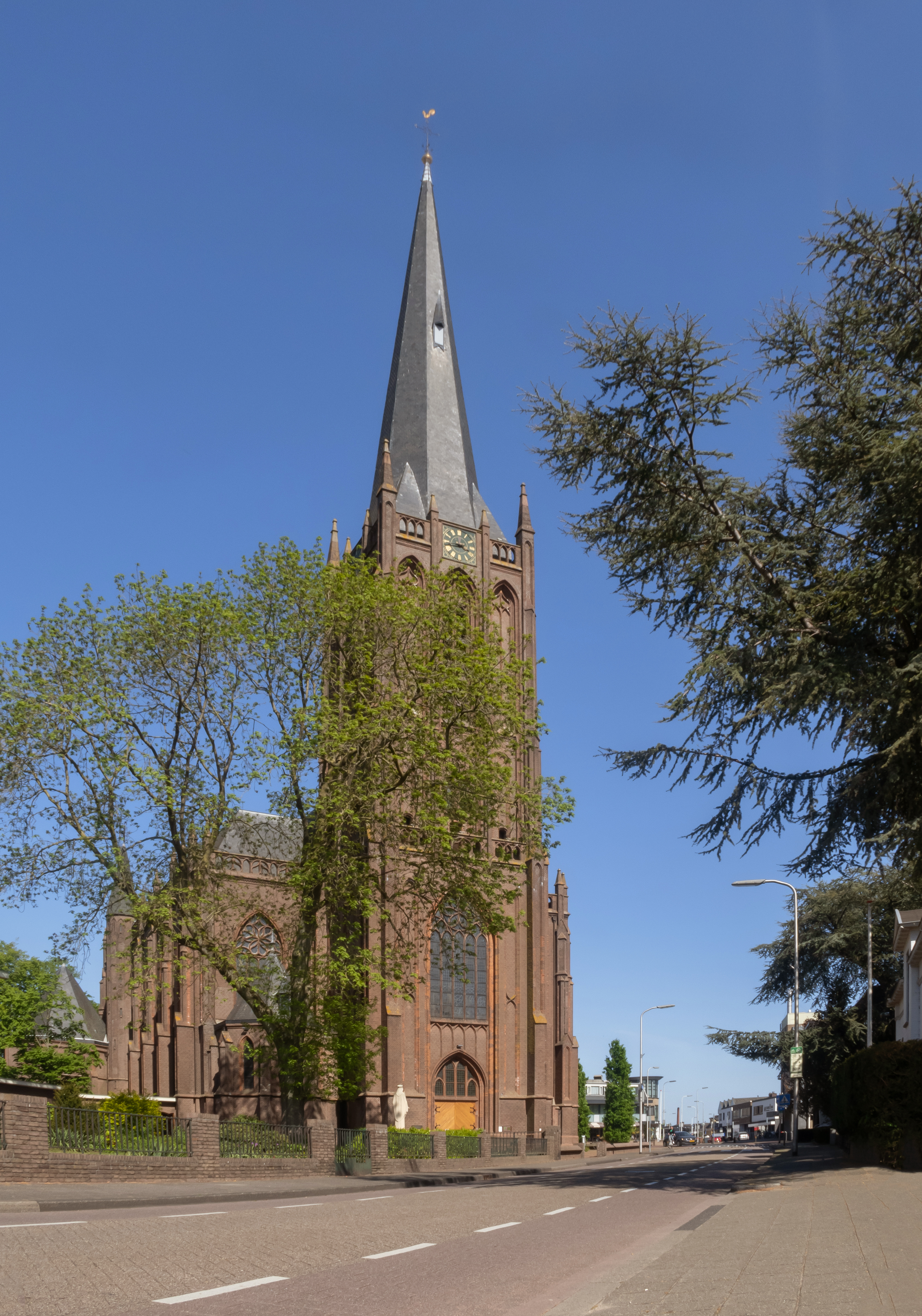
- Basilica van de Heilige Kruisverheffing in Raalte.

- Flag Coat of arms

- Location in Overijssel
- Coordinates: 52°23′N 6°16′E
- Country: Netherlands
- Province: Overijssel

Government
  - Body: Municipal council
  - Mayor: Martijn Dadema (GreenLeft)

Area
  - Total: 172.29 km^{2} (66.52 sq mi)
  - Land: 170.99 km^{2} (66.02 sq mi)
  - Water: 1.30 km^{2} (0.50 sq mi)
- Elevation: 5 m (16 ft)

Population (January 2021)
  - Total: 37,911
  - Density: 222/km^{2} (570/sq mi)
- Demonym(s): Raaltenaar, Raalter
- Time zone: UTC+1 (CET)
  - Summer (DST): UTC+2 (CEST)
- Postcode: 8055, 8100–8119, 8140–8144
- Area code: 0572
- Website: www.raalte.nl

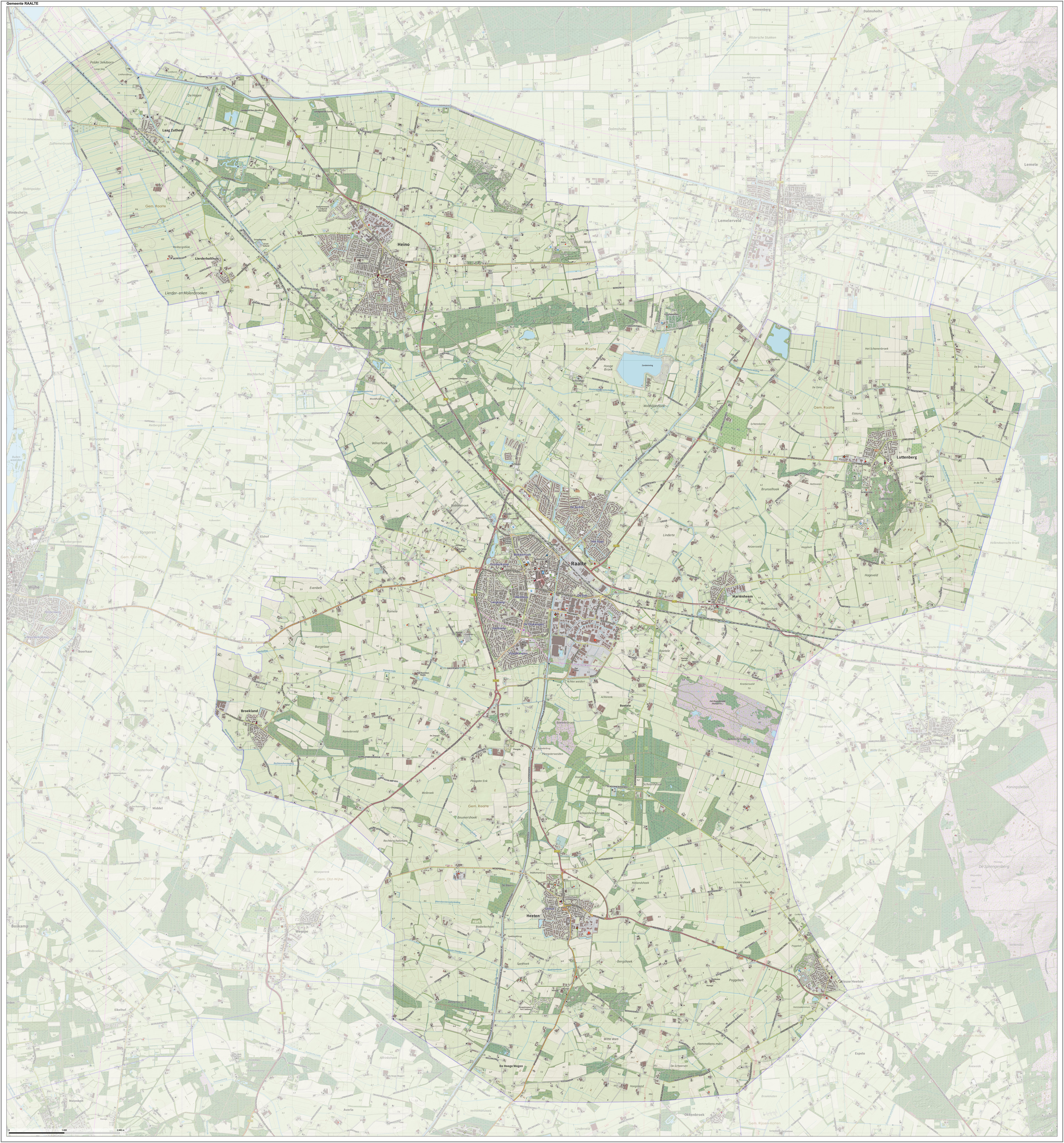
Dutch Topographic map of Raalte, June 2015

Raalte (Dutch pronunciation: [ˈraːltə]) is a municipality and a town in the heart of the region of Salland in the Dutch province of Overijssel.

== Population centres ==
The municipality consists of the following towns and villages. Raalte is the main place of the municipality, with over 20,000 mostly Roman Catholic inhabitants. It is a regional market, education and shopping centre.

Number of inhabitants per town, 1 January 2017
Town	Number of inhabitants
Raalte	19,248
Heino	6,993
Heeten	3,618
Luttenberg	2,213
Broekland	1,181
Nieuw-Heeten	1,157
Mariënheem	1,469
Laag Zuthem	598
Lierderholthuis	429
Source: Municipality of Raalte

== Transport ==
Raalte railway station and Heino railway stations are located along the minor railroad Zwolle – Enschede. Frequency: mostly twice per hour.

There also is a bus-line running from the Raalte railway station called the buurtbus, along the lines: 516 Raalte - Heeten - Olst, 518 Raalte - Lemelerveld. It runs Monday to Friday, at mostly once per hour(Line 516 runs twice per hour).

An important road for motorists is the N348 Deventer – Wesepe (mun. Olst-Wijhe – Raalte – Lemelerveld – Ommen ( in northeasterly direction from Deventer). In Raalte it crosses a road (N35) from Zwolle going south-east over Heino, Raalte, Mariënheem and Nijverdal to Wierden, where it continues as a highway (A35) to Almelo and Enschede.

== Economy ==
Raalte has a lot of small industrial enterprises, many of them processing agricultural products. For the local economy, trade, agriculture (especially breeding cattle) and tourism are more important.

== Sights and events ==
- In Raalte there are two major festivals every year: Stöppelhaene and Ribs & Blues. Stöppelhaene is a Harvest Festival that has been celebrated in the last weekend (Wednesday through Sunday) of August since 1951. The highlight is the Harvest Parade on Thursday. Ribs & Blues is a music festival including blues music that has been held on the Whitsun weekend since '97.
- Luttenberg is known for its motorcycle races every summer.
- Luttenberg is also known for its Lourdes Cave, an artificial cave with a statue of the Virgin Mary of Lourdes, situated at the centre of the village opposing the parish church.
- South-west of Heino, just across the railroad and the border to the municipality Olst-Wijhe, stands the castle Nijenhuis. It hosts an important art museum ( Constant Permeke, Van Gogh et al.). Around the castle is a sculpture garden (Ossip Zadkine et al.).
- Near Luttenberg there is a small hill (Luttenberg) covered with heath and forest, where nice walks can be made.
- The Roman Catholic basilica "Kruisverheffing" (Exaltation of the Holy Cross) in Raalte. This Neo-Gothic church, designed by Alfred Tepe, was built in 1892. During "Stöppelhaene" there is an exposition of mosaics made out of seeds, representing religious themes. The festival starts and ends with special Holy Masses in this church.
- The small "Plaskerk", the oldest building in the centre of Raalte, is a Protestant church. A typical example of Dutch religious tolerance was that the Protestants were allowed to hold their Sunday services in the big Roman Catholic church, as the Plaskerk was restored in 2006.
- Once a year there is a blues festival called "Ribs & Blues". The festival is held close to Ascension Day. Some bands and artists that have played during this festival over the last few years include: The Beach Boys, Status Quo, and Candy Dulfer.

== Notable people ==
- Petronella van Woensel (1785 in Raalte – 1839) a Dutch painter and a graphic artist
- Albert Jan Maat (born 1953 in Heino) a Dutch politician and Member of the European Parliament
- Stijn Jaspers (1961 in Raalte – 1984) a Dutch runner, competed at the 1984 Summer Olympics
- Harry van Bommel (born 1962 in Helmond) a Dutch politician, anti-globalisation activist and former educator
- Jan Smeekens (born 1987 in Raalte) a Dutch speed skater, silver medallist at the 2014 Winter Olympics
- Nico van der Vegt (born 1970), chemist and professor

== Gallery ==
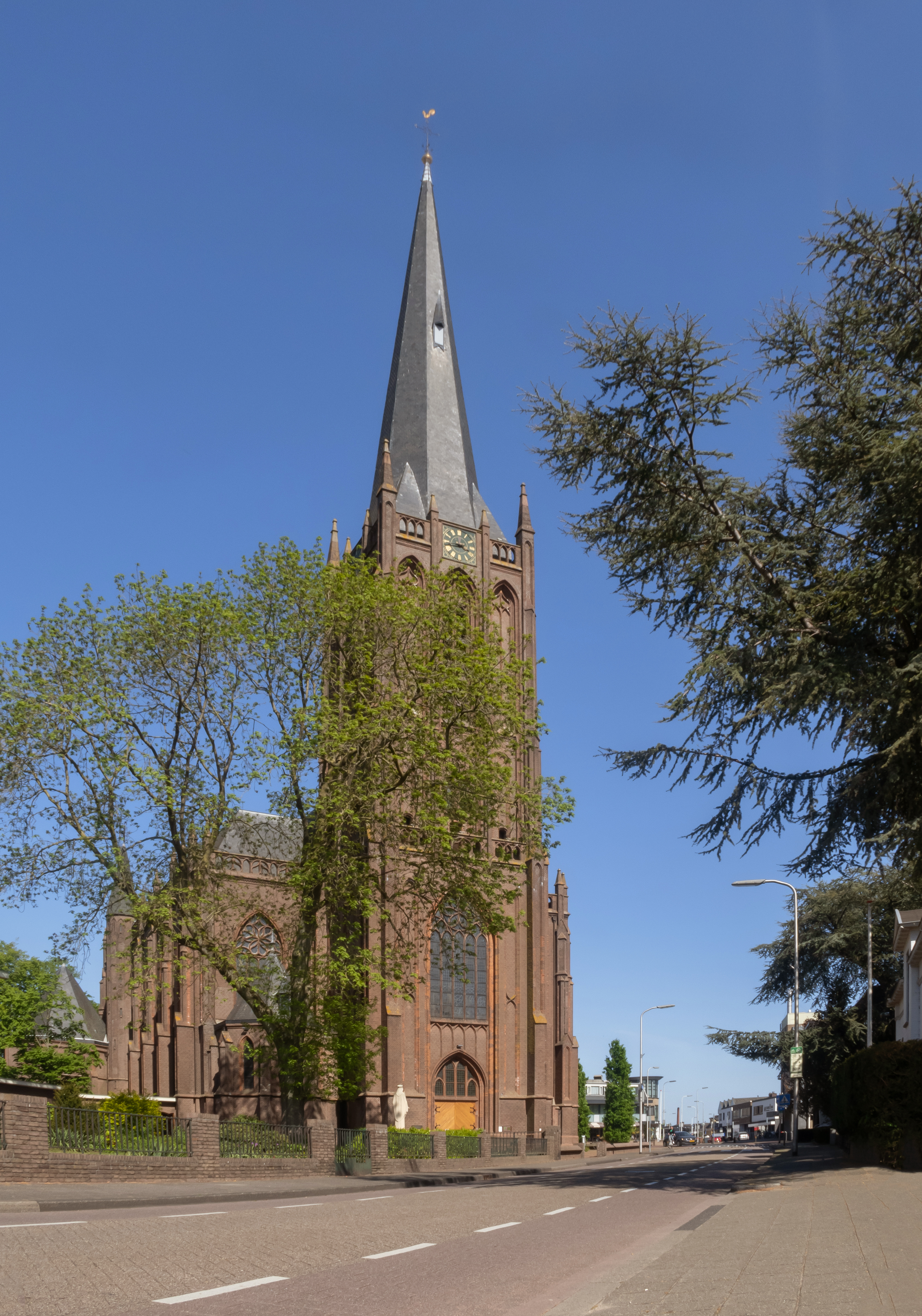
Raalte, church: Heilige Kruisverheffingskerk

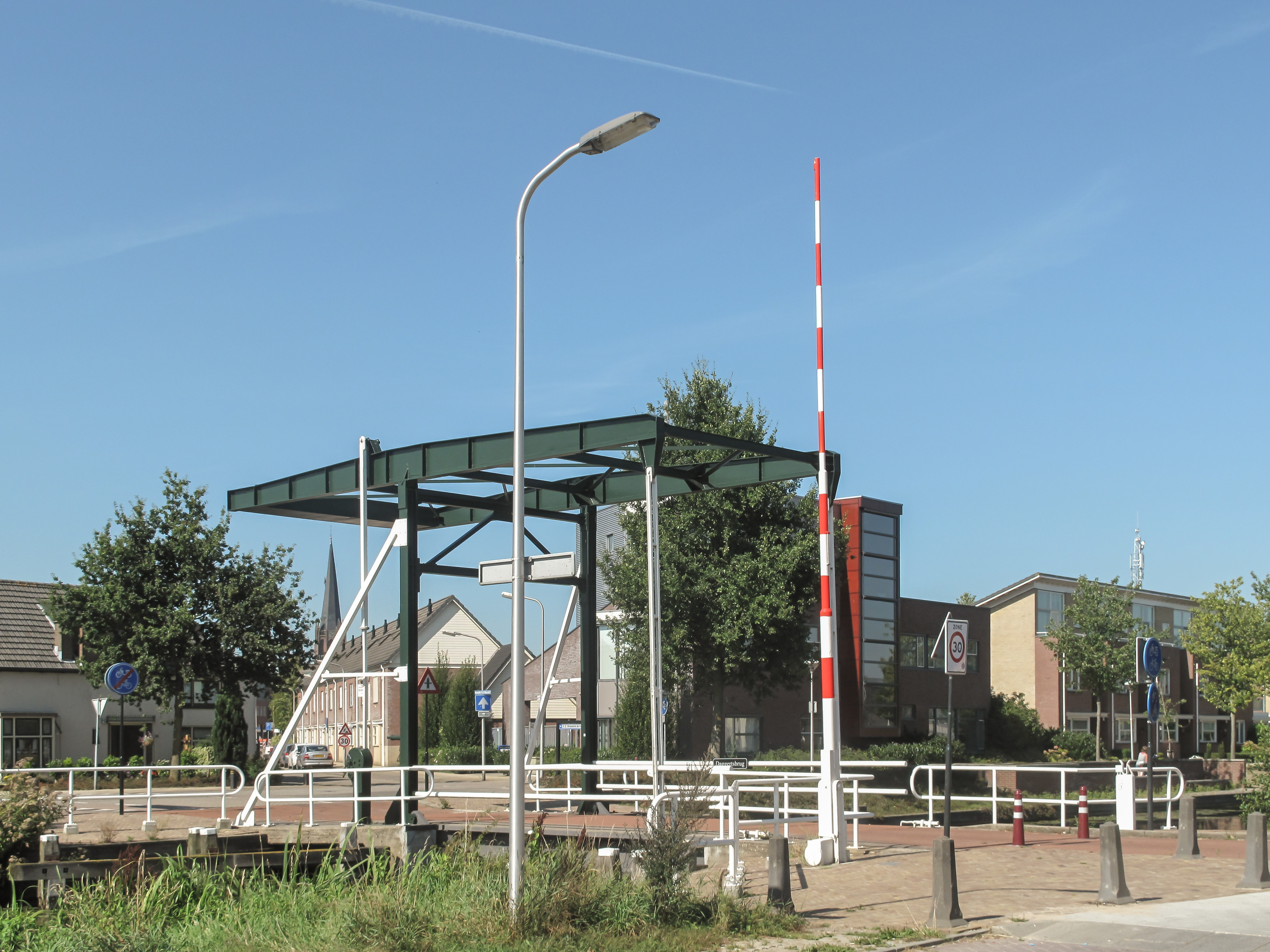
Raalte, drawing bridge

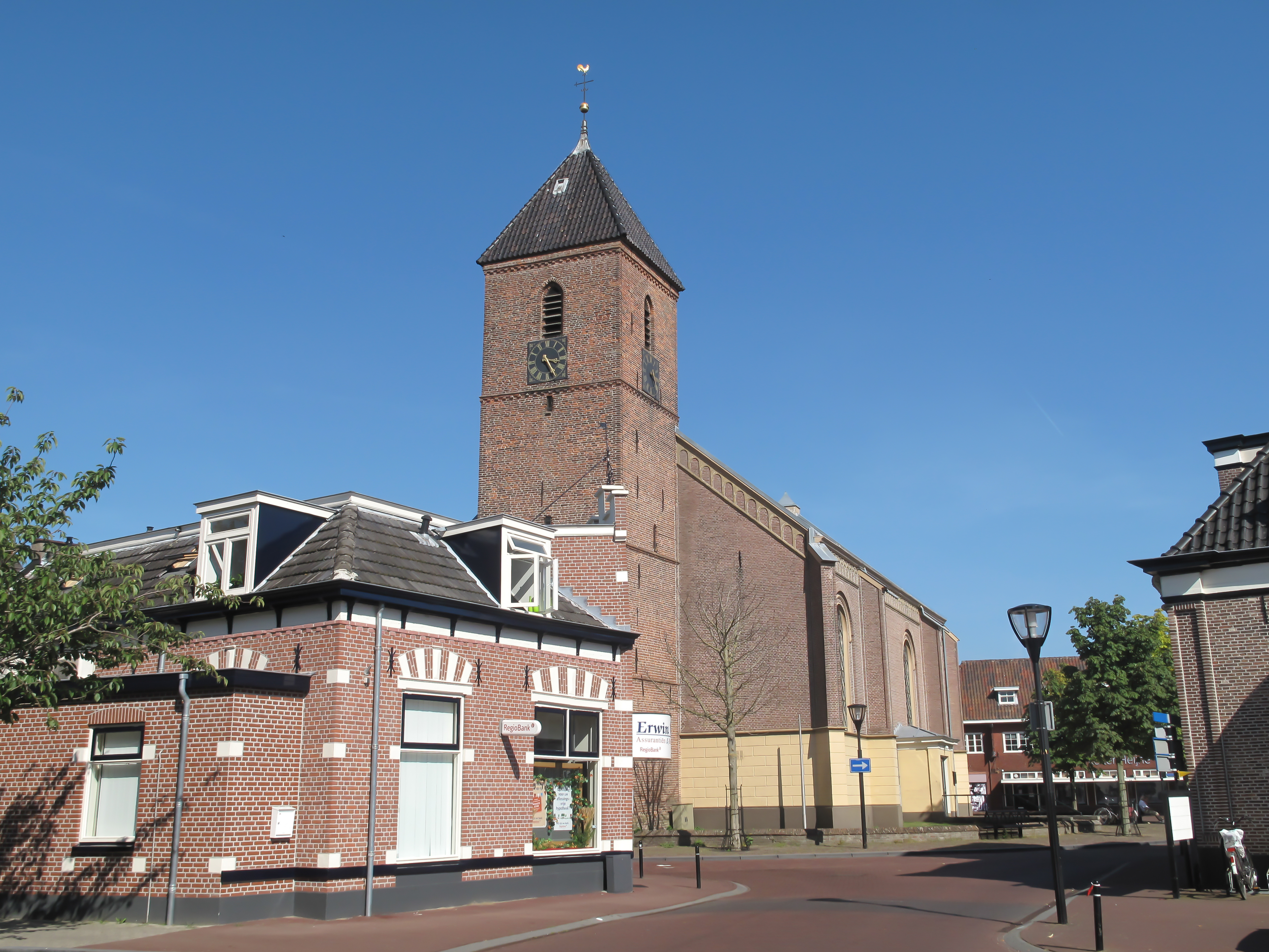
Heino, reformed church:de Zaalkerk

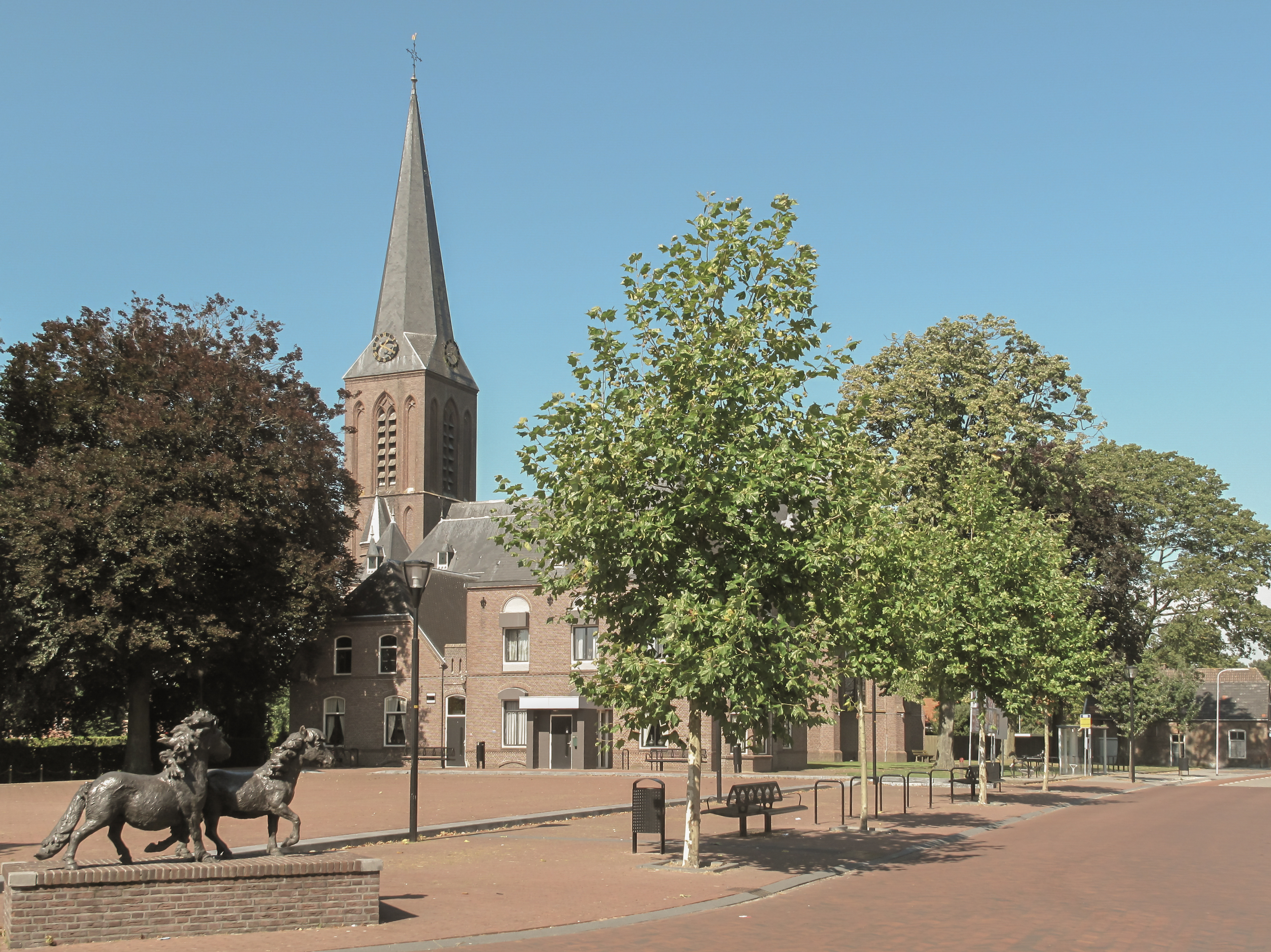
Heeten, church: kerk de Onze Lieve Vrouwe Onbevlekt Ontvangen

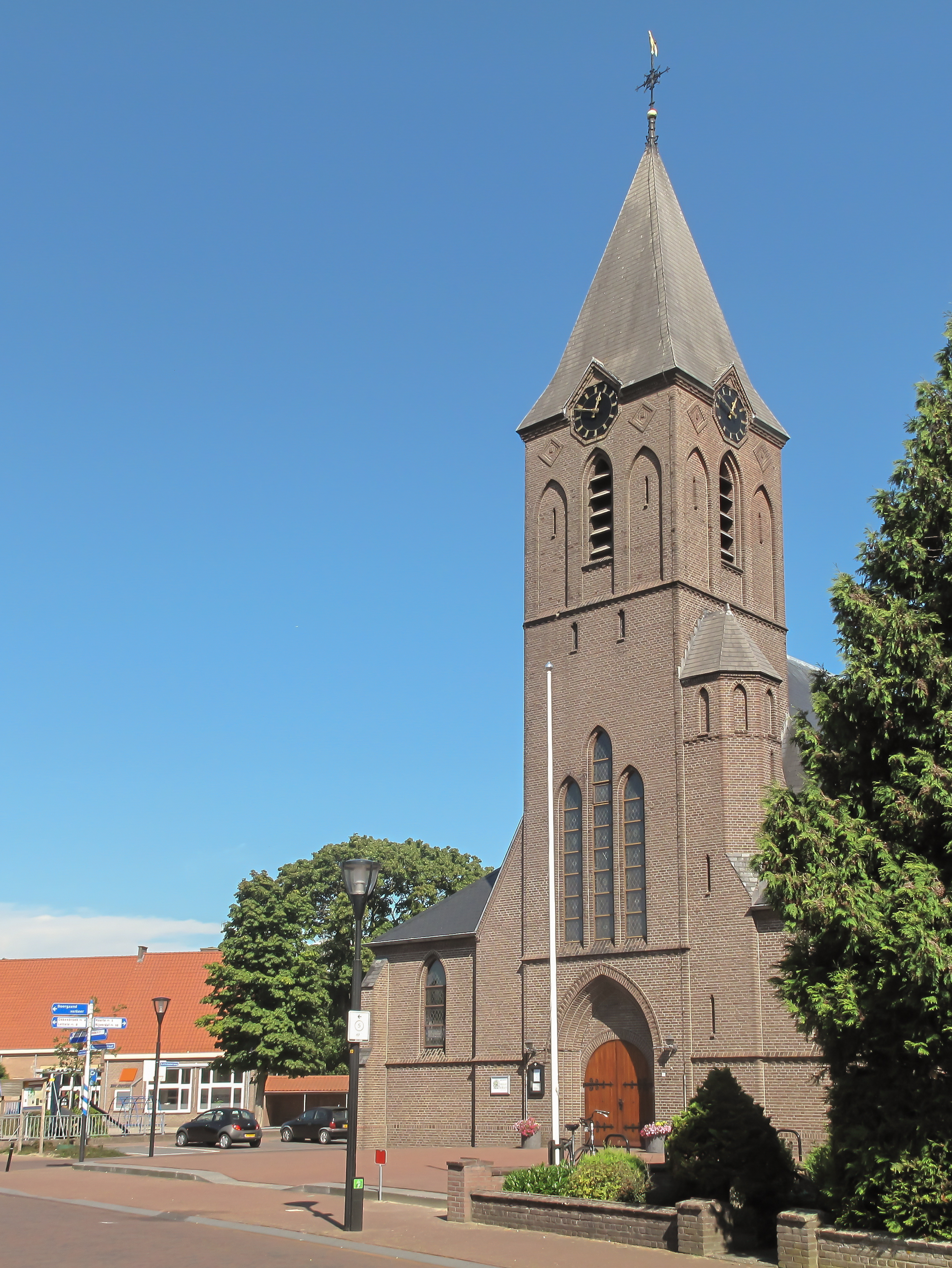
Nieuw Heeten, church: parochiekerk Sint Joseph
