= Heino, Netherlands =

Heino
- Village
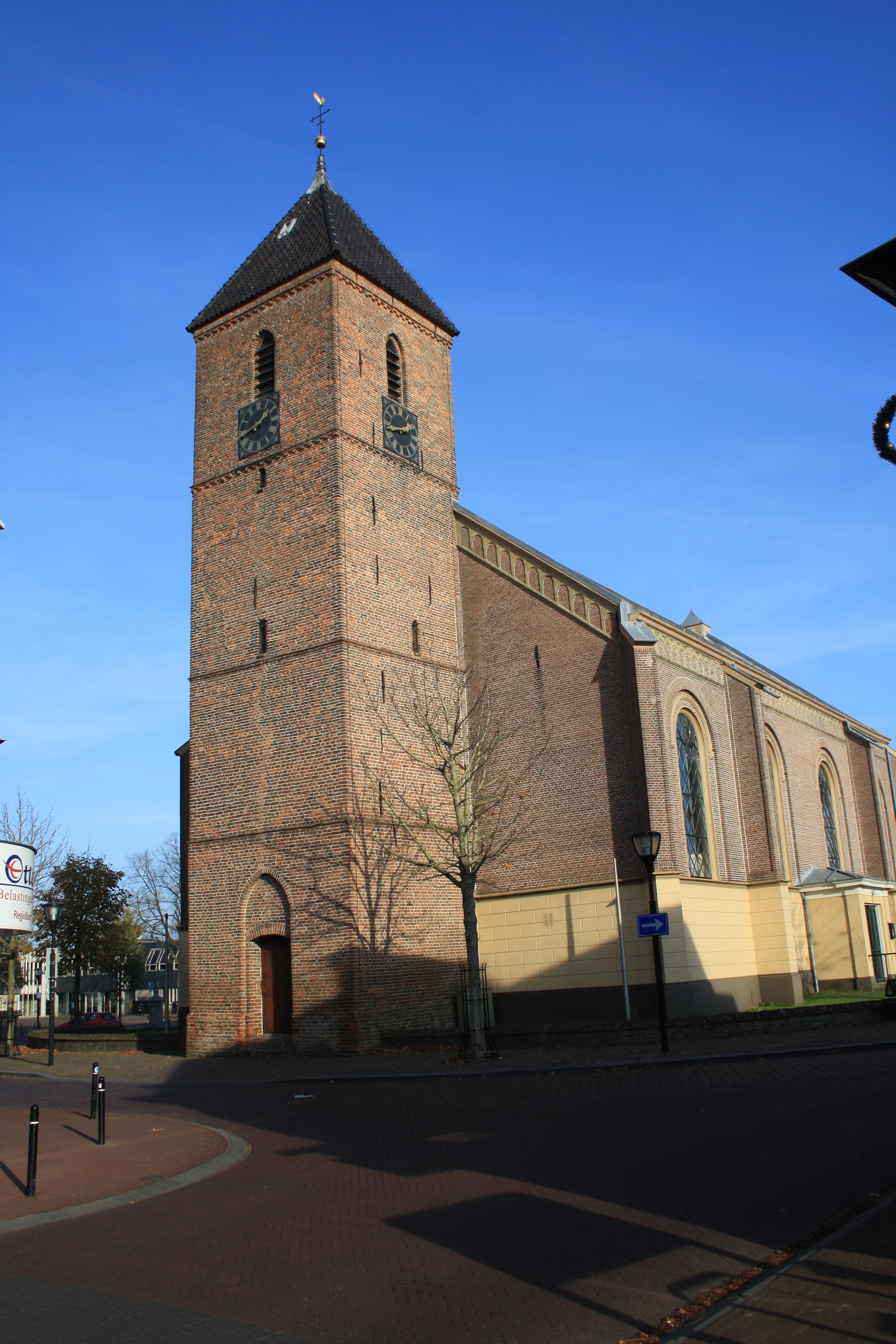
- Heino church: de Nederlands Hervormde Zaalkerk

- Location in province of Overijssel in the Netherlands Heino (Netherlands)
- Coordinates: 52°26′9″N 6°14′2″E
- Country: Netherlands
- Province: Overijssel
- Municipality: Raalte

Area
  - Total: 22.04 km^{2} (8.51 sq mi)
- Elevation: 3.6 m (12 ft)

Population (2021)
  - Total: 7,170
  - Density: 325/km^{2} (843/sq mi)
- Time zone: UTC+1 (CET)
  - Summer (DST): UTC+2 (CEST)
- Postal code: 8141
- Dialing code: 0572
- Website: www.raalte.nl

Heino is a village in the province of Overijssel in the Netherlands. It belongs to the municipality of Raalte and it has 7,080 inhabitants (January 2018). The village has a railway station along the railway Zwolle - Enschede and it can also be reached by the road N35.

Heino was a separate municipality until 2001, when it merged with Raalte to form a new municipality with the name Raalte.

Heino is a very touristic village with many estates and country houses. South-west of Heino, just across the railroad and the border to the municipality Olst-Wijhe, stands the castle Nijenhuis. It hosts an important art museum ( Constant Permeke, Van Gogh et al.). Around the castle is a sculpture garden (Ossip Zadkine et al.).

Every third week of August, the village celebrates the 'Pompdagen' (Pumpdays), named after the local Leugenpompe village pump. This is a series of events advertising local crafts, markets, and folk music, culminating in an event called the "Daggie Old Heino", drawing thousands of tourists to the village.

History

Heino originated from the hamlet of Ter Heyne and was first mentioned in 1236 in a document issued by the Bishop of Utrecht. The settlement developed into a village during the 17th century. For much of its history, Heino was primarily agricultural. Its development accelerated in the early 20th century with the establishment of a dairy factory and a cooperative. Further expansion took place after the Second World War.

Transport

Heino railway station opened in 1881 on the railway line between Zwolle and Almelo. The station continues to provide rail connections in the region.

Nijenhuis Castle

Kasteel Het Nijenhuis is a historic country house located between Heino and Wijhe. It is one of the best-preserved historic country houses in Overijssel and is one of the locations of Museum de Fundatie. The surrounding sculpture garden contains more than 100 sculptures from the collections of Museum de Fundatie, Museum Beelden aan Zee and the Province of Overijssel.

Pompdagen

Pompdagen is an annual festival in Heino held from the third Wednesday of August. The event includes music, a fair, markets, sporting activities and traditional events such as Daggie Old Heino and the Pomptoertocht. The festival is organized by Stichting Heija Heino and has been held since 1988.

Municipal history

Heino was an independent municipality until 1 January 2001, when it became part of the municipality of Raalte as part of a municipal reorganization.

== Climate ==
Climate data for Heino (1991−2020 normals, extremes 1989−present)
Month	Jan	Feb	Mar	Apr	May	Jun	Jul	Aug	Sep	Oct	Nov	Dec	Year
Record high °C (°F)	14.5 (58.1)	19.3 (66.7)	23.7 (74.7)	28.6 (83.5)	31.5 (88.7)	34.7 (94.5)	39.3 (102.7)	35.4 (95.7)	32.2 (90.0)	26.3 (79.3)	19.7 (67.5)	15.0 (59.0)	39.3 (102.7)
Mean daily maximum °C (°F)	5.5 (41.9)	6.5 (43.7)	10.1 (50.2)	14.6 (58.3)	18.2 (64.8)	20.9 (69.6)	23.0 (73.4)	22.7 (72.9)	19.2 (66.6)	14.5 (58.1)	9.5 (49.1)	6.1 (43.0)	14.2 (57.6)
Daily mean °C (°F)	3.0 (37.4)	3.3 (37.9)	5.9 (42.6)	9.3 (48.7)	13.0 (55.4)	15.8 (60.4)	17.9 (64.2)	17.4 (63.3)	14.2 (57.6)	10.5 (50.9)	6.6 (43.9)	3.7 (38.7)	10.0 (50.0)
Mean daily minimum °C (°F)	0.2 (32.4)	0.1 (32.2)	1.6 (34.9)	3.5 (38.3)	7.1 (44.8)	10.2 (50.4)	12.4 (54.3)	11.9 (53.4)	9.4 (48.9)	6.5 (43.7)	3.5 (38.3)	1.0 (33.8)	5.6 (42.1)
Record low °C (°F)	−17.5 (0.5)	−17.9 (−0.2)	−17.2 (1.0)	−7.9 (17.8)	−2.2 (28.0)	−0.1 (31.8)	4.6 (40.3)	4.0 (39.2)	0.0 (32.0)	−6.8 (19.8)	−9.7 (14.5)	−15.4 (4.3)	−17.9 (−0.2)
Average precipitation mm (inches)	66.4 (2.61)	57.0 (2.24)	54.6 (2.15)	40.7 (1.60)	58.4 (2.30)	68.4 (2.69)	81.9 (3.22)	79.8 (3.14)	62.4 (2.46)	67.9 (2.67)	64.8 (2.55)	72.1 (2.84)	774.4 (30.49)
Average relative humidity (%)	88.7	85.5	81.3	76.1	75.5	77.1	78.7	81.0	84.8	87.1	90.1	90.1	83.0
Mean monthly sunshine hours	62.9	92.5	141.8	191.8	214.1	205.1	215.7	194.4	154.2	119.9	65.3	54.9	1,712.6
Percentage possible sunshine	24.6	33.0	38.4	45.9	43.9	40.8	42.7	42.6	40.4	36.3	24.7	22.5	36.3
Source: Royal Netherlands Meteorological Institute
