= Raalte railway station =

Railway station in the Netherlands

Raalte
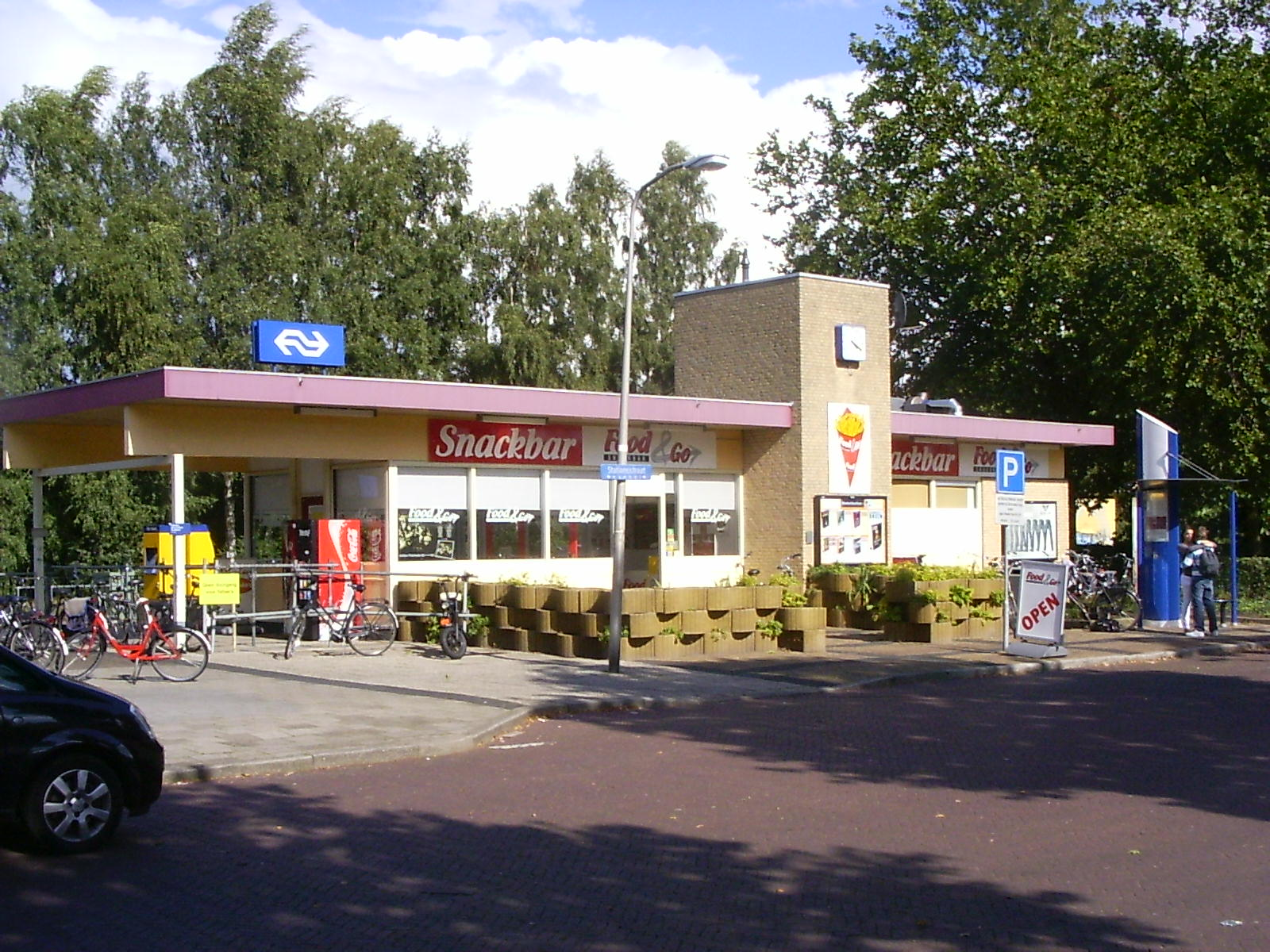

General information
- Location: Netherlands
- Coordinates: 52°23′27″N 6°16′43″E
- Line: Zwolle–Almelo railway

History
- Opened: 1 January 1881

Services
Preceding station	Keolis Nederland	Following station
Heino towards Zwolle	Sprinter 7900	Nijverdal towards Enschede
Zwolle Terminus	Intercity 17900 Not on evenings or weekends	Nijverdal towards Enschede
Location
- Location within Netherlands

Raalte is a railway station located in Raalte, Netherlands. The station originally opened on 1 January 1881 and is located on the Zwolle–Almelo railway. The train services are currently operated by Keolis Nederland. Between 1910 and 1935, there was also a railway line between Deventer and Ommen which crossed the Zwolle–Almelo railway at Raalte.

== Train services ==
Route	Service type	Operator	Notes
Zwolle - Almelo - Hengelo - Enschede	Local ("Stoptrein")	Keolis Nederland	2x per hour

== Bus services ==
Line	Route	Operator	Notes
162	Raalte - Lemelerveld - Dalfsen	Syntus Overijssel	Mon-Fri only.
165	Raalte - Pleegste - Wesepe - Schalkhaar - Deventer	Syntus Overijssel	
166	Raalte - Heino - Lenthe - Wijthmen - Zwolle	Syntus Overijssel	Mon-Fri only. One morning run is operated with a coach type of bus.
513	Nijverdal - Haarle - Raalte	Twents	1x 1,5 hour - no service on evenings and weekends.
516	Olst - Boskamp - Eikelhof - Wesepe - Heeten - Raalte	Syntus Overijssel	1x 90 min - No service on evenings and Sundays.
563	Raalte - Broekland - Tongeren - Wijhe	Syntus Overijssel	No service on evenings and Sundays.
