= Zwolle–Almelo railway =

Railway line in the Netherlands

Zwolle-Almelo railway
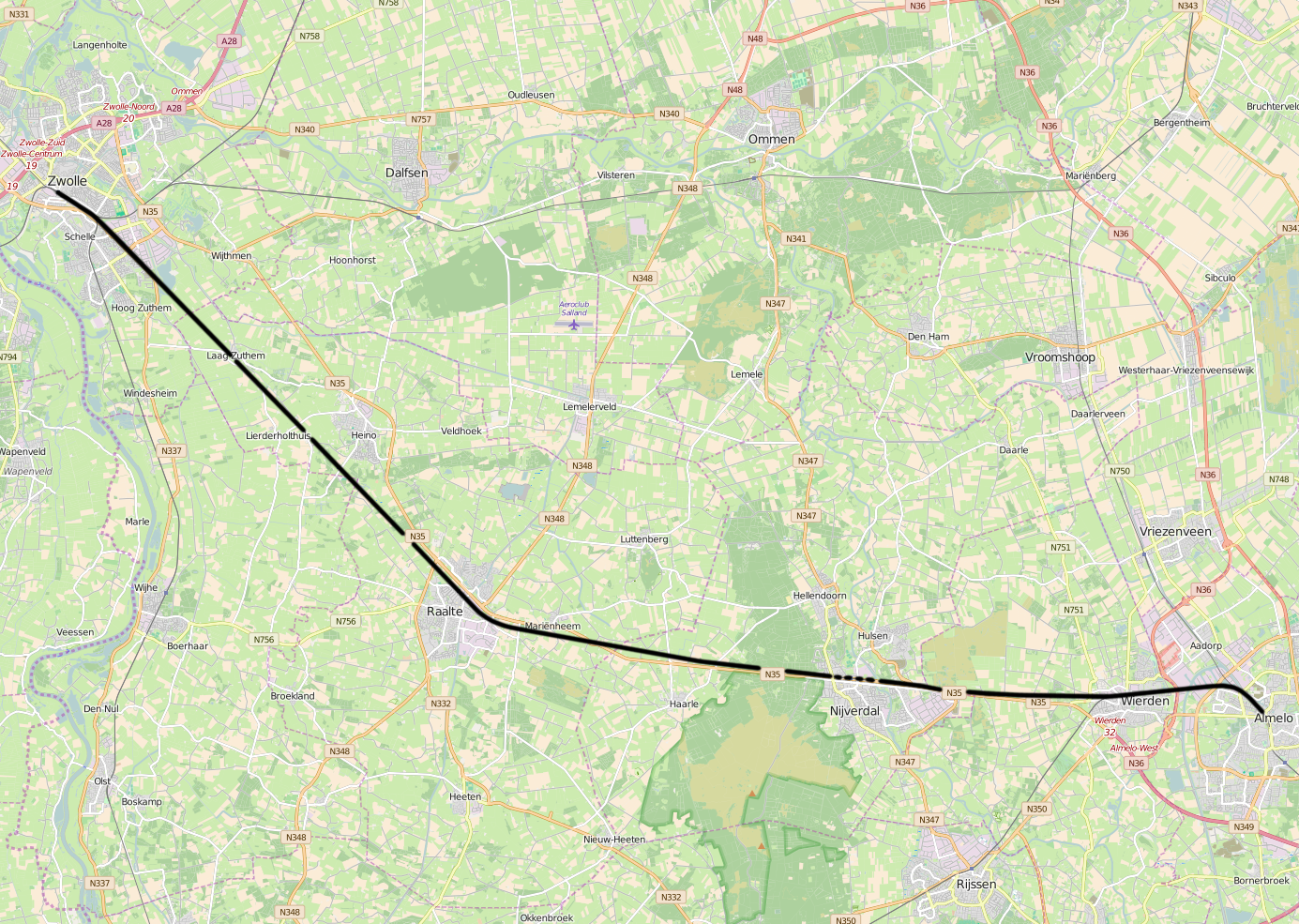

Overview
- Status: Operational
- Locale: Netherlands
- Termini: Zwolle railway station; Almelo railway station
- Stations: 6

Service
- Operator(s): Zwolle - Almelo: Keolis Nederland; Wierden - Almelo: Nederlandse Spoorwegen

History
- Opened: 1 January 1881

Technical
- Line length: 44.8 km (27.8 mi)
- Number of tracks: Zwolle - Wierden: Single track Wierden - Almelo: Double track
- Track gauge: 1,435 mm (4 ft 8 1/2 in) standard gauge
- Electrification: 1.5 kV DC; Zwolle - Wierden: 2016-2017; Wierden - Almelo: 1951
- Operating speed: Zwolle - Wierden: 140 km/h (87 mph); Wierden - Almelo: 130 km/h (81 mph)

The Zwolle–Almelo railway is a regional railway line, that connects Zwolle with Almelo, Netherlands.

== History ==
The railway was part of the third national construction period of railways in the Netherlands. This last phase of railway construction saw mostly the appearance of local and regional railways. With the Zwolle–Almelo railway, Zwolle and the northernmost provinces were offered a direct link to the Almelo-Salzbergen railway.

== Route ==
The railway leaves Zwolle in southeastern direction and continues in a straight line to the town of Raalte. There it curves towards Nijverdal, where the railway continues underground for 1500 meters, as part of the Salland-Twente tunnel. It then continues to Wierden, where it merges with the Deventer-Almelo railway and continues to Almelo.

== Train services ==
The entire length of the railway is served Sprinter services between Zwolle and Enschede, calling at every station. Since 10 December 2017 an express train runs between Enschede and Raalte, which is intended to continue to Zwolle after track upgrades.

The section between Wierden and Almelo is additionally served by Sprinter services on the Deventer-Almelo railway. IC services to and from Deventer do run on section between Wierden and Almelo, but as these do not stop at Wierden they are not usable for passengers on this stretch.

== Train Types ==
NS Before electrification, the NS Buffel was the only train type to be found on the Zwolle–Wierden part of the line. Since 10 December 2017 these have been replaced by electric FLIRT3 trainsets operated by Keolis Nederland. Between Wierden and Almelo DD-AR and SGMm trains operate in Sprinter services and ICMm and VIRM can be seen using the line
