= Deventer–Almelo railway =

Railway line in the Netherlands

Deventer-Almelo railway
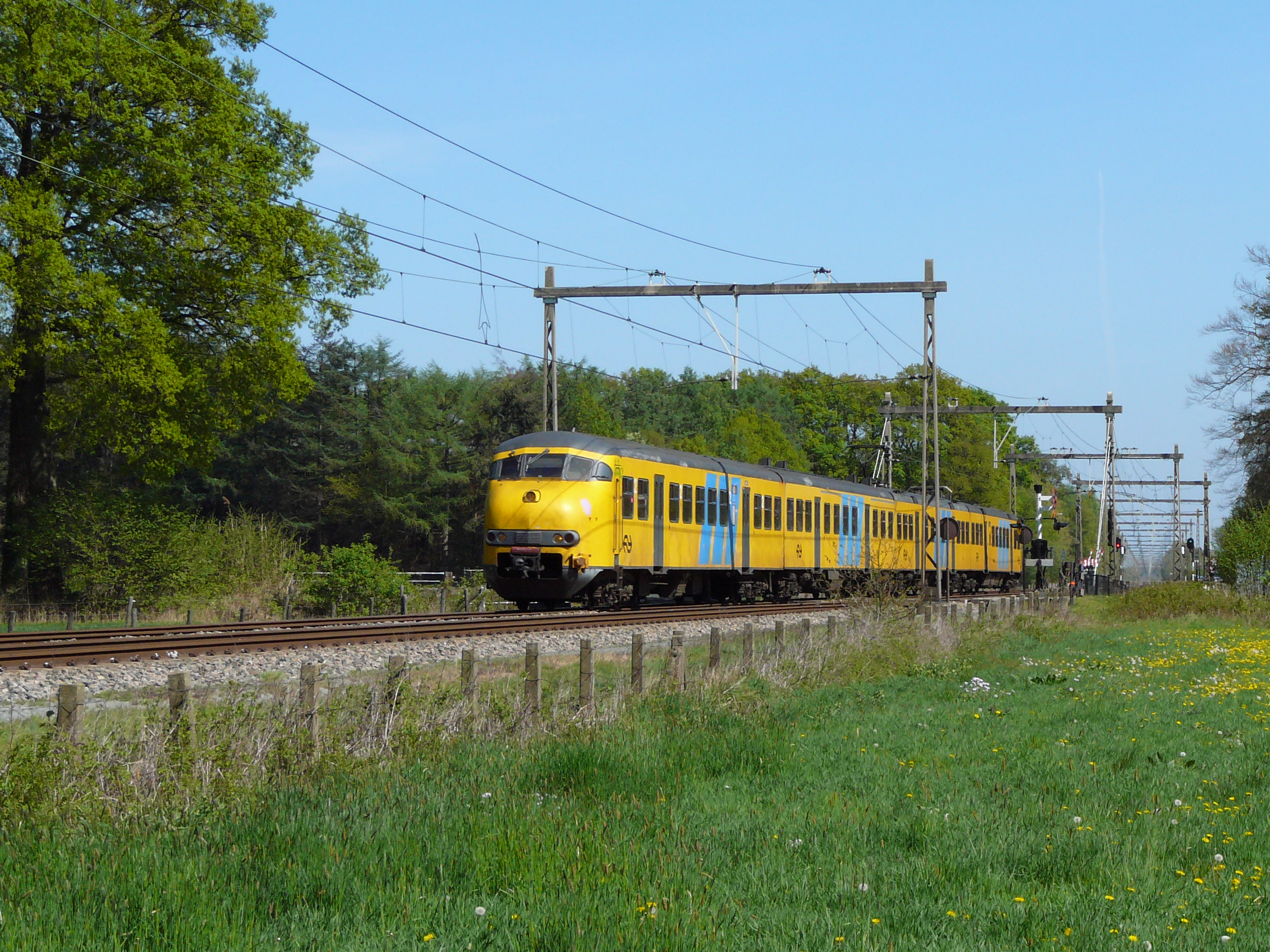
- A NS Mat '64 before arriving at Deventer

Overview
- Status: Operational
- Locale: Netherlands
- Termini: Deventer railway station; Almelo railway station
- Stations: 6

Service
- Operator(s): Nederlandse Spoorwegen

History
- Opened: 1 September 1888

Technical
- Line length: 38.5 km (23.9 mi)
- Number of tracks: Double track
- Track gauge: 1,435 mm (4 ft 8 1/2 in) standard gauge
- Electrification: 1.5 kV DC
- Operating speed: 130 km/h (81 mph)

The Deventer–Almelo railway is an important Dutch railway line, that connects Deventer with Almelo, Netherlands.

== History ==
The railway was opened by the Koninklijke Nederlandsche Locaalspoorweg-Maatschappij (KNLS) on 1 September 1888, with construction starting in 1887. When the line opened it offered a direct link to Germany via the Almelo-Salzbergen railway. The line was electrified in 1951.

== Route ==
The line leaves Deventer in an easterly direction towards Almelo, shortly after leaving, the Staatslijn A to Zutphen leaves in a southerly direction. The line continues travelling through the countryside and a few towns. At Wierden the line from Zwolle joins on and the line continues. On approaching Almelo the line from Mariënberg also joins. The station arrives at Almelo, where the railway becomes the Almelo-Salzbergen railway continues east.

== Train services ==
The Deventer–Almelo railway is used by the following passenger services:

- International services on the whole line (Schiphol - Berlin)
- Intercity services on the whole line (Schiphol/The Hague/Rotterdam - Enschede)
- Stoptrein services on the whole line (Apeldoorn - Enschede)

== Train types ==
A wide variety of trains can be found regularly on the Almelo-Salzbergen railway:

- NS Class 1700 on the Schiphol - Berlin service on the whole line
- NS Koploper on the Schiphol/The Hague/Rotterdam - Enschede on the whole line
- NS Sprinter on the Apeldoorn - Enschede service on the whole line
- NS Buffel on the Zwolle - Enschede service between Wierden and Almelo

There are also large numbers of freight trains operating along the line.

== Gallery ==
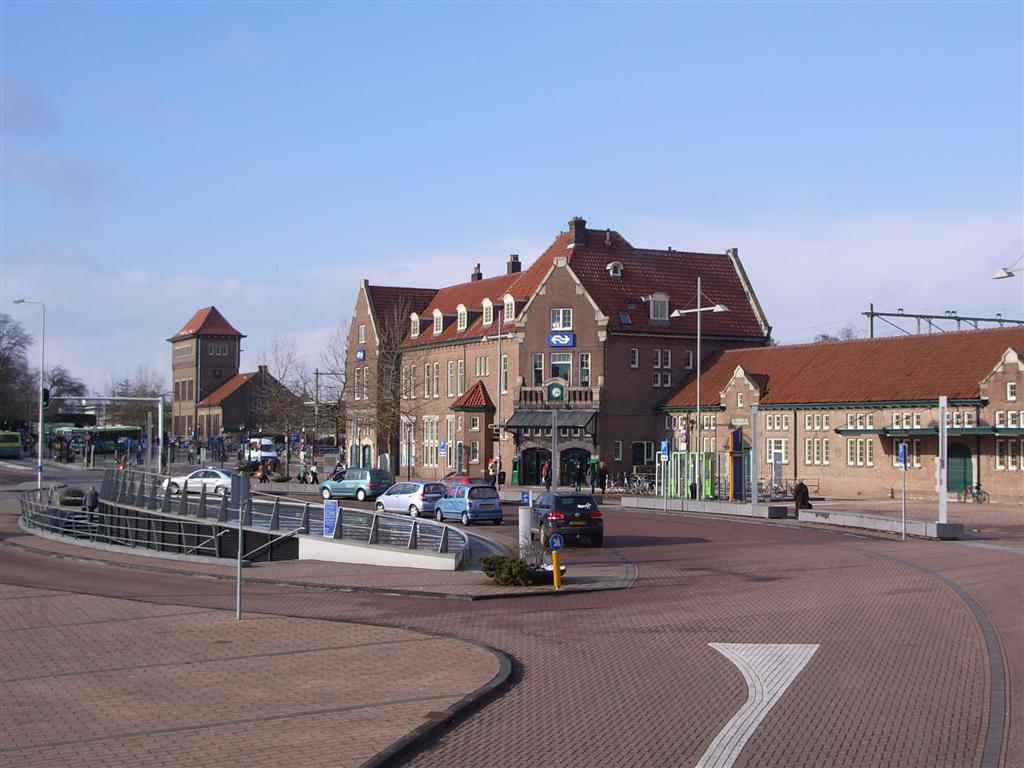
Deventer railway station

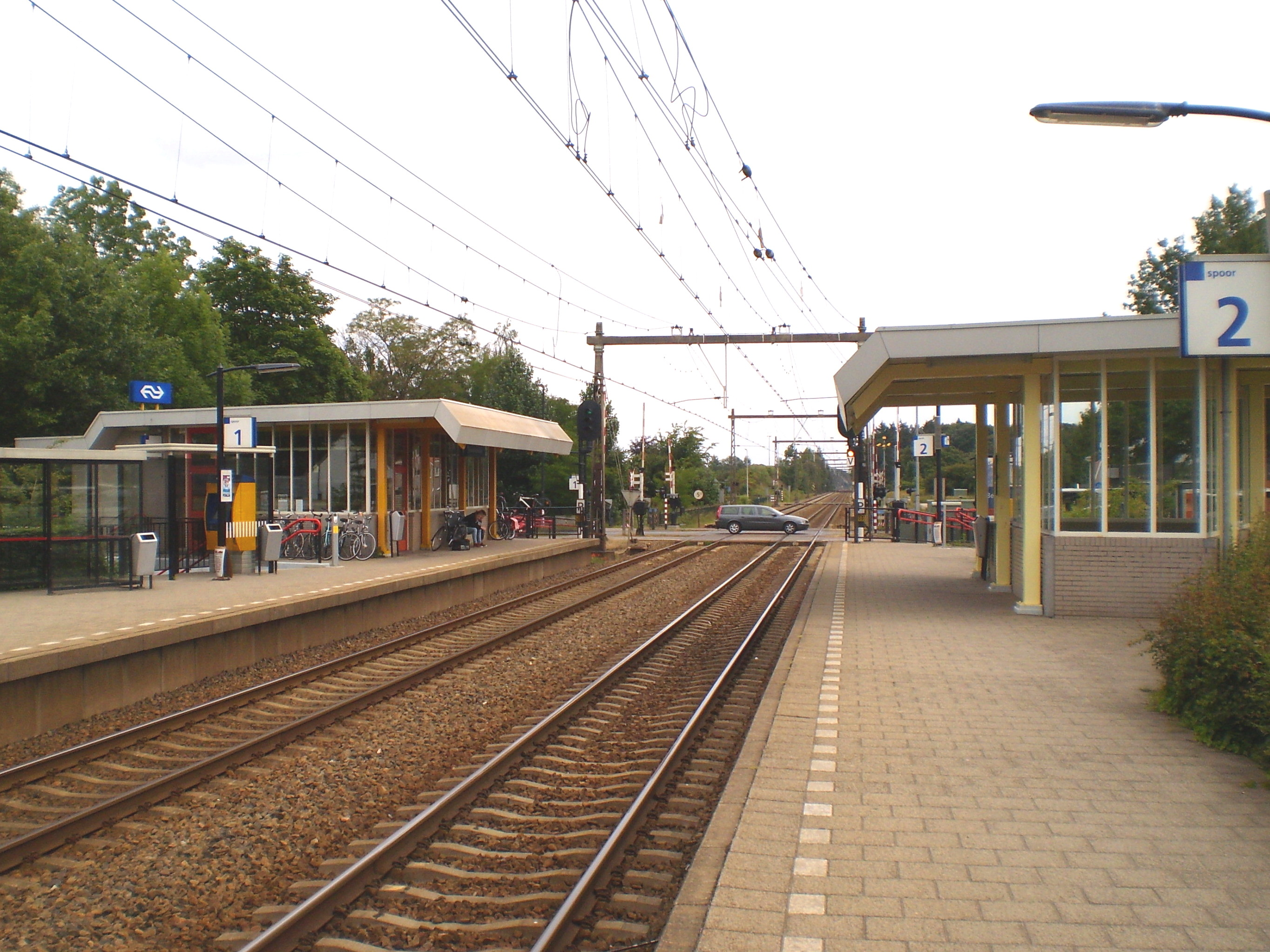
Deventer Colmschate railway station

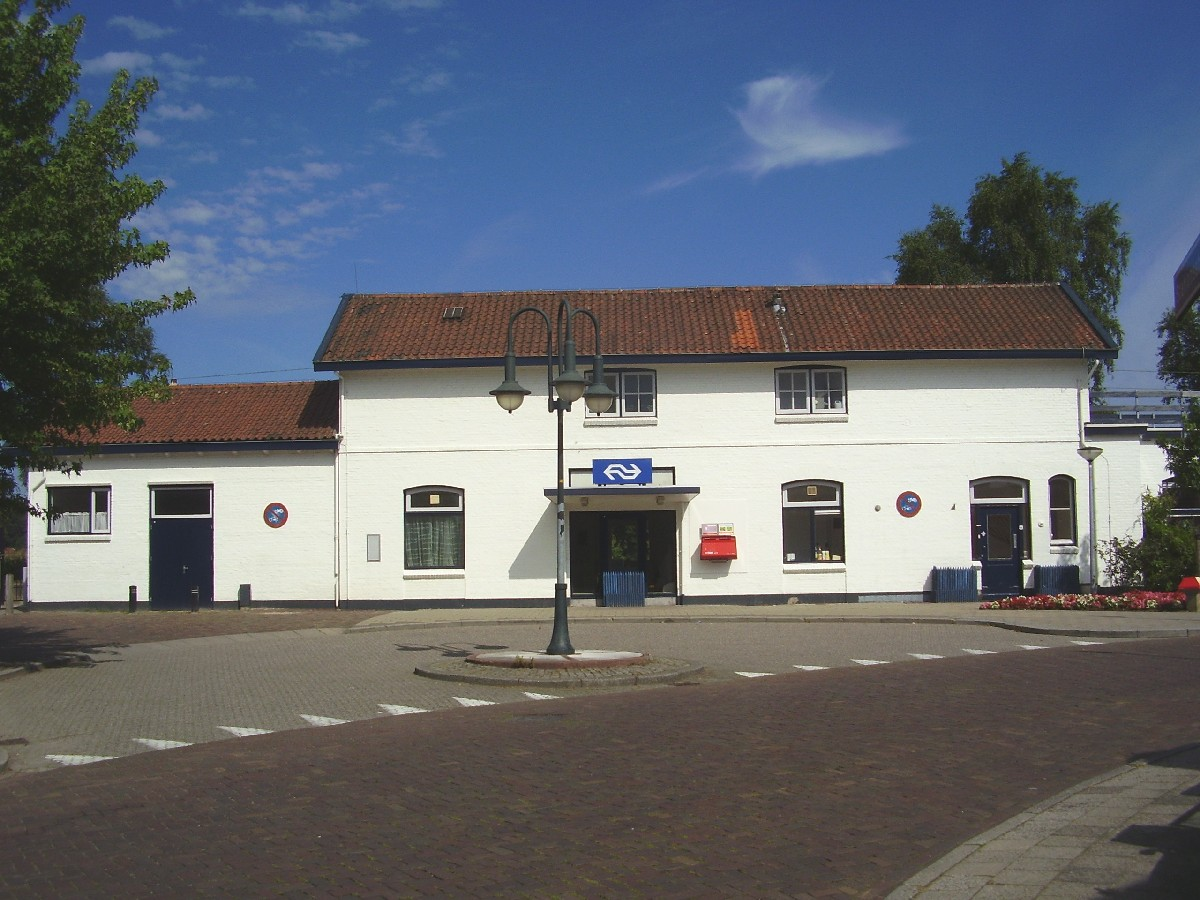
Holten railway station

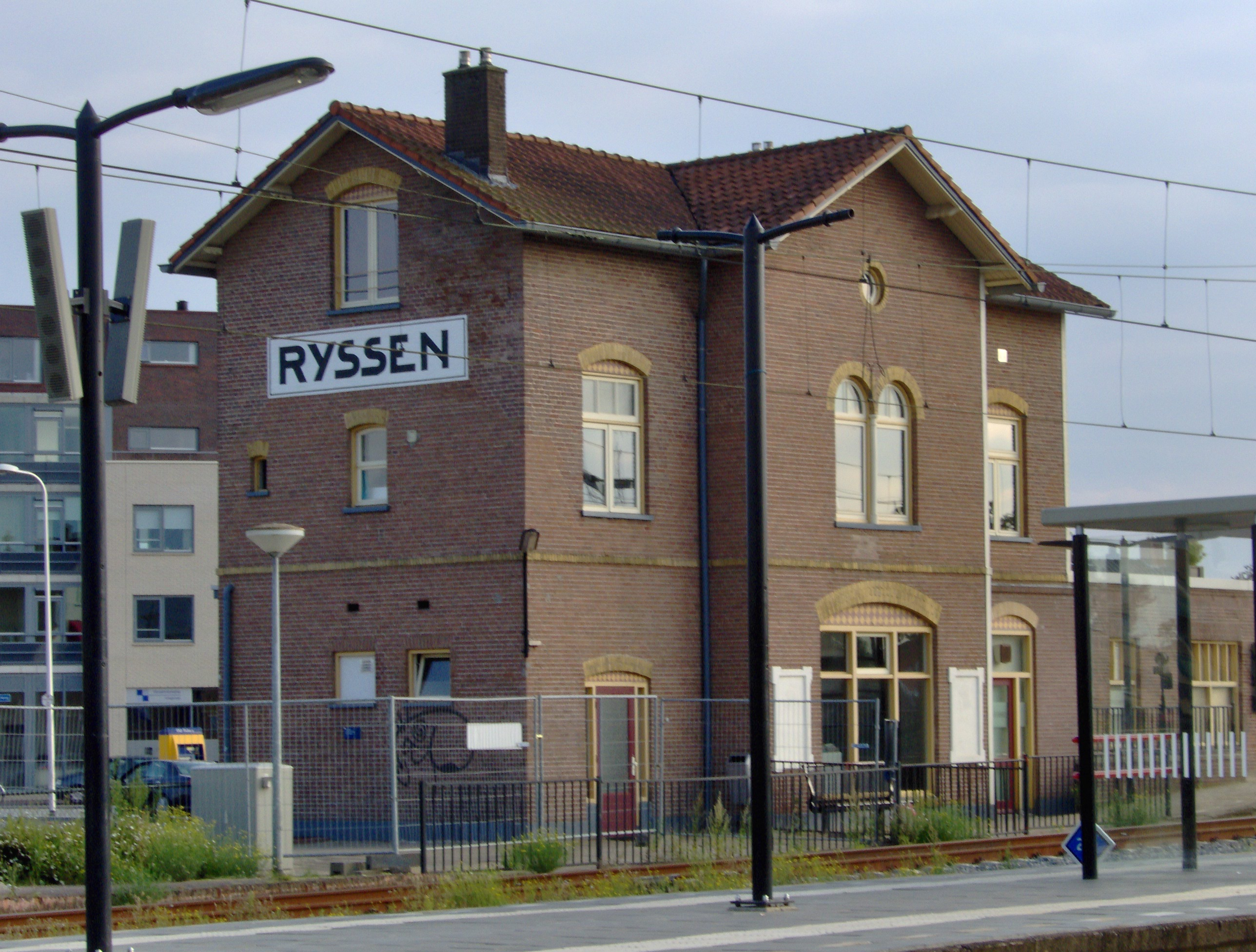
Rijssen railway station

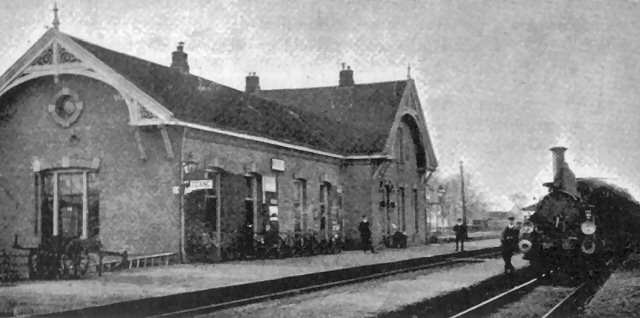
Wierden railway station

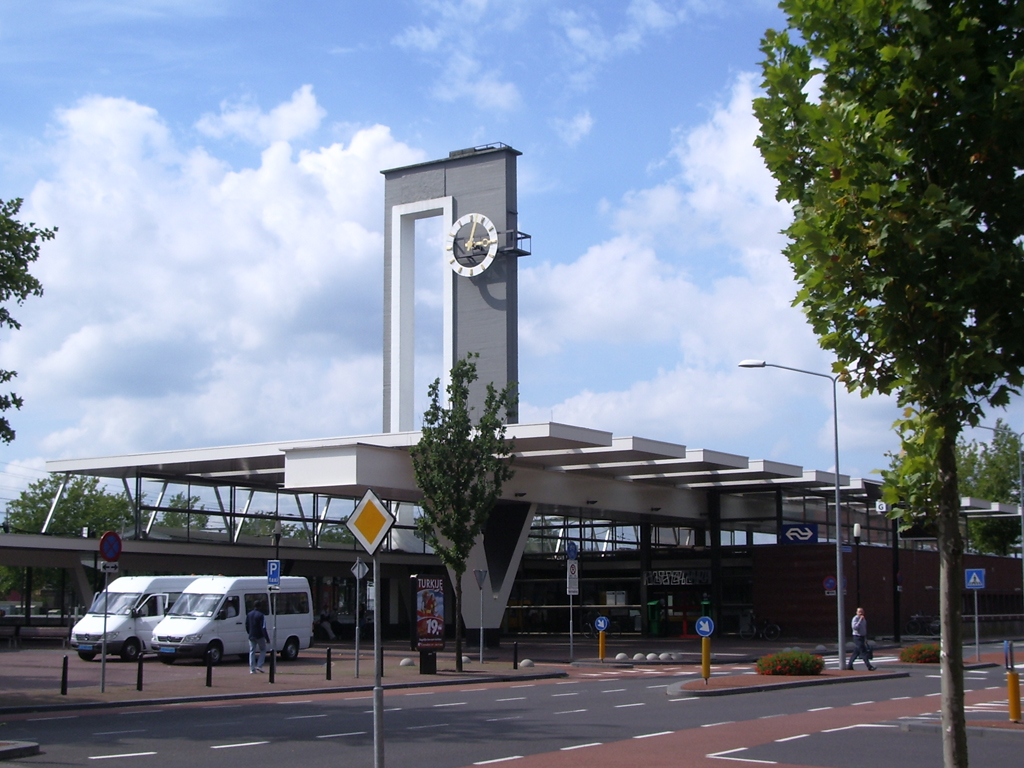
Almelo railway station
