= Daarlerveen railway station =

Railway station in the Netherlands

Daarlerveen
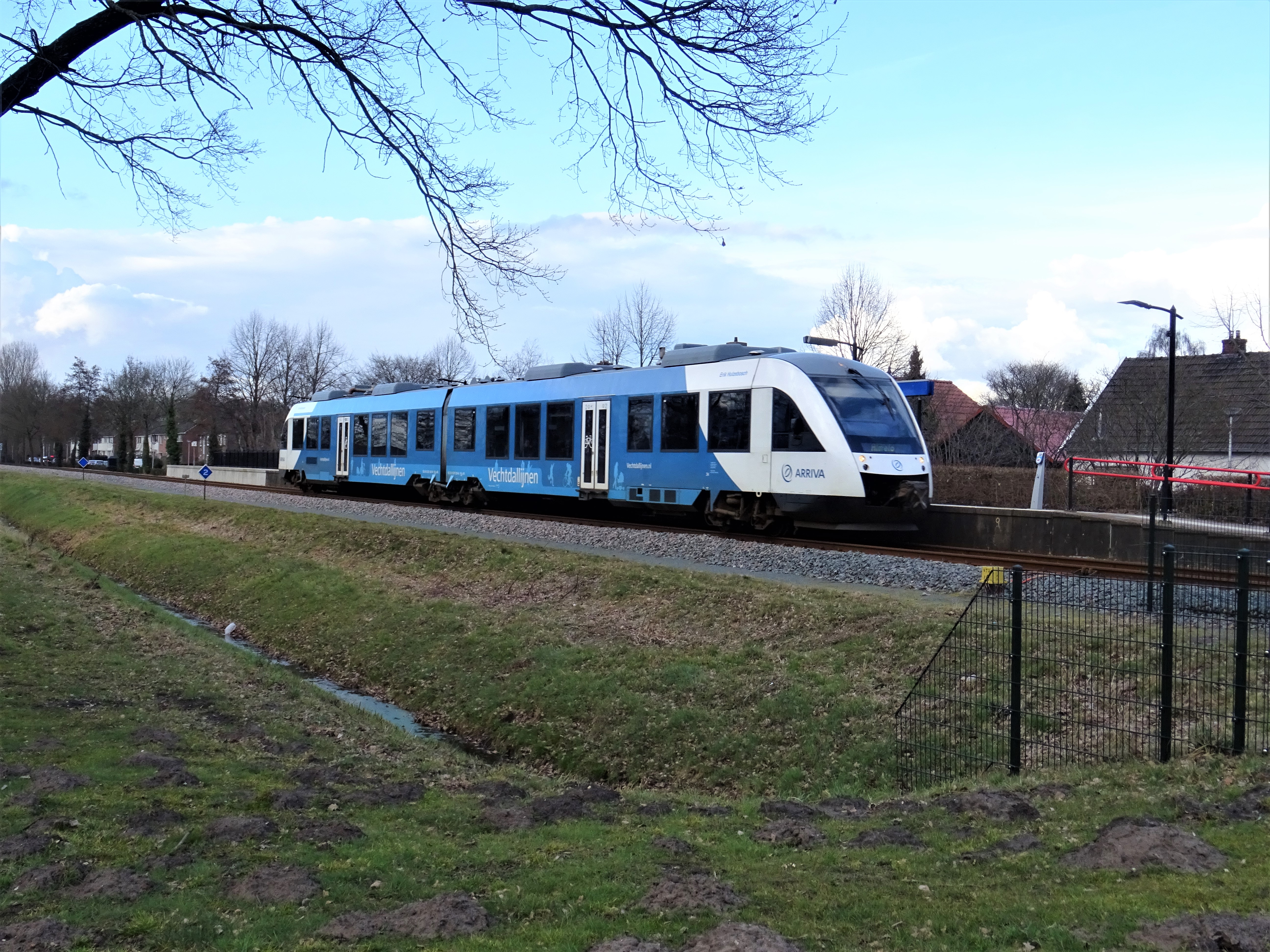
- Daarlerveen railway station in March 2018

General information
- Location: Netherlands
- Coordinates: 52°26′28″N 6°34′33″E
- Line: Mariënberg–Almelo railway

History
- Opened: 1 October 1906

Services
Preceding station	Arriva Netherlands	Following station
Vroomshoop towards Hardenberg	Stoptrein 31000	Vriezenveen towards Almelo
Location
- Location within Netherlands

Daarlerveen is a railway station in Daarlerveen, The Netherlands. The station was opened on 1 October 1906 and is on the single track Mariënberg–Almelo railway. The line is primarily used by school children in the morning and afternoon. The station has 2 platforms, but one line, because there is a level crossing in between. The train runs over the level crossing first and then stops on the platform. This is so that the level crossing doesn't have to be closed while the train waits.

The station is also used by people of Daarle and Westerhaar-Vriezenveensewijk.

Previously, this station was called Boldijk (1906-1910) and Daarle (1910-1958).

== Train services ==
Route	Service type	Operator	Notes
Almelo - Mariënberg - Hardenberg	Local ("Stoptrein")	Arriva	1x per hour - 2x per hour during rush hours and on Saturday afternoons

=== Platforms ===
- Platform 1a is the northern one, with the service to Mariënberg.
- Platform 1b is the southern one, with the service to Almelo.

== Bus services ==
Line	Route	Operator	Notes
594	Den Ham/Daarlerveen - Daarle - Hellendoorn - Hulsen - Nijverdal	Twents	No service on evenings and Sundays.
