= Vroomshoop railway station =

Railway station in the Netherlands

Vroomshoop
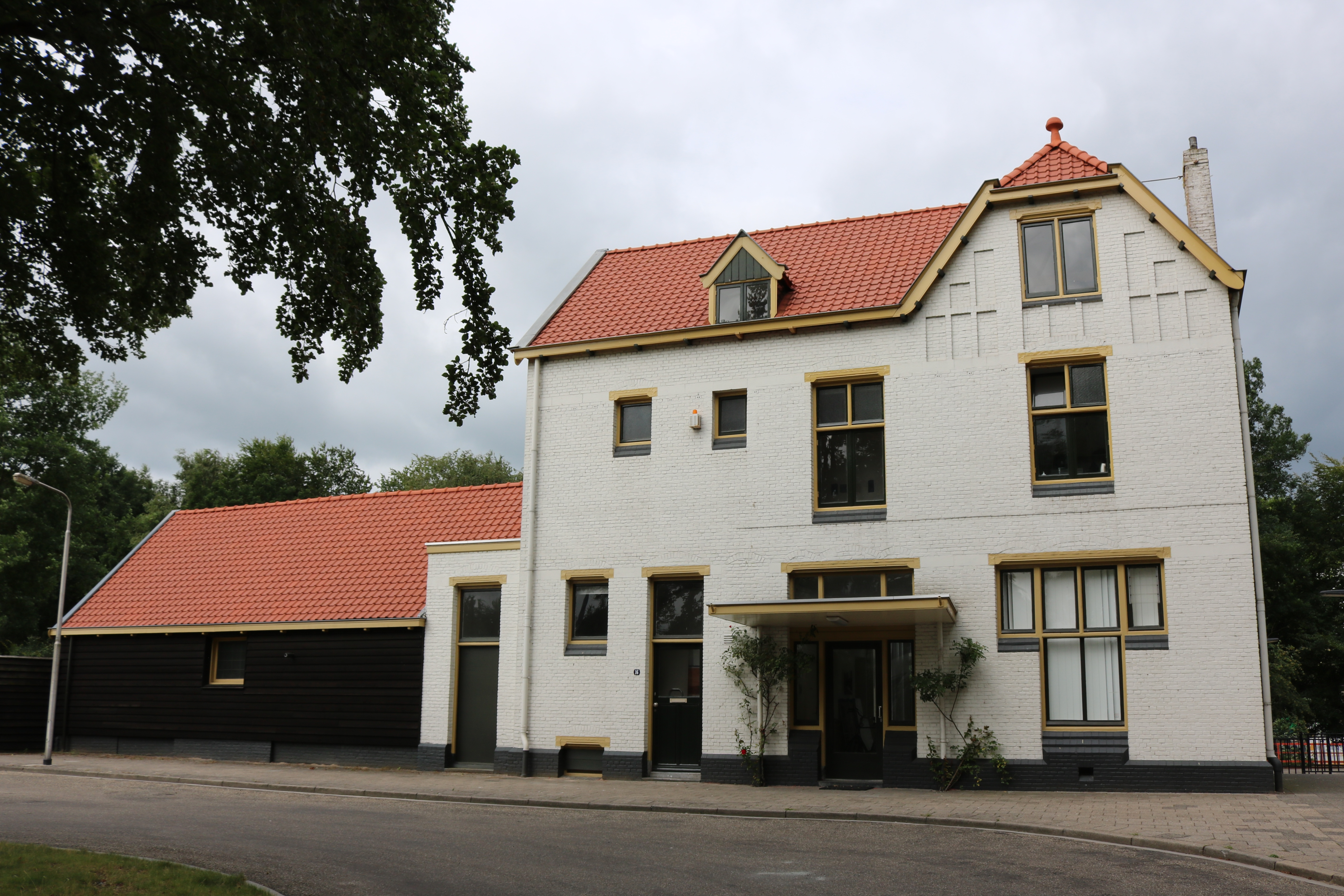

General information
- Location: Netherlands
- Coordinates: 52°26′28″N 6°34′33″E
- Line: Mariënberg–Almelo railway

History
- Opened: 1 October 1906

Services
Preceding station	Arriva Netherlands	Following station
Mariënberg towards Hardenberg	Stoptrein 31000	Daarlerveen towards Almelo
Location
- Location within Netherlands

Vroomshoop is a railway station in Vroomshoop, The Netherlands. The station was opened on 1 October 1906 and is on the single track Mariënberg–Almelo railway. The line is primarily used by school children in the morning and afternoon. The station has 2 platforms. With an average of 100 passengers per day, it is one of the least used stations in the Netherlands. The train services are operated by Arriva.

Previously, this station was called Den Ham-Vroomshoop (1906-1952).

== Train services ==
Route	Service type	Operator	Notes
Almelo - Mariënberg - Hardenberg	Local ("Stoptrein")	Arriva	1x per hour - 2x per hour during rush hours and on Saturday afternoons

== Bus services ==
There is no normal bus service at this station. The nearest bus stops are Tonnendijk (direction: Westerhaar) and Koningin Beatrixstraat (direction: Den Ham) on the Hammerweg.

However, there is an emergency bus stop.
