= Vriezenveen railway station =

Railway station in the Netherlands

Vriezenveen
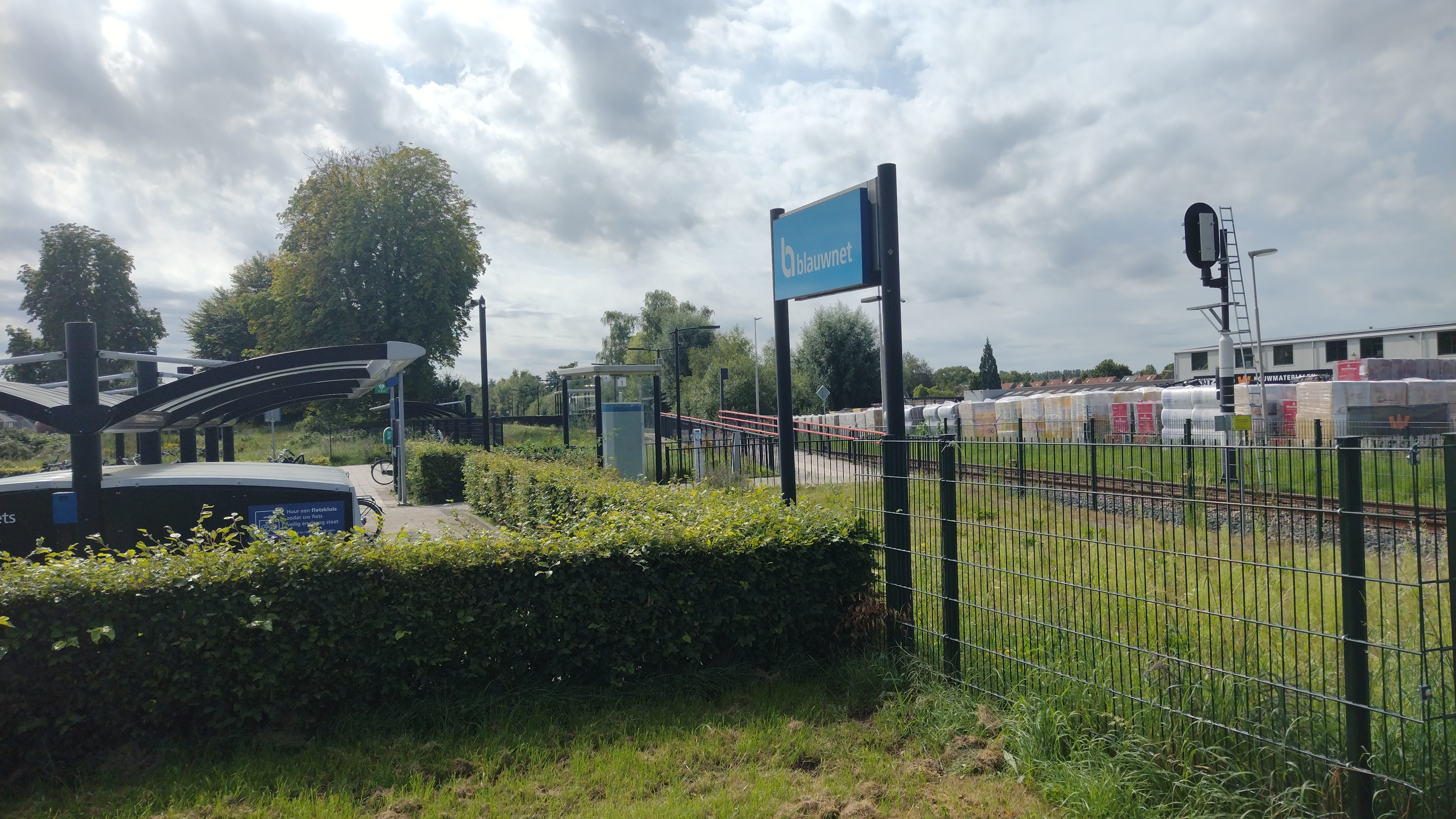

General information
- Location: Netherlands
- Coordinates: 52°24′07″N 6°36′01″E
- Line: Mariënberg–Almelo railway

History
- Opened: 1 October 1906

Services
| Preceding station | Arriva Netherlands | Following station |
|---|---|---|
| Daarlerveen towards Hardenberg | Stoptrein 31000 | Almelo Terminus |
Location
- Location within Netherlands

Vriezenveen is a railway station in Vriezenveen, The Netherlands. The station was opened on 1 October 1906 and is on the single track Mariënberg–Almelo railway. The line is primarily used by school children in the mornings and afternoons. The train services are operated by Arriva.

== Train services ==
| Route | Service type | Operator | Notes |
|---|---|---|---|
| Almelo - Mariënberg - Hardenberg | Local ("Stoptrein") | Arriva | 1x per hour - 2x per hour during rush hours and on Saturday afternoons |

== Bus services ==
There is no bus service at this station. The nearest bus stop is De Merel, 15 minutes away (by walking) from the station.
