= Daarlerveen =

- Village
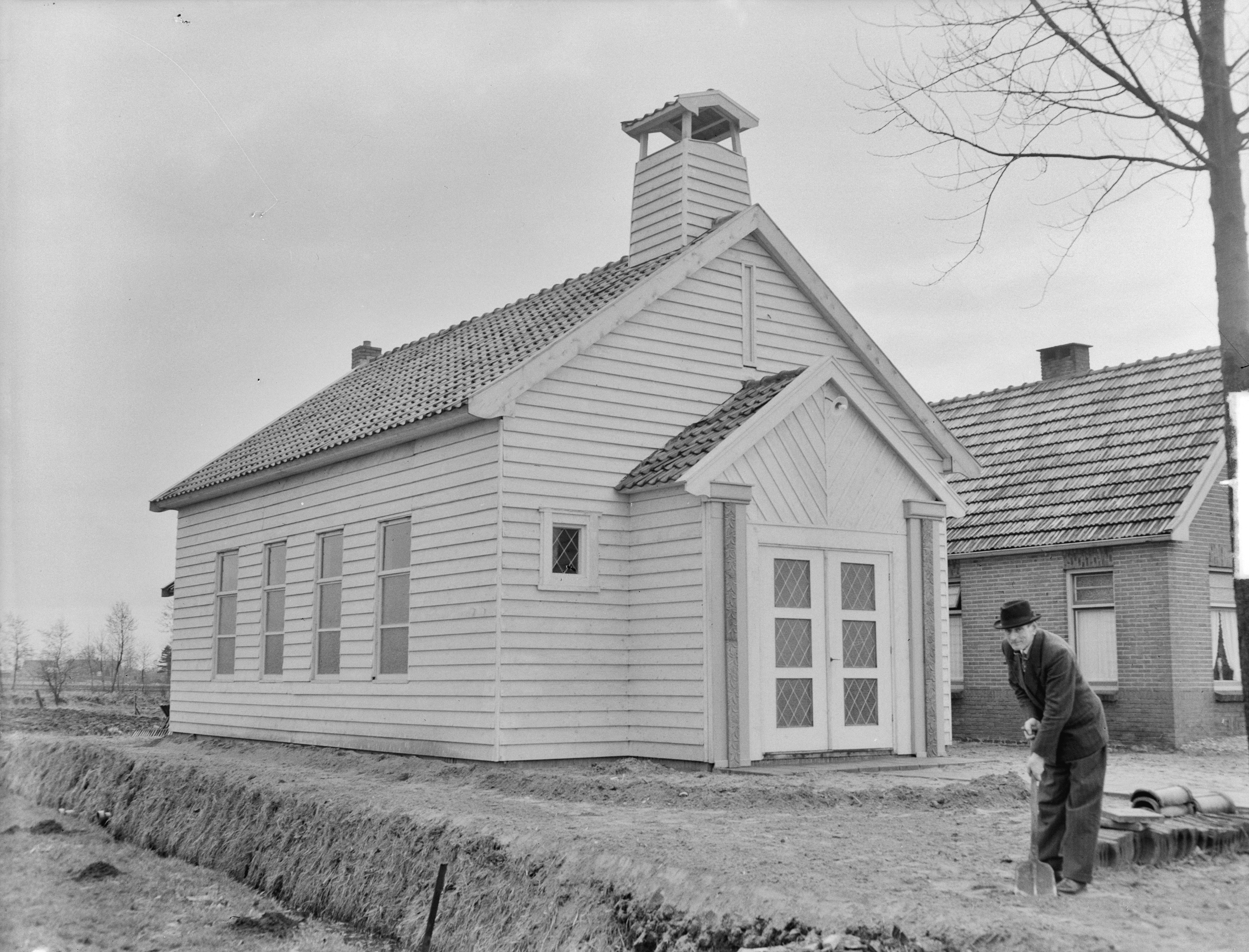
- Church of Daarlerveen

- Flag

- Location in the province of Overijssel in the Netherlands Daarlerveen (Netherlands)
- Coordinates: 52°26′31″N 6°34′36″E
- Country: Netherlands
- Province: Overijssel
- Municipality: Hellendoorn

Area
  - Total: 4.09 km^{2} (1.58 sq mi)
- Elevation: 10 m (33 ft)

Population (2021)
  - Total: 420
  - Density: 100/km^{2} (270/sq mi)
- Time zone: UTC+1 (CET)
  - Summer (DST): UTC+2 (CEST)
- Postal code: 7687
- Dialing code: 0546

Daarlerveen is a village in the Dutch province of Overijssel. It is located in the municipality of Hellendoorn, about 2 km south of the town of Vroomshoop.

== History ==
The village was first mentioned between 1851 and 1855 as Daarler Veen, and means "peat excavation settlement belonging to Daarle". In 1850, the Overijssels Kanaal was dug, and excavation of the raised bog to east of Daarle started. During the excavation several archaeological finds were discovered including a wooden bridge and a canoe.

In 1906, a railway station opened in Daarlerveen on the Mariënberg to Almelo railway line. The Dutch Reformed church is wooden aisleless church built in 1937 with a modest tower.

On 30 November 1944, the Sicherheitsdienst discovered ƒ46 million (~€300 million in 2021) in a hay stack in Daarlerveen. The money had been stolen during a bank robbery of the Dutch Resistance from a bank in Almelo on 15 November 1944, and was intended to finance strikes. At the time, it was the biggest bank robbery in the history of the Netherlands. Nine people were arrested. Only the barkeeper Frielink survived the war; the others died in Neuengamme concentration camp and Reiherhorst, part of Wöbbelin concentration camp.

== Transportation ==
- Daarlerveen railway station

== Gallery ==
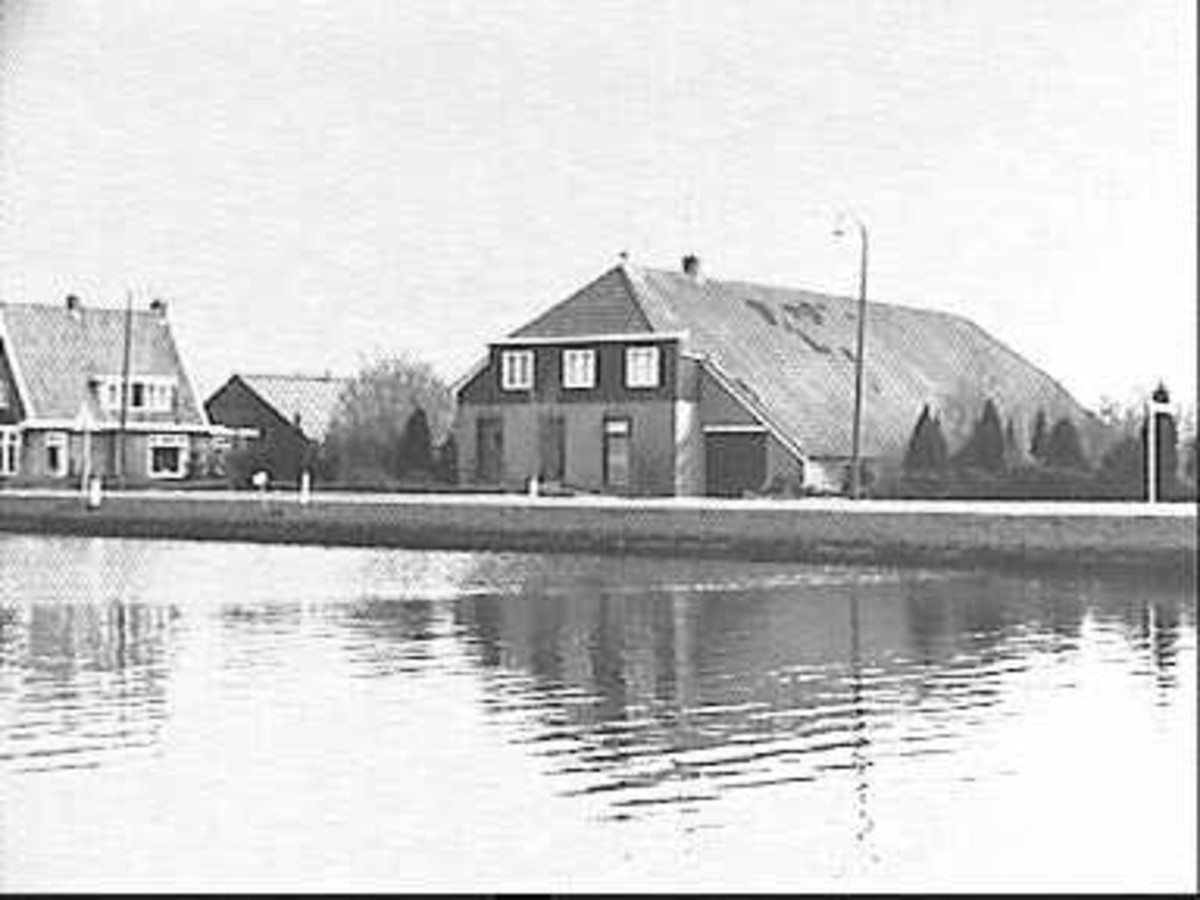
Farm in Daarlerveen

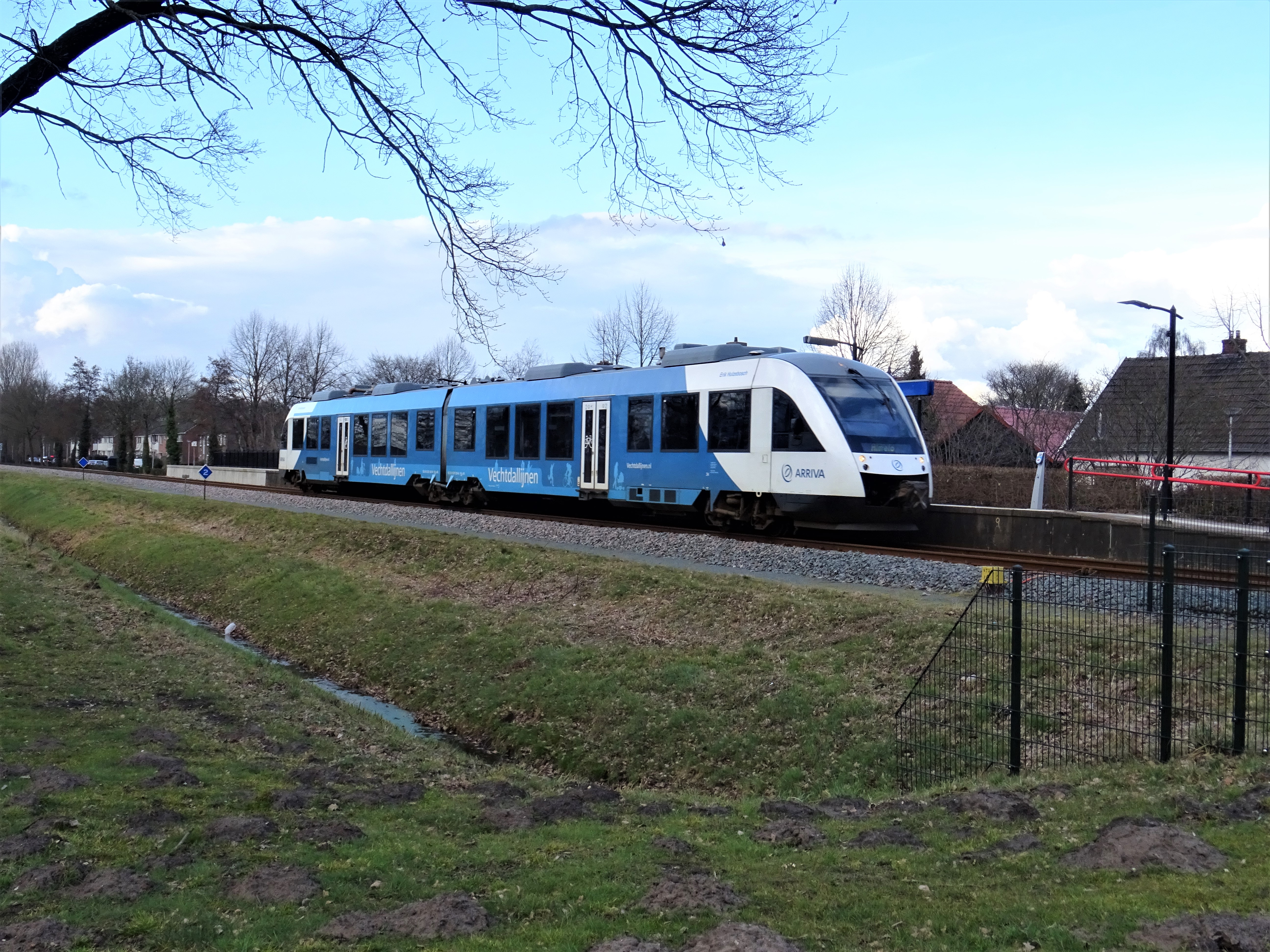
Railway station

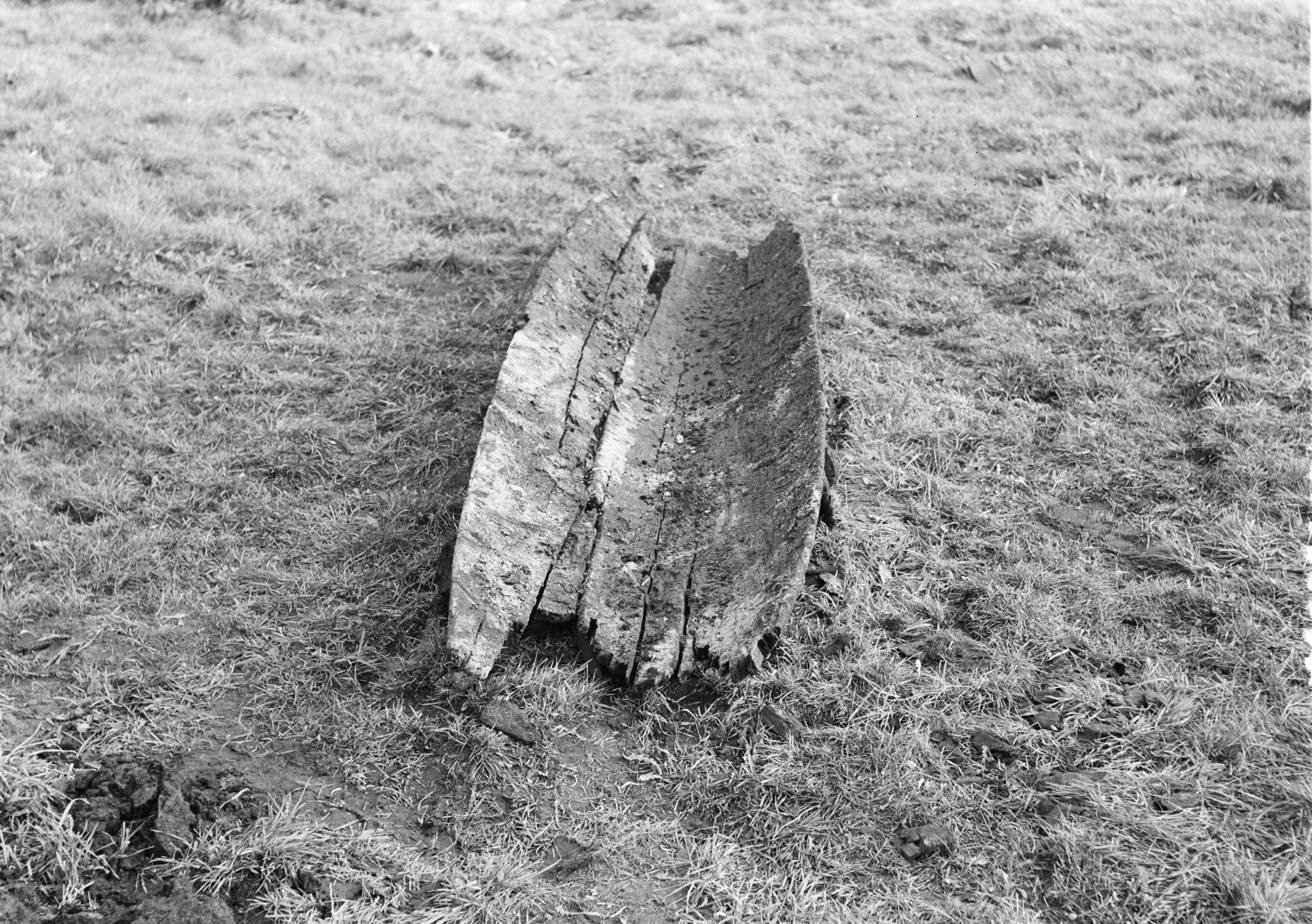
Canoe from around 200 BC
