= Coevorden railway station =

Railway station in Drenthe, Netherlands

Coevorden
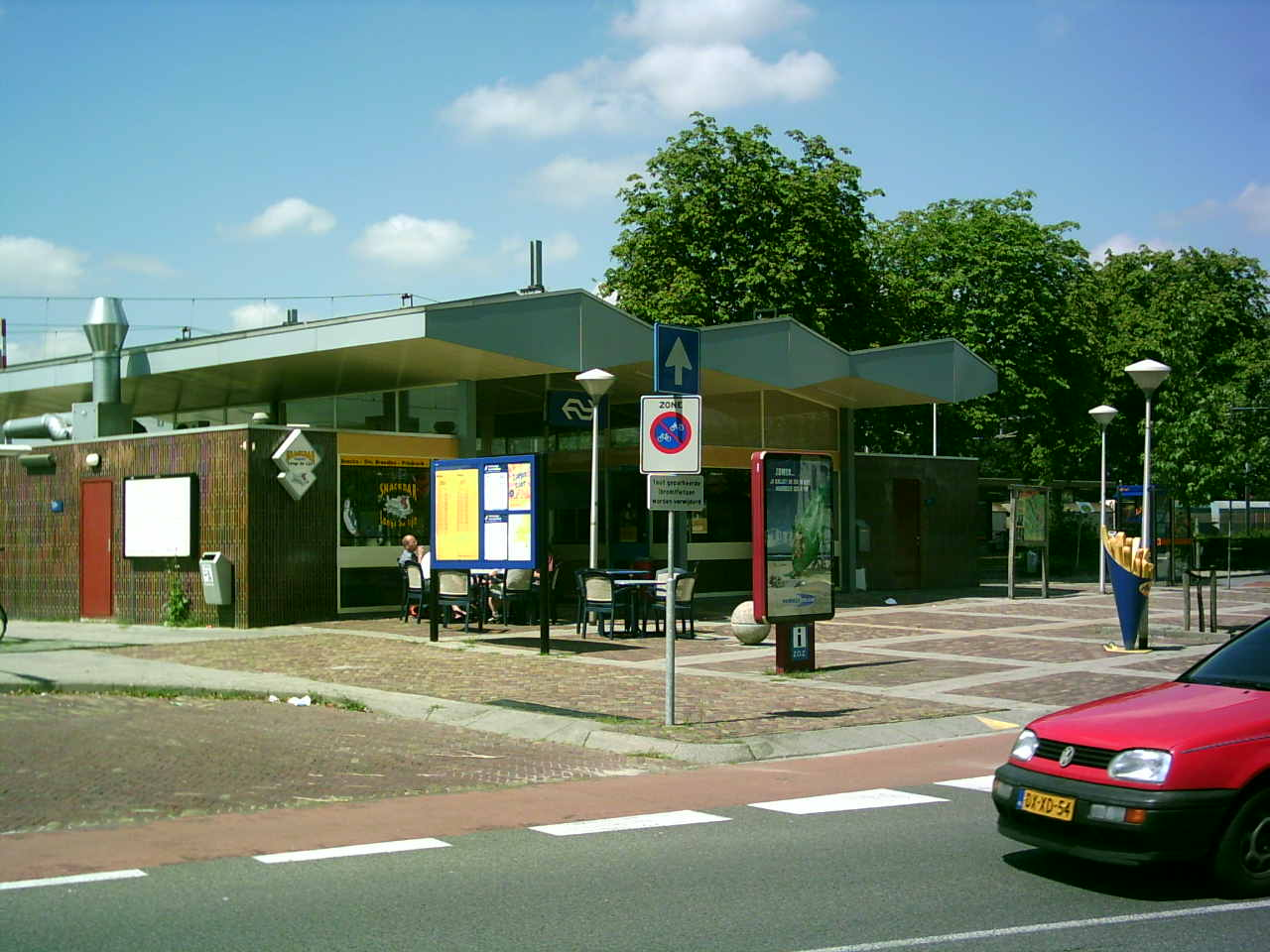

General information
- Location: Netherlands
- Coordinates: 52°39′47″N 6°44′08″E
- Line: Zwolle–Emmen railway

History
- Opened: 1 July 1905

Services
Preceding station	Arriva Netherlands	Following station
Hardenberg towards Zwolle	Sneltrein 3800	Nieuw Amsterdam towards Emmen
Hardenberg towards Zwolle	Sneltrein 13800 Peak hours only	Emmen Zuid towards Emmen
Gramsbergen towards Zwolle	Stoptrein 8000	Dalen towards Emmen
Location
- Location within Netherlands

Coevorden is a railway station located in Coevorden, Netherlands. The station was opened on 1 July 1905 and is located on the Zwolle–Emmen railway. The station is operated by Arriva. Coevorden is also the end of a railway from Bad Bentheim.

== Train services ==
Route	Service type	Operator	Notes
Zwolle - Ommen - Mariënberg - Hardenberg - Coevorden - Emmen	Local ("Stoptrein")	Arriva	1x per hour
Zwolle - Ommen - Mariënberg - Hardenberg - Coevorden - Emmen	Express ("Sneltrein")	Arriva	1x per hour
Zwolle - Hardenberg - Coevorden	Express ("Sneltrein")	Arriva	1x per hour - rush hours only. Skips Mariënberg, even though it is an express station.

== Bus services ==
Line	Route	Operator	Notes
25	Zweeloo - Aalden - Meppen - Oosterhesselen - Dalen - Plopsa Indoor - Coevorden	Taxi Dorenbos	1x per hour during morning rush hour and between 13:30 and 15:30, but only 1 run during afternoon rush hour. No service between 9:20 and 13:30, on evenings and weekends.
26	Emmen - Klazienaveen - Weiteveen - Schoonebeek - Coevorden	Qbuzz	No service on evenings. 1x per hour Mon-Sat, but only 2 runs on Sundays (around noon and around 18:00).
29	Zwolle - Ruitenveen - Nieuwleusen - Balkbrug - Dedemsvaart - Lutten - Slagharen (- De Krim - Coevorden)	Syntus Overijssel	The section between Slagharen and Coevorden is only served during rush hours.
33	Hoogeveen - Noordscheschut - Hollandscheveld - Elim - Nieuwlande - Dalerpeel - Steenwijksmoer - Coevorden	Drenthe Tours	No service on evenings and weekends.

== See also ==
- List of railway stations in Drenthe
