= Nieuw Amsterdam railway station =

Railway station in the Netherlands

Nieuw Amsterdam
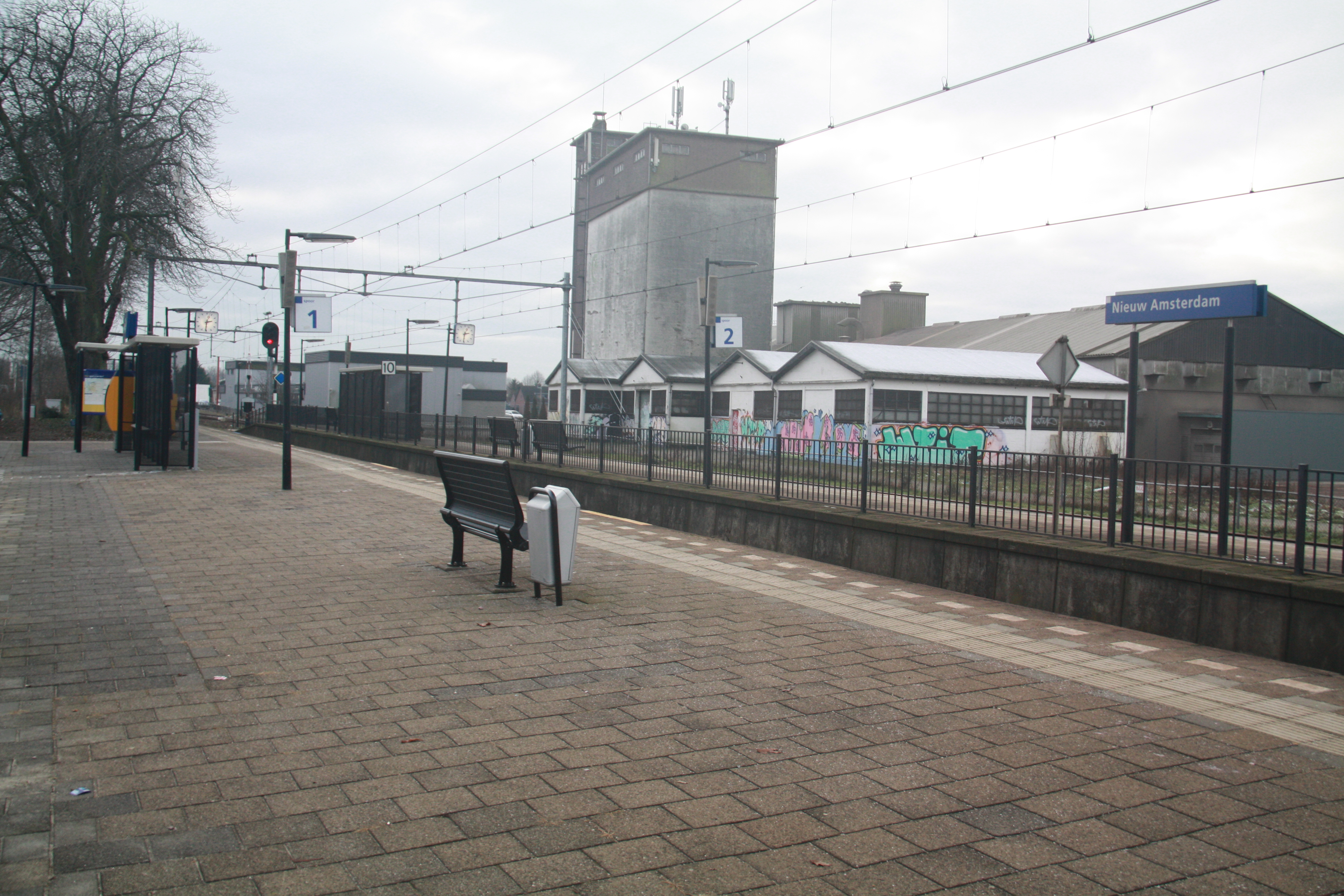

General information
- Location: Netherlands
- Coordinates: 52°43′07″N 6°50′55″E
- Line: Zwolle–Emmen railway

History
- Opened: 1 November 1905

Services
Preceding station	Arriva Netherlands	Following station
Coevorden towards Zwolle	Sneltrein 3800	Emmen Zuid towards Emmen
Dalen towards Zwolle	Stoptrein 8000	Emmen Zuid towards Emmen
Location
- Location within Netherlands

Nieuw Amsterdam is a railway station located in Nieuw Amsterdam, Netherlands. The station was opened on 1 November 1905 and is located on the Zwolle–Emmen railway. Train services are operated by Arriva under the name Blauwnet.

== Train services ==
Route	Service type	Operator	Notes
Zwolle - Ommen - Mariënberg - Hardenberg - Coevorden - Emmen	Local ("Stoptrein")	Arriva	1x per hour
Zwolle - Ommen - Mariënberg - Hardenberg - Coevorden - Emmen	Express ("Sneltrein")	Arriva	1x per hour

== Bus services ==
There is no regular bus service at this station, but the Hubtaxi (a small taxi bus that operates if called one hour in advance) does serve the station.

== See also ==
- List of railway stations in Drenthe
