= Mariënberg railway station =

Railway station in the Netherlands

Mariënberg (Mrb)
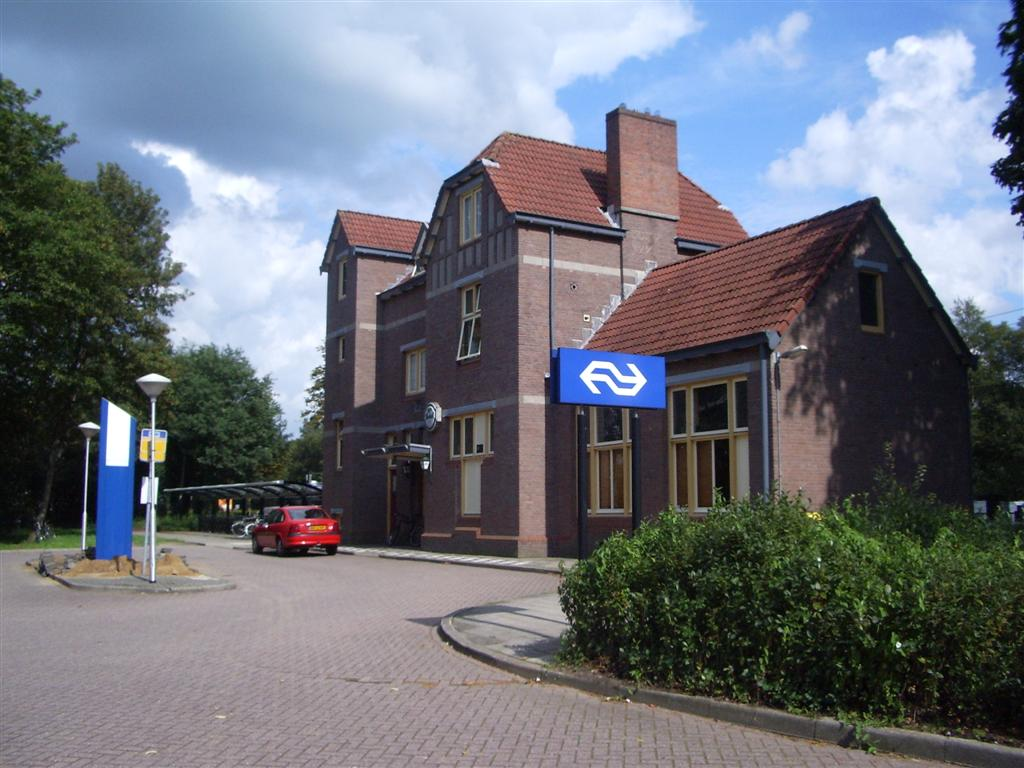

General information
- Location: Netherlands
- Coordinates: 52°30′32″N 6°34′28″E
- Lines: Zwolle–Emmen railway Mariënberg–Almelo railway

Services
Preceding station	Arriva Netherlands	Following station
Ommen towards Zwolle	Sneltrein 3800	Hardenberg towards Emmen
Ommen towards Zwolle	Stoptrein 8000	Hardenberg towards Emmen
Hardenberg Terminus	Stoptrein 31000	Vroomshoop towards Almelo
Location
- Location within Netherlands

Mariënberg is a railway station located in Mariënberg, Netherlands. The station was opened on 1 February 1905 and is located on the Zwolle–Emmen railway and the Mariënberg–Almelo railway. The services are operated by Arriva.

== Train services ==
Route	Service type	Operator	Notes
Almelo - Mariënberg - Hardenberg	Local ("Stoptrein")	Arriva	1x per hour - 2x per hour during rush hours and on Saturday afternoons
Zwolle - Ommen - Mariënberg - Hardenberg - Coevorden - Emmen	Local ("Stoptrein")	Arriva	1x per hour
Zwolle - Ommen - Mariënberg - Hardenberg - Coevorden - Emmen	Express ("Sneltrein")	Arriva	1x per hour

=== Platforms ===
1. Zwolle
2. Emmen
3. Almelo

== Bus services ==
Line	Route	Operator	Notes
597	Hardenberg - Bergentheim/Rheeze - Mariënberg - Beerze - Beerzerveld	Syntus Overijssel	No service on evenings and Sundays.

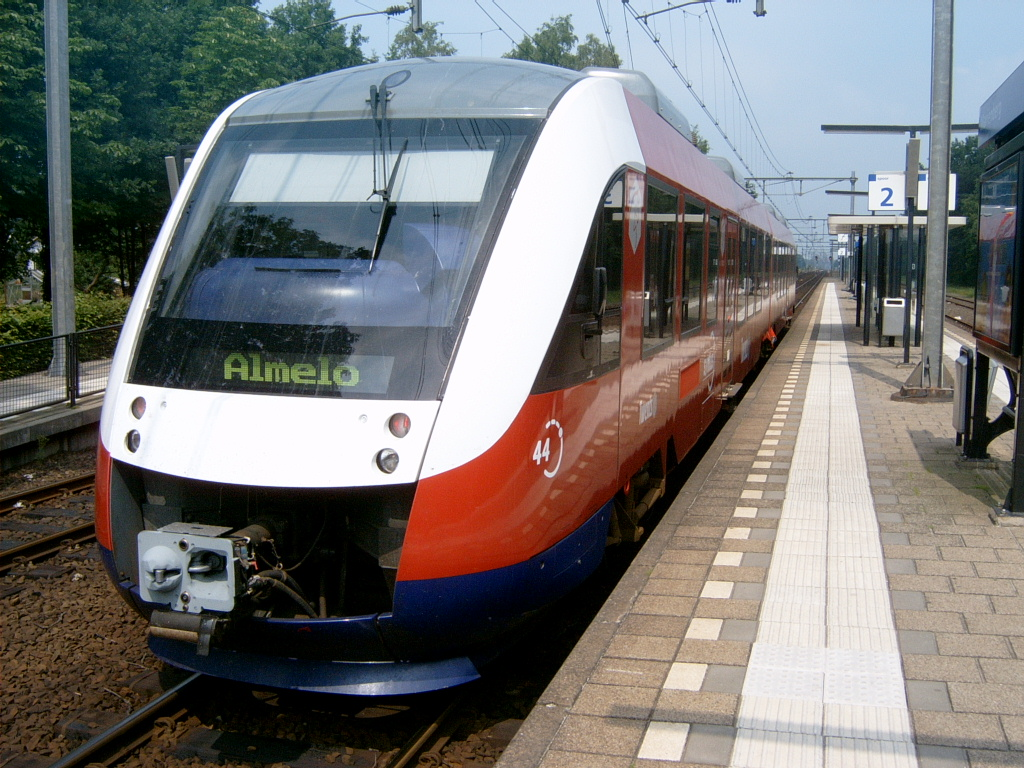
A LINT 41 train at Mariënberg station, bound for Almelo
