= Dalen railway station =

Railway station in Dalen, the Netherlands

Dalen
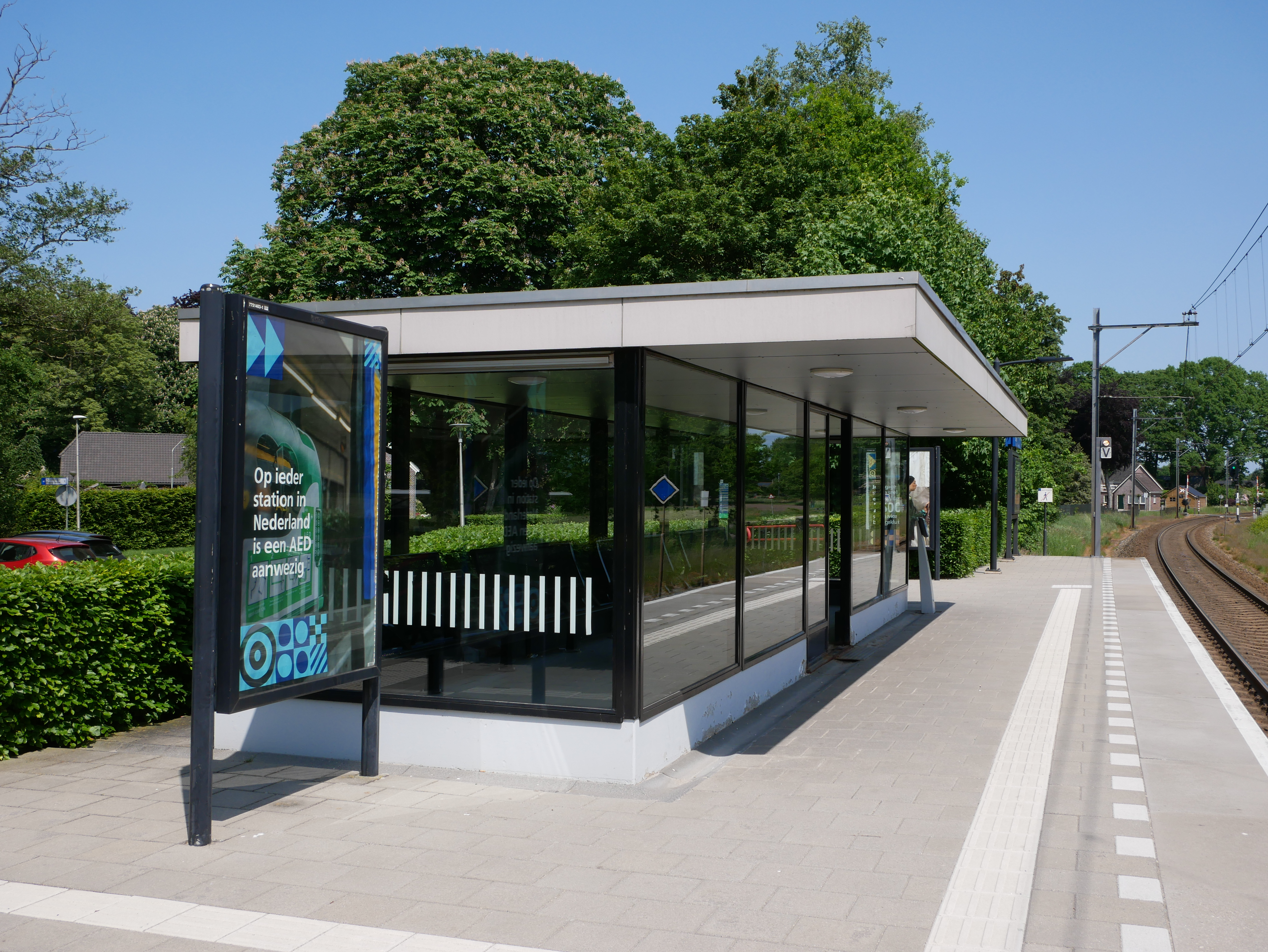

General information
- Location: Netherlands
- Coordinates: 52°41′40″N 6°45′29″E
- Line: Zwolle–Emmen railway

History
- Opened: 1 November 1905

Services
Preceding station	Arriva Netherlands	Following station
Coevorden towards Zwolle	Stoptrein 8000	Nieuw Amsterdam towards Emmen
Location
- Location within Netherlands

Dalen is a railway station located in Dalen, Netherlands. The station was opened on 1 November 1905 and is located on the Emmerlijn (Zwolle - Emmen). Train services are operated by Arriva. The station was closed between 2 October 1938 and 10 June 1940, 17 September 1944 and 27 June 1945 and 14 May 1950 and 31 May 1987.

== Train services ==
Route	Service type	Operator	Notes
Zwolle - Ommen - Mariënberg - Hardenberg - Coevorden - Emmen	Local ("Stoptrein")	Arriva	1x per hour

== Bus services ==
There is no bus service at this station. The nearest bus stop is in the village centre of Dalen.

== See also ==
- List of railway stations in Drenthe
