= Gramsbergen railway station =

Railway station in the Netherlands

Gramsbergen
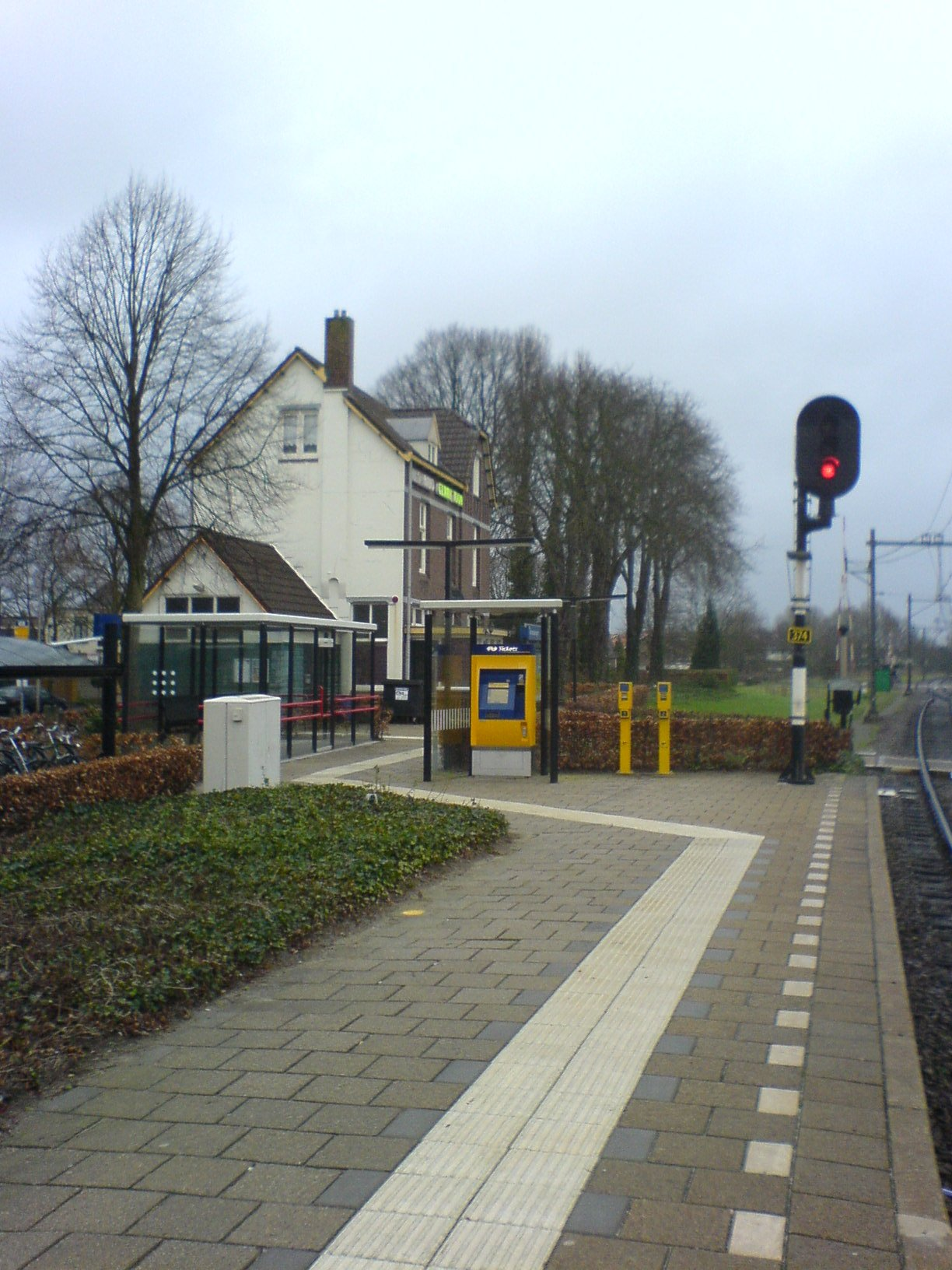

General information
- Location: Netherlands
- Coordinates: 52°36′34″N 6°40′33″E
- Line: Zwolle–Emmen railway

History
- Opened: 1 July 1905

Services
Preceding station	Arriva Netherlands	Following station
Hardenberg towards Zwolle	Stoptrein 8000	Coevorden towards Emmen
Location
- Location within Netherlands

Gramsbergen is a railway station located in Gramsbergen, Netherlands. The station was opened on 1 July 1905 and is located on the Zwolle–Emmen railway. The train services are operated by Arriva.

== Train services ==
Route	Service type	Operator	Notes
Zwolle - Ommen - Mariënberg - Hardenberg - Coevorden - Emmen	Local ("Stoptrein")	Arriva	1x per hour

== Bus services ==
Line	Route	Operator	Notes
599	Hardenberg - Loozen - Gramsbergen - Ane - De Krim	Syntus Overijssel	No service on evenings and weekends.
