= List of railway stations in Drenthe =

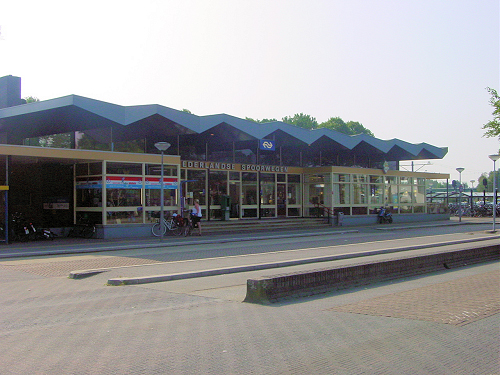
Emmen railway station

This is a list of railway stations in the Dutch province Drenthe:

== Current stations ==
- Assen railway station
- Beilen railway station
- Coevorden railway station
- Dalen railway station
- Emmen railway station
- Emmen Zuid railway station
- Hoogeveen railway station
- Meppel railway station
- Nieuw Amsterdam railway station

== Closed stations ==
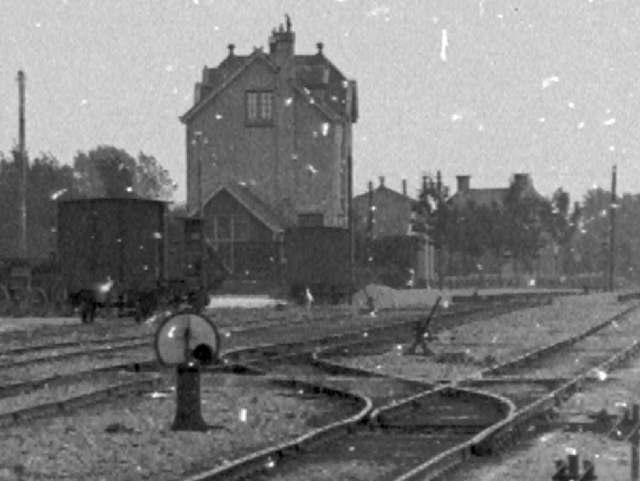
Gieten railway station circa 1915

- Anderen railway station
- Buinen railway station
- Dalerveen railway station
- Drouwen railway station
- Echten railway station
- Eext railway station
- Emmen Bargeres railway station
- Exloo railway station
- Gasselte railway station
- Gasselternijveen railway station
- Gieten railway station
- Hooghalen railway station
- Koekange railway station
- Musselkanaal Valthermond railway station
- Nijeveen railway station
- Oranjekanaal railway station
- Oudemolen railway station
- Ruinerwold railway station
- Rolde railway station
- Tweede Dwarsdiep railway station
- Vries-Zuidlaren railway station
- Valthe railway station
- Wijster railway station
- Weerdinge railway station
- Zandberg railway station
- Zuidbarge railway station

== See also ==
- Railway stations in the Netherlands
