= Dalen =

- Village
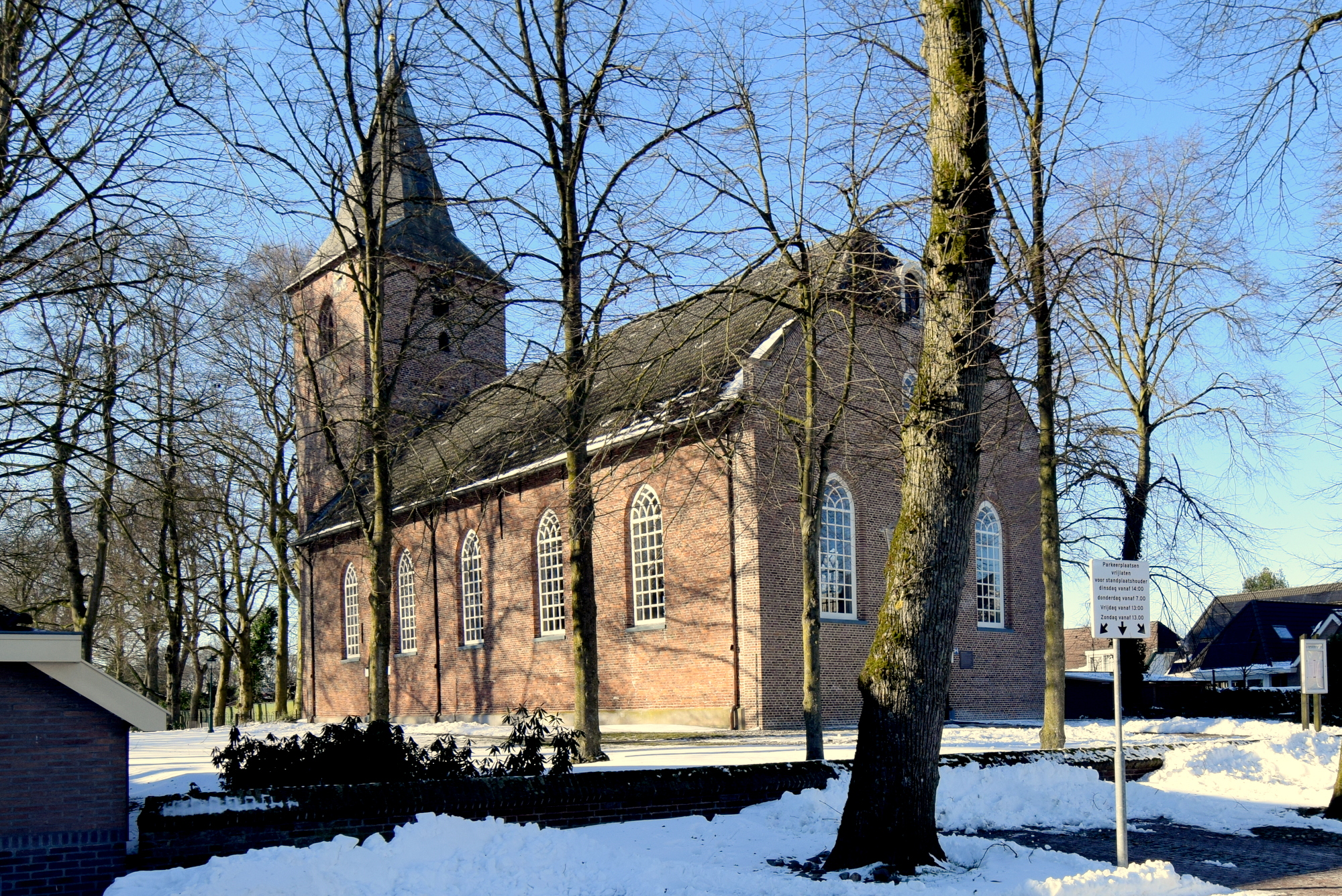
- Church of Dalen

- Flag Seal

- Location in Drenthe in the Netherlands Dalen (Netherlands)
- Coordinates: 52°42′N 6°45′E
- Country: Netherlands
- Province: Drenthe
- Municipality: Coevorden

Area
  - Total: 66.25 km^{2} (25.58 sq mi)
- Elevation: 13 m (43 ft)

Population (2021)
  - Total: 5,530
  - Density: 83.5/km^{2} (216/sq mi)
- Time zone: UTC+1 (CET)
  - Summer (DST): UTC+2 (CEST)
- Postal code: 7751
- Dialing code: 0524

Dalen (Dutch Low Saxon: Daoln) is a village and a former municipality in the northeastern Netherlands, in the province of Drenthe. Since 1998, Dalen has been part of the municipality of Coevorden.

The village was first mentioned in the 12th century as "in Dalon". The etymology is unclear. Dalen is an esdorp which developed in the Early Middle Ages along the road from Coevorden to Groningen. It contains two triangular village greens.

The Dutch Reformed church is an aisleless church with a tower from the 15th century. The church was damaged during the Siege of Coevorden of 1813 and rebuilt in 1824.

There are many shops and restaurants, bakeries and a pub called the D'aolle Bakkerij. The village is known for its two windmills, Jan Pol and De Bente, which are open to the public. There is a family resort from Center Parcs called 'De Huttenheugte' and next to the resort lies the theme park Plopsa Indoor. Dalen railway station has connections to Emmen and Coevorden/Zwolle.

== Notable people ==
Famous residents have included:

- Albert Bouwers (1893-1972), optician (born)
- Karsten Kroon (b. 1976), road bicycle racer (born)
- Gerald Sibon (b. 1974), football striker
