= De Bente, Dalen =

Windmill in Dalen, Netherlands

De Bente
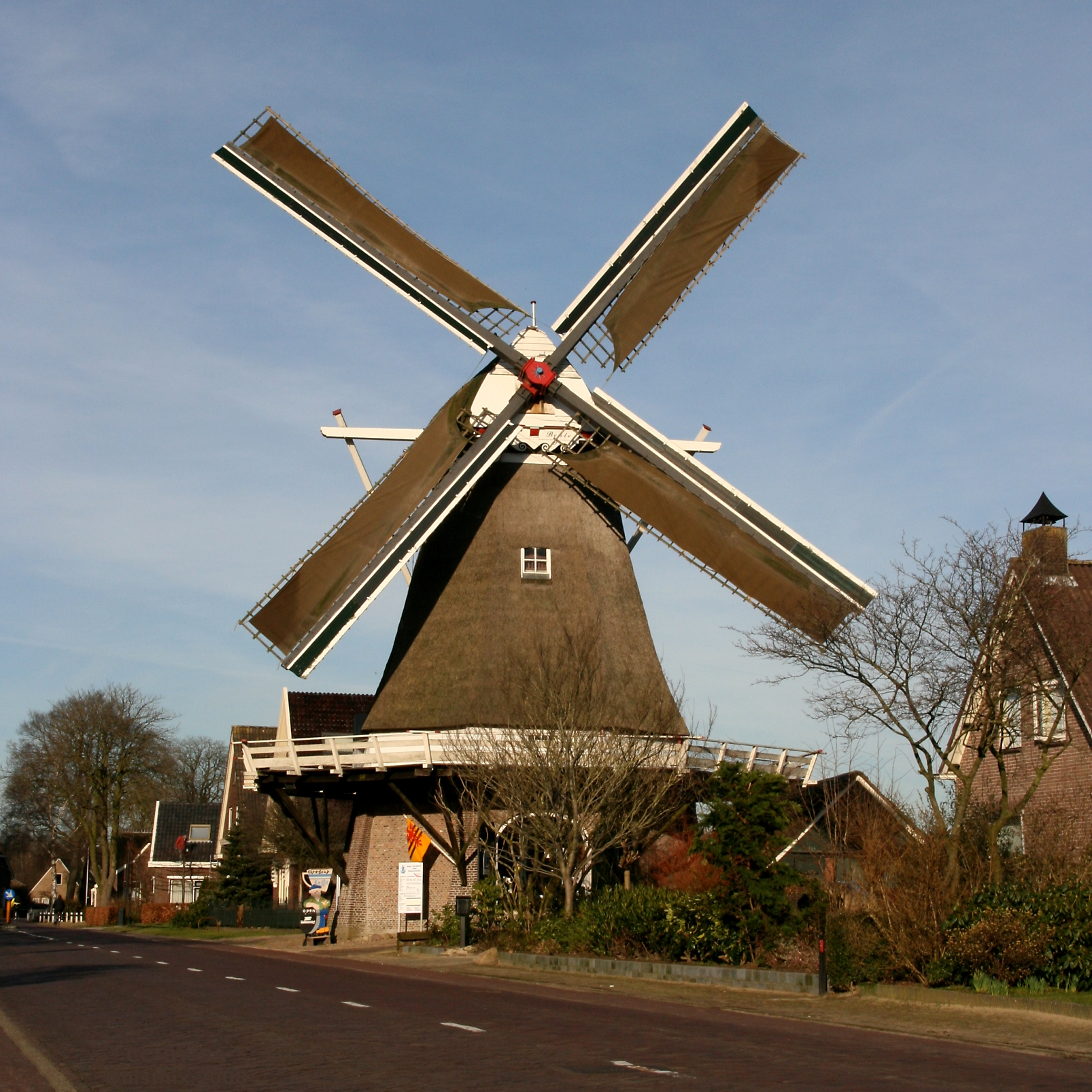
- De Bente, February 2008

Origin
- Mill name: De Bente
- Mill location: De Bente 40, 7751 GM Dalen
- Coordinates: 52°41′17″N 6°45′05″E
- Operator(s): Gemeente Coevorden
- Year built: 1814

Information
- Purpose: Corn mill
- Type: Smock mill
- Storeys: Three-storey smock
- Base storeys: Two-storey base
- Smock sides: Eight sides
- No. of sails: Four sails
- Type of sails: Common sails
- Windshaft: Cast iron
- Winding: Tailpole
- No. of pairs of millstones: Three pairs
- Size of millstones: Two pairs are 1.50 metres (4 ft 11 in) diameter each

De Bente is a smock mill in Dalen, Netherlands. It was built in 1814. The mill has been restored to full working order. It is listed as a Rijksmonument, number 44563

== History ==
De Bente was built in 1814. It replaced a mill that had been burnt down on 12 December 1813, through the actions of Cossacks attacking the French garrison in Coevorden. This was a post mill, the earliest type of European windmill. De Bente worked until 1944 when two sails were lost. The other pair of sails were lost in 1957. The mill was later demolished, leaving the base which was incorporated into a modern mill. It was restored in 1977 by millwright J D Medendorp of Zuidlaren. A new smock was built on the existing base. Machinery from a demolished windmill at Großheide, Lower Saxony, Germany was incorporated. In 1994, miller Hans Petit rented the mill, and had it restored to working order. In 2001, a third pair of millstones was installed. The mill produces about three tonnes of flour a week by windpower.

== Description ==
De Bente is what the Dutch describe as an "achtkante stellingmolen", an eight-sided smock mill with a stage. The stage is 4.10 metres (13 ft 5 in) above ground level. The mill has a three-storey smock on a two-storey base. The smock and cap are thatched. The Common sails have a span of 22.00 metres (72 ft 2 in). They are carried on a cast-iron windshaft dating from 1866, which originally came from a windmill at Koekange and has been shortened. It was cast by the millwrights Enthoven of The Hague. The wooden clasp arm Brake wheel has 60 cogs. It drives the wallower at the top of the upright shaft. The wallower has 33 cogs. At the bottom of the upright shaft, the great spur wheel with 115 cogs drives two lantern pinion stone nuts, each with 33 staves. There are two pairs of millstones which are 1.50 metres (4 ft 11 in) diameter. One pair are of Cullen stones, the other pair have a Cullen runner stone on a French Burr bedstone. A third pair of stones was added in 2001.

== Millers ==
- Hans Petit (since 1994)

Reference for above:-

== Public access ==
De Bente is open on Wednesdays and Thursdays from 13:00 to 17:00, on Saturdays from 10:00 to 17:00 and at other times by appointment.
