= Emmen Zuid railway station =

Railway station in the Netherlands

Emmen Zuid
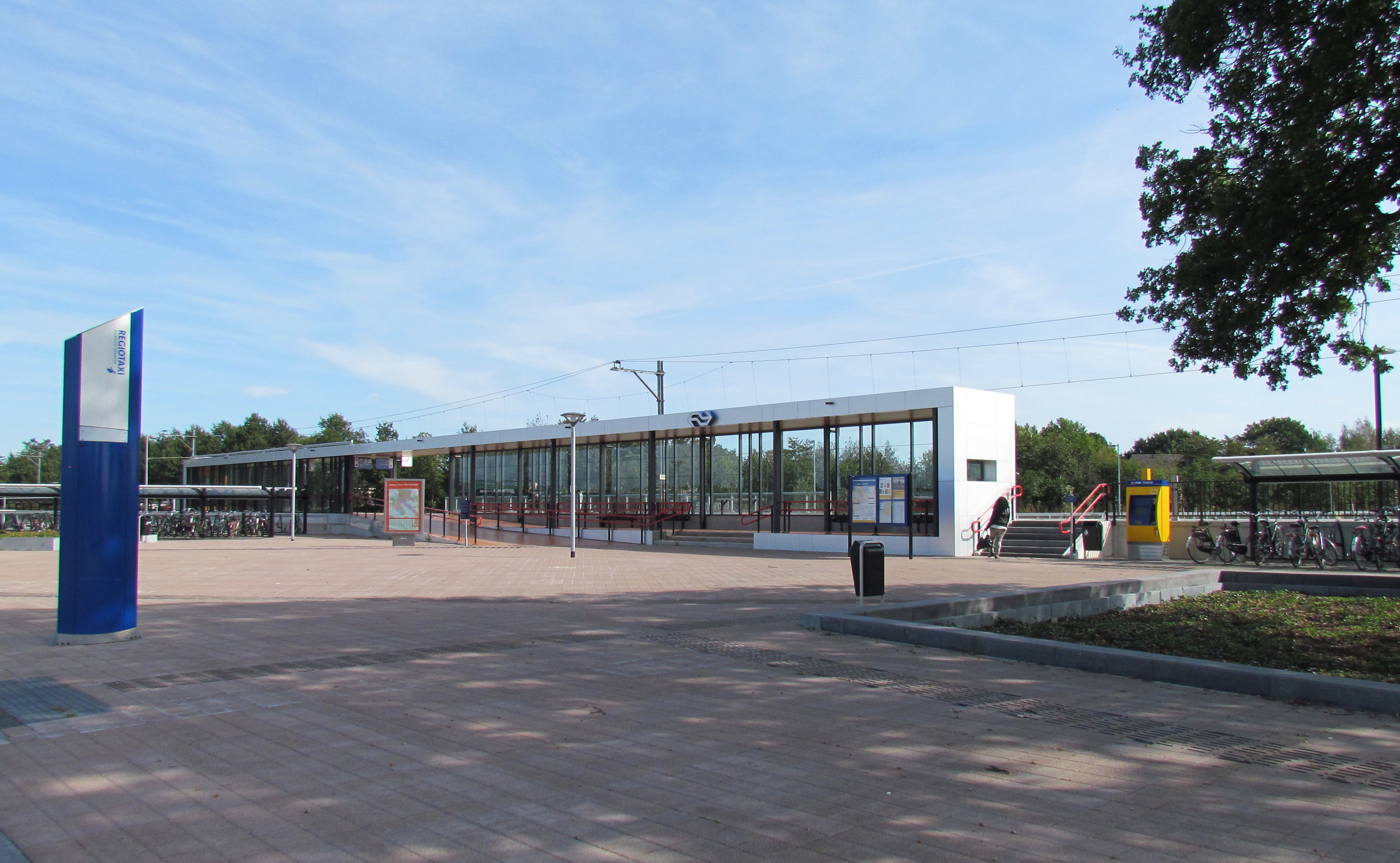

General information
- Location: Netherlands
- Coordinates: 52°44′56″N 6°52′29″E
- Line: Zwolle–Emmen railway

History
- Opened: 3 April 2011

Services
Preceding station	Arriva Netherlands	Following station
Nieuw Amsterdam towards Zwolle	Sneltrein 3800	Emmen Terminus
Coevorden towards Zwolle	Sneltrein 13800 Peak hours only	Emmen Terminus
Nieuw Amsterdam towards Zwolle	Stoptrein 8000	Emmen Terminus
Location
- Location within Netherlands

Emmen Zuid is a railway station located in Emmen, Netherlands, on the Zwolle–Emmen railway. The services are operated by Arriva. There is a tunnel under the railway line for the road and cycle path. Near the station is a car park and bus station. The station opened on 3 April 2011 and replaced Emmen Bargeres railway station. Construction work for the station began in March 2010. Formerly, there was a level crossing at the station location.

== Train services ==
Route	Service type	Operator	Notes
Zwolle - Ommen - Mariënberg - Hardenberg - Coevorden - Emmen	Local ("Stoptrein")	Arriva	1x per hour
Zwolle - Ommen - Mariënberg - Hardenberg - Coevorden - Emmen	Express ("Sneltrein")	Arriva	1x per hour

== Bus services ==
Since 2018, there is no regular bus service anymore at this station, but the Hubtaxi (a small taxi bus that operates if called one hour in advance) does serve the station.

== See also ==
- List of railway stations in Drenthe
