= Emmen Bargeres railway station =

Railway station in Emmen, the Netherlands

Emmen Bargeres
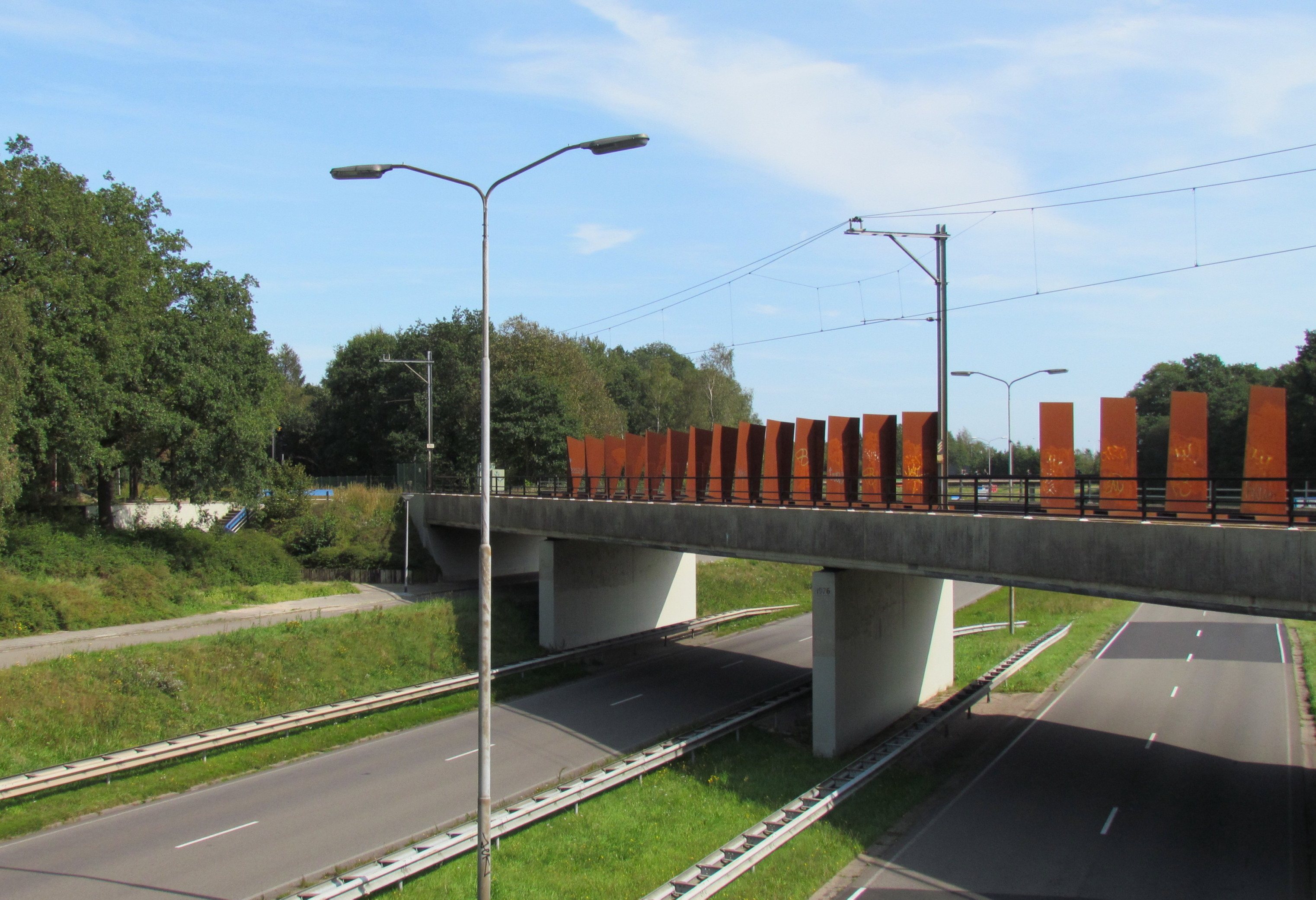

General information
- Location: Netherlands
- Coordinates: 52°45′29″N 6°53′24″E
- Line: Zwolle–Emmen railway

History
- Closed: 3 April 2011
Location
- Location within Netherlands

Emmen Bargeres is a former railway station located in Emmen, Netherlands. It was open from 1 June 1975 until 3 April 2011 and was located on the Emmerlijn (Zwolle - Emmen). The station was operated by Nederlandse Spoorwegen. The station was replaced by Emmen Zuid railway station, at another location on the same line.

The station was elevated over a single track bridge over the N391 road.

== See also ==
- List of railway stations in Drenthe
