= Jan Pol (windmill) =

Dutch windmill

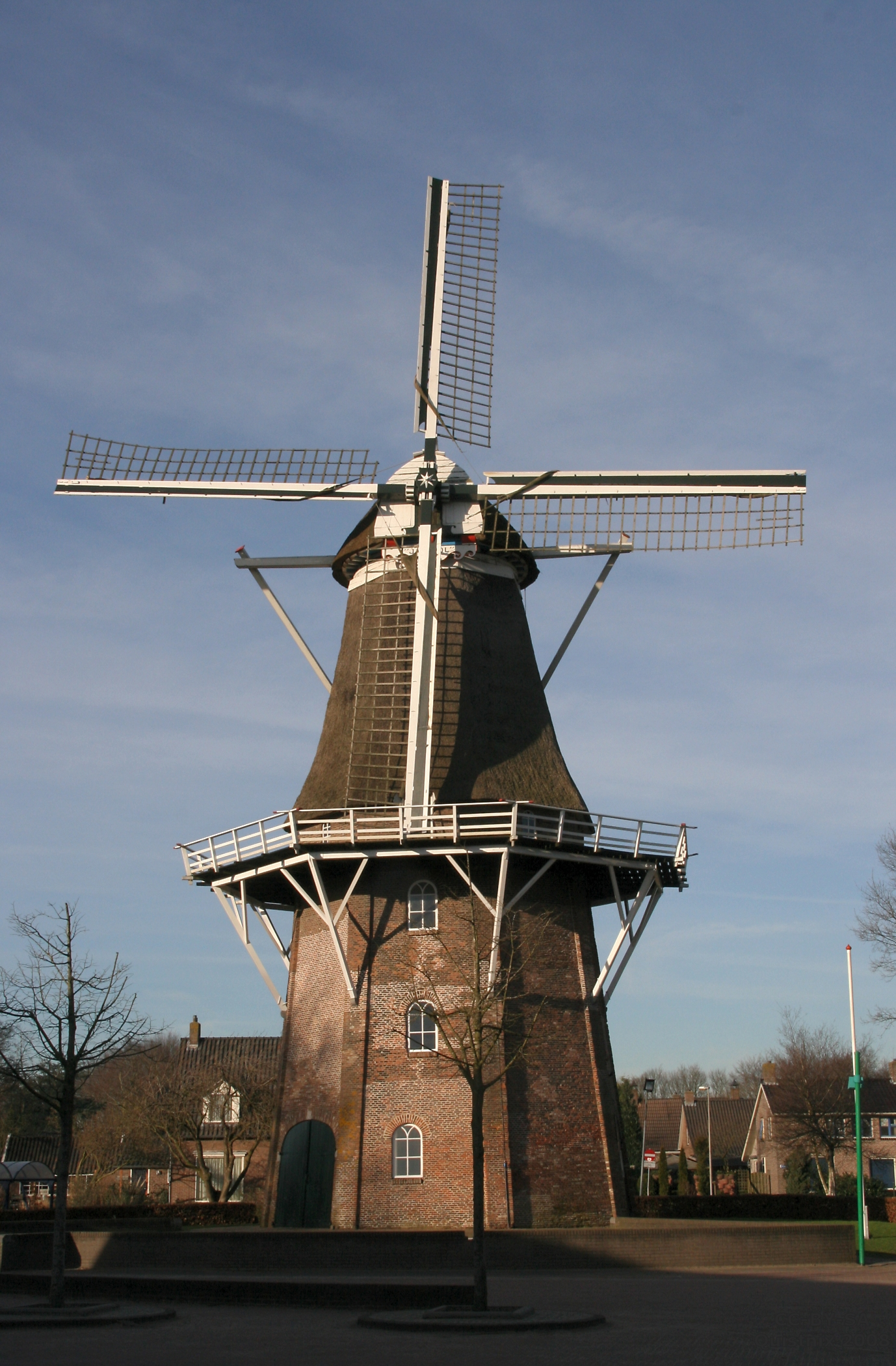
- Jan Pol, February 2009

Origin
- Mill name: Jan Pol; Molen van Pol
- Mill location: Molenwijk 8, 7751 CG, Dalen
- Coordinates: 52°42′03″N 6°45′16″E
- Operator(s): Gemeente Coevorden
- Year built: 1876

Information
- Purpose: Corn mill and barley polishing mill
- Type: Smock mill
- Storeys: Three-storey smock
- Base storeys: Three-storey base
- Smock sides: Eight sides
- No. of sails: Four sails
- Type of sails: Common sails
- Windshaft: Cast iron
- Winding: Tailpole and winch
- No. of pairs of millstones: Three pairs
- Size of millstones: 1.50 metres (4 ft 11 in), 1.40 metres (4 ft 7 in) and 1.40 metres (4 ft 7 in)
- Other information: Tallest remaining windmill in Drenthe

Jan Pol is a smock mill in Dalen, Netherlands. It was built in 1876. The mill is a Rijksmonument, number 44562.

== History ==
Jan Pol was built in 1876, replacing a mill that had been built in 1820 and burnt down following a lightning strike in 1875. It was built by millwright Schiller from Dalfsen, Overijssel. In operation until 1947, it was stripped of machinery in 1958. Restoration by millwright Huberts of Coevorden began in 1971 and was completed in 1972. Further restoration was undertaken in 1993 by millwrights Doornbosch of Adorp, Groningen. The mill is named for Jan Pol, who owned it from 1942 until his death in 1982. It is the tallest windmill standing today in Drenthe.

== Description ==
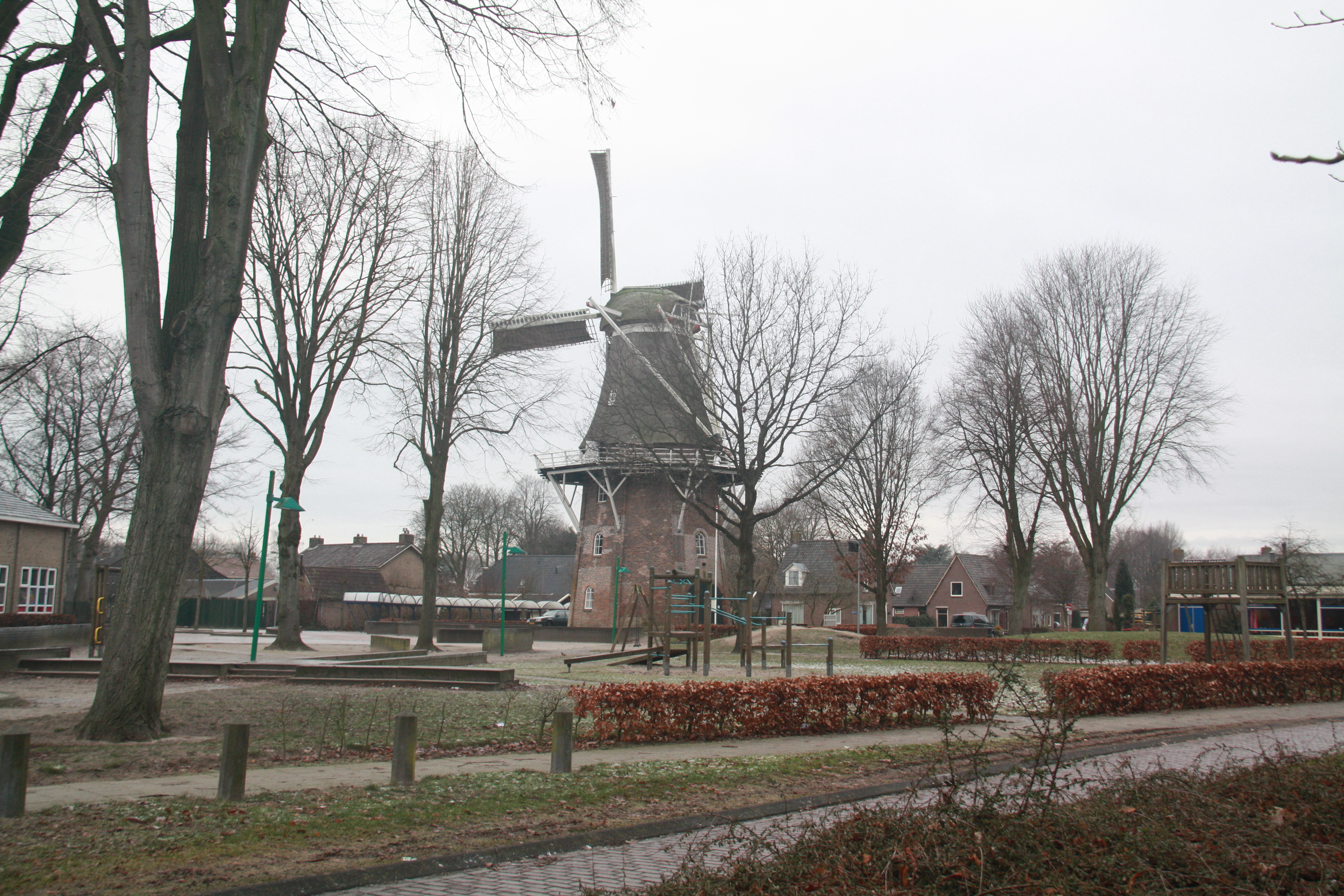

Jan Pol is what the Dutch describe as an "achtkante stellingmolen", a smock mill with a stage. The mill has a three-storey brick base with a three-storey smock. The height of the stage is 9.90 metres (32 ft 6 in) above ground level. The smock and cap are thatched. The four Common sails span 21.60 metres (70 ft 10 in). They are carried on a cast-iron windshaft which was made by the millwrights Prins van Oranje, of The Hague in 1866. The windshaft carries the brake wheel, which has 61 cogs. It drives the wallower at the top of the upright shaft. The wallower has 34 cogs. At the bottom of the upright shaft, the great spur wheel with 115 cogs drives two lantern pinion stone nuts, one with 37 staves and one with 38 staves. The pearl barley stones are driven by a stone nut with 28 cogs.

== Public access ==
Jan Pol is open on Tuesdays, Wednesdays, Thursdays and Saturdays from 1 April to 1 November between 13:30 and 16:30. It is also open throughout the year by appointment.
