= Daarle =

Daarle Doarle
- Village
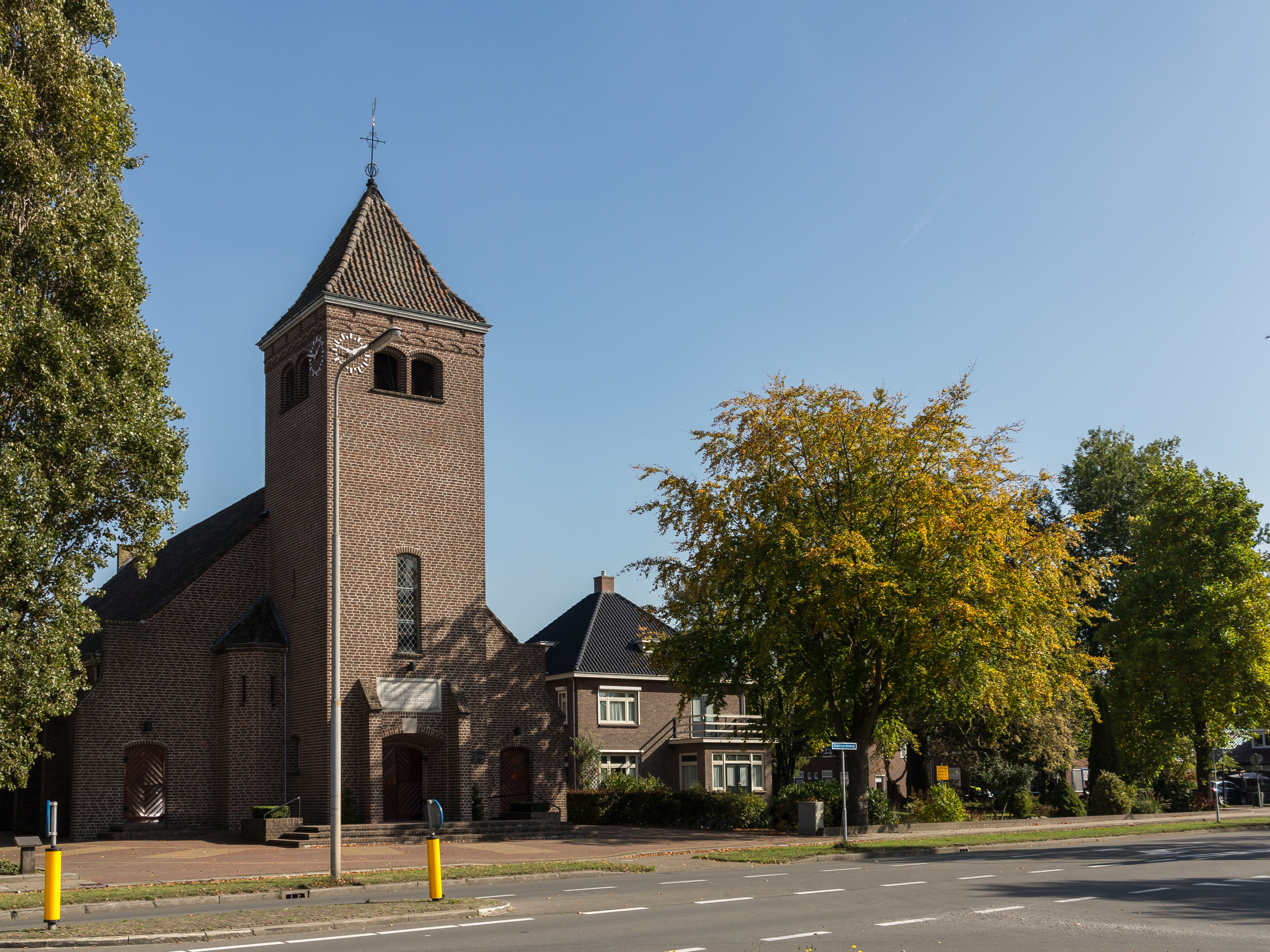
- Dutch Reformed Church of Daarle

- Location in the province of Overijssel in the Netherlands Daarle (Netherlands)
- Coordinates: 52.4328°N 6.5353°E
- Country: Netherlands
- Province: Overijssel
- Municipality: Hellendoorn

Area
  - Total: 16.25 km^{2} (6.27 sq mi)
- Elevation: 8 m (26 ft)

Population (2021)
  - Total: 835
  - Density: 51.4/km^{2} (133/sq mi)
- Time zone: UTC+1 (CET)
  - Summer (DST): UTC+2 (CEST)
- Postal code: 7688
- Dialing code: 0546

Daarle (Dutch Low Saxon: Doarle) is a village in the Dutch province of Overijssel in the Twente region. It is part of the municipality of Hellendoorn.

== History ==
The village was first mentioned the late-10th century as "in Darloe", and probably means "hidden open forest". Daarle is an esdorp which was established in the Early Middle Ages along the Daarlerbeek which is a tributary of the Regge River. The village used to be surrounded by endless moorland. It started to develop after the Overijssels Kanaal was dug in 1850, and the peat in the region was excavated.

Daarle was home to 386 people in 1840. The first Dutch Reformed church was constructed in 1855. It had become too small by the 1930s, and a new church was built in 1955 on the village square which has an unarticulated tower. The Reformed Church was built first in 1933.

The water tower was built in 1934 and served the whole region. By 1995, it became obsolete as a new extraction area between Den Ham and Vroomshoop was put into use. Additionally, the technical facilities for pumping through had progressed to such an extent that water towers were no longer needed to maintain a constant pressure on the water supply. In 2004, it was sold to a new owner which intends to make it a residential building whilst still preserving the image-defining function in the landscape.

== Gallery ==
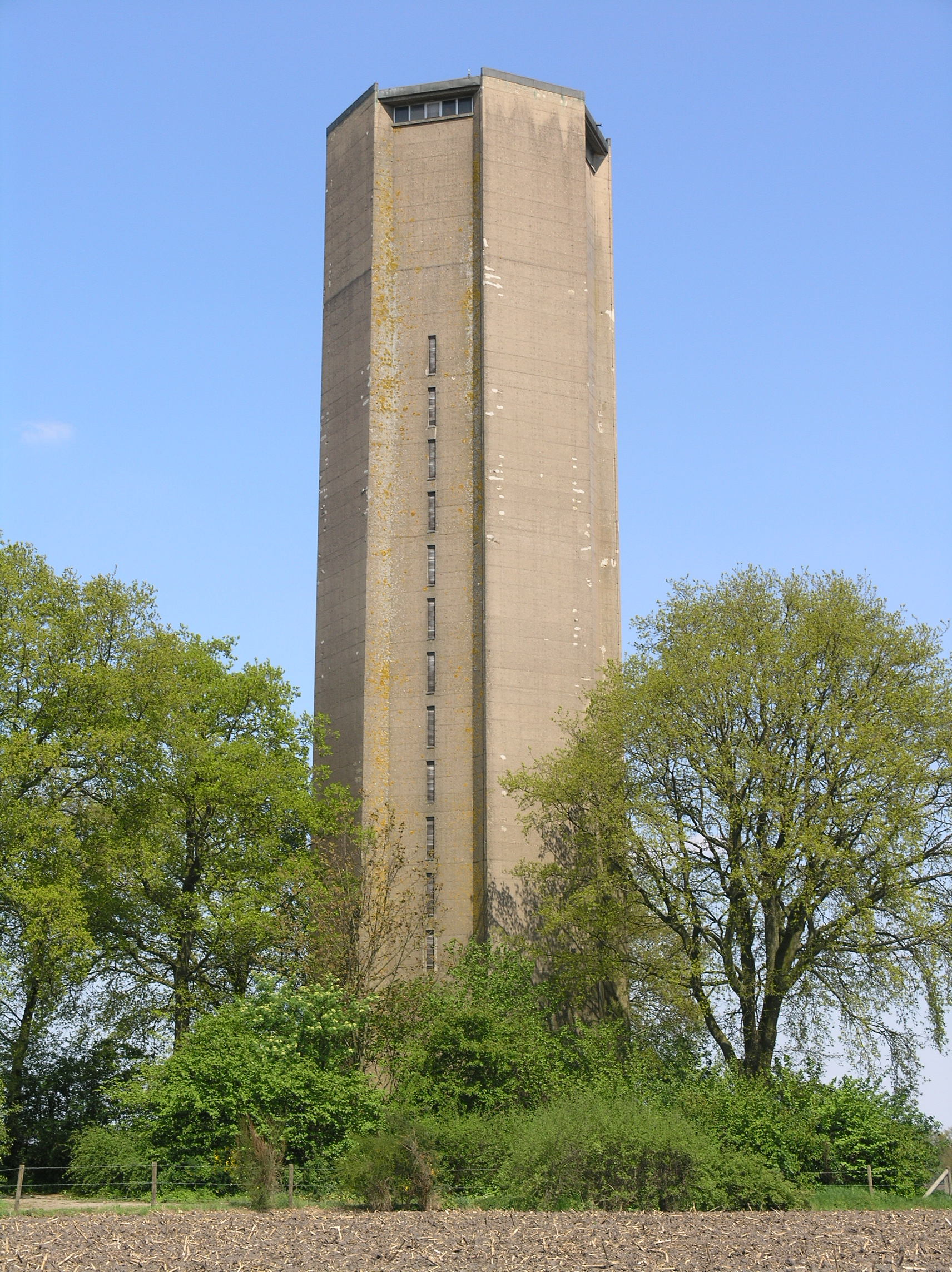
Water tower

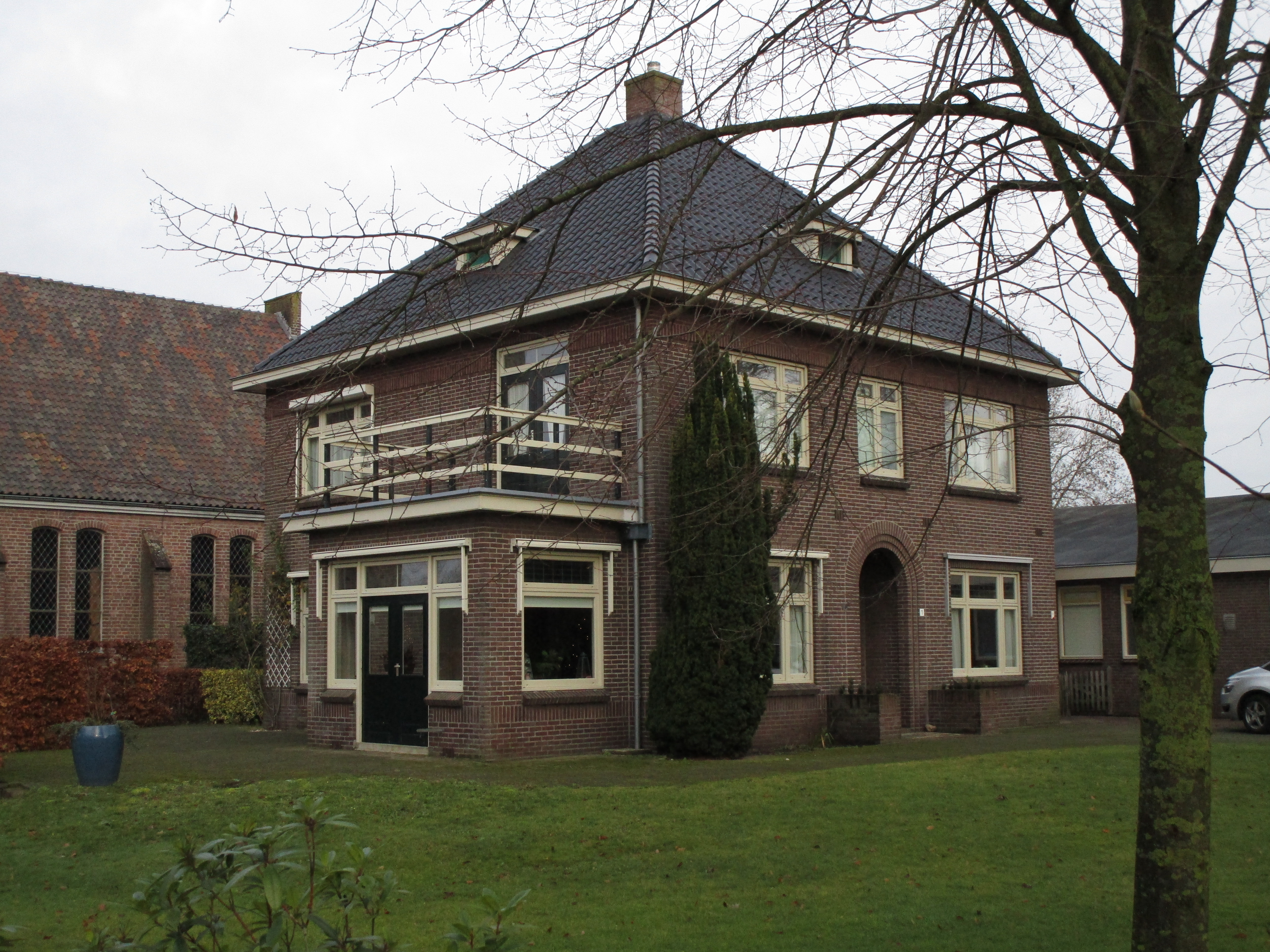
Clergy house

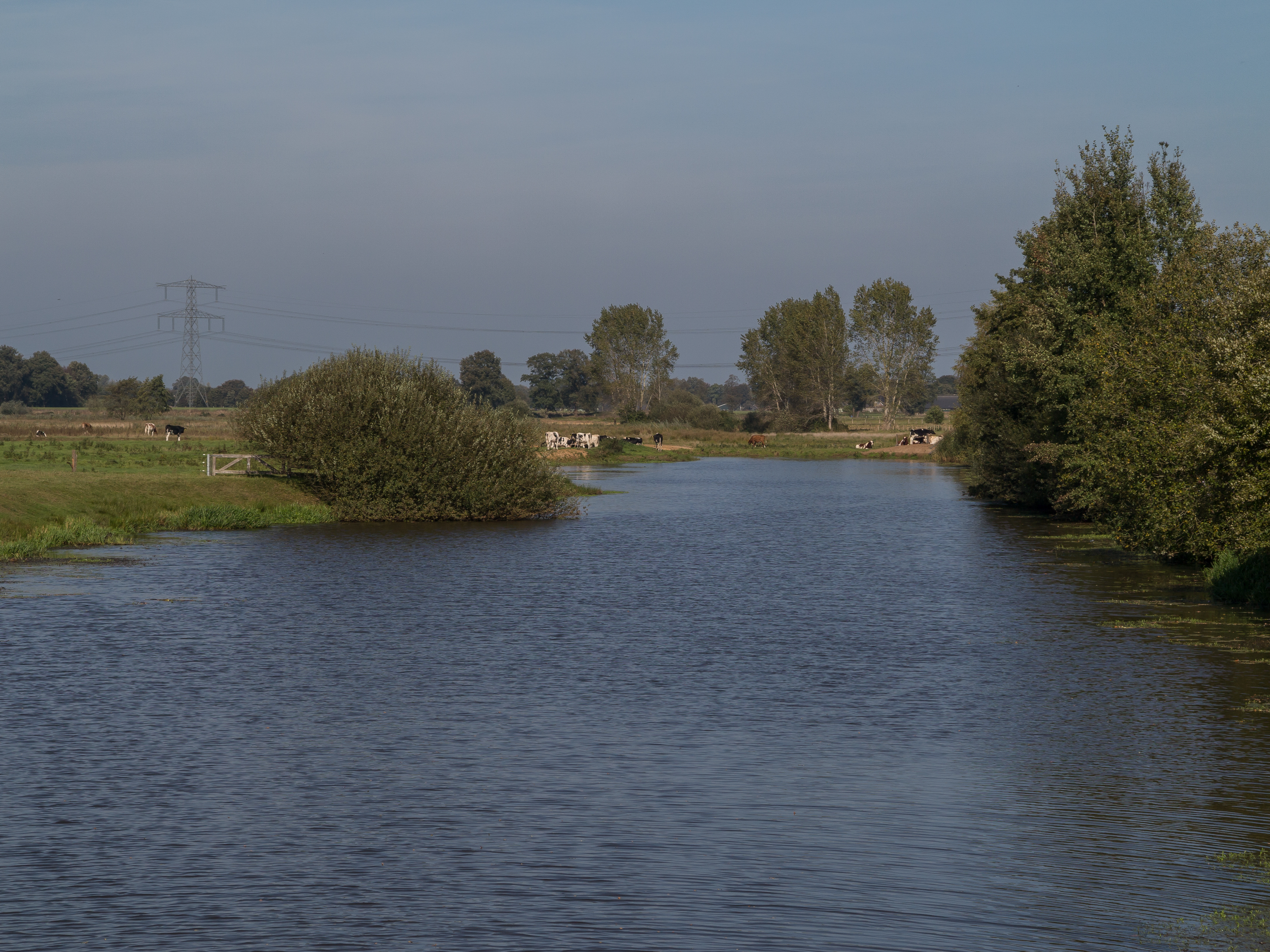
The Regge near Daarle
