= Hardenberg railway station =

Railway station in Hardenberg, Netherlands

Hardenberg
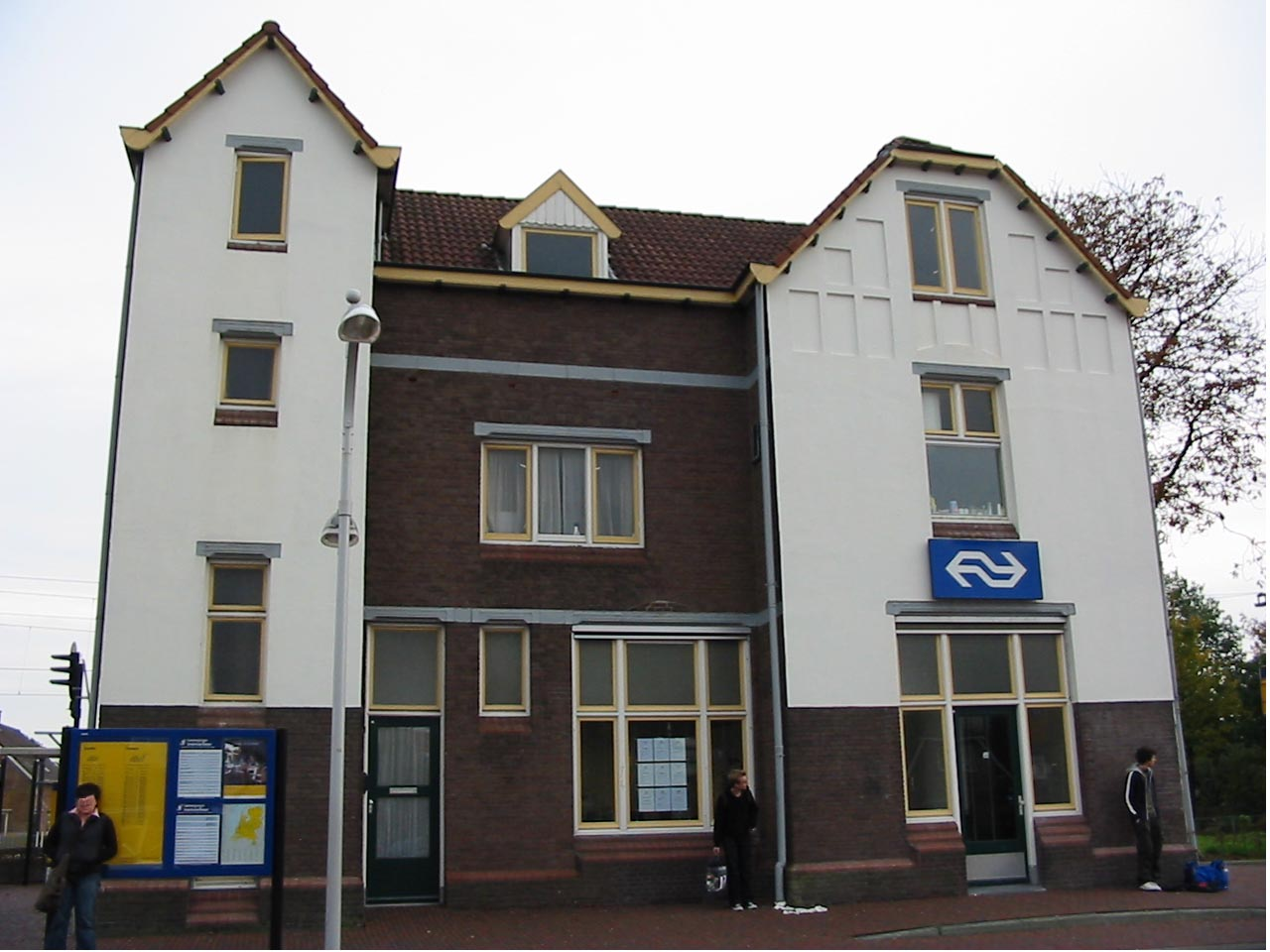

General information
- Location: Netherlands
- Coordinates: 52°34′20″N 6°37′40″E
- Line: Zwolle–Emmen railway

Services
Preceding station	Arriva Netherlands	Following station
Mariënberg towards Zwolle	Sneltrein 3800	Coevorden towards Emmen
Mariënberg towards Zwolle	Stoptrein 8000	Gramsbergen towards Emmen
Ommen towards Zwolle	Sneltrein 13800 Peak hours only	Coevorden towards Emmen
Terminus	Stoptrein 31000	Mariënberg towards Almelo
Location
- Location within Netherlands

Hardenberg is a railway station located in Hardenberg, Netherlands. The station was opened on 1 February 1905 and is located on the Zwolle- Emmen railway. The services are operated by Arriva.

== Train services ==
Route	Service type	Operator	Notes
Almelo - Mariënberg - Hardenberg	Local ("Stoptrein")	Arriva	1x per hour - 2x per hour during rush hours and on Saturday afternoons
Zwolle - Ommen - Mariënberg - Hardenberg - Coevorden - Emmen	Local ("Stoptrein")	Arriva	1x per hour
Zwolle - Ommen - Mariënberg - Hardenberg - Coevorden - Emmen	Express ("Sneltrein")	Arriva	1x per hour
Zwolle - Ommen - Hardenberg - Coevorden	Express ("Sneltrein")	Arriva	2x per hour - rush hours only. Skips Mariënberg, even though it is an express station.

== Bus services ==
Line	Route	Operator	Notes
30	Hardenberg - Heemserveen - Lutten - Slagharen - Kerkenveld - Zuideropgaande - Hollandscheveld - Hoogeveen	Syntus Overijssel	No service on weekends after 19:00
80	Almelo - Vriezenveen - Westerhaar - Sibculo - Kloosterhaar - Bergentheim - Hardenberg	Twents	No service after 22:00. On evenings and weekends, this bus only operates between Almelo and Westerhaar.
597	Hardenberg - Bergentheim/Rheeze - Mariënberg - Beerze - Beerzerveld	Syntus Overijssel	No service on evenings and Sundays.
598	Hardenberg - Ebbenbroek - Kloosterhaar - Bruchterveld	Syntus Overijssel	No service on evenings (except shopping nights ("koopavonden")) and Sundays.
599	Hardenberg - Loozen - Gramsbergen - Ane - De Krim	Syntus Overijssel	Mon-Fri during daytime hours only.
629	Dedemsvaart → Lutten → Heemserveen → Hardenberg	Syntus Overijssel	1 run during morning rush hour only.
680	Den Ham - Vroomshoop - Sibculo - Kloosterhaar - Bergentheim - Hardenberg	Twents and Schepers	2 runs during morning rush hour, 1 run during afternoon rush hour. The morning runs are operated by Schepers, the afternoon run by Twents.
