= Mariënberg =

Mariënberg Mainbarg
- Village
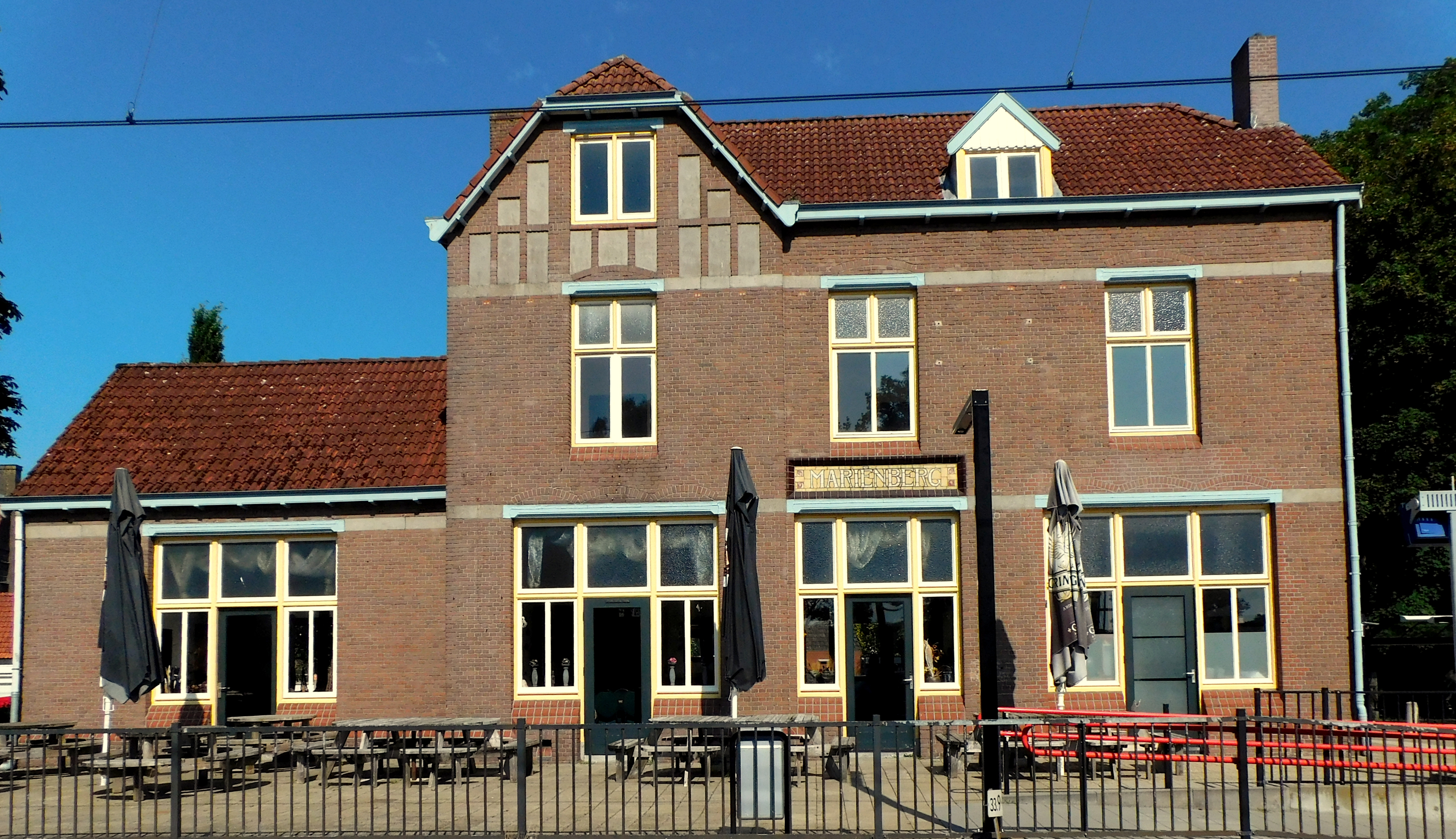
- Mariënberg railway station

- Location in province of Overijssel in the Netherlands Mariënberg (Netherlands)
- Coordinates: 52°30′32″N 6°34′24″E
- Country: Netherlands
- Province: Overijssel
- Municipality: Hardenberg

Area
  - Total: 2.49 km^{2} (0.96 sq mi)
- Elevation: 9 m (30 ft)

Population (2021)
  - Total: 940
  - Density: 380/km^{2} (980/sq mi)
- Time zone: UTC+1 (CET)
  - Summer (DST): UTC+2 (CEST)
- Postal code: 7692
- Dialing code: 0523

Mariënberg (Dutch Low Saxon: Mainbarg or Mainbarrug) is a village in the Dutch province of Overijssel. It is located in the municipality of Hardenberg, and lies on the westside of the Vecht river, between Hardenberg and Ommen.

== History ==
A village developed around the nunnery founded 1233 which moved to Zwartsluis in 1244. In 1405, a new nunnery was founded and named Beata Maria Virgo in Galilea, and the village became known as Mariënberg meaning "hill of Mary. In 1903, a train station was built in Mariënberg.

== Transport ==
- Mariënberg railway station

== Notable residents ==
- Christian Kist (born 1986), darts player
- Roel Kuiper (born 1962), politician, historian and philosopher

== Gallery ==
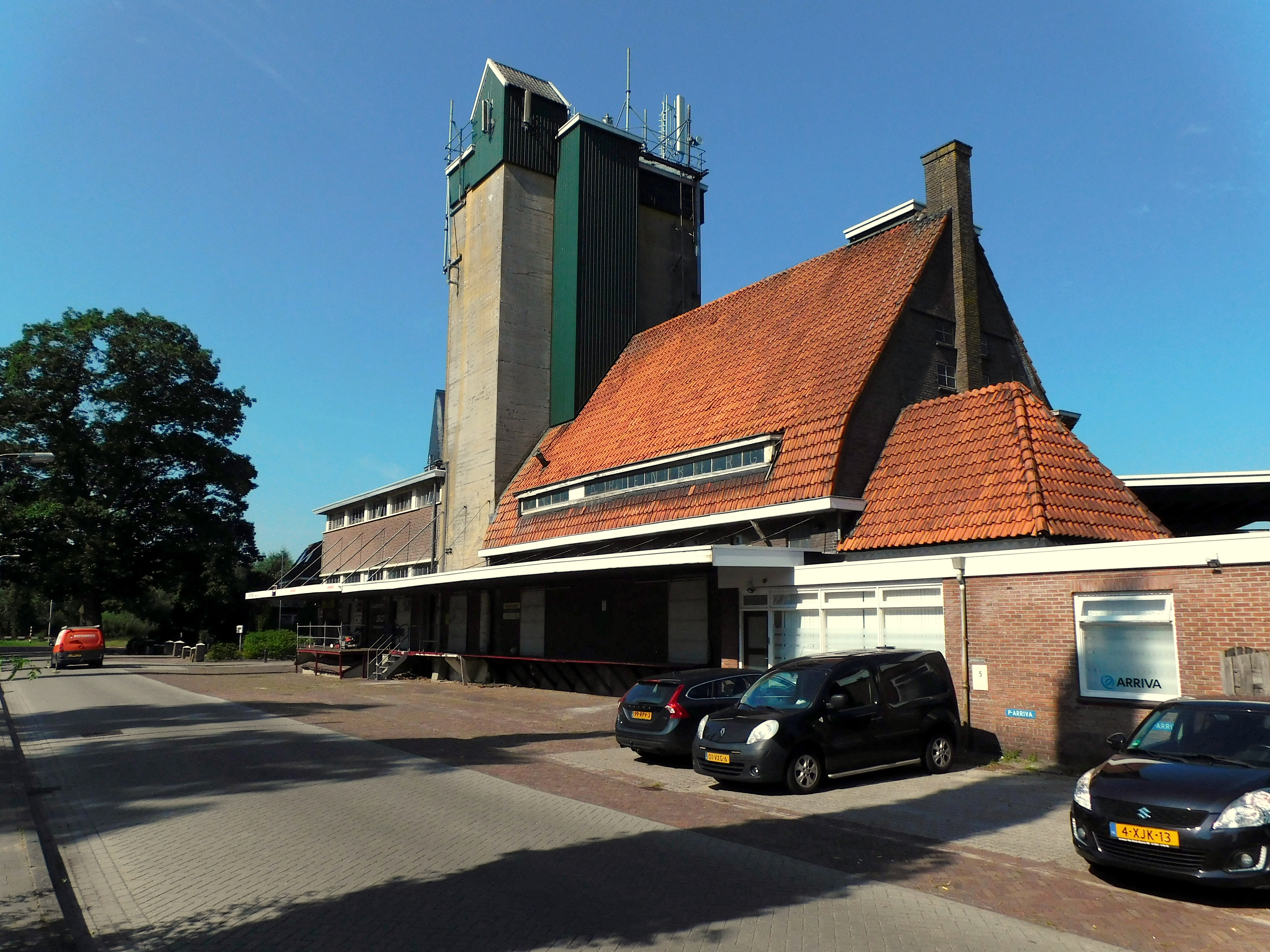
Grain silo

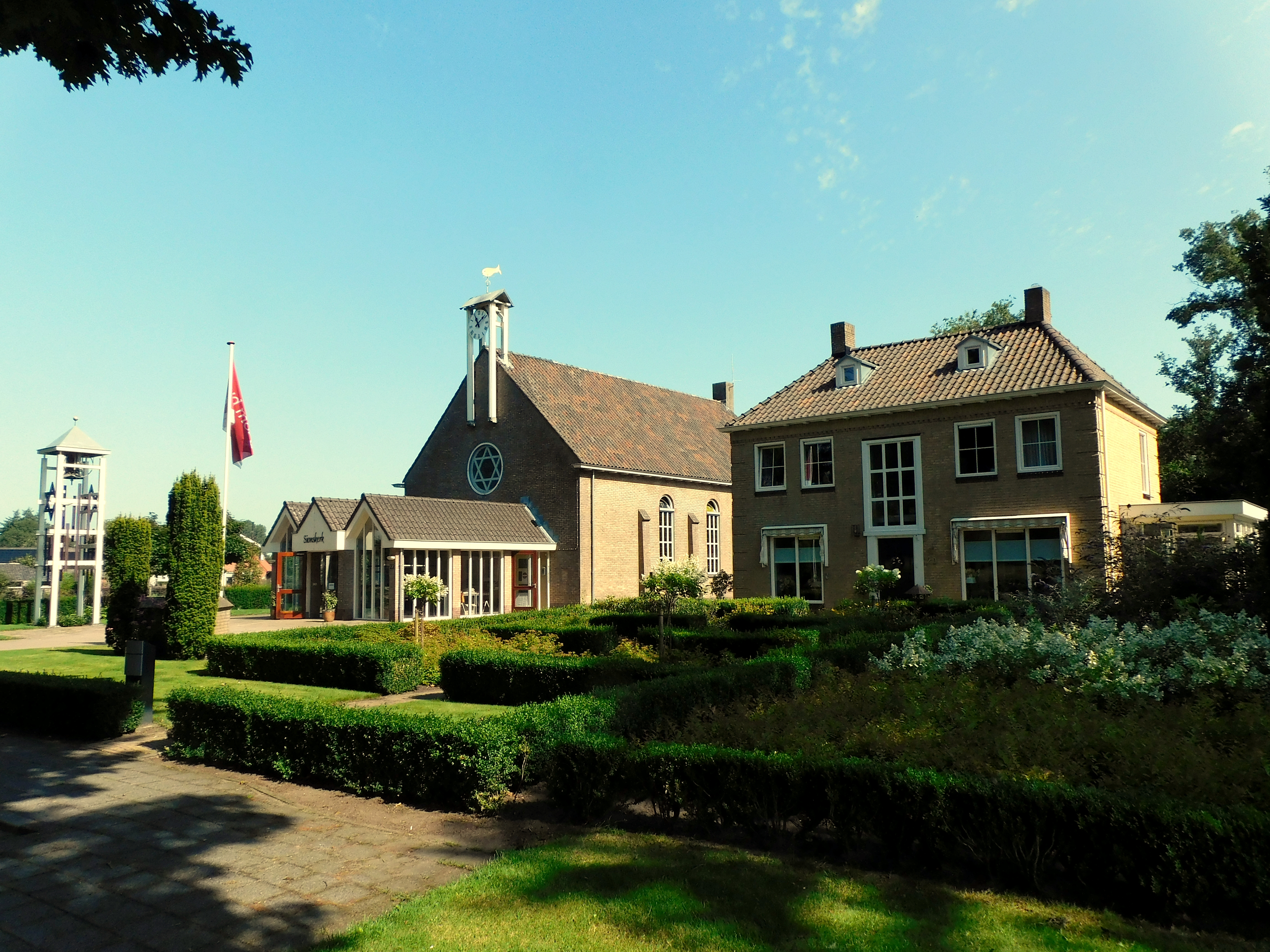
Church in Mariënberg
