= Emmen railway station =

Railway station in the Netherlands

Emmen
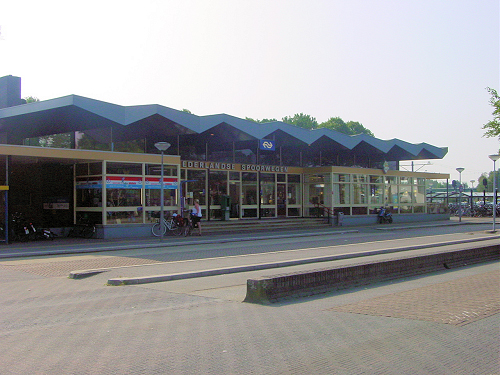

General information
- Location: Netherlands
- Coordinates: 52°47′25″N 6°53′57″E
- Line: Zwolle–Emmen railway
- Platforms: 2 side platforms

History
- Opened: 1 November 1905

Services
| Preceding station | Arriva Netherlands | Following station |
|---|---|---|
| Emmen Zuid towards Zwolle | Sneltrein 3800 | Terminus |
| Emmen Zuid towards Zwolle | Sneltrein 13800 Peak hours only | Terminus |
| Emmen Zuid towards Zwolle | Stoptrein 8000 | Terminus |
Location
- Location within Netherlands

Emmen is a terminus railway station located in Emmen, Netherlands. The station was opened on 1 November 1905 and is located on the Zwolle–Emmen railway. Train services are operated by Arriva.

The line continues for a short distance to a headshunt where trains can wait before returning, formerly the line continued onwards in a northerly direction with stations at Weerdinge, Exloo and Buinen, to a junction with the now closed line between Assen and Stadskanaal at Gasselternijveen. This closed in the late 1950s with the exception of a short freight only section from Gasselternijveen to Buinen which closed at the same time as Assen - Stadskanaal (early 1960s). Although the tracks have been removed, the remains of the track beds of both lines are still visible in the landscape. There are plans to reinstate the section between Emmen and Stadskanaal (and from there, connecting to the train to Veendam and Groningen).

== Train services ==
| Route | Service type | Operator | Notes |
|---|---|---|---|
| Zwolle - Ommen - Mariënberg - Hardenberg - Coevorden - Emmen | Local ("Stoptrein") | Arriva | 1x per hour |
| Zwolle - Ommen - Mariënberg - Hardenberg - Coevorden - Emmen | Express ("Sneltrein") | Arriva | 1x per hour |

== Bus services ==
| Line | Route | Operator | Notes |
|---|---|---|---|
| 1 | Emmen Station → Emmerhout → Angelslo → Ziekenhuis (Hospital) → Emmen Station | Qbuzz | |
| 2 | Emmen Station → Ziekenhuis (Hospital) → Angelslo → Emmerhout → Emmen Station | Qbuzz | |
| 3 | Emmen Station - Centrum (town centre) - Noordbarge - Rietlanden | | |
| 4 | Emmen Station - Centrum (town centre) - Bargeres | Qbuzz | |
| 12 | Emmen Station - Emmen Centrum (town centre) - Emmen Meerdijk - Emmen Bedrijvenpark A37 - Klazienaveen Centrum (village centre) - Klazienaveen Zuid | Qbuzz | |
| 21 | Assen - Rolde - Grolloo - Schoonloo - De Kiel - Schoonoord - Sleen - Erm - Emmen | Qbuzz and Taxi Dorenbos | |
| 22 | Assen - Graswijk - Hooghalen - Beilen - Westerbork - Wezup - Zweeloo (- Emmen) | Qbuzz and CTS | The route between Zweeloo and Emmen is only served during rush hours (excluding school breaks). |
| 26 | Emmen - Klazienaveen - Weiteveen - Schoonebeek - Coevorden | Qbuzz | No service on evenings. 1x per hour Mon-Sat, but only 2 runs on Sundays (around noon and around 18:00). |
| 27 | Hoogeveen - Noordscheschut - Geesbrug - Zwinderen - Gees - Oosterhesselen - Meppen - Aalden - Zweeloo - Emmen | Qbuzz | |
| 42 | Emmen - Emmer-Compascuum - Roswinkel/Barnflair - Ter Apel - Ter Wisch - Sellingen - Vlagtwedde | Qbuzz and CTS | During school breaks, this bus only operates between Emmen and Ter Apel. On weekdays evenings and Saturdays, this bus only operates between Emmen and Munsterscheveld. No service on Saturday evenings and Sundays. |
| 44 | Emmen - Zuidbarge - Erica - Amsterdamscheveld - Schoonebeek | Qbuzz | No service after 19:30 and on Sundays. |
| 59 | Gieten - Gasselte - Drouwen - Borger - Ees - Exloo - Odoorn - Klijndijk - Emmen | Qbuzz | |
| 73 | Stadskanaal - Musselkanaal - Ter Apel - Weerdinge - Emmen | Qbuzz | |
| 74 | Groningen - Westerbroek - Hoogezand - Kiel-Windeweer - Bareveld - Stadskanaal - Musselkanaal - Valthermond - Valthe - Weerdinge - Emmen | Qbuzz | |
| 75 | Emmen - Klijndijk - Valthe -) Valthermond - 2e Exloërmond - Musselkanaal - Stadskanaal | Qbuzz and Taxi De Grooth | Rush hours only, with a few extra runs between 13:10 and the start of the afternoon rush hour. |
| 112 | Borger → Emmen Station → Emmen Meerdijk | Qbuzz | Only 4 runs during morning rush hour. |
| 126 | Emmen - Klazienaveen - Barger Oosterveen - Weiteveen - Nieuw Schoonebeek | Qbuzz | Rush hours only, with a few extra runs between 13:00 and the start of the afternoon rush hour. |
| 217 | Groningen - Haren - Emmen - Nordhorn (Germany) - Hengelo (Netherlands) - Enschede - Münster (Germany) - Dortmund (- Siegen) - Frankfurt (- Mannheim) - Karlsruhe - Stuttgart (Germany) | Bentheimer Eisenbahn AG | Closed-door between Groningen and Haren and Hengelo and Enschede (i.e. no local service). Only 1 run per day from Groningen to Stuttgart and 1 run from Stuttgart to Groningen (the other 2 runs operate within Germany only), but during quieter periods, these runs are sometimes (partly) cancelled. |
| 300 | Groningen - Westlaren - Gieten - Borger - Emmen | Qbuzz | Closed-door within Groningen (i.e. one can only take this bus to/from Groningen). Some runs are operated with a double decker bus. |
| 922 | Emmen - Meppen (Germany) | Levelink | Only 1 run during the afternoon rush hour, 3 runs during non-rush hours and 4 runs on Saturdays. |

== See also ==
- List of railway stations in Drenthe
