= Hellendoorn =

- Town and municipality
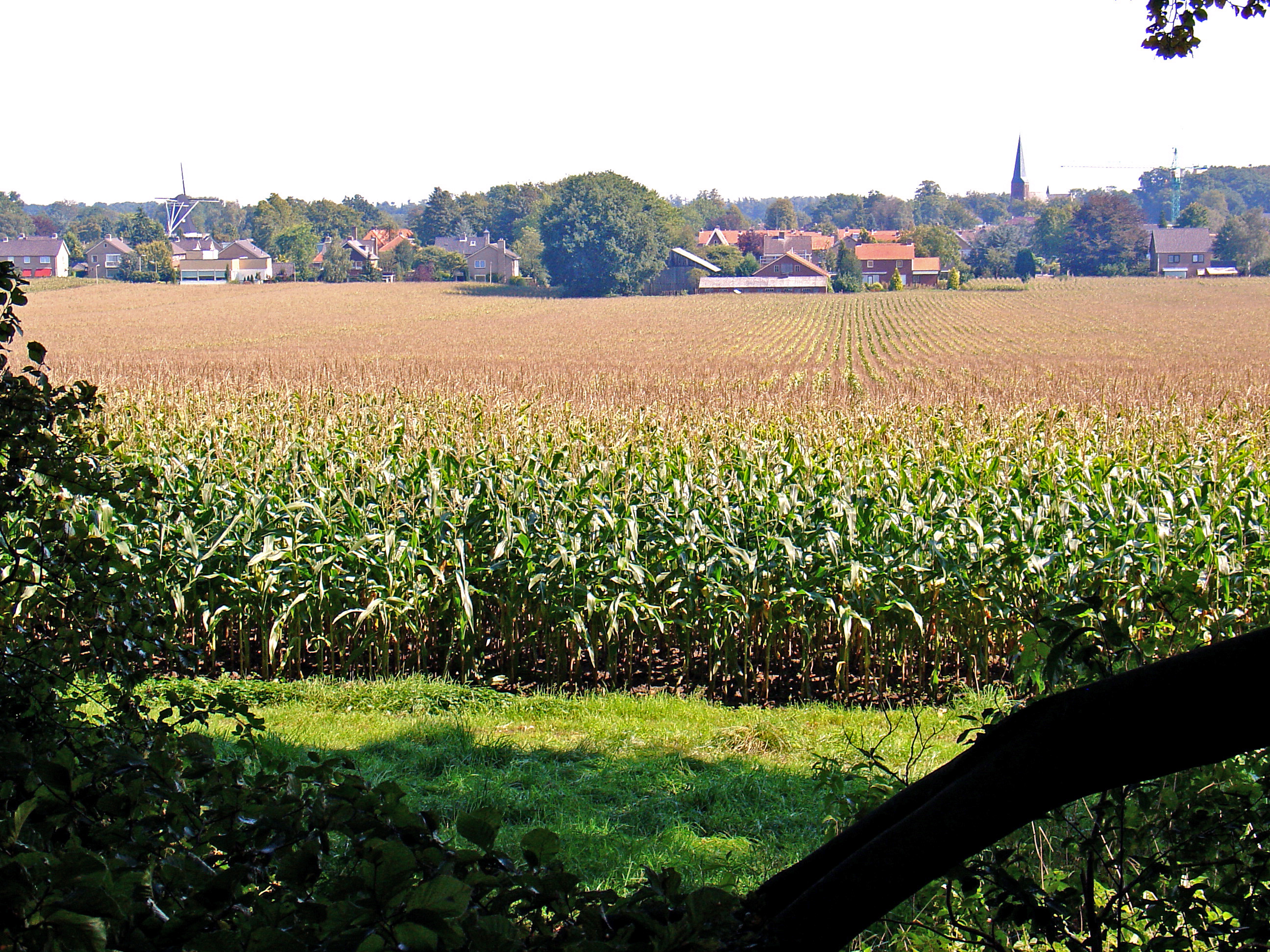
- Looking toward the Hellendoorn town centre

- Flag Coat of arms

- Location in Overijssel
- Coordinates: 52°22′N 6°28′E
- Country: Netherlands
- Province: Overijssel

Government
  - Body: Municipal council
  - Mayor: Jorrit Eijbersen (VVD)

Area
  - Total: 138.99 km^{2} (53.66 sq mi)
  - Land: 137.91 km^{2} (53.25 sq mi)
  - Water: 1.08 km^{2} (0.42 sq mi)
- Elevation: 10 m (33 ft)

Population (January 2021)
  - Total: 35,932
  - Density: 261/km^{2} (680/sq mi)
- Time zone: UTC+1 (CET)
  - Summer (DST): UTC+2 (CEST)
- Postcode: 7440–7449, 7687–7689
- Area code: 0546, 0548
- Website: www.hellendoorn.nl

Hellendoorn (Dutch: [ˈɦɛlə(n)doːr(ə)n]; Tweants: Heldern or Healndoorn) is a municipality and town in the middle of the Dutch province of Overijssel. As of 2019, the municipality had a population of 35,808.

There is an amusement park near the town of Hellendoorn called Avonturenpark Hellendoorn. At the outskirts of the town there is an ice cream factory from Unilever, where Ben & Jerry's is produced for the European market.

== Population centres ==
The municipality comprises:

Towns:

- Nijverdal (where the town hall is located)
- Hellendoorn

Hamlets:

- Daarle
- Daarlerveen
- Eelen en Rhaan
- Egede
- Haarle, Hellendoorn
- Hancate
- Hulsen (Overijssel)
- Marle, Hellendoorn
- Noetsele (former hamlet, now an integrated part of Nijverdal)

=== Topography ===
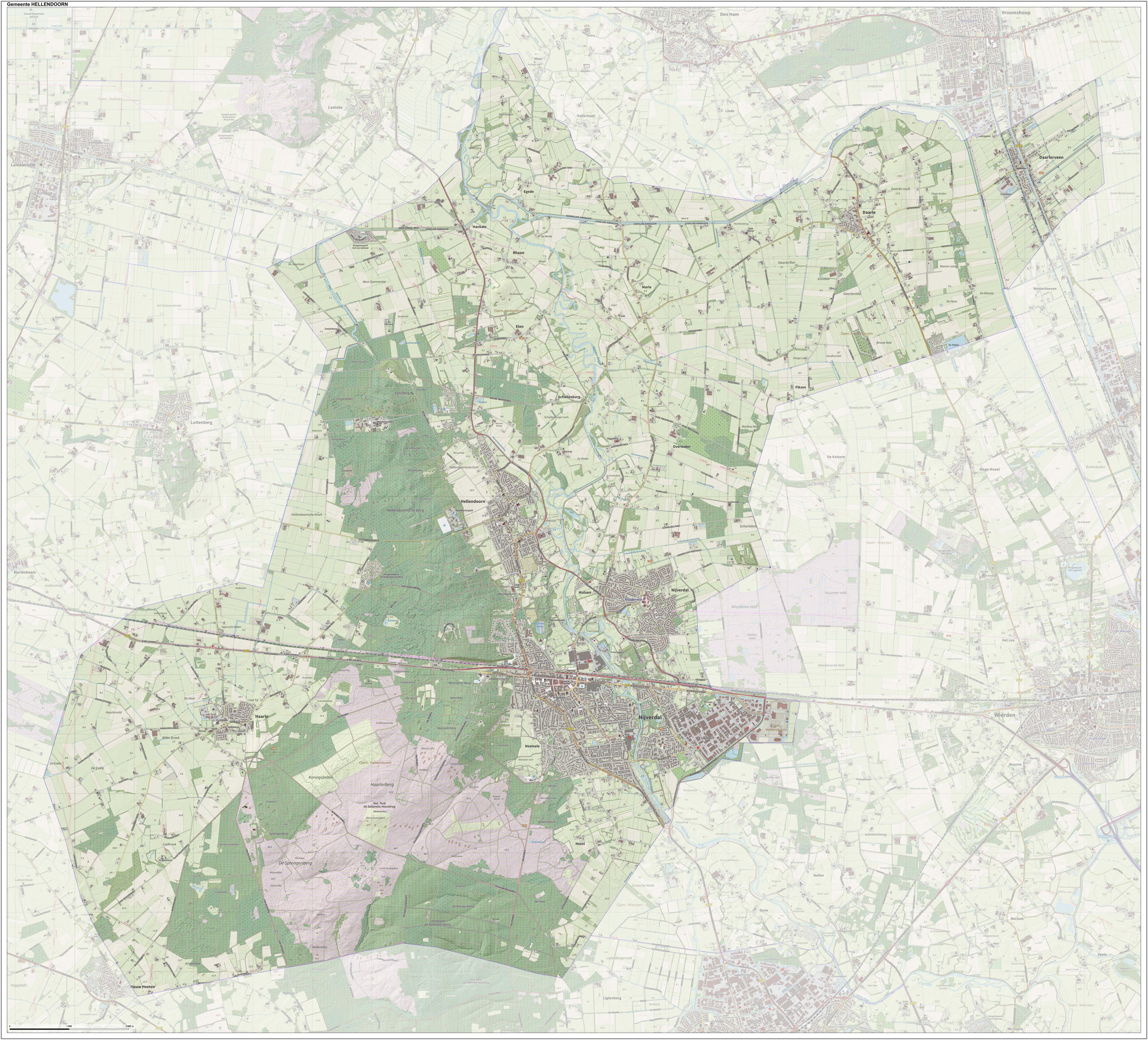

Dutch topographic map of the municipality of Hellendoorn, June 2015

== Geography ==
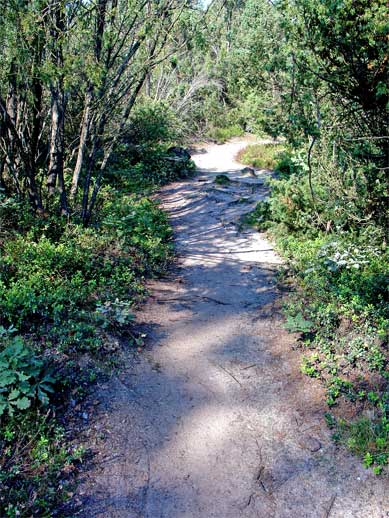
Noetselerberg

The central part of the municipality consists of a hilly and sparsely populated area that extends south into the municipality of Rijssen-Holten, called the Sallandse Heuvelrug (Salland Ridge). The highest point lies at about 70 metres (230 ft) above sea level and is part of the Noetselerberg. A large chunk of the area is covered by forest, but there are also heathlands. This scenery is now part of the Sallandse Heuvelrug National Park.

Originally part of the region of Salland, Hellendoorn is now administratively considered part of Twente; a fact reflected in the inclusion of Hellendoorn in the city region of Twente (Kaderwetgebied Regio Twente) as defined by the Dutch government.

== History ==
The municipality of Hellendoorn is the only place in the Netherlands where gold mining took place. However, mining for gold proved to yield close to nothing in the early 20th century. This is why searching for gold was soon completely abandoned.

The Germans operated a V-2 launching platform near the town of Hellendoorn during World War II, harassing the city of Antwerp.

On March, 22nd 1945, Nijverdal was severely bombed by allied bombers who were targeting the Zwolle-Almelo railway, which is located in town. Over 70 people were killed, mainly at the Grotestraat and Rijssensestraat.

A small part of the film A Bridge Too Far was filmed near Hellendoorn.

In 1955, part of the municipality of Wierden was annexed (Eversberg, Konijnenbelt, Slettenhaar and Lochter) which is the only part of the municipality located on originally Twente soil. In the late-1970s the quarter of 'het Lochter' arose here.

== Notable residents ==
- Ernst Bakker (1946 in Hellendoorn – 2014) a Dutch politician
- Douwe Draaisma (born 1953 in Nijverdal) a Dutch psychologist and academic
- Herman Ponsteen (born 1953 in Hellendoorn) Dutch track cyclist who won silver at the 1976 Summer Olympics
- Derk van Egmond (born 1956 in Hellendoorn) a Dutch track cyclist, competed in the 1984 Summer Olympics
- Wim Woudsma (1957 in Nijverdal – 2019) a Dutch footballer with 395 club caps

== Gallery ==
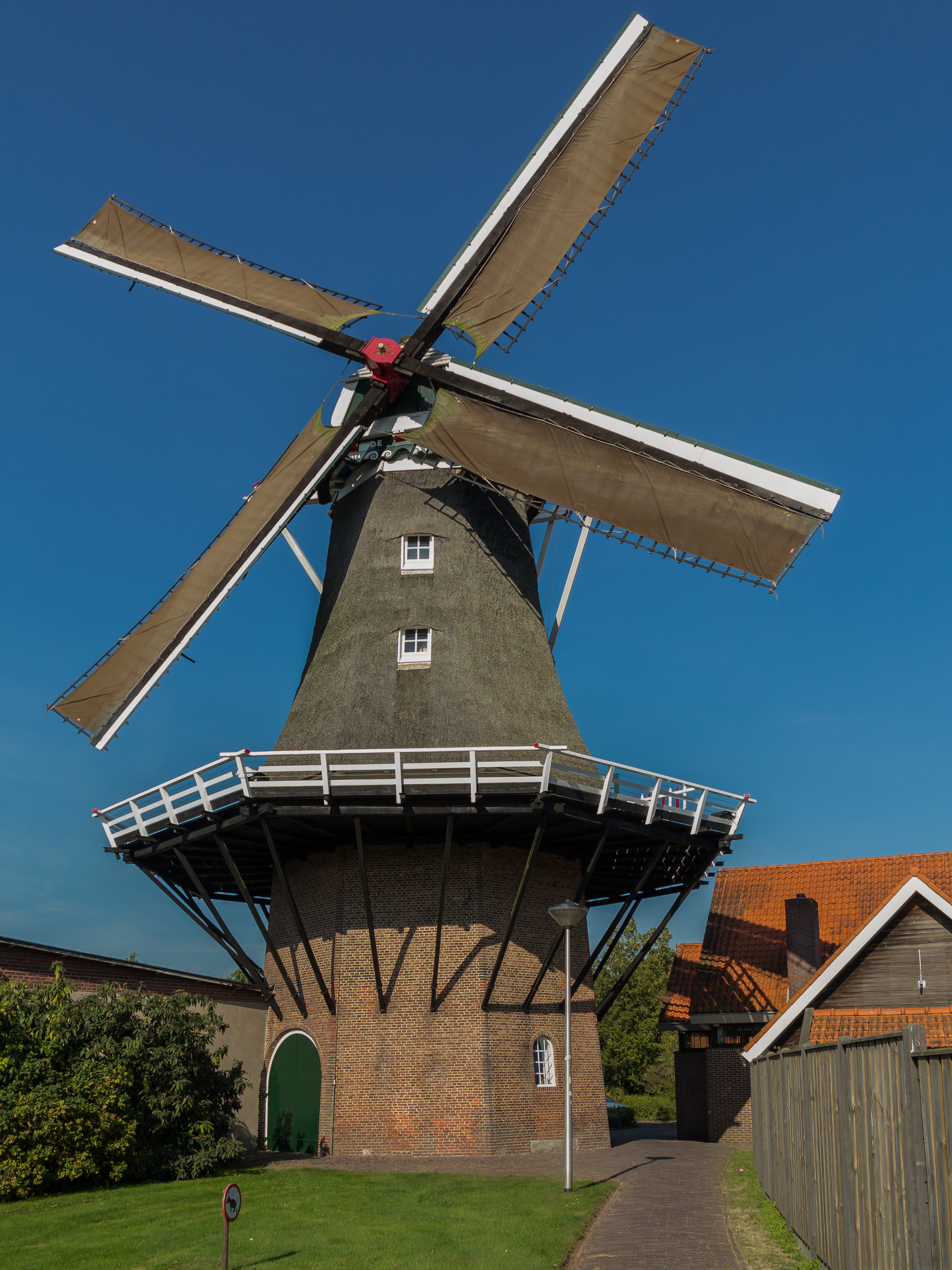
Hellendoorn, windmill: korenmolen de Hoop

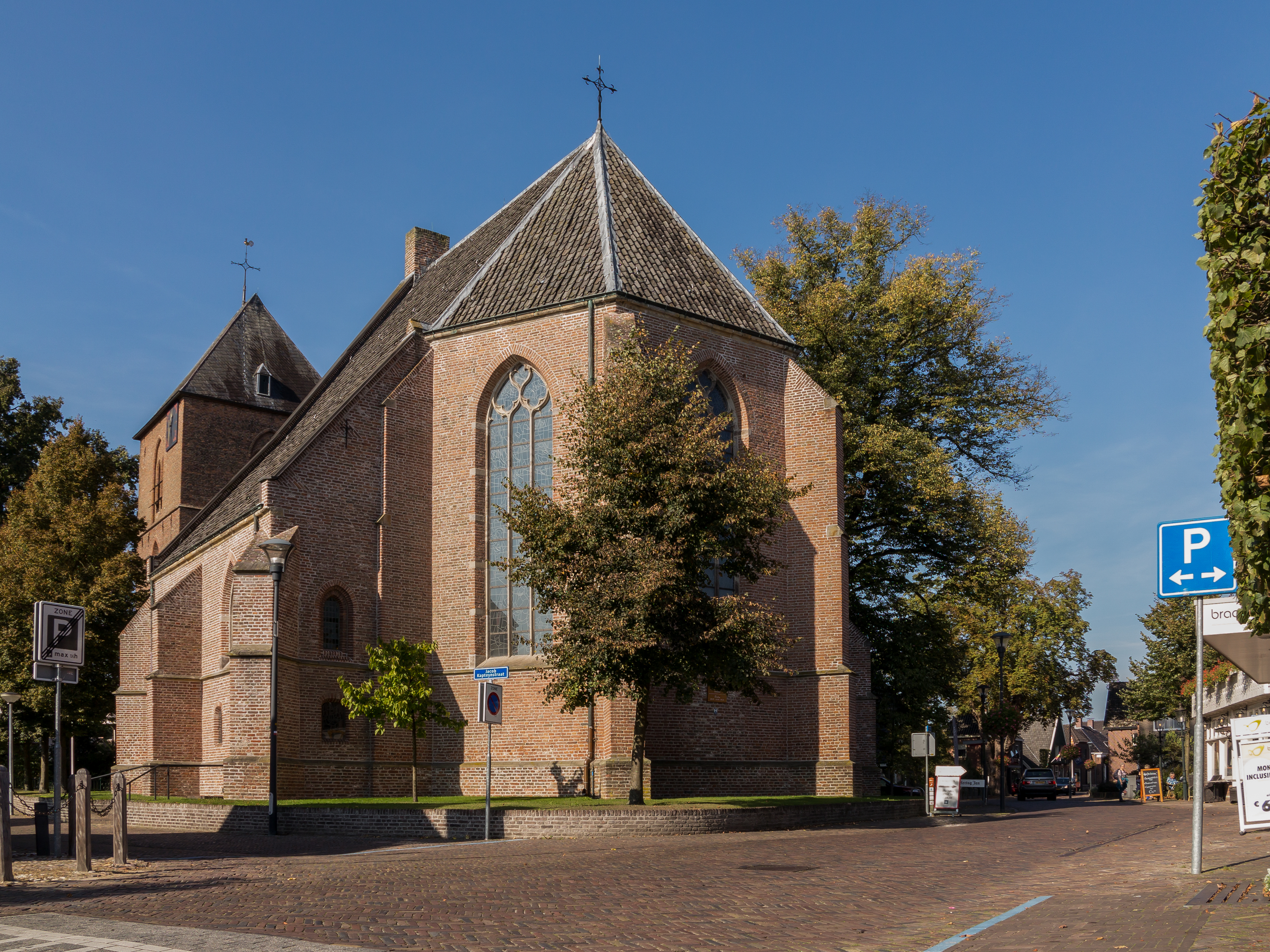
Hellendoorn, church: de Dorpskerk

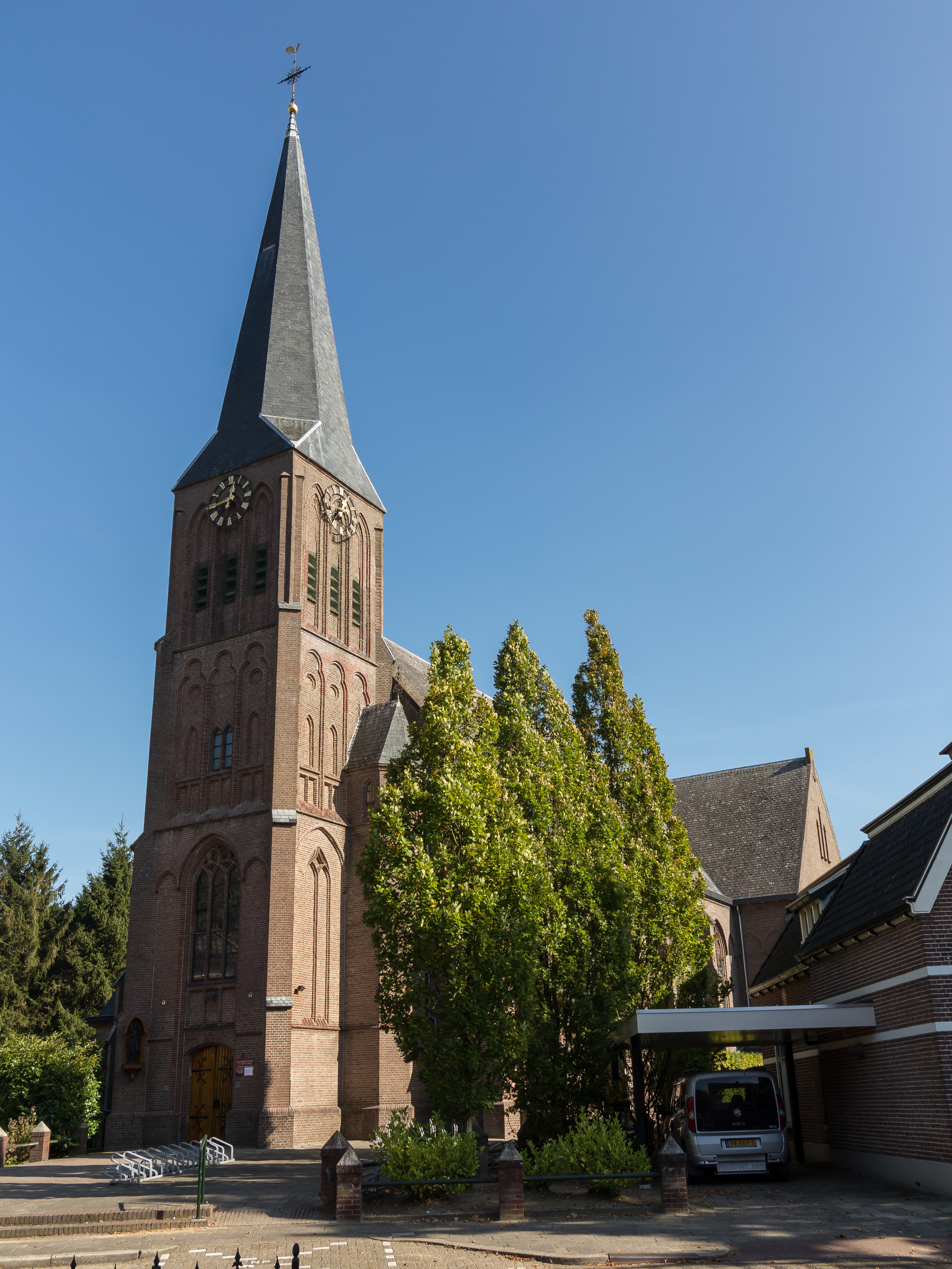
Hellendoorn, church: de Sint Sebastianuskerk

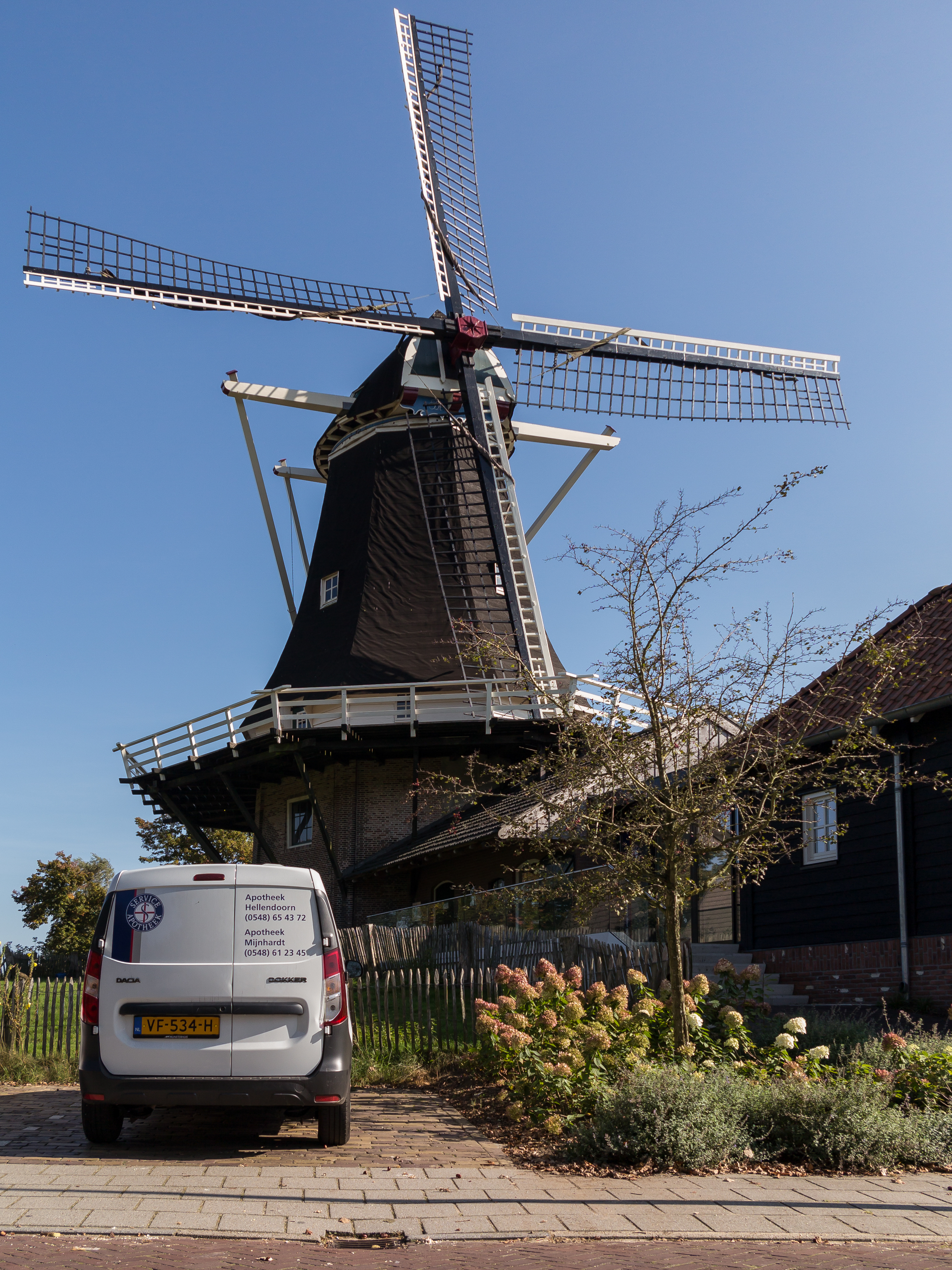
Hellendoorn, windmill: de Wippe (ook wel de Molen van Fakkert)

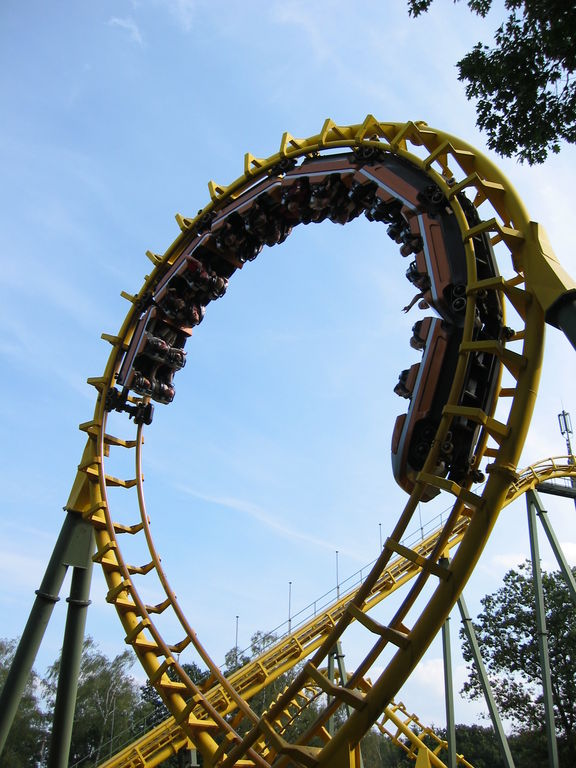
Hellendoorn, Rollercoaster Tornado

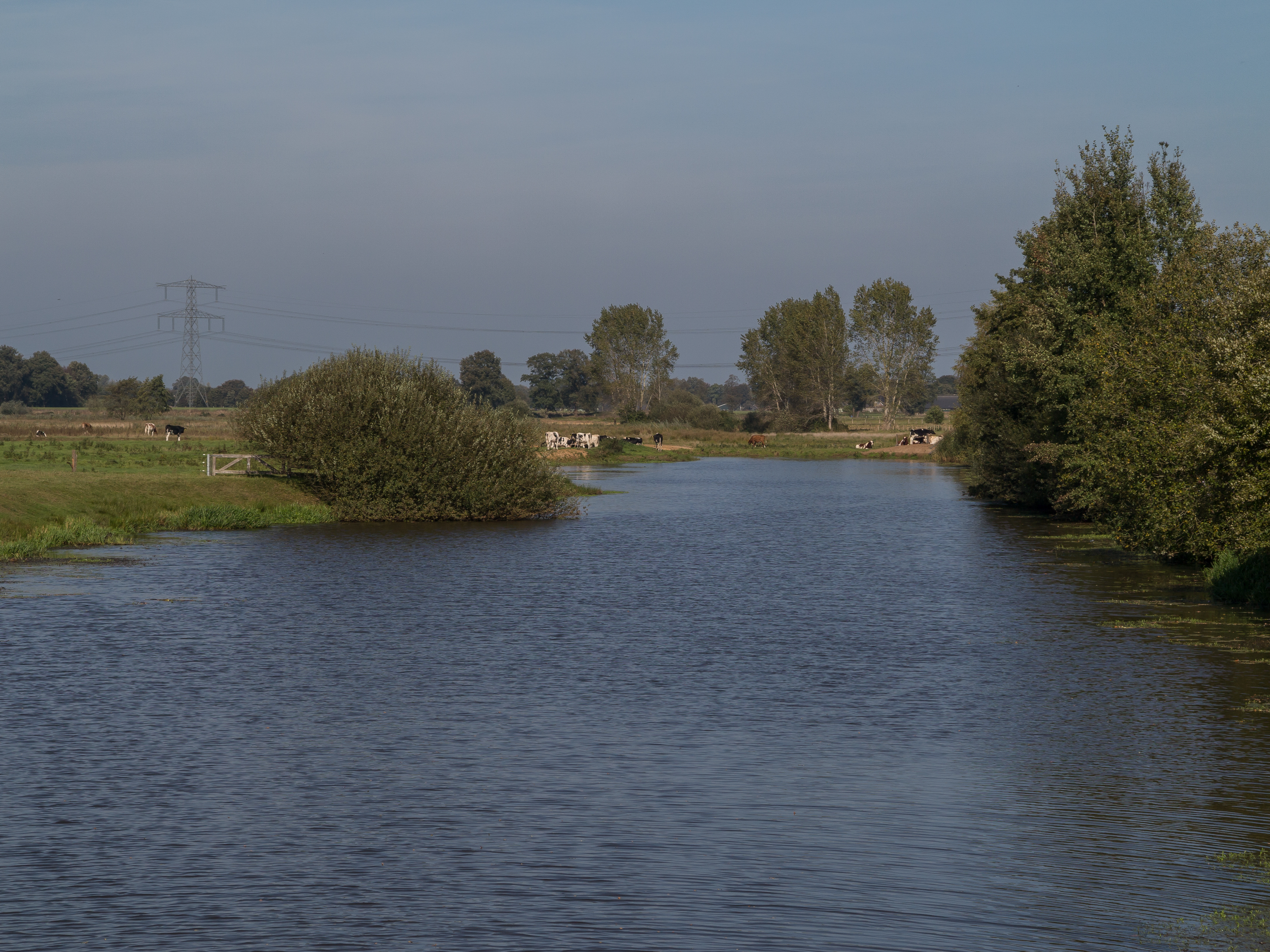
Between Hellendoorn and Daarle, river: de Regge

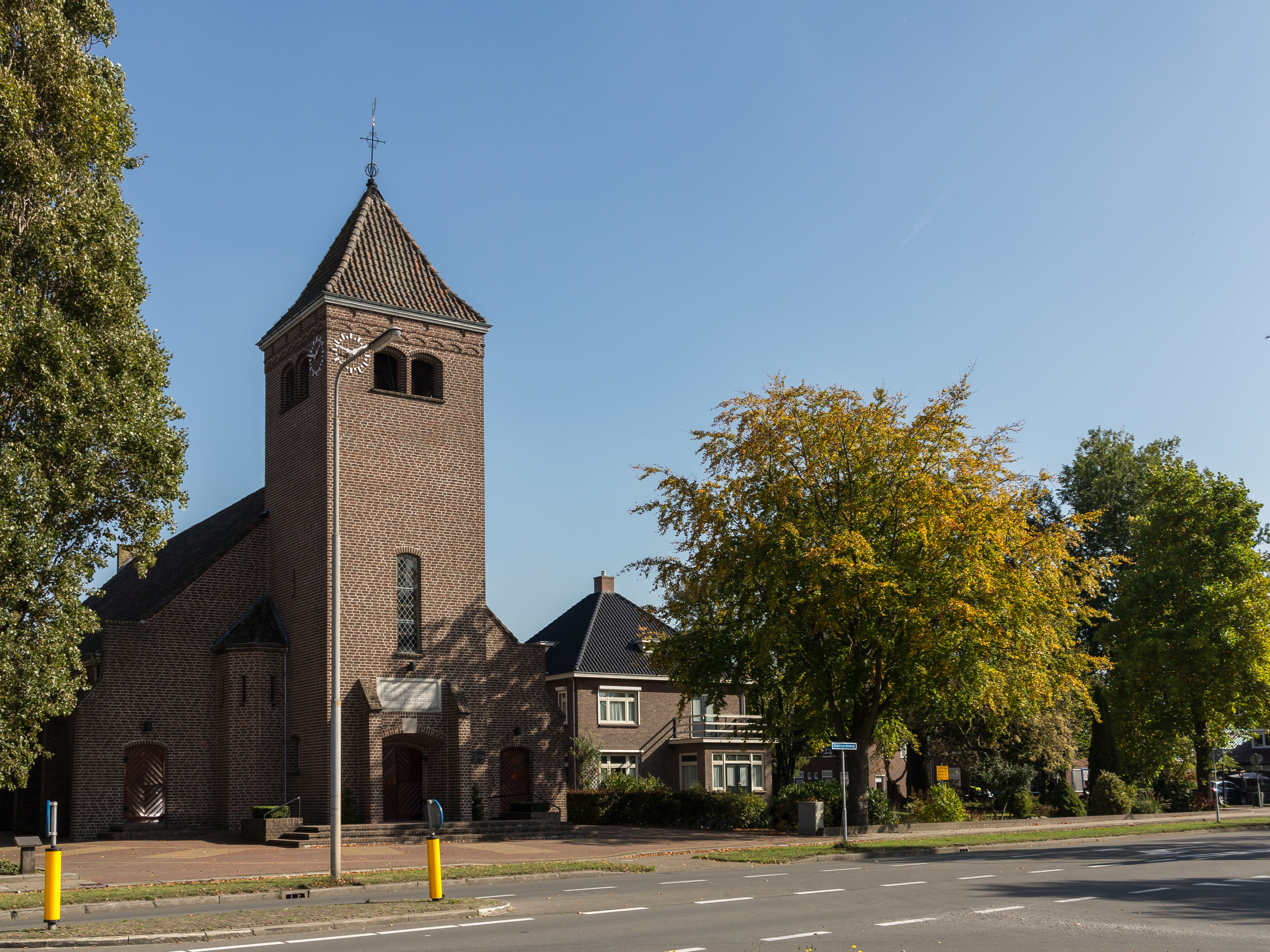
Daarle, reformed church

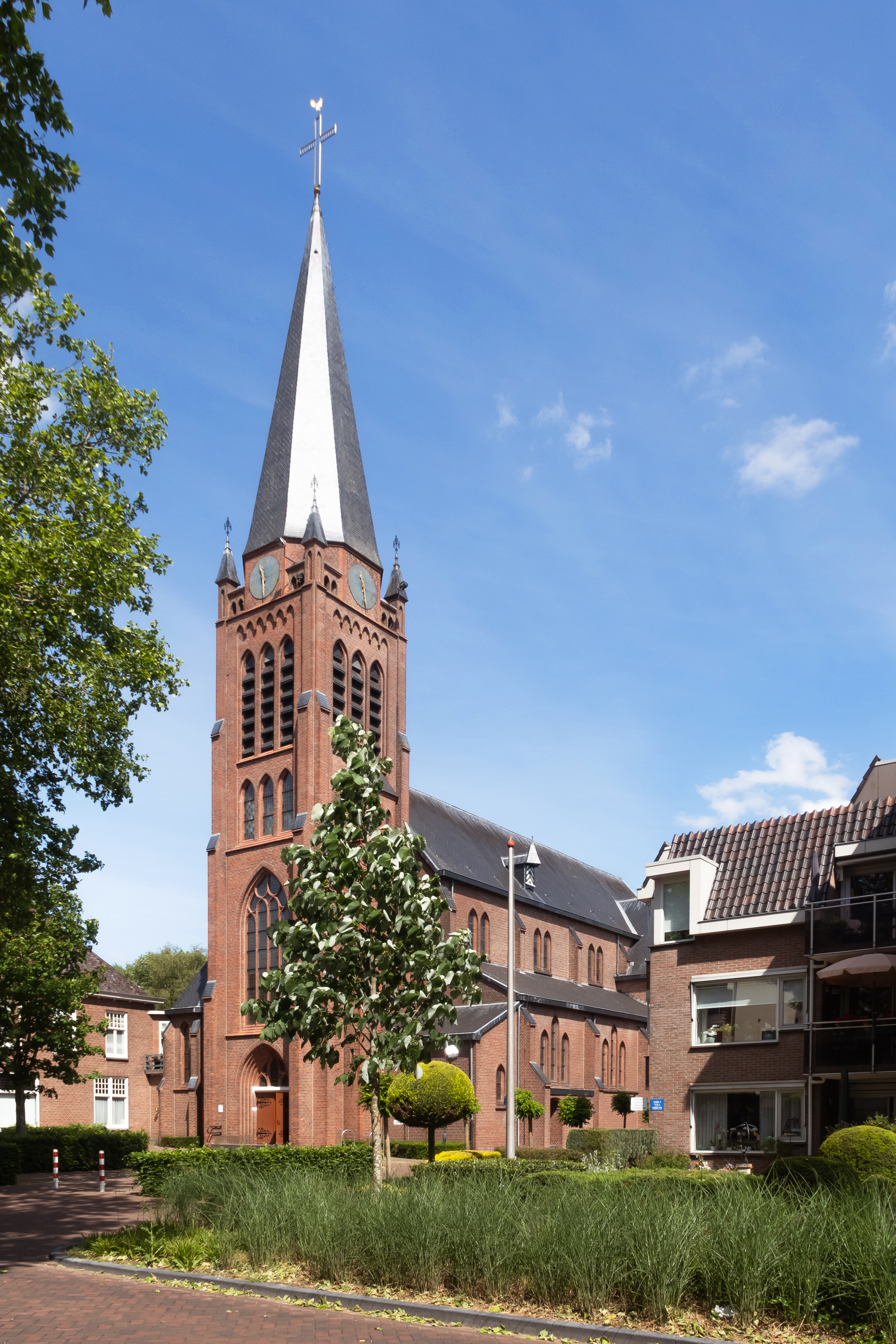
Nijverdal, church: de Antonius van Paduakerk
