= AV Atletics Nijverdal =

Coordinates: 52.363913°N 6.463265°E

ASV Atletics is a Dutch athletics club based in Nijverdal in the province of Overijssel. It was established in 1986. It has ±260 members. AV Atletics is affiliated to the Netherlands Athletics Federation.

== History ==
Since 1984, there is an organised group of runners in the community of Hellendoorn. In the beginning of 1985, this group decided to found AV Atletics.

== Accommodation ==
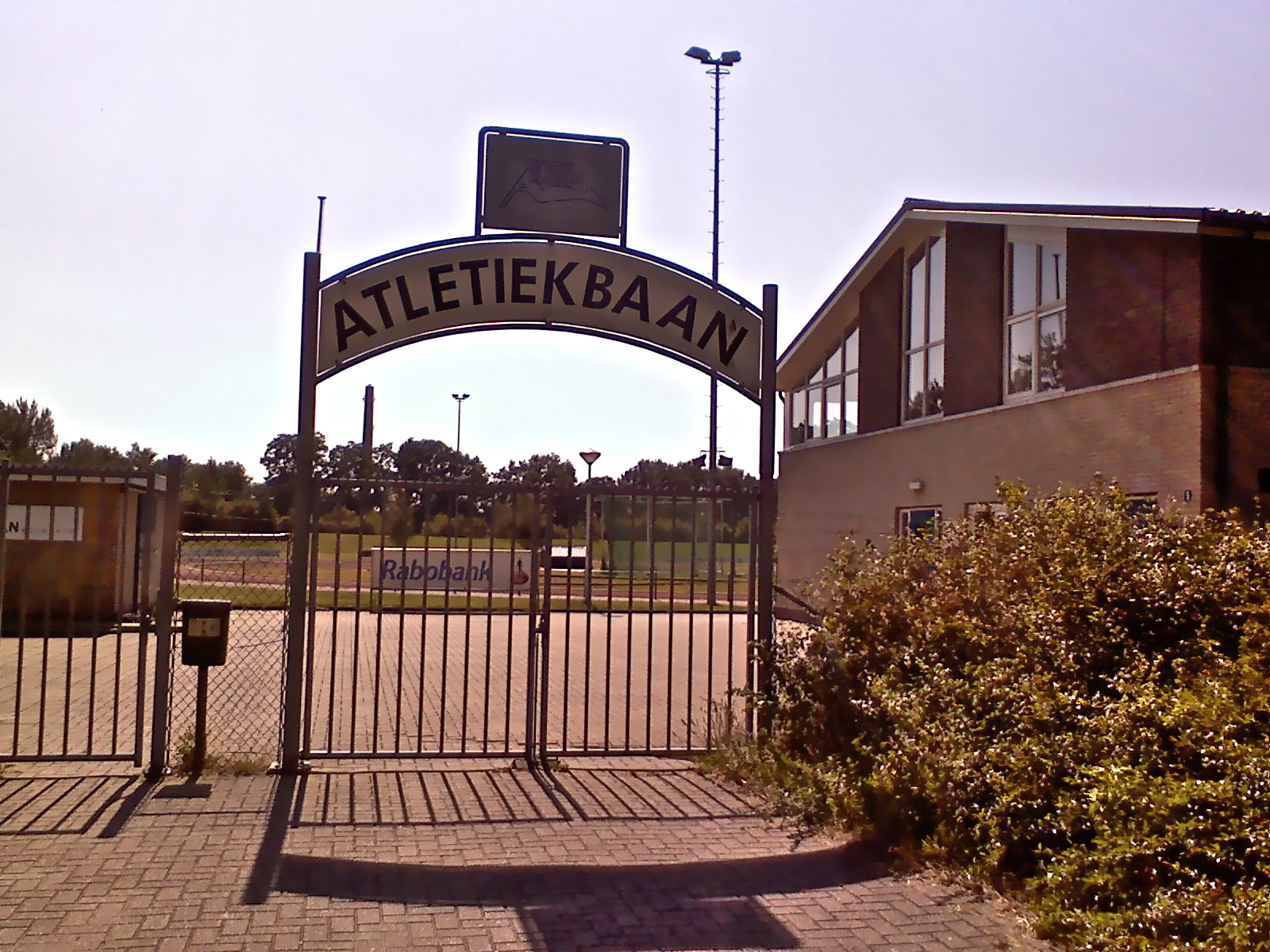
The accommodation of AV Atletics on the Van Heerdtweg in Nijverdal

Since November, 1997 AV Atletics is situated at their current location, in the middle of a nature reserve called De Groene Mal in the north of Nijverdal.

== Events ==
Each year, on the last Saturday in October, the Diepe Hel Holterbergloop (Diepe Hel Holterberg Run) is held by AV Atletics. The Diepe Hel Holterbergloop is one of the most beautiful and most exciting running events in The Netherlands.

In 2010 and 2011, AV Atletics is organizing the Dutch Cross Country Championships.
