= Egede, Netherlands =

Egede
- Hamlet
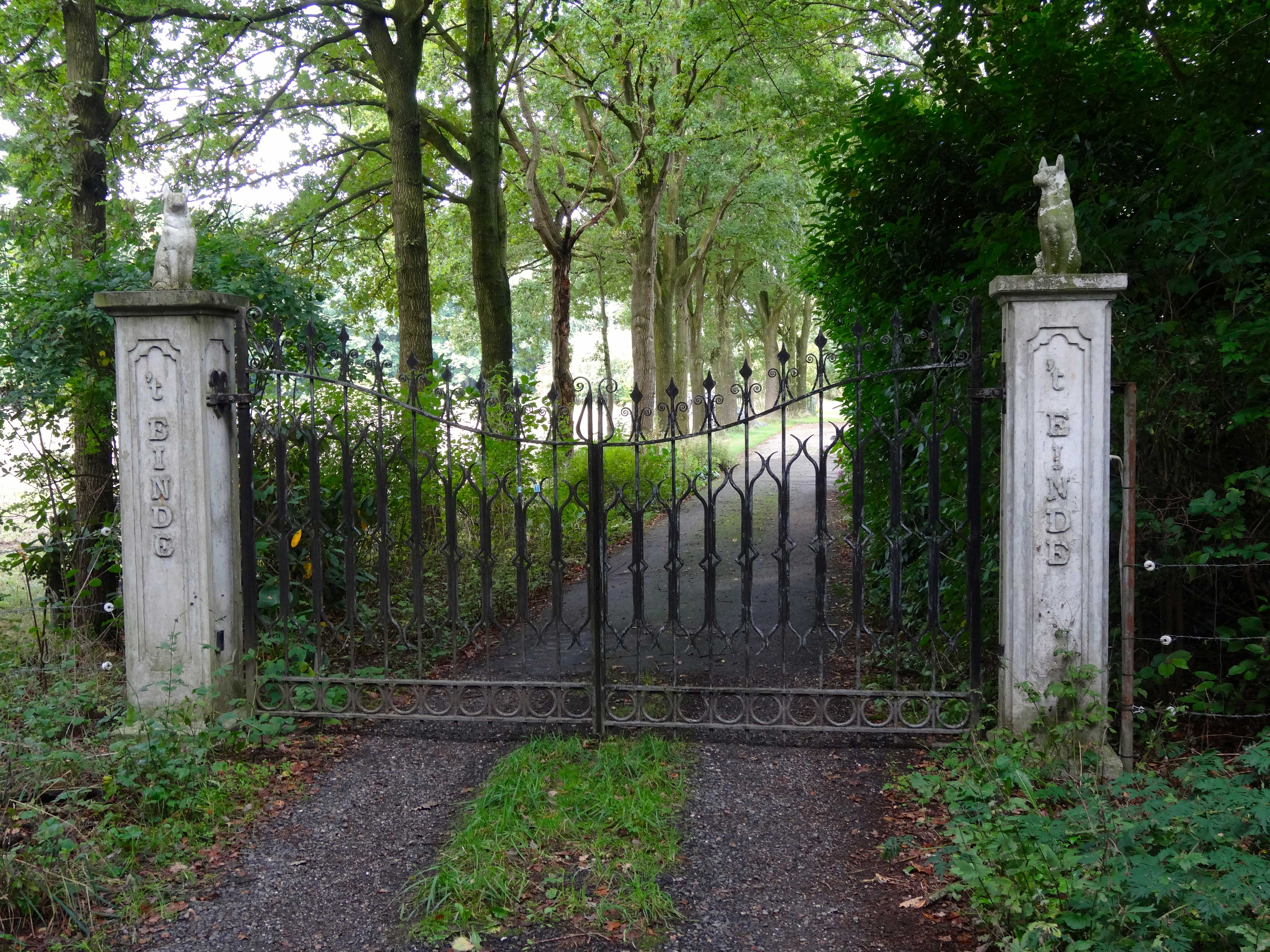
- Gates to the former havezate

- Location in the Netherlands Egede (Netherlands)
- Coordinates: 52.44009°N 6.45431°E
- Country: Netherlands
- Province: Overijssel
- Municipality: Hellendoorn

Area
  - Total: 19.73 km^{2} (7.62 sq mi)
- Elevation: 11 m (36 ft)

Population (2021)
  - Total: 815
  - Density: 41.3/km^{2} (107/sq mi)
- Time zone: UTC+1 (CET)
  - Summer (DST): UTC+2 (CEST)
- Postal code: 7447
- Dialing code: 0546

Egede is a hamlet in the Dutch province of Overijssel. It is located in the municipality of Hellendoorn, about 9 km north of the town of Nijverdal.

It was first mentioned in 1331 as Eghen. The etymology is unclear. The postal authorities have placed it under Hellendoorn. In 1840, it was home to 177 people. An havezate (manor house) was known to exist in Egede as early as 1382. It has long since been demolished, and only the gates remain.
