= Gesine Becker =

German activist and politician (1888–1968)

- Born: 16 April 1888; Germany
- Died: 9 December 1968 (aged 80)
- Occupation: Politician
- Political party: SPD; KPD; SED
- Spouse: Hans Gottwerth Becker
- Children: 1 d

Gesine Becker (born Gesine Bolte: 16 April 1888 – 9 December 1968) was a left wing German activist and politician. During the 1920s she was a Communist member of the Bremen state parliament ("Bürgerschaft").

During the Nazi period she remained in Germany but appears not to have been politically active. After the war she was an early member of the new Socialist Unity Party (Sozialistische Einheitspartei Deutschlands / SED) which after 1949 became the ruling party of the German Democratic Republic (East Germany), but never took on any position of influence within the party.

== Life ==
Gesine Bolte was born in Meinershausen (Osterholz), a suburb on the edge of the port city of Bremen. Her father was a smallholder. Her early jobs were as a domestic servant and as a shop assistant. Between 1911 and 1925 she also took work as a janitor/receptionist and as a clerk.

She joined the Social Democratic Party (Sozialdemokratische Partei Deutschlands / SPD) in 1910. The extent of her political activism during the ensuing fifteen years is apparent from public records and archives: her name appears frequently in police files. Relatively little information is accessible concerning her teenage years or on her life after 1930. Between 1919 and 1924 her name appeared on various candidate lists in connection with city elections, and her occupation was entered as "Housewife" which indicates that she never qualified for a trade or profession. At some stage she married Hans Gottwerth Becker, a carpenter who in 1921 became a Communist leader in Bremen.

In 1919 she and her husband switched political affiliations to the newly formed Communist Party. Some of the most intense revolutionary developments that followed military defeat in 1918 took place in the northern port cities, and the Beckers supported the Bremen soviet republic when it was proclaimed early in 1919. Gesine Becker was one of five Communist Bremen state parliament ("Bürgerschaft") members elected in 1920, and she was continued to be re-elected till 1930. The focus of her work in the chamber was on social policy, the condition of workers of women, and on the disadvantaged more generally. Her practical focus on health and social issues meant that she was generally able to stand aside from the bitter internal ideologically based feuding that was a feature of the German Communist Party in the 1920s. A successful campaign in the "Bürgerschaft" was for the repeal, in 1922, of a re-imposed expulsion for a Communist Worker, originally from the Netherlands, called Johann Geusendam (1866-1945). She was energetic in the debate on abortion rights, and campaigned against §218 of the constitution, in 1923 describing it in a speech as "discrimination against the female gender" ("Ausnahmebestimmung gegen das weibliche Geschlecht"). During the 1920s Gesine Becker was also a leading figure in the Bremen district Red Aid ("Rote Hilfe") political welfare organisation.

At the end of 1930 she relocated with her family to Berlin-Lichtenberg, probably in connection with her husband's work for the Communist Party. This appears to have put an end to her political prominence. Between 1934 and 1936 Gesine Becker is recorded as the owner of the "Cafe Derby" in Silesia Street, and between 1939 and 1945, which were years of war, she was conscripted to undertake clerical work.

After the war the entire region surrounding Berlin was administered as the Soviet occupation zone, which in its turn was relaunched as the Soviet sponsored German Democratic Republic (East Germany) in October 1949. After 1945 sources list Gesine Becker as a "housewife". Till 1955 she worked in a clerical capacity for "VEB Schrott Berlin-Lichtenberg", a state owned operation involved in rubbish and recycling. After 1955 she worked in the (inherently politically sensitive) personnel department at the university.
