= Wim Woudsma =

Dutch footballer (1957–2019)

Personal information
- Full name: Willem Woudsma
- Date of birth: 11 August 1957
- Place of birth: Nijverdal, Netherlands
- Date of death: 23 May 2019 (aged 61)
- Place of death: Nijverdal, Netherlands
- Position: Defender

Youth career
- Hulzense Boys

Senior career*
Years	Team	Apps	(Gls)
1976–1989	Go Ahead Eagles	376	(45)
1989–1990	N.E.C.	19	(0)
Total		395	(45)

International career
1977–1981	Netherlands U-21	9	(0)
- * Club domestic league appearances and goals

Willem "Wim" Woudsma (11 August 1957 – 23 May 2019) was a Dutch footballer who played as a defender.

== Playing career ==
=== Club ===
Born in Nijverdal, Woudsma started his career at local amateur side Hulzense Boys and later joined the FC Twente youth system. He made his senior debut for Go Ahead Eagles in August 1976 against Feyenoord, and played his entire professional career for the club except for his final season when he featured for N.E.C. He played in 430 official matches for Go Ahead, with only John Oude Wesselink (446) having more games for the club. After retiring he played for amateur side De Zweef in Nijverdal, where he also worked as a coach.

=== International ===
He earned 9 caps for the Netherlands national under-21 football team between 1977 and 1981 and played 4 games for the Dutch Olympic side.

== Managerial career ==
Woudsma coached at amateur sides De Zweef, Hulzense Boys and Enter Vooruit and he was a youth coach at Go Ahead Eagles.

== Personal life ==
His father Kas played as a goalkeeper for DES Nijverdal and in 26 matches for the Dutch Saturday League squad. Woudsma died in 2019 after a long illness.
