= Douwe Draaisma =

Dutch writer, university teacher and psychologist

- Portrait of Douwe Draaisma, made by Sake Elzinga
- Born: 1953 (age 72–73); Nijverdal, Overijssel, Netherlands
- Occupations: Professor of psychology, writer
- Children: Arjan Petrus Draasima
- Website: http://douwedraaisma.nl

Douwe Draaisma (Nijverdal, 1953) is a Dutch psychologist and university professor who specializes in the basis and mechanisms of the human memory. He studied psychology and philosophy at the University of Groningen, where he is now a professor by special appointment in the history of psychology. He holds the Heymans Chair. Draaisma was appointed Officer of the Order of Orange-Nassau for his achievements in the academic world in April 2014.

== Career ==
Draaisma is the author of a number of very successful books, which have been translated into twenty-five languages. He received several awards for his Waarom het leven sneller gaat als je ouder wordt. The book was translated into English (Why life speeds up as you get older), French (Pourquoi la vie passe plus vite à mesure qu'on vieillit) and German (Warum das Leben schneller vergeht, wenn man älter wird: von den Rätseln unserer Erinnerung). On 25 April 2014 Draaisma was appointed Officer of the Order of Orange-Nassau for his achievements in the academic world.

== Bibliography (sel.) ==
- Metaphors of Memory. Groningen: Historische Uitgeverij, 1995 (Third revision 2003)
- Why life speeds up as you get older. Groningen: Historische Uitgeverij, 2001
- Disturbances of the Mind. Groningen: Historische Uitgeverij, 2006
- The Nostalgia Factory. Groningen: Historische Uitgeverij, 2008
- Forgetting. Groningen: Historische Uitgeverij, 2010
- The Dreamweaver. Groningen: Historische Uitgeverij, 2013
- If My Memory Doesn't Deceive me. Groningen: Historische Uitgeverij, 2016 ISBN 9789065540430

== Awards ==
- Heymans Award 1990
- Jan Greshoff Award 2002
- Jan Hanlo Essay Award 2003
- Eureka! Award, 2003
