= Holten =

- Town
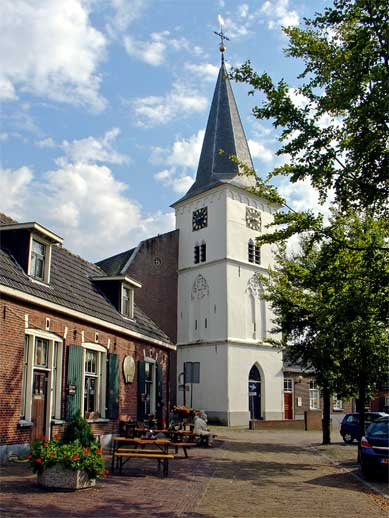
- Church

- Flag Coat of arms

- Location in the province of Overijssel in the Netherlands Holten (Netherlands)
- Coordinates: 52°16′53″N 6°25′07″E
- Country: Netherlands
- Province: Overijssel
- Municipality: Rijssen-Holten

Area
  - Total: 5.16 km^{2} (1.99 sq mi)
- Elevation: 20 m (66 ft)

Population (2021)
  - Total: 9,410
  - Density: 1,820/km^{2} (4,720/sq mi)
- Time zone: UTC+1 (CET)
  - Summer (DST): UTC+2 (CEST)
- Postal code: 7451
- Dialing code: 0548
- Website: www.rijssen-holten.nl

Holten (Dutch Low Saxon: Hooltn) is a village in the municipality of Rijssen-Holten in the Dutch province of Overijssel. Holten is located in a forested area just south of the Holterberg, a 65-metre (210 ft) hill, and is part of the Sallandse Heuvelrug National Park. The National Park is the only area in the Netherlands in which the black grouse (in Dutch: korhoen) can be found. This grouse population is on the brink of extinction, so parts of the National Park are closed to the public during its breeding season.

== Holten Canadian War Cemetery ==
Holten Canadian War Cemetery is the second-largest World War II cemetery in the Netherlands and is administered by the Commonwealth War Graves Commission. It is located in a forested area 3 kilometres (1.9 mi) north-east of Holten railroad station, and is accessible by car or bicycle via a number of sand roads. Canadian Prime Minister Stephen Harper visited the cemetery on May 4, 2015, in commemoration of the 70th anniversary of Victory in Europe Day.

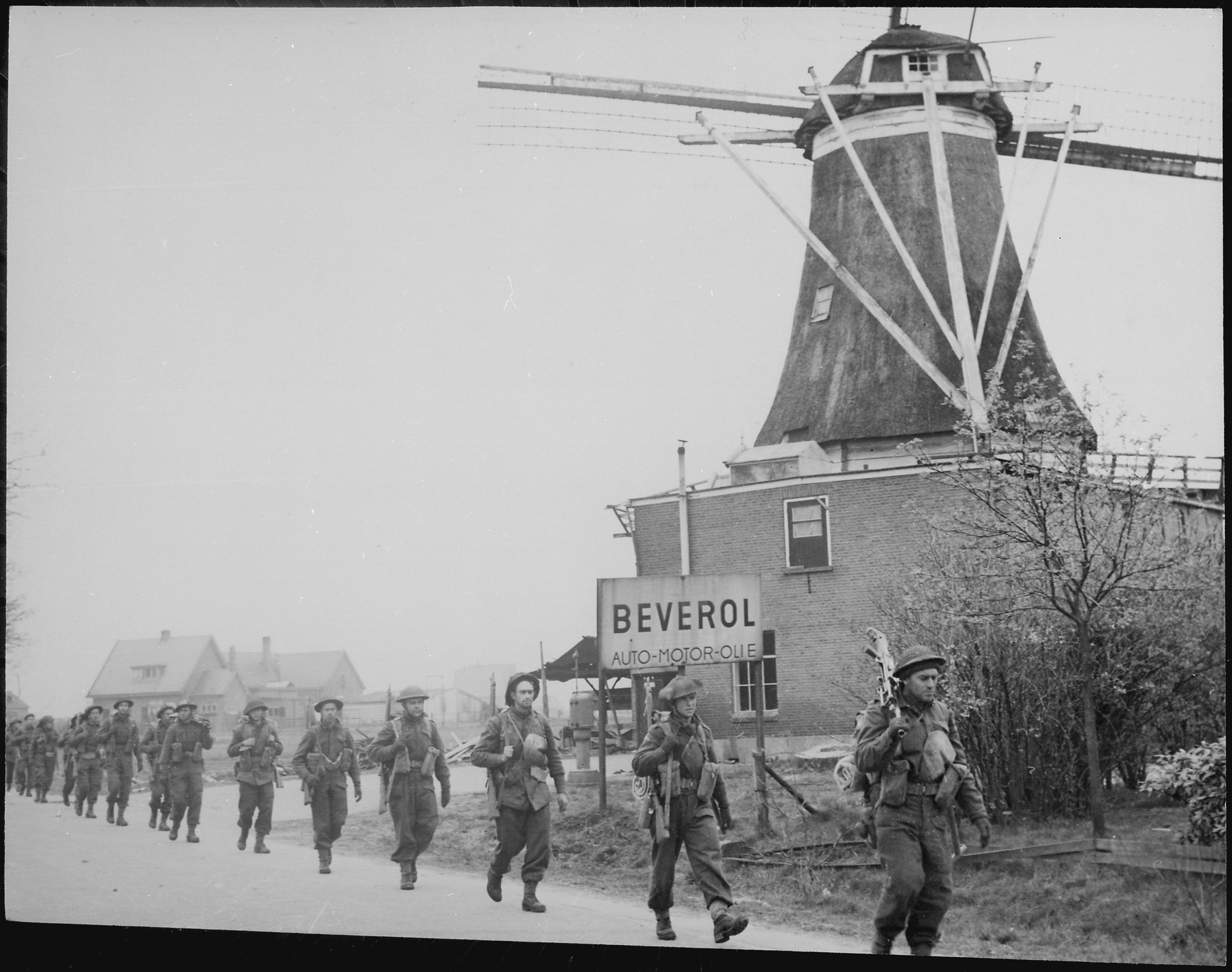
Canadian troops move through Holten, April 1945

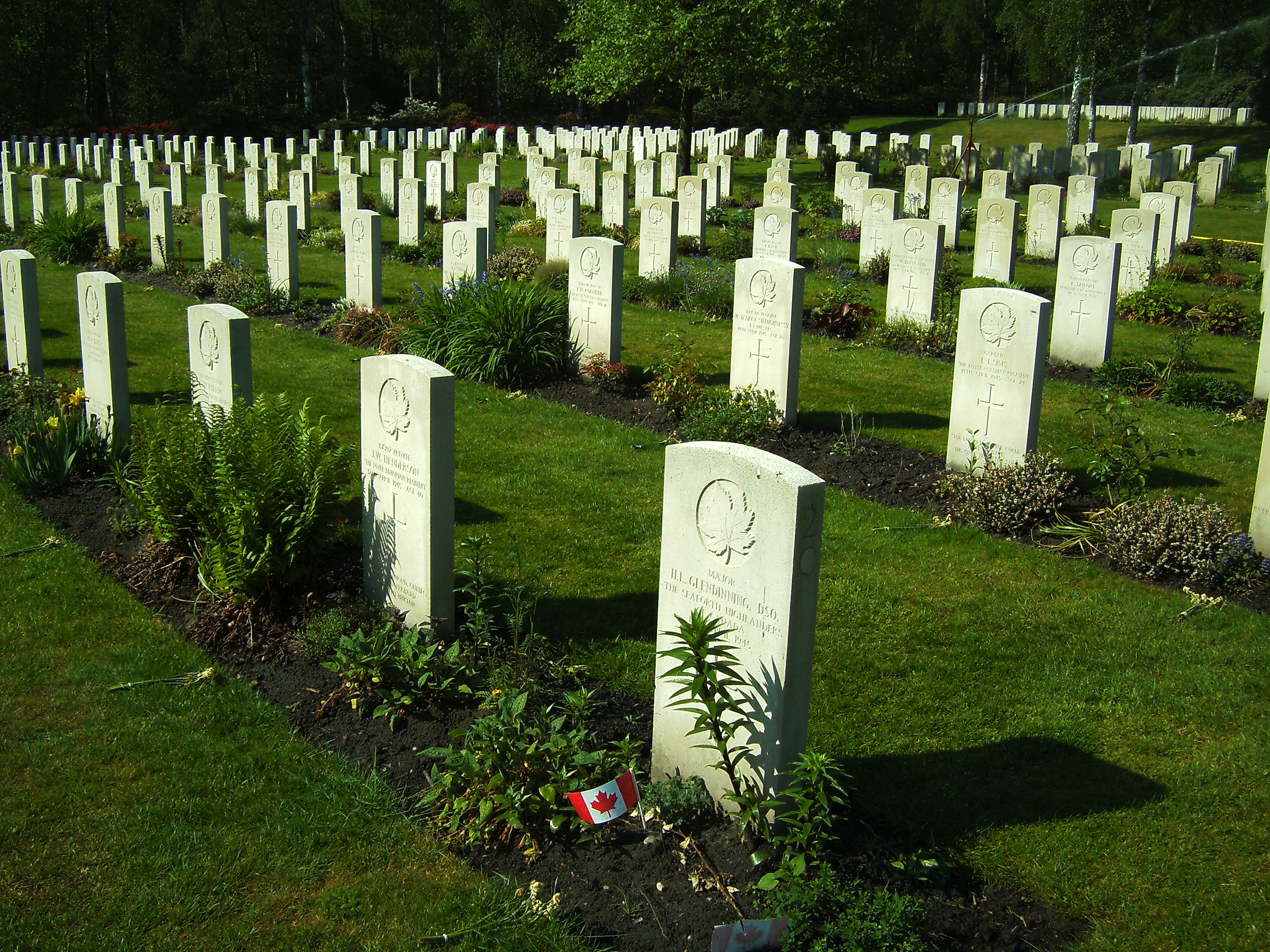
Canadian cemetery in Holterberg

== Notable residents ==
Holten is the home village of Olympic 1500m speed skating gold medalist Mark Tuitert, jazz trombonist Wolter Wierbos, professional darts player Danny Jansen and film and documentary director and Academy Award winner Bert Haanstra.

== Dialect ==
As well as Standard Dutch, local inhabitants speak a variety of Dutch Low Saxon, which is considered to be part of the Sallaands sub-dialect, with a few Tweants traits that are a natural result of the village's proximity to Twente. While in surrounding communities the use of dialect is relatively widespread, Holten has seen a decline over the past few decades.
