= Johann Geusendam =

Dutch politician

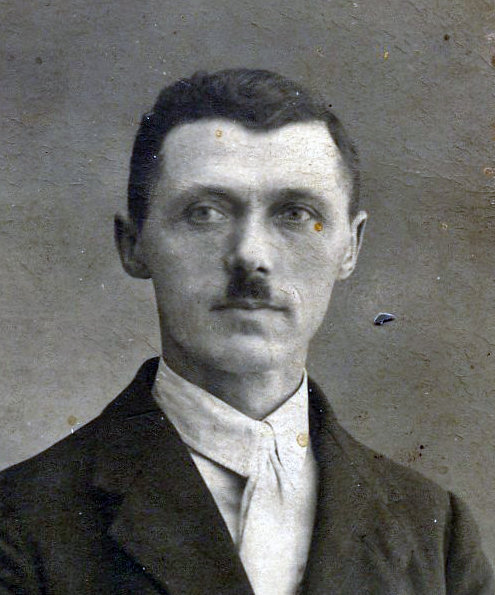
- Born: Johann Mathias Geusendam; 24 February 1886; Rijssen, Netherlands
- Died: 6 April 1945 (aged 59); Vaihingen an der Enz, Württemberg-Hohenzollern, Germany
- Occupations: Migrant worker Political activist Resistance activist
- Political party: KPD; CPN
- Spouse: Katharine Johanne Sophie Friederike Cordes
- Children: 1. 2.Johann Wilhelm Geusendam (1911–1987)

Johann Mathias Geusendam (24 February 1886 – 6 April 1945) was a Dutchman who moved with his fiancée to Bremen in 1905 in order to improve his job. Bremen was a geographically small but industrially, commercially and economically dynamic "autonomous component state" which had become part of Germany in 1871.

Geusendam was politically engaged and became increasingly active. This came to the attention of the authorities. In 1908, after taking part in a strike, still aged only 22, he was identified as a "troublesome foreigner" ("lästiger Ausländer") and deported from Bremen. Till 1933 Germany resisted pressure to copy the Anglo-French model of an ever more centrally controlled state, and Geusendam's expulsion became the focus of a thirty year foreign policy debate in the Bremen Bürgerschaft (parliament) as to whether or not depriving a man of citizens' rights fell within the competence of the city authorities and their senate.

One reason that Geusendam was the focus of the debate for so long is that after his expulsion he soon returned, illegally, to Bremen for family reasons, and the authorities grudgingly suspended his expulsion. He was expelled again in 1921 but managed, with the support of the labour movement, to remain in Bremen till 1931, when he really was expelled. The family relocated briefly to the Soviet Union. Later he fell foul of the Hitler government as a result of his political activities in the border region between the Netherlands and Germany. He was arrested in 1940 and held in government detention at a succession of institutions till, through physical mistreatment and malnutrition, he died in April 1945.

== Biography ==
Johann Mathias Geusendam was born at Rijssen, a country town in the flatlands between Apeldoorn and Enschede. This part of the Netherlands was becoming increasingly polarised in religious terms, and in 1890 his Catholic family moved away from the little town where they were finding it impossible to find work because power and influence had become monopolized by members of the ultra-orthodox Calvinist community. The Geusendams relocated across the border to Ahaus. In 1905 Johann Geusendam teamed up with Katharina Cordes, originally from Oldenburg and the two of them moved on to Bremen. They subsequently married. Johann Geusendam began to involve himself politically in the Bremen Labour movement. By 1908 he was working in a steel tube mill where on 1 May 1908 he took part in a May Day strike. He was singled out as a "troublesome foreigner" ("lästiger Ausländer"). It was said that he had threatened a strike-breaker and stolen wax with a value of 70 pfennigs: he was expelled from Bremen. He returned to the city illegally following the birth of his first son. The authorities now provisionally suspended the expulsion order on condition that he would keep out of trouble and care for his wife and child. He was kept under police surveillance, however.

During the period of the short-life Bremen Soviet, in the winter of 1918/1919, he was repeatedly arrested by the Reichswehr (national militia) and by members of "Freikorps" volunteer units, composed largely of former members of the old German army who had come together to resist a rerun in Germany of Petrograd's October Revolution. In 1922 the authorities prepared to enact Geusendam's expulsion, which had never been formally rescinded, because of his "active membership" of the recently founded Communist Party. His fate was discussed with some passion in the Bürgerschaft (Bremen parliament), and in the end, on the day the vote was taken, two conservative members were away. By a narrow majority the assembly voted to reverse the senate's decision. Bremen was an industrial port city and the political left-wingers who were powerfully present in the parliament at that time were persuaded that Geusendam's political opinion – the point on which the "bourgeois" conservative members had chosen to focus the argument – was not a justification for expelling a man and his family from Bremen. Geusendam, his wife and their two sons remained for the time being. But the family were never able to relax completely. Years later Wilhelm Geusendam, Johann Geusendam's son, would remember the children being woken up by their mother at four in the morning during the crisis year of 1923 so that they might say good bye to their father who was being taken into "protective custody". The detention did not last long on this occasion, but further troubles followed. While cleaning out this inside of a boiler, Johann's father was killed in an industrial accident at the vast textiles plant where he worked. Another near relative was killed in a mine disaster. Johann Geusendam himself was unemployed for much of this period.

For a long time, despite intensively researching the matter, the police found no sufficient reason to implement the Geusendams' expulsion. Eventually, on 31 March 1931, the Senator responsible for policing, Senator Deichmann put his signature to the necessary document. On 18 March 1931, after more than 23 years of living with the uncertainty set off by the original expulsion order, Geusendam and his family returned from Bremen to the Netherlands. The increasing polarisation of German politics had opened the way for the "conservative" members of the city government to have their way. Even after the family had left the city, there was a final heated discussion of the matter in the Bremen Bürgerschaft (parliament). A submission from the Workers' Singing Association provided the parliamentarian Gesine Becker with a final opportunity to berate fellow members over the "political justification" of the expulsion order.

For Geusendam the expulsion to the Netherlands could also be seen as an opportunity, and as soon as their younger son had completed his school exams the family moved to the Soviet Union to experience "real-life socialism" ("real existierenden Sozialismus“ "). It is not entirely clear what they found or what they did there, but three years later, in 1934, the Geusendams returned to the Netherlands thoroughly disillusioned. The chasm between idealistic aspirations and what was possible seems to have been unbridgable. Back in the Netherlands Johann Geusendam left his wife and younger son to live on welfare. (The elder son, Wilhelm, returned to Moscow for another year.) Johann Geusendam, despite the disappointments of the three years in the Soviet Union, had lost none of his own political passion.

The situation Germany changed at the beginning of 1933 when the National Socialists took power and lost no time in transforming the country into a one-party dictatorship. Those with any sort of a political record – especially, after February 1933, if that record involved the Communist Party – came under surveillance and were over the next few months arrested. Others fled. Johann Geusendam, now based close to the German frontier in the Netherlands and a member of the Enschede branch of the Dutch Communist Party, worked with the International Red Aid (workers' welfare) association on "refugee work" – helping political refugees escaping from Germany. By 1935/36, if not earlier, the Gestapo were aware of his "political work" at the border. 1935 had been the year his son had escaped from an increasingly xenophonic Soviet Union to be arrested by the Gestapo on his return to Germany and sentenced by the special peoples' court in Berlin to a five year jail term.

During the later 1930s there was a widespread belief that war would soon return to Europe, but many in the Netherlands (including the government) believed that it would be possible for that country to remain neutral, as it had in the First World War. This was not to be. German armies over-ran the country in May 1940. With the Netherlands under German occupation it was possible for the political opponents of National Socialism to experience the same levels Gestapo of surveillance and control as in Germany itself. Johann Geusendam was arrested by the Gestapo in October 1940 and deported to Münster, a city near the Dutch border, but on the German side of it. Over the next five years he enjoyed an inside seat in respect of the horrors of Germany's National Socialist justice system. He remained in protective custody in Münster till 1942.

Geusendam faced the special peoples' court in Berlin in 1942 and was sentenced to spend more time in prison. He was held till 1944 at Brandenburg-Görden and then transported to the south of the country where he was held in Schloss (i.e. Castle) Kaltenstein, a short distance outside Stuttgart. The Schloss had been used since 1843 as a workhouse, and then, during the National Socialist years, as a gathering point for prisoners of war and as a "protective custody" establishment for people the government did not wish to have released. Internal national security had to be preserved ("... Aus Gründen der inneren Sicherheit des Staates"). It was here that he died on 6 April 1945, a victim of physical mistreatment and malnutrition, and a day before the establishment was liberated by French troops.
