= Sallandse Heuvelrug National Park =

Protected area in the Netherlands

- Nationaal Park Sallandse Heuvelrug
- IUCN category II (national park)
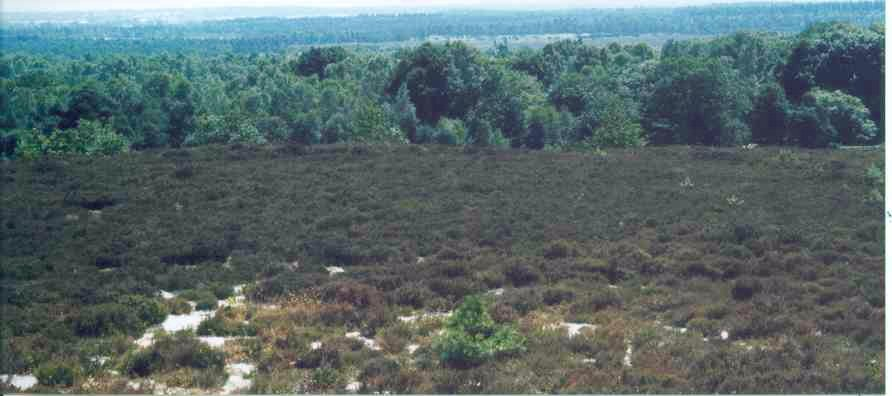
- Panorama of the Ridge of Salland

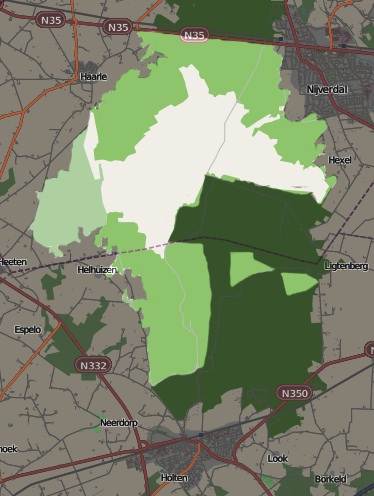
- Map of the National Park
- Location: Overijssel, Netherlands
- Nearest city: Nijverdal, Holten
- Coordinates: 52°20′N 6°25′E
- Area: 35 km^{2} (14 sq mi)
- Established: 2004
- Governing body: Staatsbosbeheer, Natuurmonumenten
- Website: www.sallandseheuvelrug.nl

Sallandse Heuvelrug National Park is a national park in the Dutch province of Overijssel, located between the townships of Hellendoorn and Holten. In 2004, the Dutch Government changed the status of the area to National Park. The park is mainly managed by Staatsbosbeheer, Natuurmonumenten and the water company Vitens. In addition, several small private owners are involved in the management, as well as regional communities and stakeholders.

The National Park is located in its entirety south of the N35 (Zwolle-Almelo), and encapsulates Haarlerberg, Holterberg, Noetselerberg and Koningsbelten. The park covers an area of approximately 35 square kilometres. Its highest point is the Koningsbelt, standing 75 metres above Normaal Amsterdams Peil (NAP).

== Landscape and history ==
The Sallandse heuvelrug is a moraine, created in the second-last glaciation, Saalien, 150,000 years ago. During the Holocene forests started to develop, but after the growth of the human population, these forests had been cut. From the Middle Ages onwards the area was used for grazing by sheep and goats, and the upper layer of the soil was removed to use it as fertilizer for the crop fields. In this period, the area became a heathland because of sand-drifting. In the beginning of the 20th century the state started forestry programs, to prevent this erosion and to produce pine wood. The area is well known for its scenery because of its relatively large heathlands.

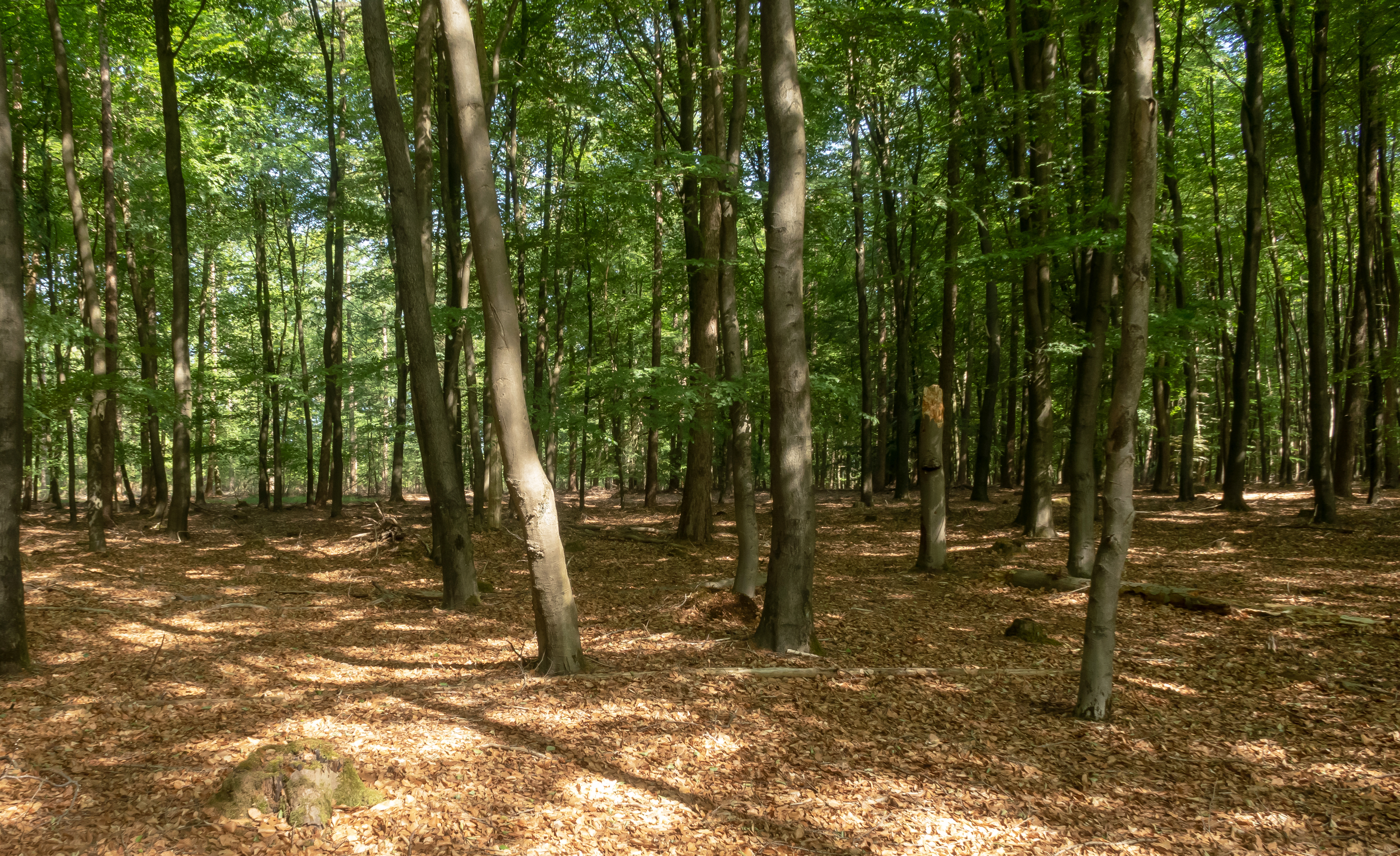
Trees at the Sallandse Heuvelrug

== Vegetation and wildlife ==
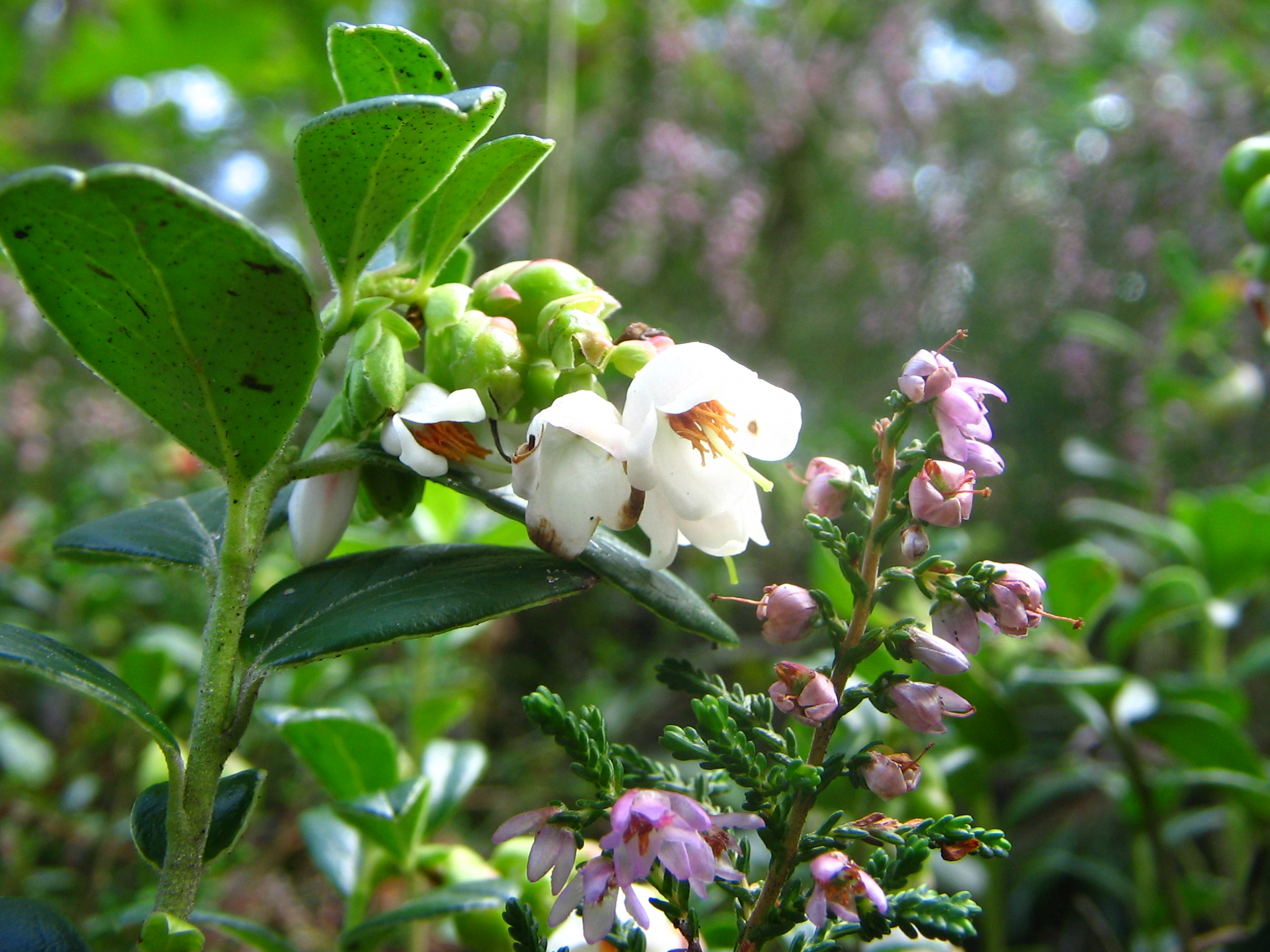
Lingonberry or cowberry (Vaccinium vitis-idaea)

Most characteristic features of the national park are the relief and the heath lands. Cranberry growths in large numbers. We also find the last Dutch population of the black grouse (Tetrao tetrix), European nightjar (Caprimulgus europaeusnightjar), and several lizard species, such as the viviparous lizard (Zootoca vivipara).

== Management ==
The management of the area encounters several serious problems. One of the problems is to keep the heath in its present condition and to prevent the growing of trees and grasses. The management organizations use sheep and cows to graze. To prevent disturbance, some parts of the park are closed for visitors and the road through the park is closed at night.

== Sightseeing ==
Located on the Holterberg is the Holten Canadian War Cemetery, one of the largest military cemeteries in the Netherlands, in which soldiers killed during World War II are buried. The Commonwealth War Graves Commission maintains the graves of the Canadian soldiers buried at this cemetery. The cemetery contains 1393 graves and is accessible to the public.

At Twilhaar (on the Nijverdalsche Berg), you'll find remnants of old civilisation, and a sheep pen, as well as the Memorial for Labour Camp Twilhaar. This memorial was revealed in Oct 2003, along the Paltheweg, Nijverdal. The memorial is dedicated to the men transported from this camp in 1942 to camp Westerbork; almost all of them were murdered at Auschwitz.

== Education and recreation ==
Within the park Staatsbosbeheer has a visitor centre, within which a public observatory is located. The visitor centre is located in the municipality of Nijverdal along the N35. The visitor centre hosts a permanent interactive exhibition on the history of the Sallandse Heuvelrug. Excursions are accessible for people with mobility impairments through the use of an electro car or horse tram. Along the two-kilometre trail located close to the visitor centre, there are numerous activities for children to participate in.

The park contains numerous bushwalking, cycling, mountain biking trails, as well as riding routes. It is an important area for long distance walking and biking and there are many campsites, restaurants, and hotels.

Near Holten is a museum for natural history, Natuurdiorama Holterberg.
