= Rijssen-Holten =

Rijssen-Holten Riesn-Hooltn (Sallands)
- Municipality
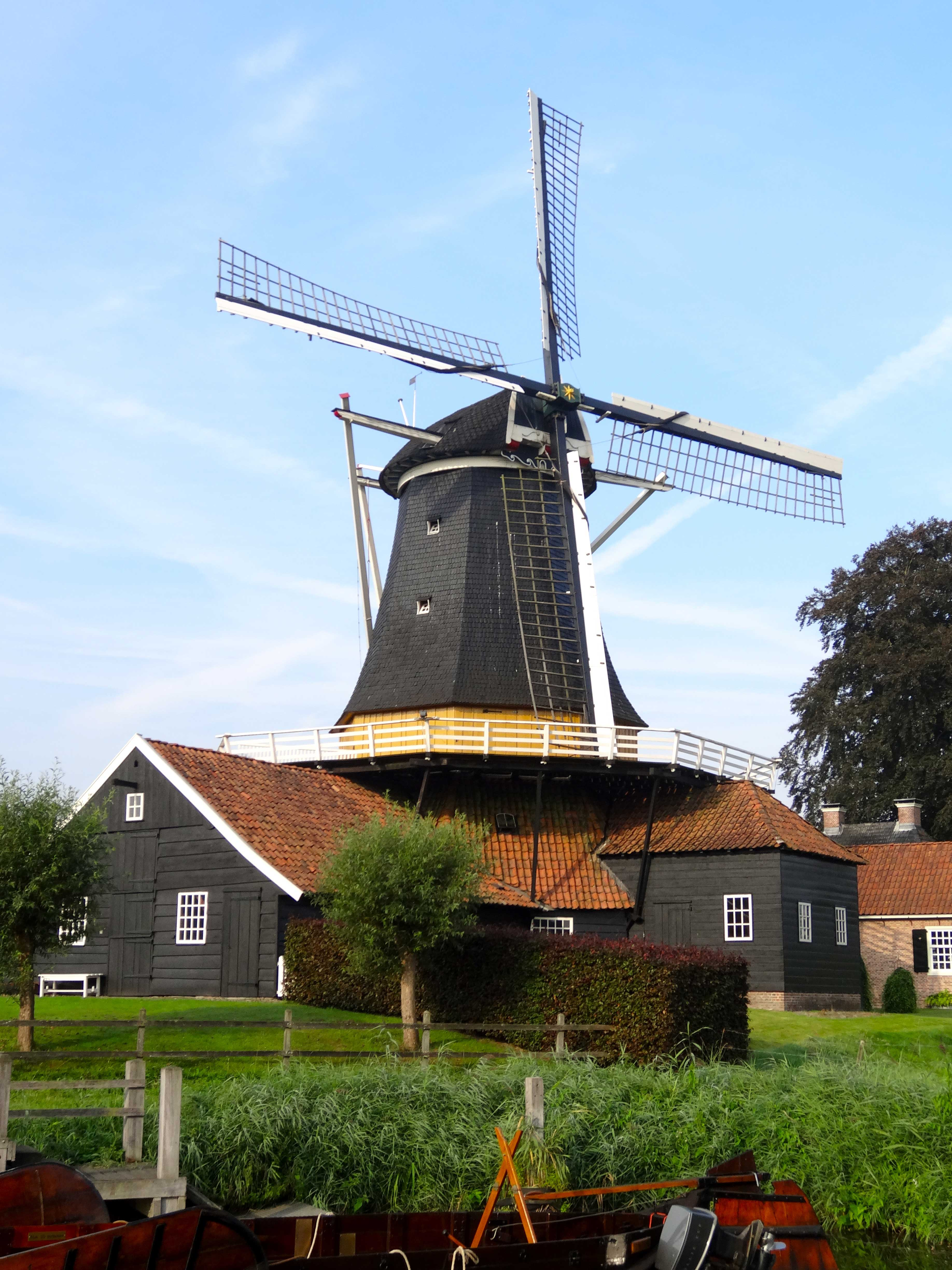
- Windmill in Rijssen

- Flag Coat of arms

- Location in Overijssel
- Coordinates: 52°18′N 6°31′E
- Country: Netherlands
- Province: Overijssel
- Established: 1 January 2001
- Renamed: 1 January 2004

Government
  - Body: Municipal council
  - Mayor: Jurgen van Houdt (Christian Union (CU))

Area
  - Total: 94.38 km^{2} (36.44 sq mi)
  - Land: 94.13 km^{2} (36.34 sq mi)
  - Water: 0.25 km^{2} (0.097 sq mi)
- Elevation: 14 m (46 ft)

Population (January 2021)
  - Total: 38,204
  - Density: 406/km^{2} (1,050/sq mi)
- Time zone: UTC+1 (CET)
  - Summer (DST): UTC+2 (CEST)
- Postcode: 7450–7463
- Area code: 0548
- Website: www.rijssen-holten.nl

Rijssen-Holten (Dutch: [ˌrɛisə(n) ˈɦɔltə(n)]; Sallaans: Riesn-Hooltn [ˌriːsn̩ ˈɦoːltn̩]) is a municipality (Dutch: gemeente) in the eastern Netherlands, in the province of Overijssel.

The municipality was formed in 2001 by the joining of the municipalities of Holten and Rijssen. The area of Holten belongs to the region of Salland and the area of Rijssen to the region of Twente.

== Population centres ==
- Beuseberg,
- De Borkeld,
- Dijkerhoek (2 km west of Holten),
- Espelo,
- Holten,
- Holterbroek,
- Lichtenberg,
- Look,
- Neerdorp (currently a part of the village Holten)
- Rijssen

Only Holten and Rijssen have over 500 inhabitants.

=== Topography ===
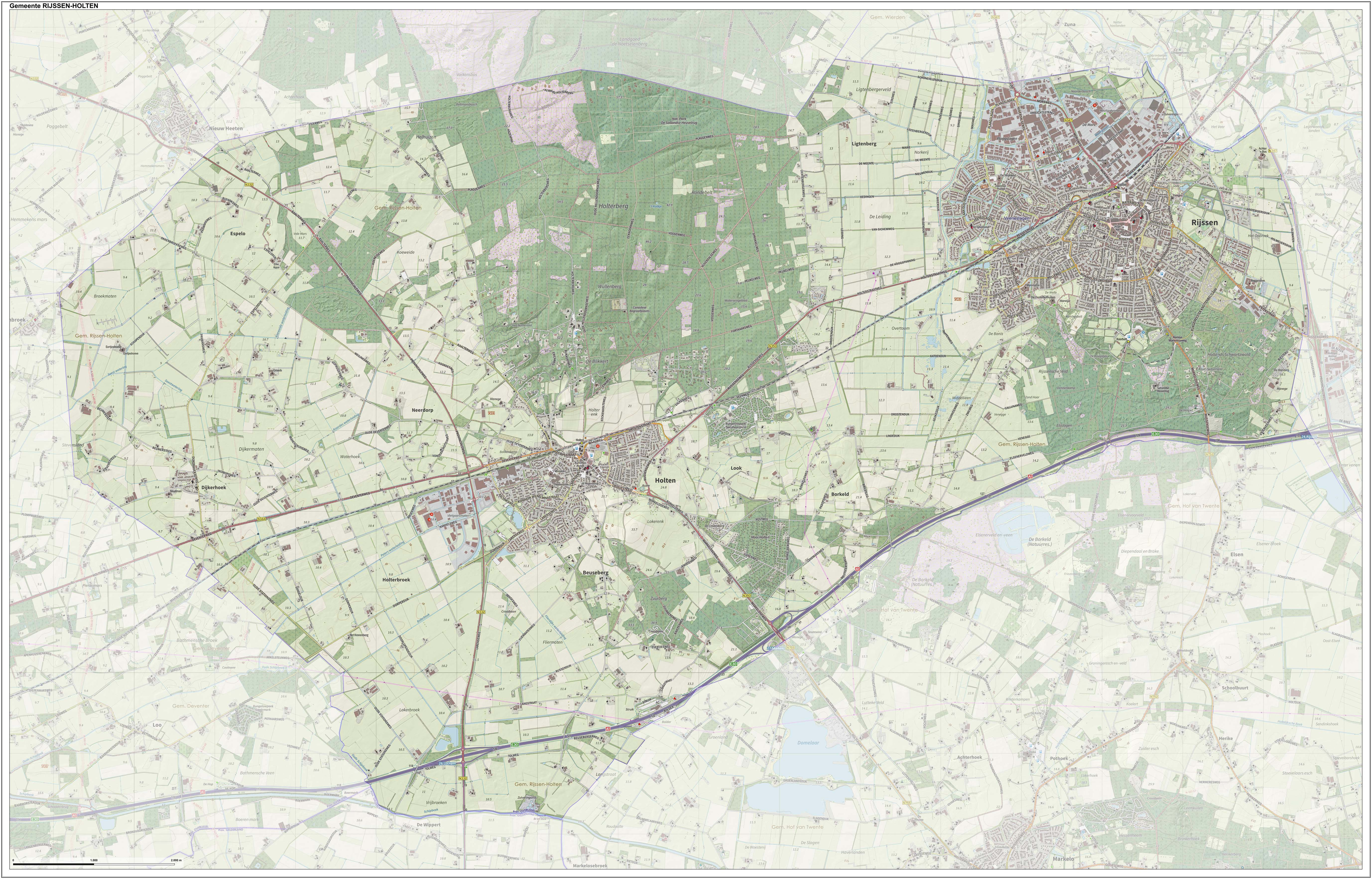

Dutch Topographic map of the municipality of Rijssen-Holten, June 2015

== Accessibility ==
Both Holten and Rijssen are easily accessible by car; the A1 motorway (Amsterdam - Berlin) is only a few kilometres away. The distance between Amsterdam and Holten is about 110 km (68 mi). Rijssen lies 7 km (4.3 mi) more to the east.

== Notable people ==
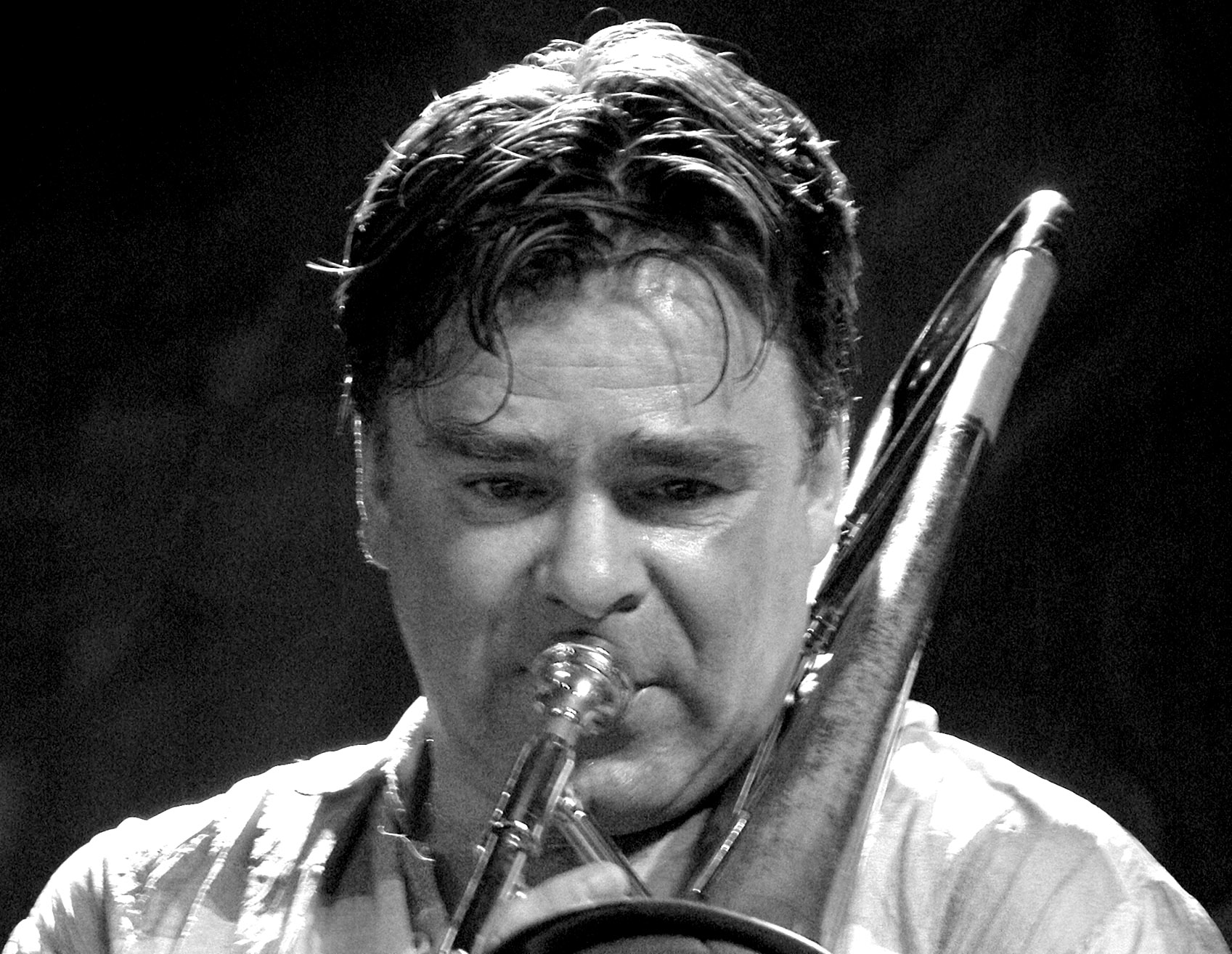
Wolter Wierbos, 2004

- Johann Geusendam (1886 in Rijssen - 1945) political activist expelled from Bremen
- Bert Haanstra (1916 in Espelo – 1997) a Dutch director of films and documentaries
- Jan Baan (born 1946 in Rijssen) a Dutch entrepreneur and venture capitalist
- Wolter Wierbos (born 1957 in Holten) a Dutch jazz trombonist

=== Sport ===
- Jan Wegereef (born 1962 in Rijssen) a Dutch & FIFA football referee
- Eric Braamhaar (born 1966 in Rijssen) a Dutch & FIFA football referee
- Mark Tuitert (born 1980 in Holten) a Dutch speed skater and gold medallist at the 2010 Winter Olympics

== Gallery ==
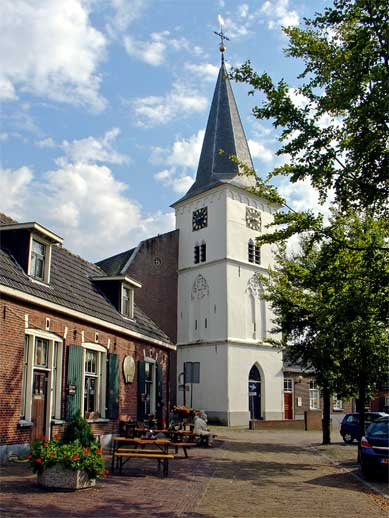
Holten, kerk

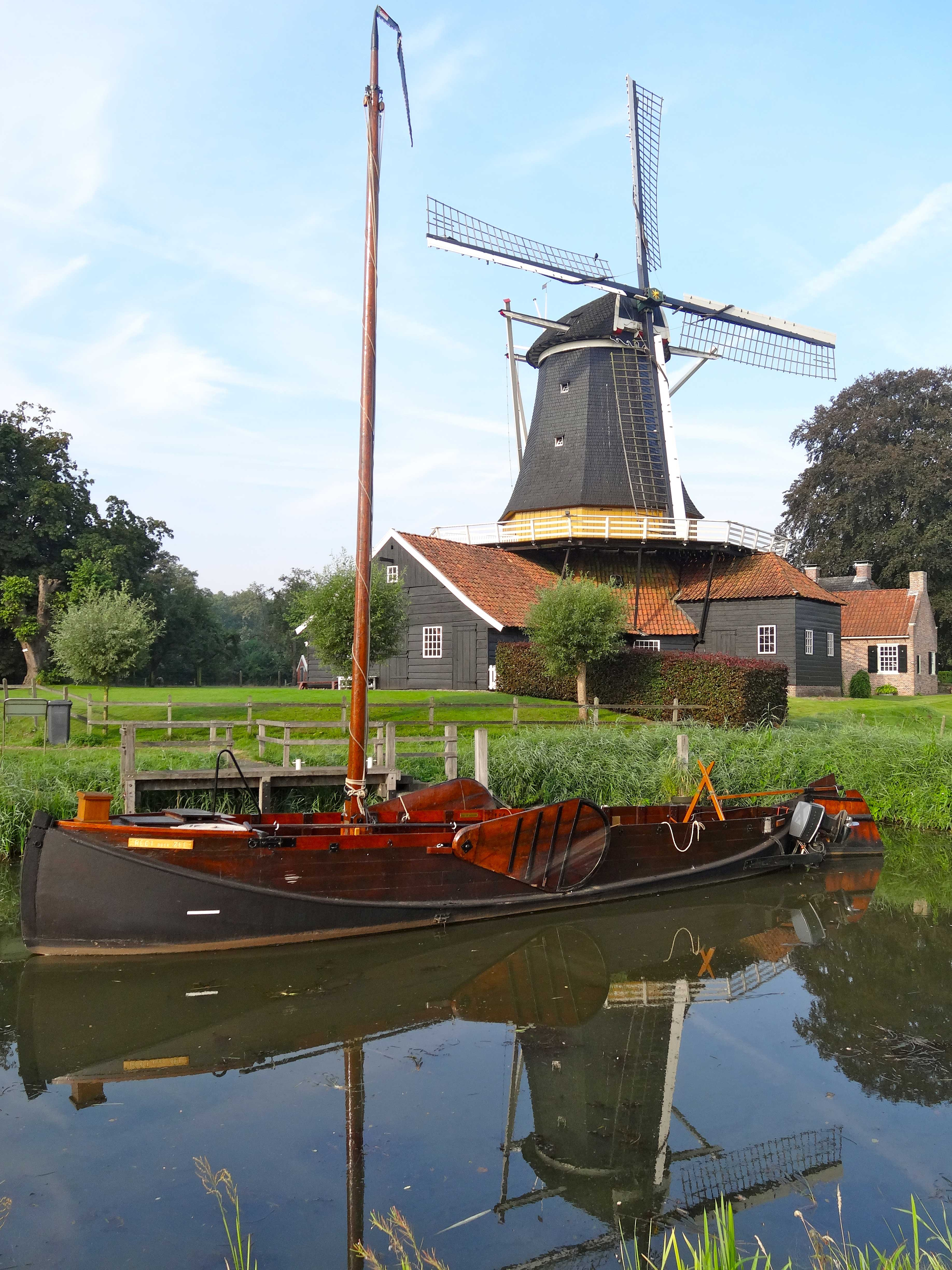
Pelmolen Ter Horst en Enterse zomp Rijssen

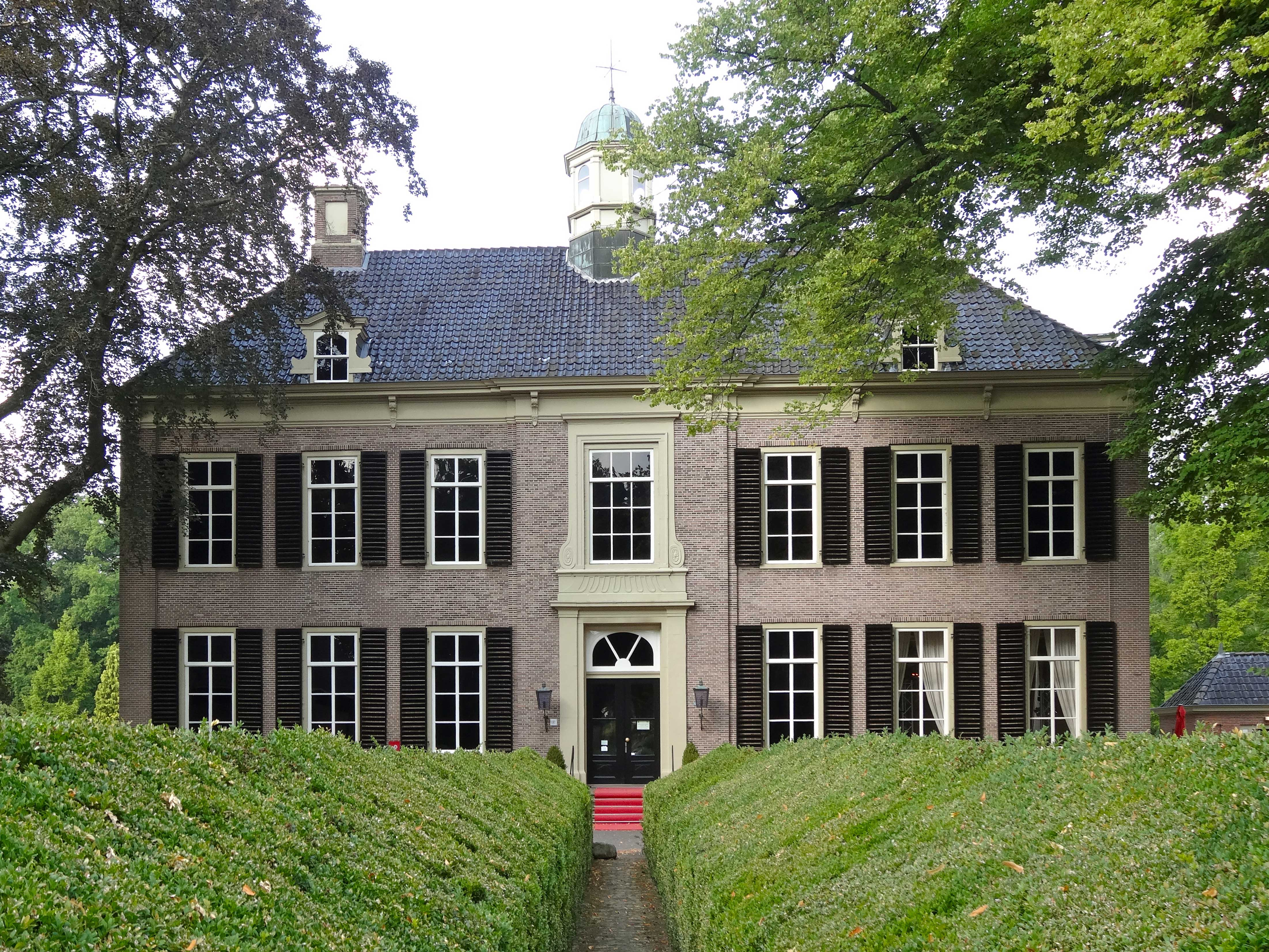
Oosterhof, Rijssen

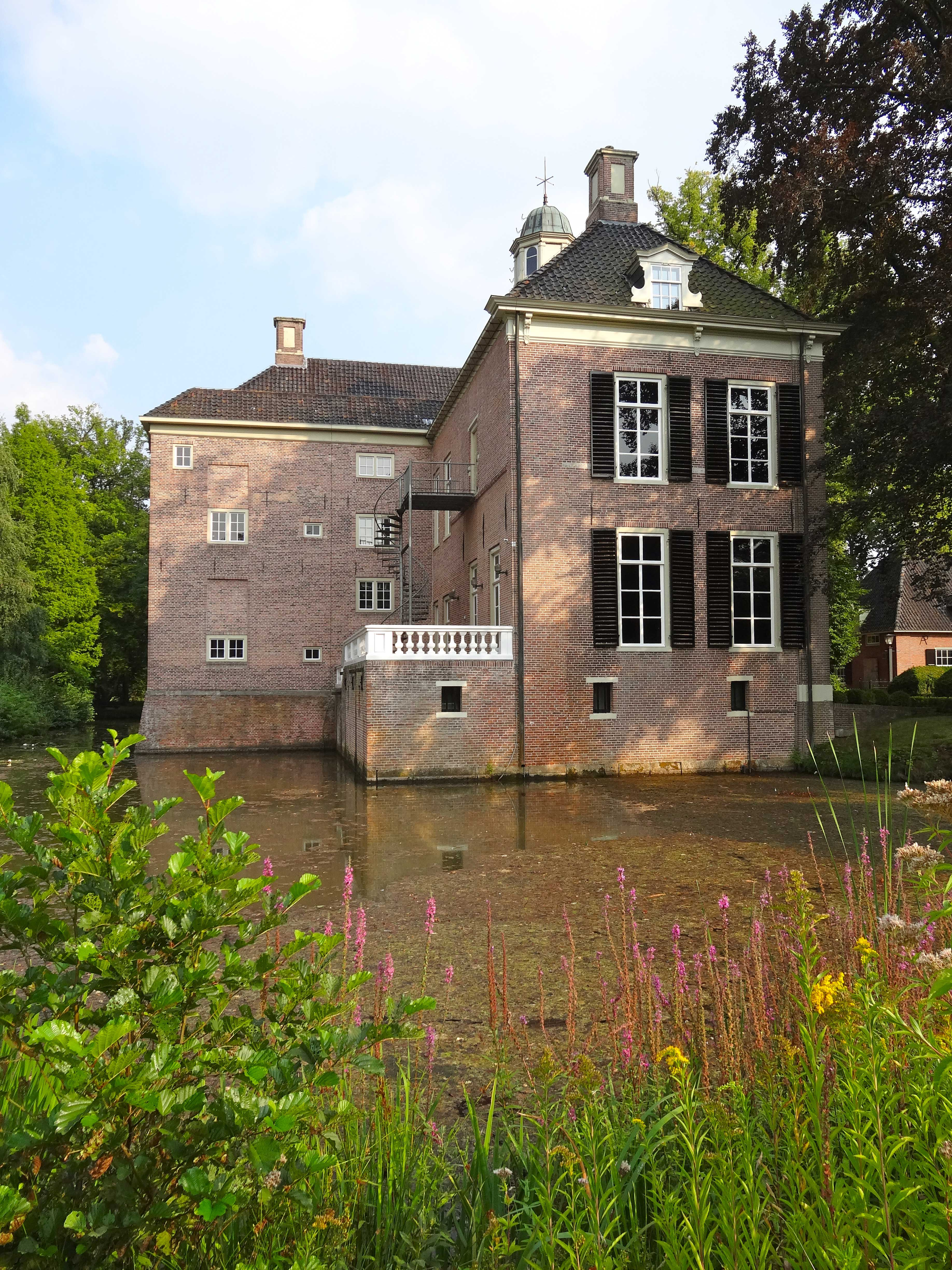
Oosterhof, Rijssen

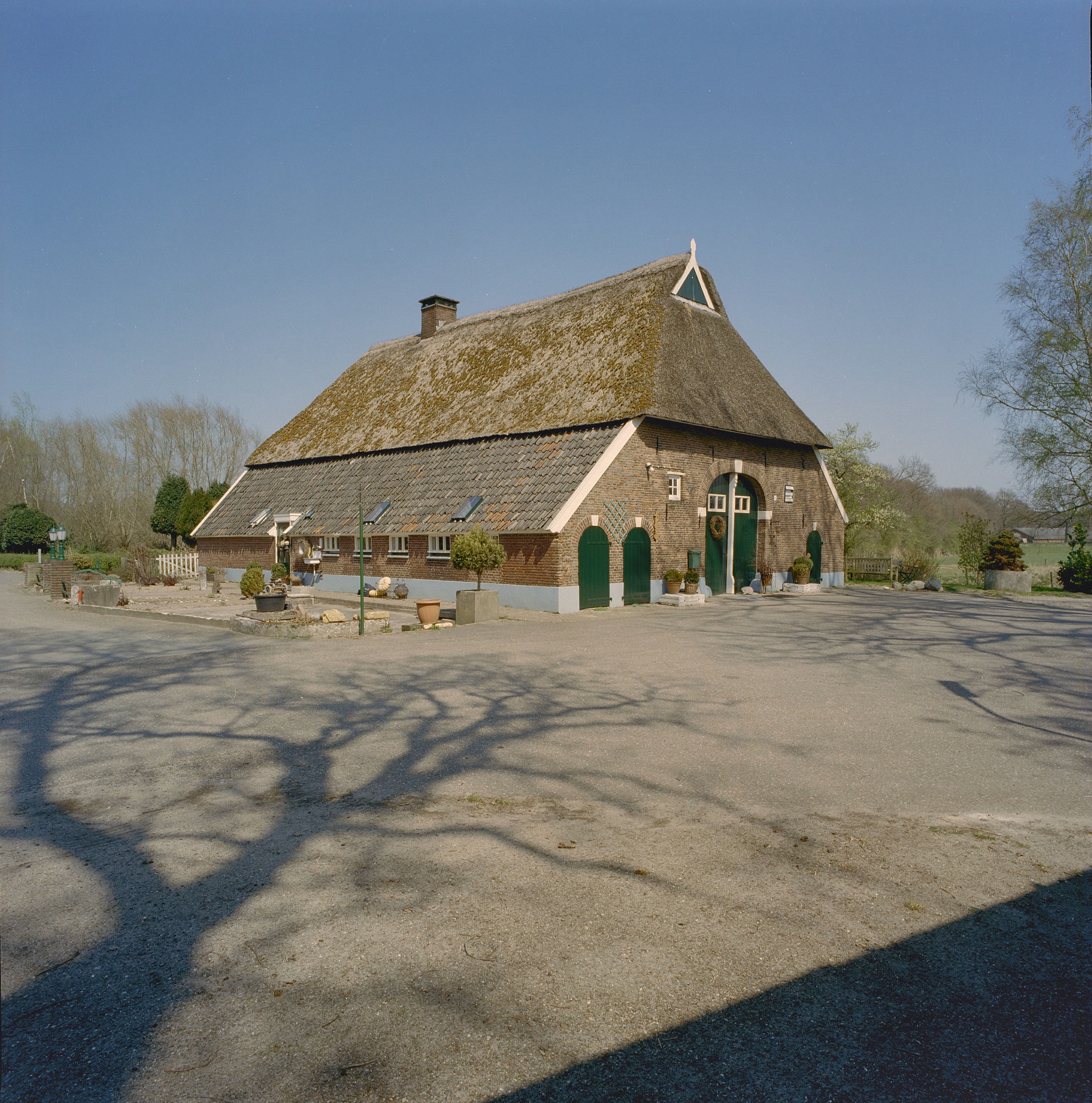
Overzicht rechter zijgevel en achtergevel - Rijssen
