= Nijverdal =

- Town
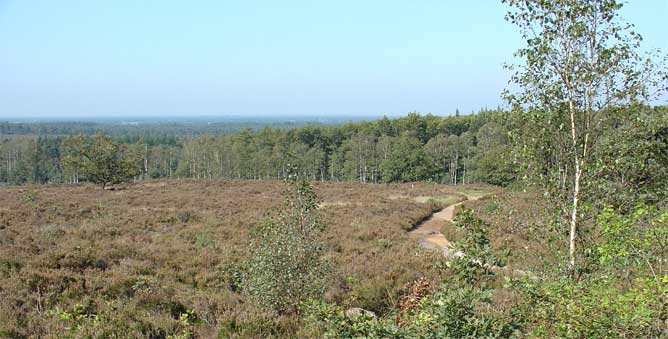
- Sallandse Heuvelrug National Park near Nijverdal

- Coat of arms

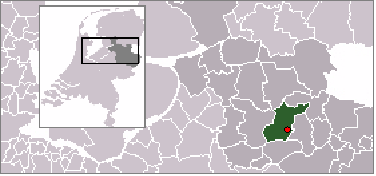
- Location in Hellendoorn, Overijssel, Netherlands

- Location in the province of Overijssel in the Netherlands Nijverdal (Netherlands)
- Coordinates: 52°22′N 6°28′E
- Country: Netherlands
- Province: Overijssel
- Municipality: Hellendoorn

Area
  - Total: 8.03 km^{2} (3.10 sq mi)
- Elevation: 11 m (36 ft)

Population (2026)
  - Total: 26.681
  - Density: 3.32/km^{2} (8.61/sq mi)
- Time zone: UTC+1 (CET)
  - Summer (DST): UTC+2 (CEST)
- Postal code: 7441-7443
- Dialing code: 0548

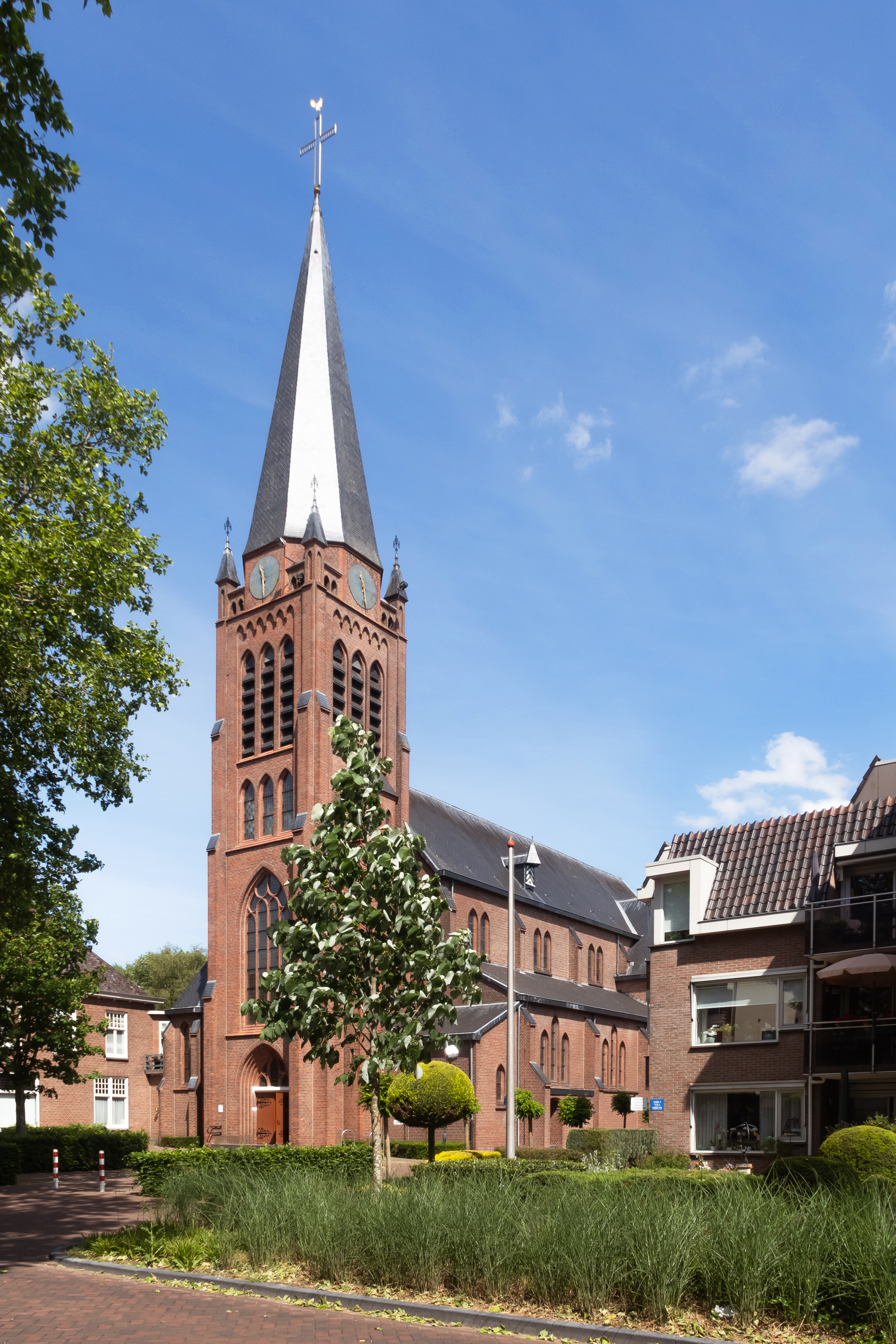
Nijverdal, Roman Catholic church

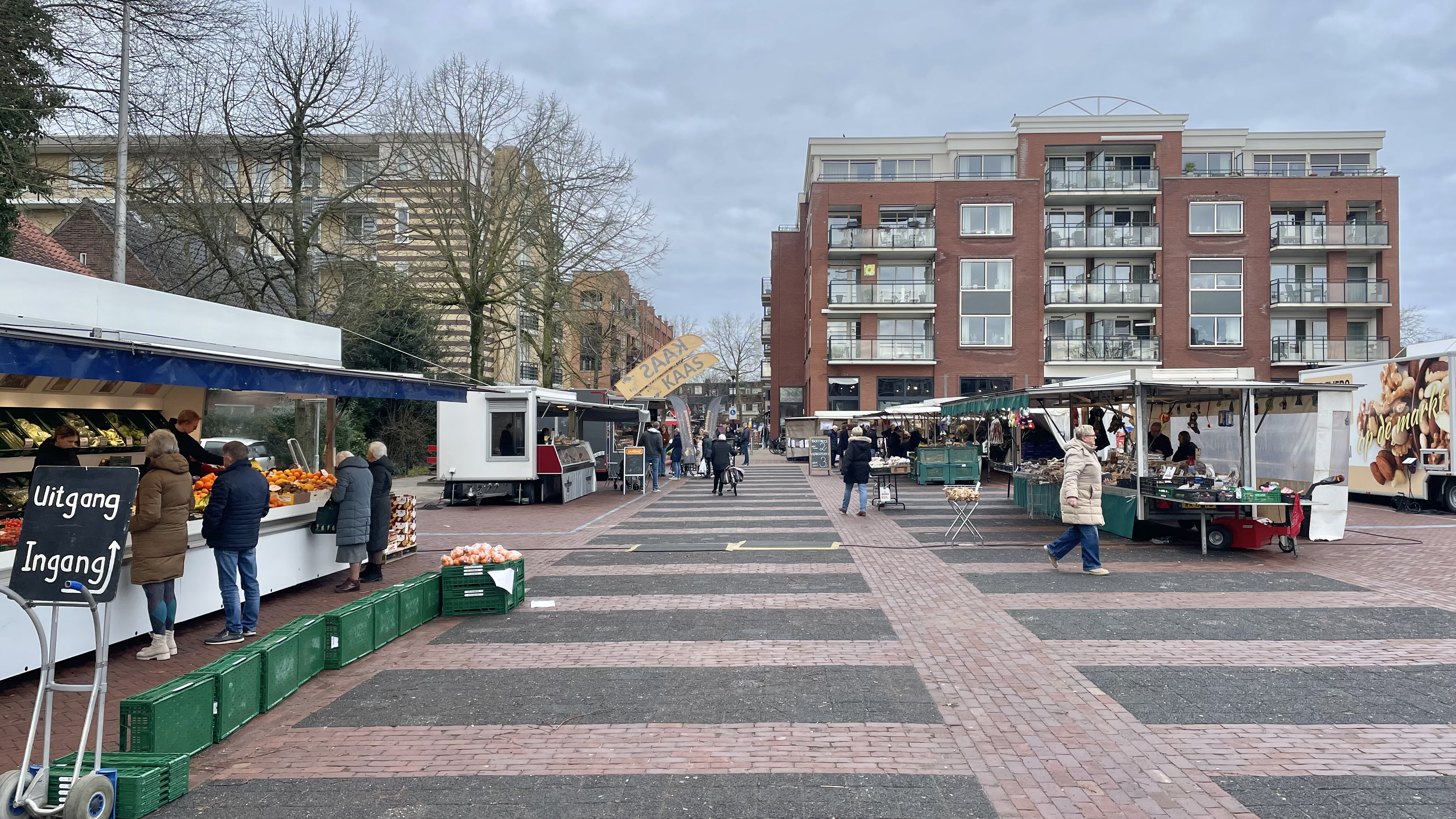
Weekly market on Saturdays

Nijverdal (Dutch pronunciation: [ˈnɛivərˌdɑl]) is a town of approximately 25,000 inhabitants in the Dutch province of Overijssel. It is the commercial centre and largest town within the municipality Hellendoorn.

Nijverdal (which means Industrious Valley) was founded in 1836 on the territory of the hamlet Noetsele. It was here that the Industrial Revolution in the Netherlands took root. Englishman Thomas Ainsworth (1795–1841) was one of its founding fathers. Textile production was the focus of industrial activity in Nijverdal, as it was for the rest of the Twente region. Some of the traditional factory buildings in the Art Deco or Jugendstil style still remain.

A river called the Regge runs through the town, and is the historical border between the two regions Twente and Salland, and the border of two Dutch dialects, which are Twents and Sallaands, respectively. Every native inhabitant of Nijverdal used to speak either one or both regional dialects but since the 1970s, the dialect is in decline. Very few inhabitants younger than 30 use any dialect anymore.

== History ==
Before World War II, Nijverdal had a small Jewish community. The municipal seat of the area, Hellendoorn, had a small synagogue and Jewish cemetery. The synagogue still exists as a storage shed behind one of the houses in the village, and the cemetery is no longer in use. It has about 20 graves, most from the nineteenth century and early 20th century. The municipality maintains the cemetery and protects it from vandalism.

The Jewish community was essentially erased by the Holocaust. Most of its members were murdered in Sobibor or Auschwitz.

On 22 March 1945, Nijverdal was severely bombed by American bombers who were originally targeting the German town of Groß Reken, but due to a shortage of fuel, the commander decided to change the target to a different strategic location. This location was the Zwolle-Almelo railway passing through Nijverdal. Over 73 people were killed, mainly at the Grotestraat and Rijssensestraat. Many people were out shopping and gardening that day due to the sunny weather conditions.

In 1955, part of the municipality of Wierden was annexed (Eversberg, Konijnenbelt, Slettenhaar and Lochter) which is the only part of the municipality located on originally Twente soil. In the late 70's the quarter of 'Groot Lochter' arose here.

== Transport ==
- Railway station: Nijverdal

Since 31 March 2013, Nijverdal has a new railway station, due to major improvements to the railway connection between Zwolle and Enschede. This new station is part of the building of the Salland-Twente tunnel, a new 'combination'-tunnel connection which leads the traffic of the N35 and the trains underneath Nijverdal. Before this new station was established the railway connection stopped at the old train station and continued at a temporary station Nijverdal West. During this time one pedestrian/bike bridge and one small tunnel connected the north side to the south side of the town.

== Sports ==
Nijverdal has a Water polo club, named Het Ravijn, of which both men and women teams play in the Dutch Premier League. Some women in the women's team play for the Dutch team, which won gold at the 2008 Summer Olympics.

There is a large number of sports clubs in Nijverdal:

- Swimming/Water polo - Swimming and Water Polo Club Het Ravijn, of which both men and women teams play in the Dutch Water Polo Premier League, one of the world's largest Water polo competitions.
- Athletics - AV Atletics
- Badminton - B.C. Reflex Nijverdal
- Basketball - The Valley Bucketeers
- Bridge - Bridgeclub Reggedal
- Darts - Eversberg Darts
- Hockey - Hockeyclub Hellendoorn/Nijverdal H.C.H.N.
- Gymnastics - Gymnastics Club Fysion Nijverdal
- Korfball - NKC'51
- Shooting sports - L.S.V.N Nijverdal (air guns)
- Shooting sports - S.V. Willem Tell (firearms)
- (Table)tennis - Tennis Club Nijverdal - Table tennis Club Match Point `68
- Soccer - VV DES; S.V. ENC '09; Hulzense Boys; RKSV De Zweef; S.V.V.N.
- Volleyball - Volleyball Club Flash Nijverdal; Volleyball Club V.E.C.
- Bicycle racing - Cycling Club CC'75; Cyclo-cross Club De Lochsprinters
