= Best railway station =

Railway station in the Netherlands

Best
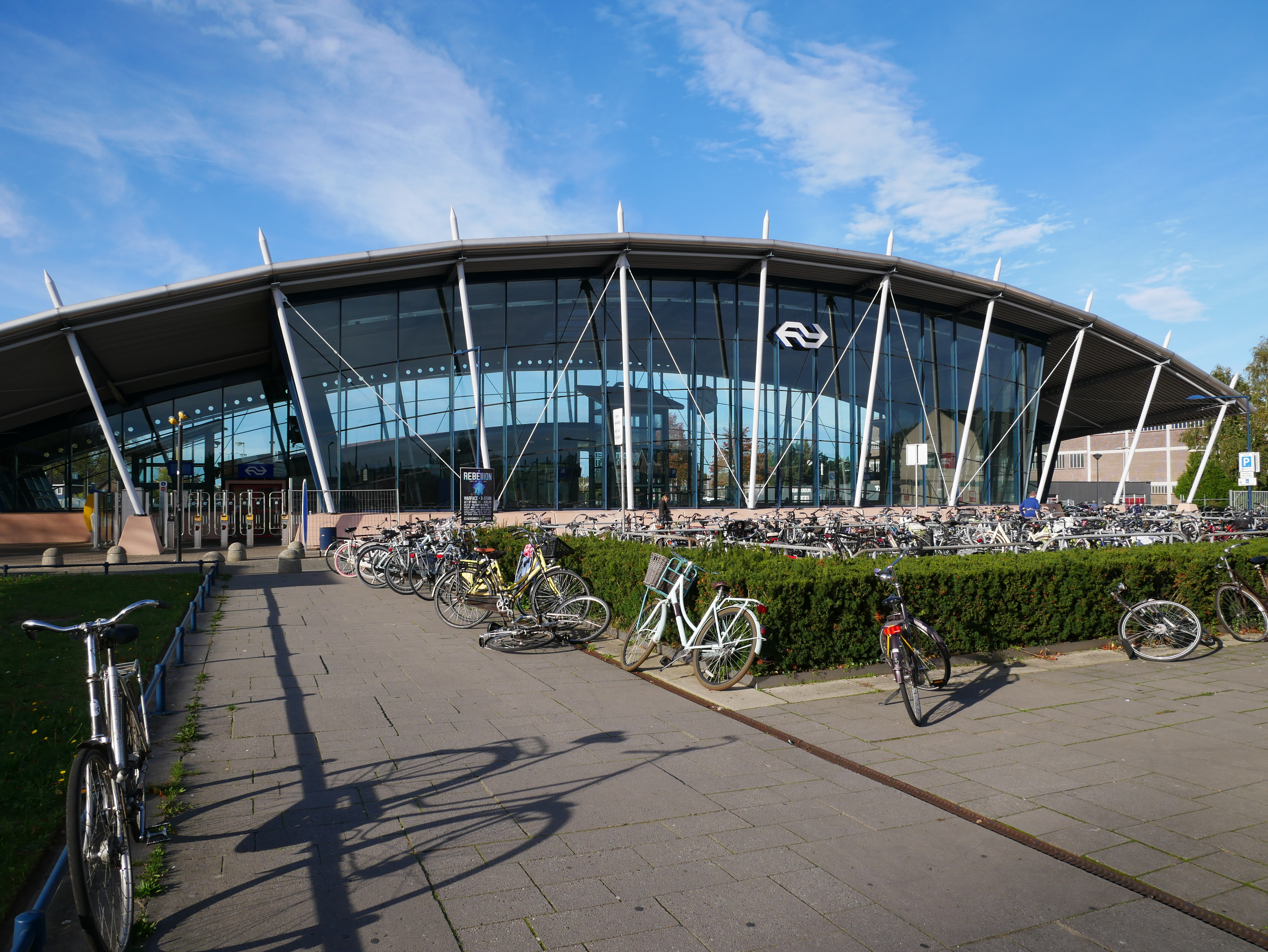
- Best railway station, 2019

General information
- Location: Netherlands
- Coordinates: 51°30′35″N 5°23′20″E
- Line: Breda–Eindhoven railway

Construction
- Structure type: Underground

History
- Opened: 1866

Services
Preceding station	Nederlandse Spoorwegen	Following station
Boxtel towards 's-Hertogenbosch	NS Sprinter 4400 Except AM Peak	Eindhoven Strijp-S towards Deurne
Boxtel towards Oss	NS Sprinter 4400 AM Peak	Eindhoven Strijp-S towards Deurne
Boxtel towards Tilburg Universiteit	NS Sprinter 6400	Eindhoven Strijp-S towards Weert
Location
- Location within Netherlands

Best is a railway station located in Best, Netherlands.

The station is located on the Breda–Maastricht railway (State Line E) between Tilburg and Eindhoven. The station is operated by Nederlandse Spoorwegen. The station is located in a tunnel and has four platforms.

== History ==
The station was opened on 1 July 1866. It closed on 15 May 1938 and re-opened on 10 June 1940. There have been several different station buildings over the years. The most recent building was finished in 2000, as part of the construction of two extra tracks between Eindhoven and Boxtel, bringing the total to four.

== Train services ==
The station is served by the following service(s):

- 2x per hour local services (Sprinter) Tilburg Universiteit - Eindhoven
- 2x per hour local services (Sprinter) 's-Hertogenbosch - Eindhoven - Deurne
