= Eindhoven Strijp-S railway station =

Railway station in the Netherlands

Eindhoven Strijp-S
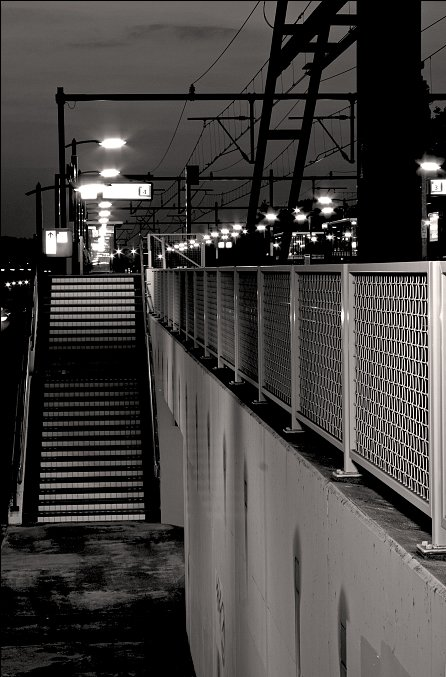

General information
- Location: Netherlands
- Coordinates: 51°27′02″N 5°27′24″E
- Line: Breda–Eindhoven railway
- Platforms: 4

History
- Opened: 1971

Services
| Preceding station | Nederlandse Spoorwegen | Following station |
|---|---|---|
| Best towards 's-Hertogenbosch | NS Sprinter 4400 Except AM Peak | Eindhoven Centraal towards Deurne |
| Best towards Oss | NS Sprinter 4400 AM Peak | Eindhoven Centraal towards Deurne |
| Best towards Tilburg Universiteit | NS Sprinter 6400 | Eindhoven Centraal towards Weert |
Location
- Location within Netherlands

Eindhoven Strijp-S is a railway station located in northwestern Eindhoven, Netherlands at the Strijp-S creative and residential district built on the former Philips factory complex. The station was opened on 23 September 1971 and is located on the Breda–Eindhoven railway. The station is operated by Nederlandse Spoorwegen.

The station was known as Eindhoven Beukenlaan until 13 December 2015 when it was renamed Eindhoven Strijp-S. This is to reflect the redevelopment of the area around the station into a business park, called Strijp-S.

The station will undergo a major upgrade, set for completion by 2031, which will transform it into a fully accessible hub featuring three new elevators, a new ground-level passage connecting Strijp-S and Strijp-T, and an expanded bicycle parking facility.

== Train services ==
The station is served by the following service(s):

- 2x per hour local services (stoptrein) Tilburg Universiteit - Eindhoven
- 2x per hour local services (stoptrein) 's-Hertogenbosch - Eindhoven - Deurne
