= Boxtel railway station =

Railway station in the Netherlands

Boxtel
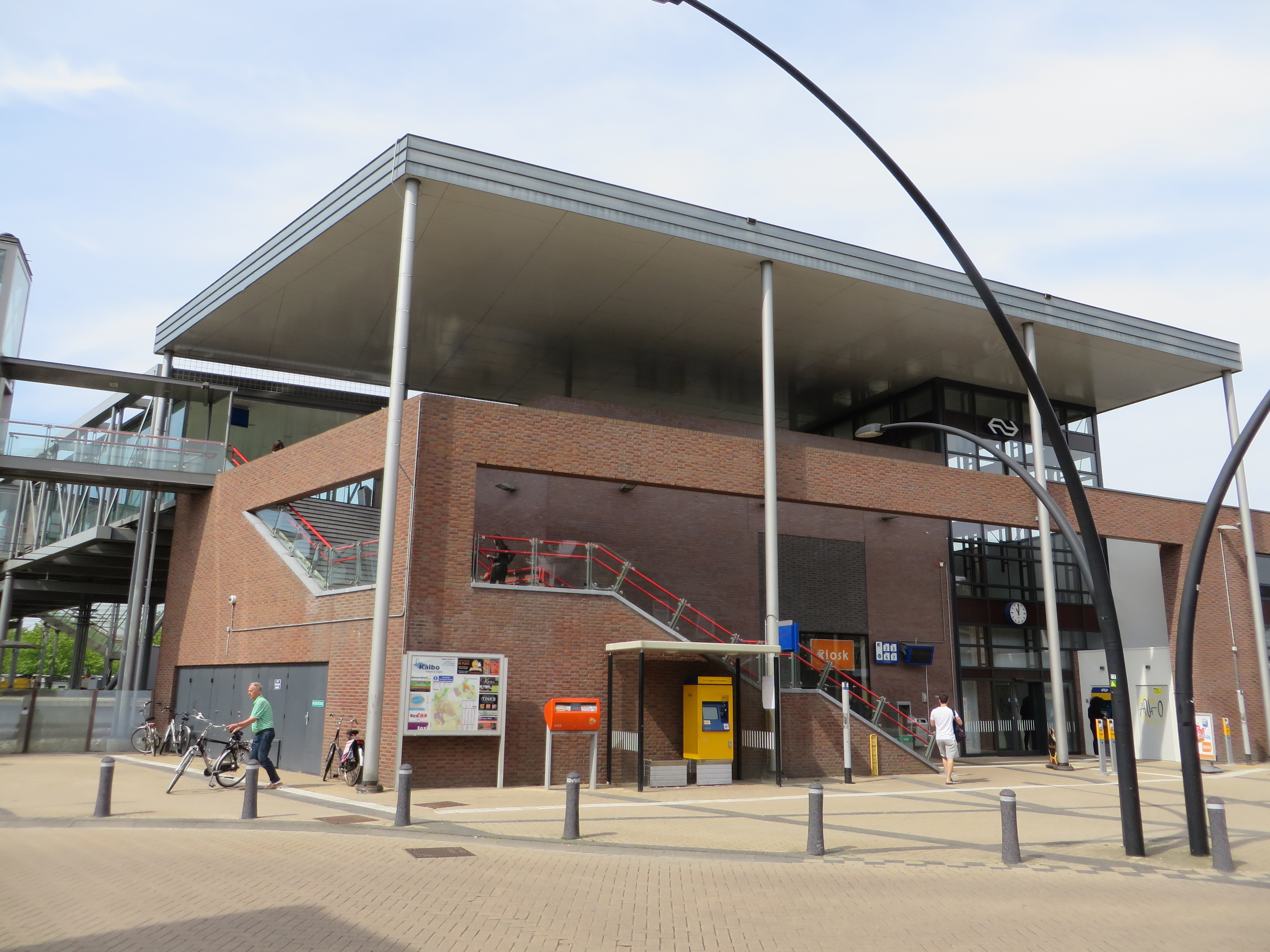

General information
- Location: Netherlands
- Coordinates: 51°35′04″N 5°19′08″E
- Lines: Breda–Eindhoven railway Utrecht–Boxtel railway
- Platforms: 4 (2 island)

History
- Opened: 1 May 1865
- Rebuilt: 29 September 2000

Services
Preceding station	Nederlandse Spoorwegen	Following station
Vught towards 's-Hertogenbosch	NS Sprinter 4400 Except AM Peak	Best towards Deurne
Vught towards Oss	NS Sprinter 4400 AM Peak	Best towards Deurne
Oisterwijk towards Tilburg Universiteit	NS Sprinter 6400	Best towards Weert
Location
- Location within Netherlands

Boxtel railway station is located in Boxtel, Netherlands. The station was opened on 1 May 1865 and is located on the Breda–Eindhoven railway (between Tilburg and Eindhoven) and the Utrecht–Boxtel railway. The station is currently operated by Nederlandse Spoorwegen. Boxtel is an interchange station for Stoptreinen (trains stopping at every station) in North Brabant. There are services meeting in 3 different directions.

The station was mostly rebuilt from 1998, opening on 29 September 2000 as part of quadrupling of the Eindhoven to Boxtel line with a second island platform added.

The station lies at the start of the former Boxtel–Wesel railway.

== Destinations ==
These are some of the destinations that are possible to reach from Boxtel:

Tilburg, Eindhoven, Helmond, Deurne and 's-Hertogenbosch.

The nearest major stations where all trains stop are:

- Eindhoven railway station - for services to the south and east
- 's-Hertogenbosch railway station - for services to the north and east
- Tilburg railway station - for services to the west and north

== Train services ==
The following services currently call at Boxtel:

- 2x per hour local services (stoptrein) Tilburg Universiteit - Eindhoven
- 2x per hour local services (stoptrein) 's-Hertogenbosch - Eindhoven - Deurne

== Bus services ==
- 203 - 's-Hertogenbosch - Boxtel - Liempde
- 204 - Best - Sint Oedenrode - Boxtel - Schijndel
- 299 - Oirschot - Boxtel - Sint Michielsgestel
