= Oisterwijk railway station =

Railway station in the Netherlands

Oisterwijk
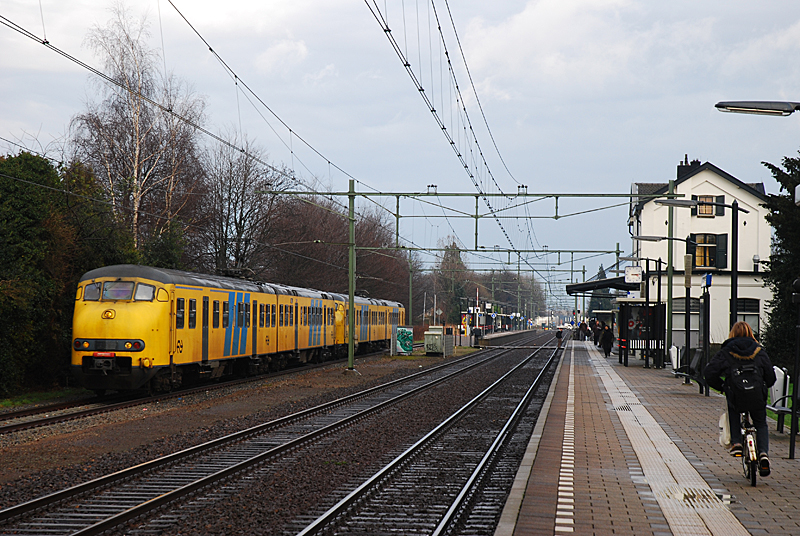
- A Mat' 64 set leaving Oisterwijk in 2008

General information
- Location: Netherlands
- Coordinates: 51°34′56″N 5°11′40″E
- Line: Breda–Eindhoven railway

History
- Opened: 1 May 1865

Services
Preceding station	Nederlandse Spoorwegen	Following station
Tilburg towards Tilburg Universiteit	NS Sprinter 6400	Boxtel towards Weert
Location
- Location within Netherlands

Oisterwijk is a railway station located in the centre of Oisterwijk, Netherlands. The station was opened on 1 May 1865 and is located on the Breda–Eindhoven railway between Tilburg and Eindhoven. The train services are operated by Nederlandse Spoorwegen.

== Train services ==
The following services currently call at Oisterwijk:

- 2x per hour local services (stoptrein) Tilburg Universiteit - Weert

== Bus services ==
There is a bus stop outside the station called Station NS.

Services 205 and 289 call at this station, as well as service 140 from and to 's-Hertogenbosch and Tilburg.
