= Eindhoven Centraal railway station =

Netherlands railway station

Eindhoven Centraal
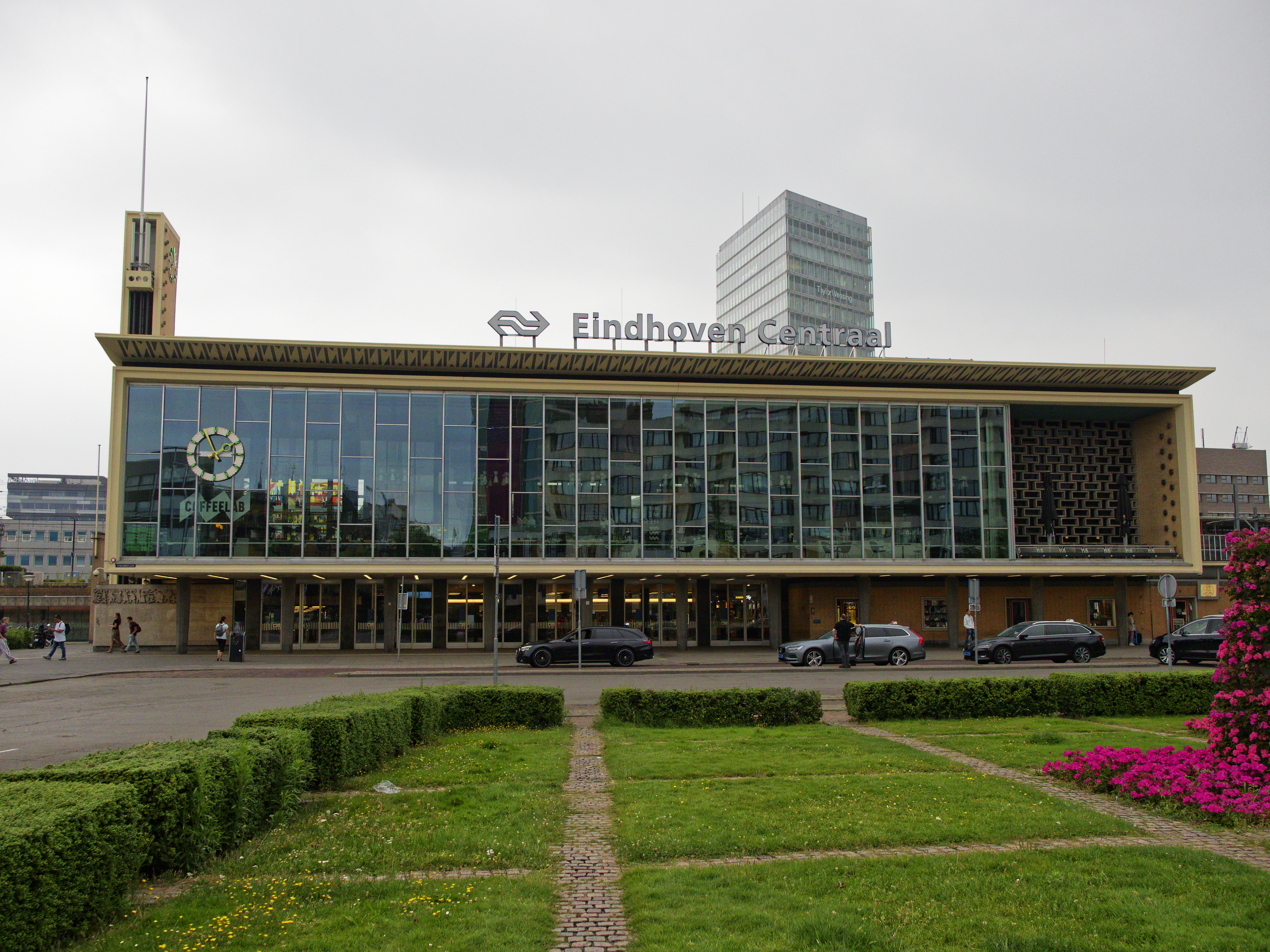

General information
- Location: Eindhoven, North Brabant, Netherlands
- Coordinates: 51°26′34″N 5°28′49″E
- Lines: Breda–Eindhoven railway Venlo–Eindhoven railway Eindhoven–Weert railway

History
- Opened: 1 July 1864; 162 years ago

Services
| Preceding station | ÖBB | Following station |
|---|---|---|
| Utrecht Centraal towards Amsterdam Centraal | Nightjet | Köln Hbf towards Zürich HB |
| Preceding station | Nederlandse Spoorwegen | Following station |
| Tilburg towards Den Haag Centraal | NS Intercity 1100 | Terminus |
| 's-Hertogenbosch towards Alkmaar | NS Intercity 2700 Mon-Thur until 19:00 | Weert towards Maastricht |
| 's-Hertogenbosch towards Enkhuizen | NS Intercity 2900 After 19:00 and Fri-Sun only | Weert towards Maastricht |
| 's-Hertogenbosch towards Dordrecht | NS Intercity 3500 | Helmond towards Venlo |
| 's-Hertogenbosch towards Enkhuizen | NS Intercity 3900 Mon-Thur until 19:30 | Weert towards Heerlen |
| Terminus | NS Intercity 3900 After 19:30 and Fri-Sun | Weert towards Heerlen |
| 's-Hertogenbosch towards Utrecht Centraal | NS Nachtnet 21400 Fri/Sat nights only | Terminus |
| Tilburg towards Rotterdam Centraal | NS Nachtnet 21410 Fri/Sat night only | Terminus |
| Eindhoven Strijp-S towards 's-Hertogenbosch | NS Sprinter 4400 Except AM Peak | Helmond Brandevoort towards Deurne |
| Eindhoven Strijp-S towards Oss | NS Sprinter 4400 AM Peak | Helmond Brandevoort towards Deurne |
| Eindhoven Strijp-S towards Tilburg Universiteit | NS Sprinter 6400 | Geldrop towards Weert |
| Terminus | NS Sprinter 16400 | Geldrop towards Weert |
| Preceding station | Arriva Netherlands | Following station |
| 's-Hertogenbosch towards Schiphol Airport | Nachttrein 32710 Friday night only | Weert towards Maastricht |
Location
- Location within Netherlands

Eindhoven Centraal railway station is the main railway station in Eindhoven in North Brabant, Netherlands. It is the busiest station outside the Randstad area and an important station in the southern part of The Netherlands.

== History ==
The station was opened on 1 July 1864 and is located on the Breda–Eindhoven railway, the Venlo–Eindhoven railway and the Eindhoven–Weert railway. The station is operated by Nederlandse Spoorwegen.

The station is 900m east of the Philips Stadion, which is served by Eindhoven Stadion railway station in the event of football matches or other special events at the stadium.

== Train services ==
Eindhoven Centraal is a major interchange station for train services in the southern Netherlands. The station is served by the following service(s):

- 2x per hour Intercity services (Schagen -) Alkmaar - Amsterdam - Utrecht - Eindhoven - Sittard - Maastricht
- 2x per hour Intercity services The Hague - Breda - Eindhoven
- 2x per hour Intercity services Schiphol - Utrecht - Eindhoven - Venlo
- 2x per hour Intercity services Enkhuizen - Amsterdam - Utrecht - Eindhoven - Heerlen
- 1x per hour night train (nachtnet) service Rotterdam - Breda - Eindhoven (weekends only)
- 1x per hour night train (nachtnet) service Utrecht - 's-Hertogenbosch - Eindhoven (weekends only)
- 2x per hour local services (sprinter) Tilburg Universiteit - Eindhoven
- 2x per hour local services (sprinter) 's-Hertogenbosch - Eindhoven - Deurne
- 2x per hour local services (sprinter) Eindhoven - Weert

== Bus services ==
Eindhoven Centraal railway station is served by bus station Neckerspoel, on the north side, with the following city bus lines (there are also 30 regional bus lines):

=== Stadsbussen ===
| Line | Route | Notes |
|---|---|---|
| 2 | Eindhoven NS - Blixembosch-Oost | |
| 3 | Eindhoven NS - Blixembosch-West | |
| 4 | Eindhoven NS - Heesterakker | |
| 5 | Eindhoven NS - 't Hofke (via Rembrandtplein) | |
| 6 | Eindhoven NS - Nuenen-Oost | |
| 7 | Eindhoven NS - Veldhoven-Maxima Medisch Centrum (via Aalst and Waalre) | |
| 8 | Eindhoven NS - Kapelbeemd (via Acht) | Evenings and weekends only between Acht and Eindhoven |
| 9 | Eindhoven NS - Best NS | |
| 10 | Eindhoven NS - Oirschot (via De Schakel) | |
| 11 | Eindhoven NS - Weert NS (via Maarheeze) | |
| 12 | Eindhoven NS - Gijzenrooi | |
| 14 | Eindhoven NS - Veldhoven-Centrum | |
| 15 | Eindhoven NS - Veldhoven-Centrum | |
| 16 | Eindhoven NS - Veldhoven-Maxima Medisch Centrum | |
| 17 | Eindhoven NS - Roosten | |
| 18 | Eindhoven NS - Bergeijk-Loo | |
| 19 | Eindhoven NS - Bladel (via Hapert) | |
| 24 | Eindhoven NS - Helmond NS (via Mierlo) | |
| 114 | Eindhoven NS - De Hurk | Only operates during rush hour |
| 119 | Eindhoven NS - Veldhoven-ASML | Only operates during rush hour |
| 154 | Eindhoven NS - Den Bosch NS (via Schijndel) | Only operates during rush hour Operated by Arriva |
| 156 | Eindhoven NS - Den Bosch NS (via Den Dungen) | Only operates during rush hour Operated by Arriva |
| 157 | Eindhoven NS - Oss NS | Only operates during rush hour Operated by Arriva |
| 305 | Eindhoven NS - Oss NS | Operated by Arriva |
| 317 | Eindhoven NS - Dommelen | |
| 318 | Eindhoven NS - Luyksgestel (via Valkenswaard) | |
| 319 | Eindhoven NS - Reusel-Busstation | |
| 320 | Eindhoven NS - Helmond NS (via Someren) | |
| 321 | Eindhoven NS - Gemert-Slenk | |
| 322 | Eindhoven NS - Uden-Busstation | |
| 324 | Eindhoven NS - Geldrop-Coevering | |
| 400 | Eindhoven NS - Airport (Shuttle) | BravoDirect line (BRT line) |
| 401 | Eindhoven NS - Airport (via Meerhoven) | BravoDirect line (BRT line) |
| 402 | Eindhoven NS - Veldhoven-Zonderwick | BravoDirect line (BRT line) |
| 403 | Eindhoven NS - Oerle | BravoDirect line (BRT line) |
| 404 | Eindhoven NS - Nuenen-Centrum | BravoDirect line (BRT line) |
| 405 | Eindhoven NS - Achtse Barrier | BravoDirect line (BRT line) |
| 406 | Eindhoven NS - Ekkersrijt | BravoDirect line (BRT line) |
| 407 | Eindhoven NS - High Tech Campus | BravoDirect line (BRT line) |
| 408 | Eindhoven NS - High Tech Campus | BravoDirect line (BRT line) |
| 603 | Eindhoven NS - Fontys Fliednerstraat | School bus (Only operates during morning rush hour) |
| 605 | Eindhoven NS - Uden-Hobostraat | School bus (Only operates during morning rush hour); Only arrival, no departure |
| 610 | Eindhoven NS - Internationale School | School bus (Only operates during morning rush hour) |

== Gallery ==
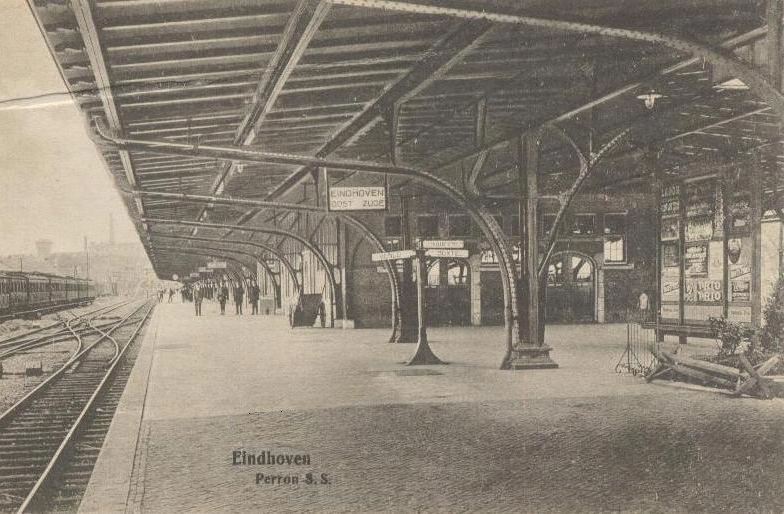
Eindhoven in 1921

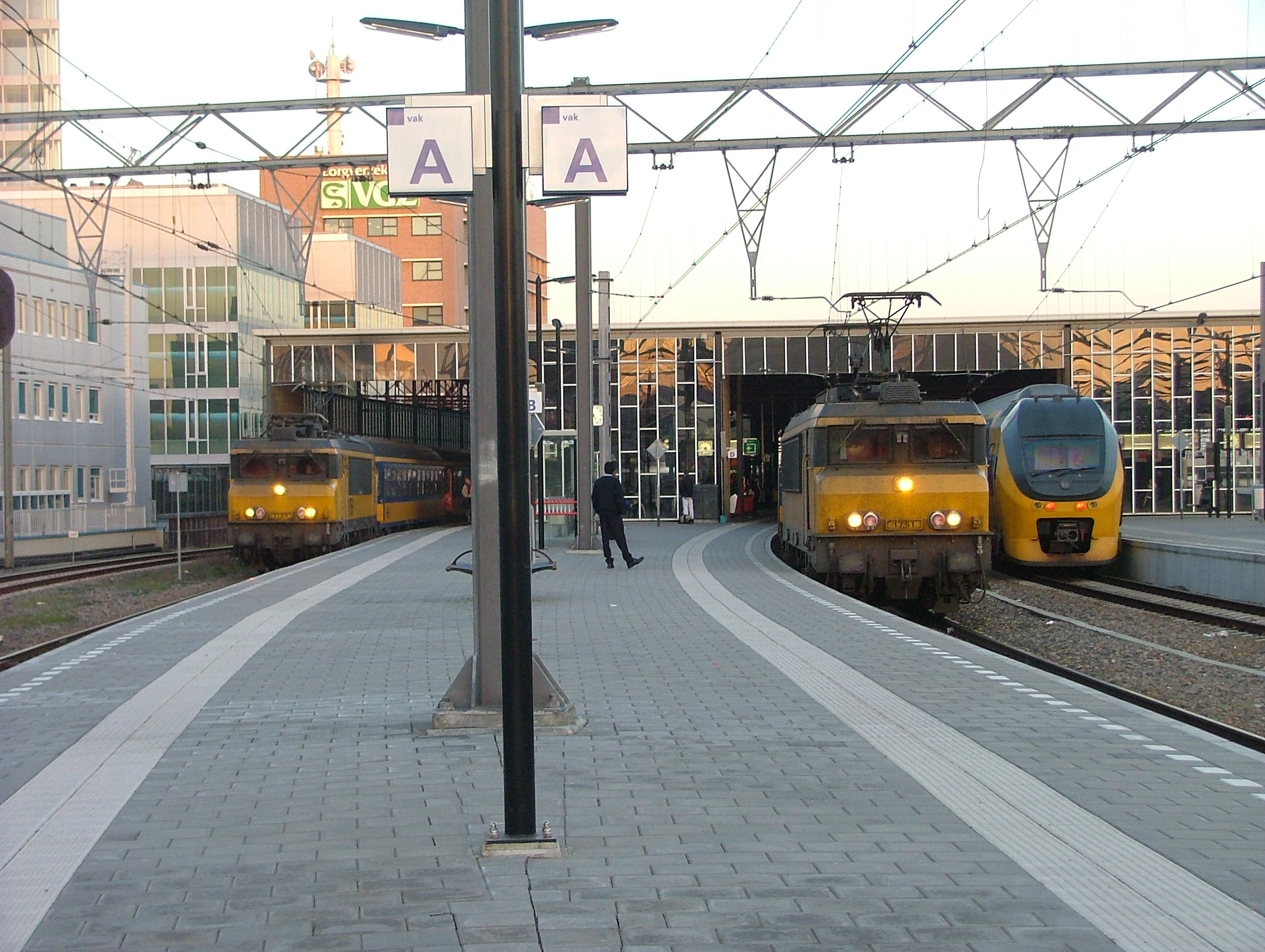
Eindhoven in 2006

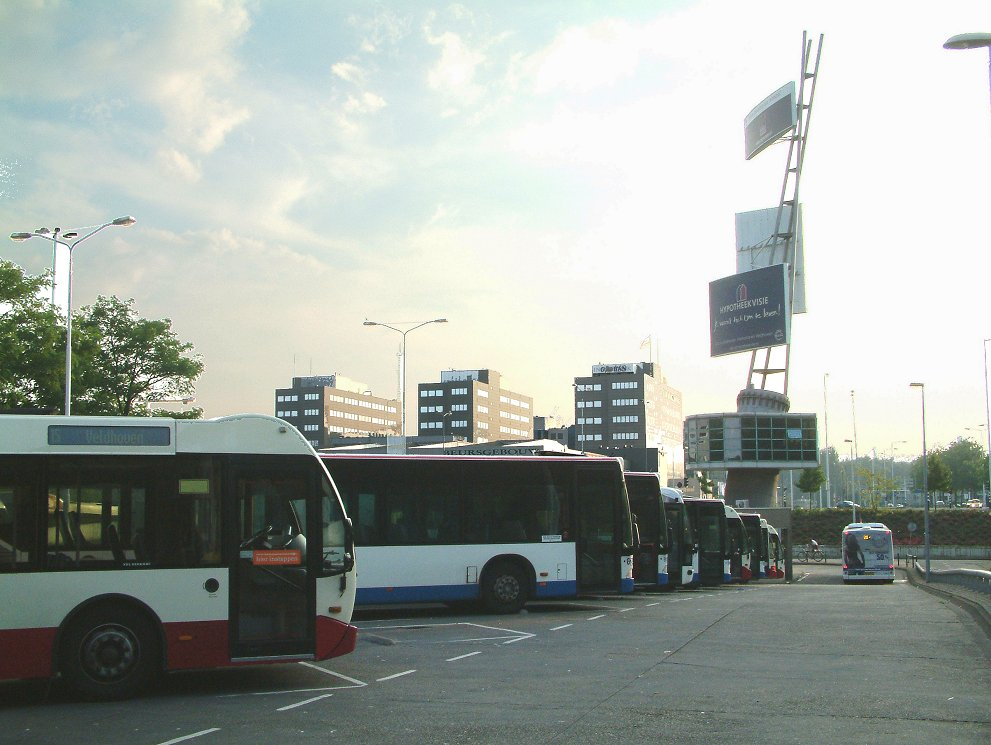
Bus station next to the railway station

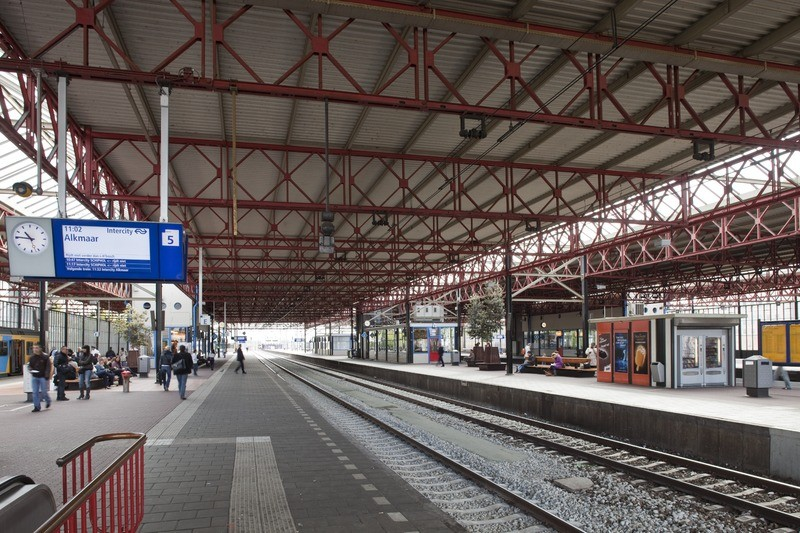
The roof is built from Bailey bridge segments
