= Vught railway station =

Railway station in the Netherlands

Vught
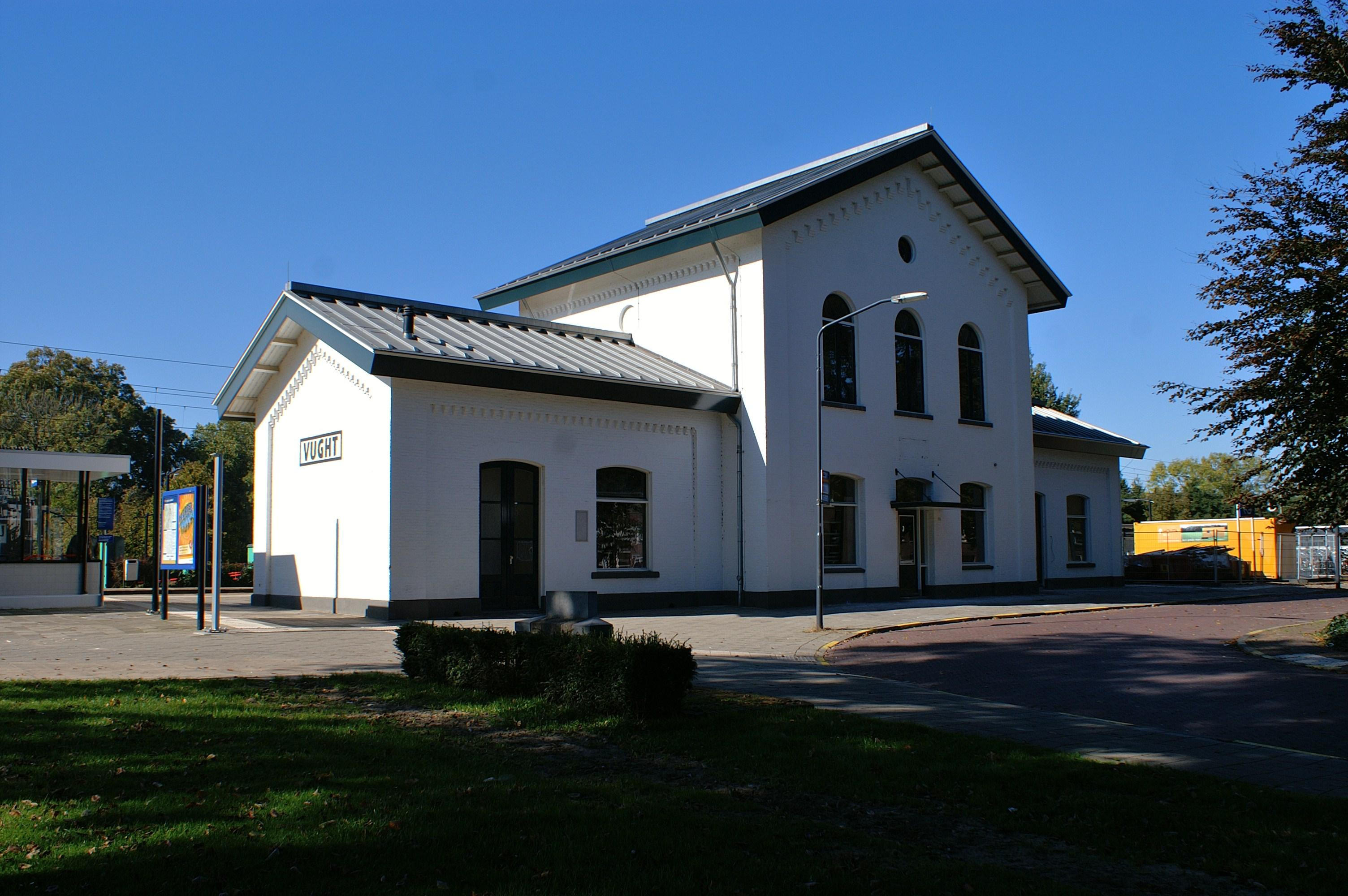

General information
- Location: Netherlands
- Coordinates: 51°39′17″N 5°17′31″E
- Line: Utrecht–Boxtel railway

History
- Opened: 1868

Services
Preceding station	Nederlandse Spoorwegen	Following station
's-Hertogenbosch Terminus	NS Sprinter 4400 Except AM Peak	Boxtel towards Deurne
's-Hertogenbosch towards Oss	NS Sprinter 4400 AM Peak	Boxtel towards Deurne
Location
- Location within Netherlands

Vught is a railway station located in Vught, Netherlands. It is situated on the Utrecht–Boxtel railway. The train services are operated by Nederlandse Spoorwegen, it was opened in 1868.

== Train service ==
The following services currently call at Vught:

- 2x per hour local services (stoptrein) 's-Hertogenbosch - Eindhoven - Helmond - Deurne
