= Boxtel =

- Town and municipality
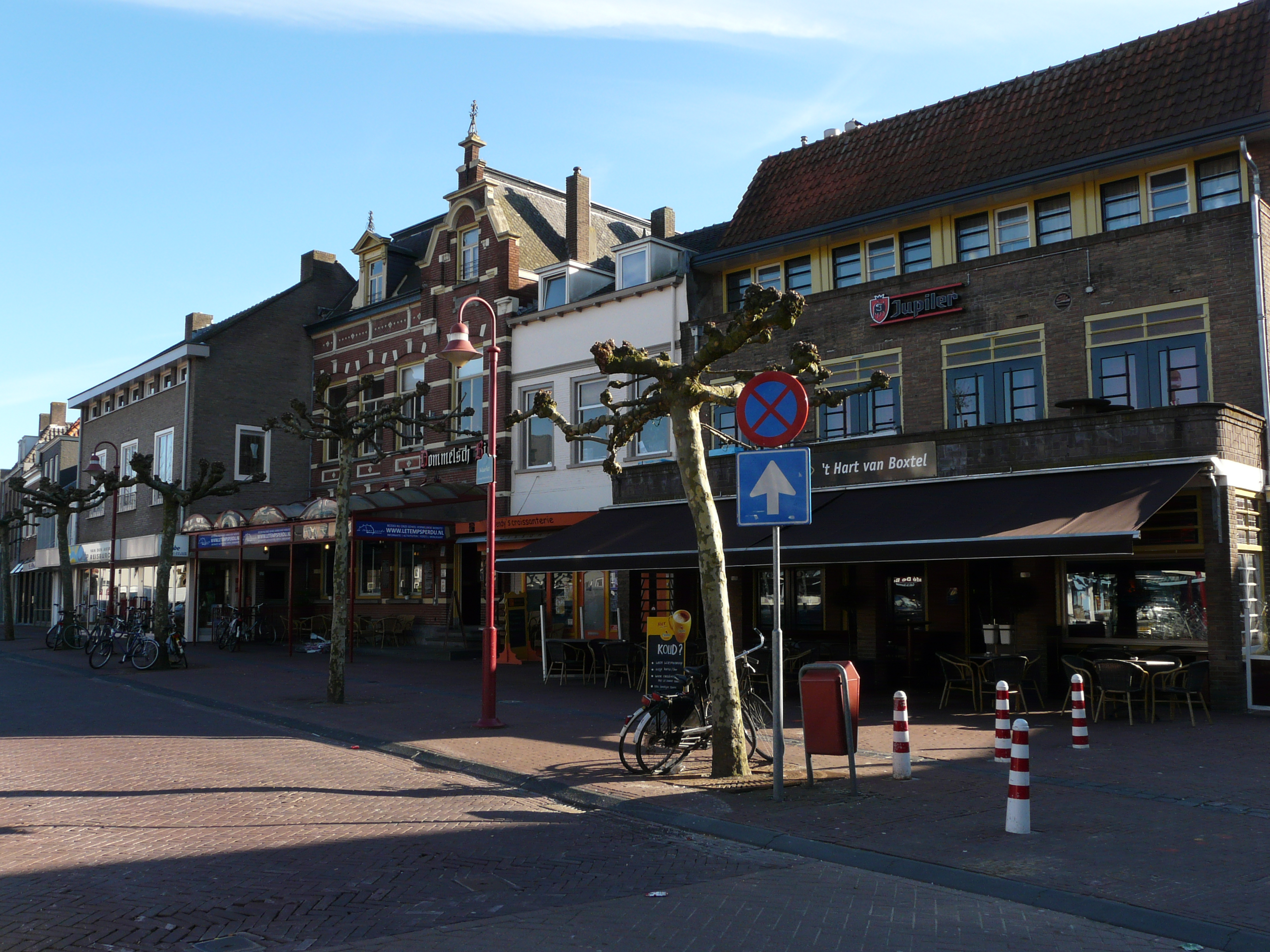
- Boxtel town centre

- Flag Coat of arms

- Location in North Brabant
- Coordinates: 51°35′N 5°20′E
- Country: Netherlands
- Province: North Brabant

Government
  - Body: Municipal council
  - Mayor: Ronald van Meygaarden (None)

Area
  - Total: 64.85 km^{2} (25.04 sq mi)
  - Land: 63.73 km^{2} (24.61 sq mi)
  - Water: 1.12 km^{2} (0.43 sq mi)
- Elevation: 8 m (26 ft)

Population (January 2021)
  - Total: 32,973
  - Density: 517/km^{2} (1,340/sq mi)
- Demonym(s): Boxelaar, Boxtelaar
- Time zone: UTC+1 (CET)
  - Summer (DST): UTC+2 (CEST)
- Postcode: 5280–5283, 5298
- Area code: 0411
- Website: www.boxtel.nl

Boxtel (Dutch pronunciation: [ˈbɔkstəl]) is a municipality and a town in the southern Netherlands. The name derives from Buchestelle and is presumably a combination of 'stelle' (Dutch for stable, safe place) and (deer) buck.

This is the origin of the Van Boxtel family, which has numerous descendants in North Brabant.

The town was the site of the Battle of Boxtel fought in September 1794 during the Flanders campaign. It is often principally remembered as the first battle of the future Duke of Wellington Arthur Wellesley.

== Population centres ==
- Boxtel
- Esch
- Lennisheuvel
- Liempde

=== Topography ===
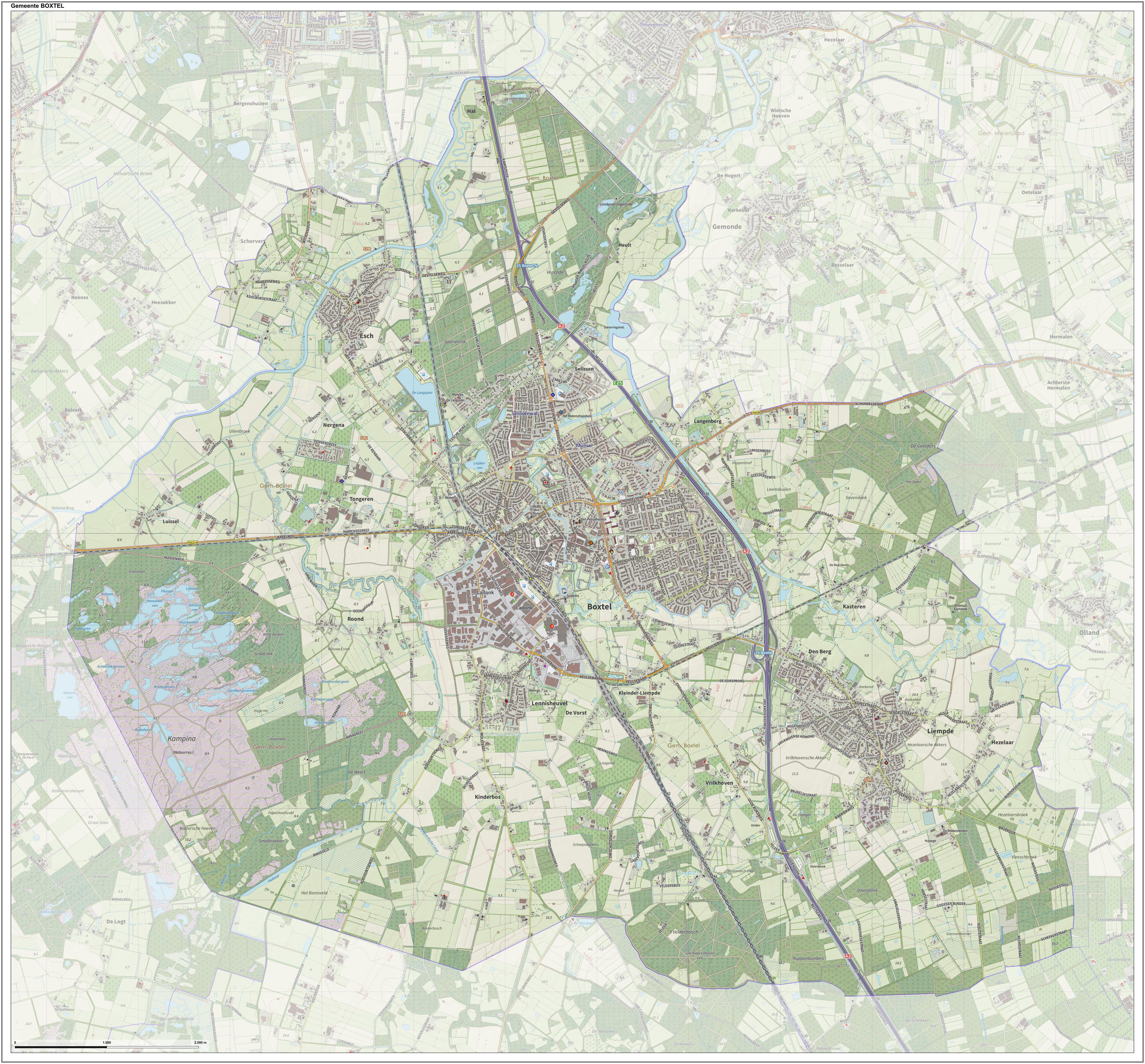

Dutch topographic map of the municipality of Boxtel, 2021

== Notable residents ==
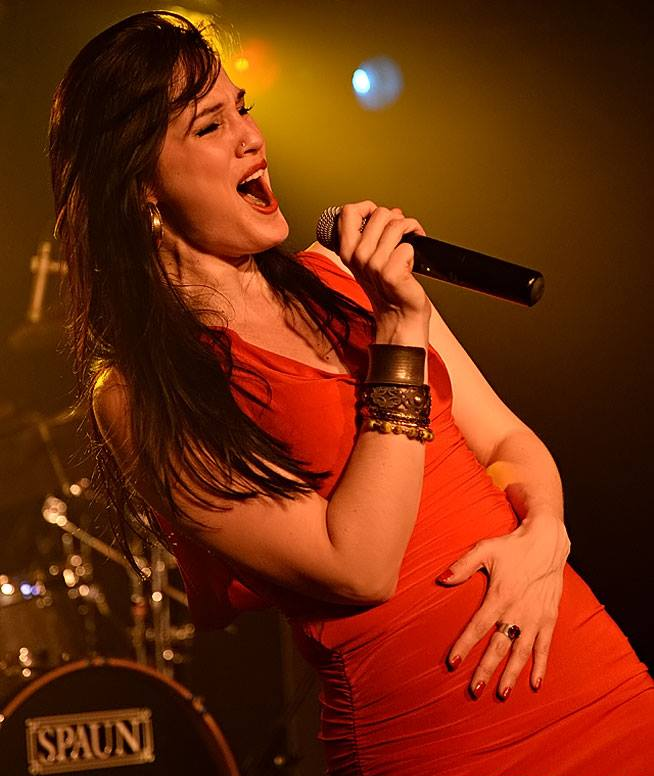
Dianne van Giersbergen, 2014

- José van Dijck (born 1960) a new media author and academic
- Teun Voeten (born 1961) a Dutch photojournalist and cultural anthropologist
- Marcel Wanders (born 1963) a Dutch designer and art director
- Dianne van Giersbergen (born 1985 in Liempde) a spinto soprano and singer-songwriter
- Sam Feldt (born 1993) a Dutch DJ and record producer

=== Sport ===
- Jeroen Delmee (born 1973) a field hockey player and twice Olympic champion
- Bas van Erp (1979–2016) a Dutch wheelchair Paralympic tennis player
- Frank van der Struijk (born 1985) a Dutch footballer with over 300 club caps
- Michael van Gerwen (born 1989) a Dutch professional, 3-time World Darts Champion
- Glenn Schuurman (born 1991) a Dutch field hockey player, competed at the 2016 Summer Olympics
- Silvinho Esajas (born 2002) a Dutch professional footballer
- Kay Karssemakers (born 2004) a Dutch professional motocross racer

== Transportation ==
- Boxtel railway station

== Economy ==
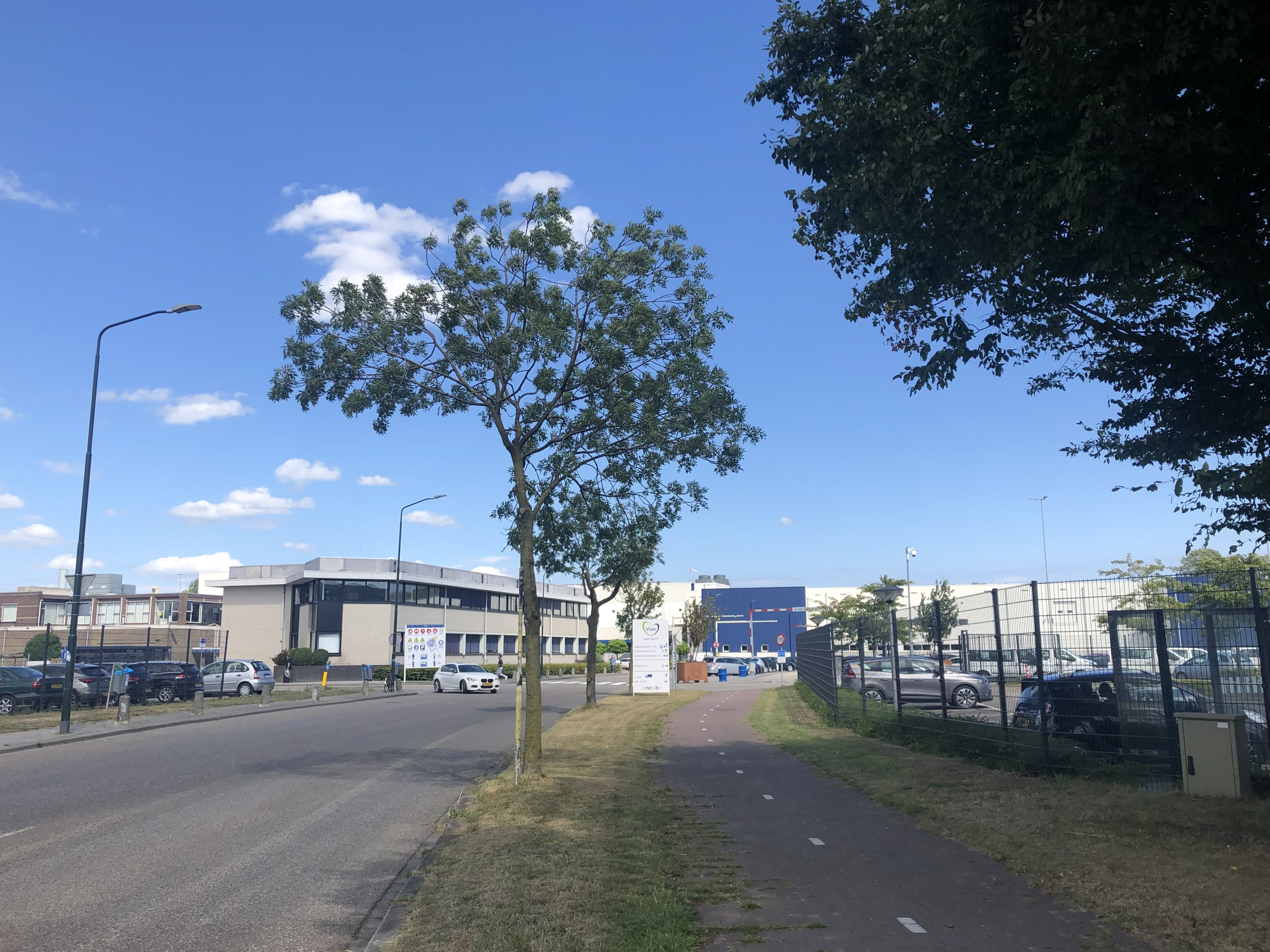
Vion production site in Boxtel

Vion NV, one of the largest European meat processors, is headquartered in Boxtel and operates its largest pig slaughterhouse there.

== Gallery ==
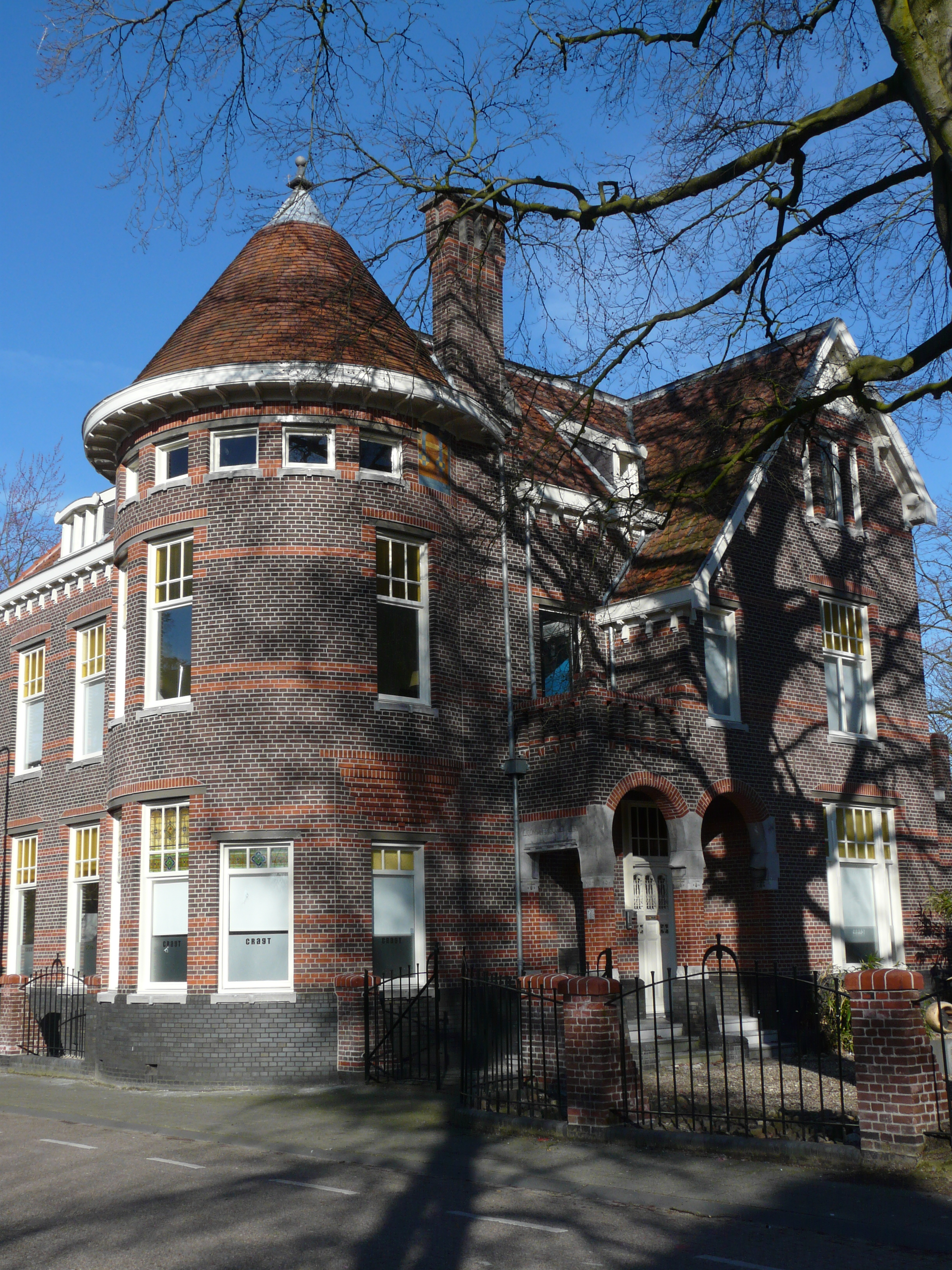
House in Boxtel

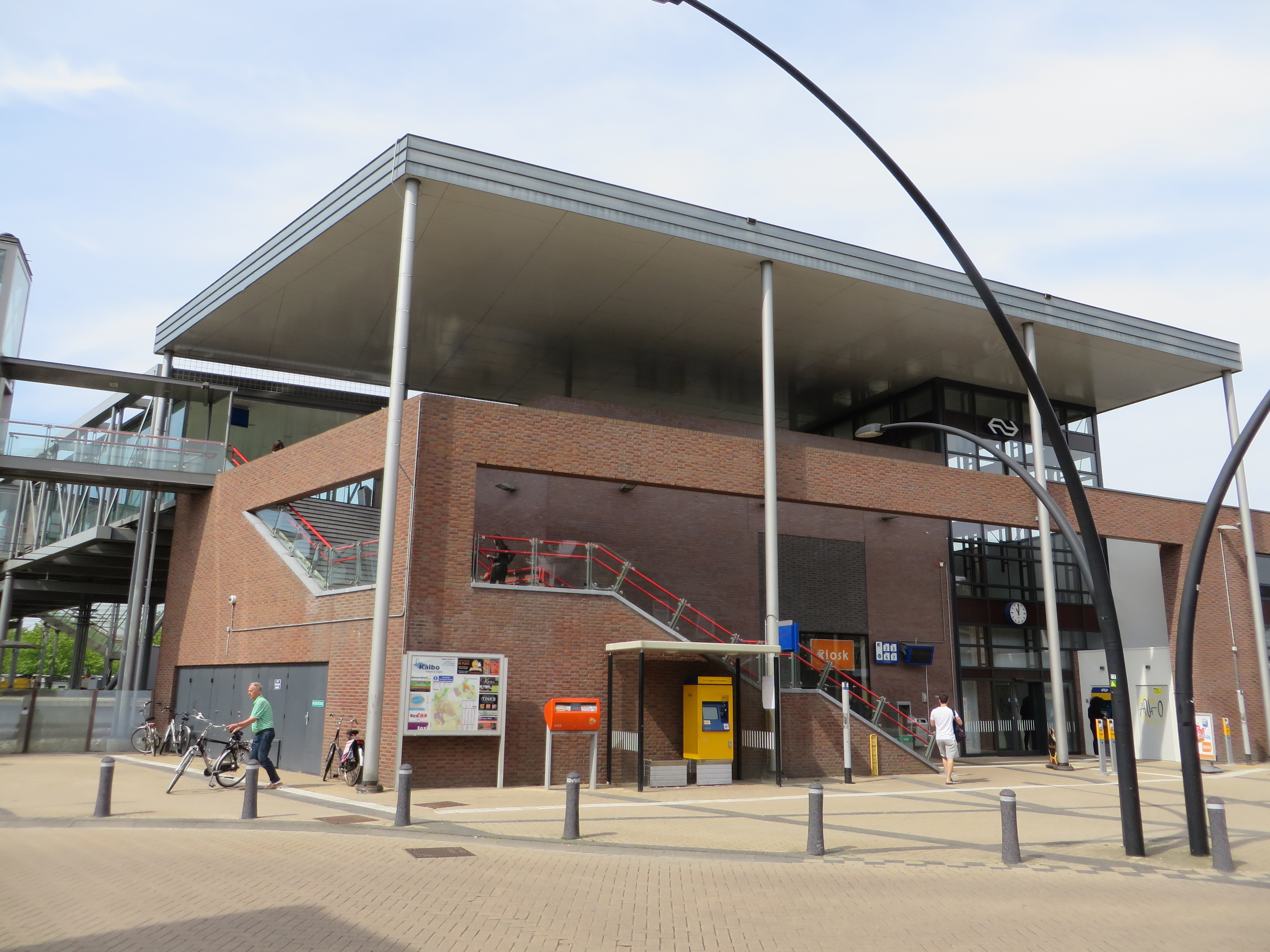
Boxtel Station

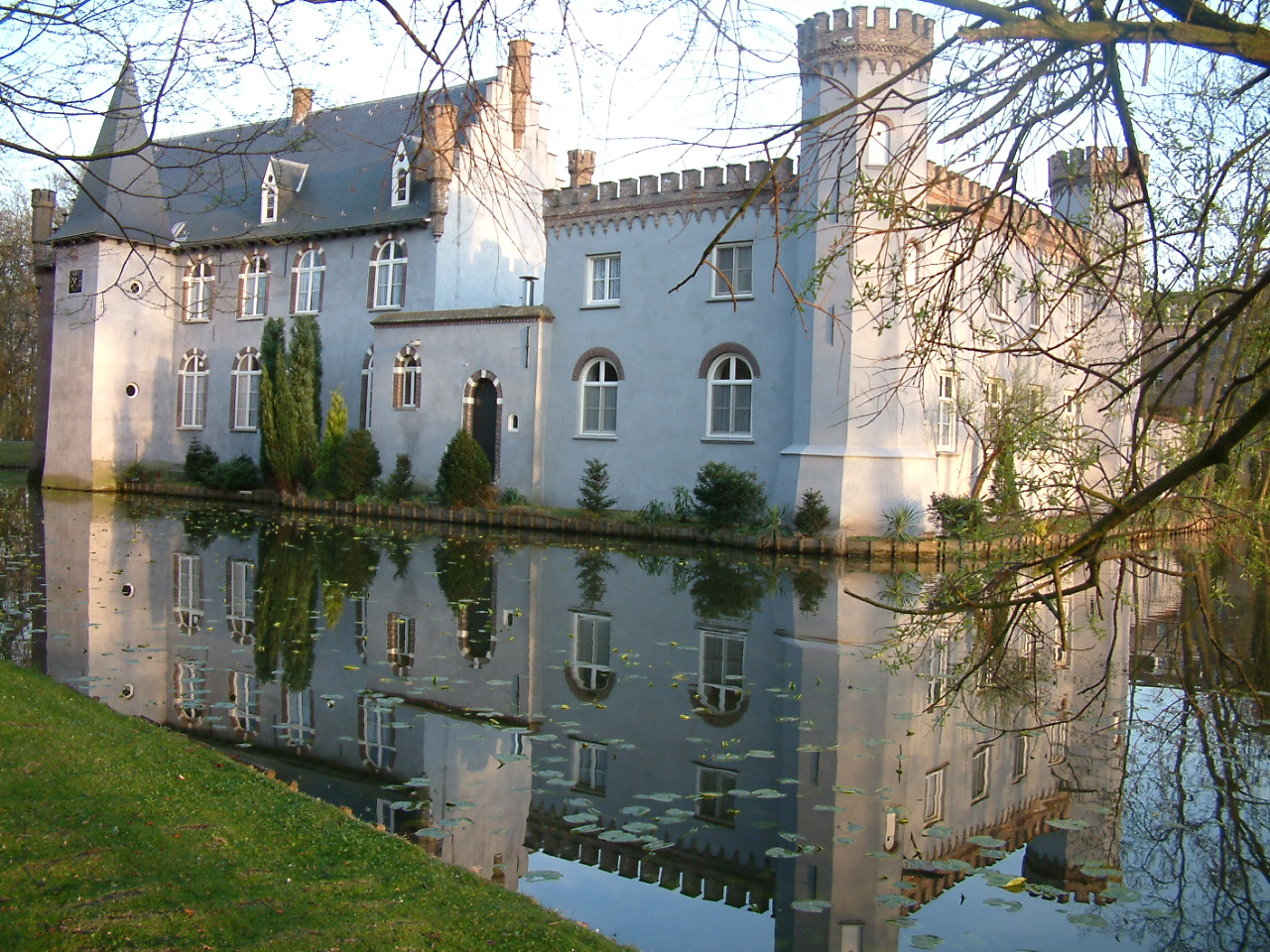
Kasteel Stapelen

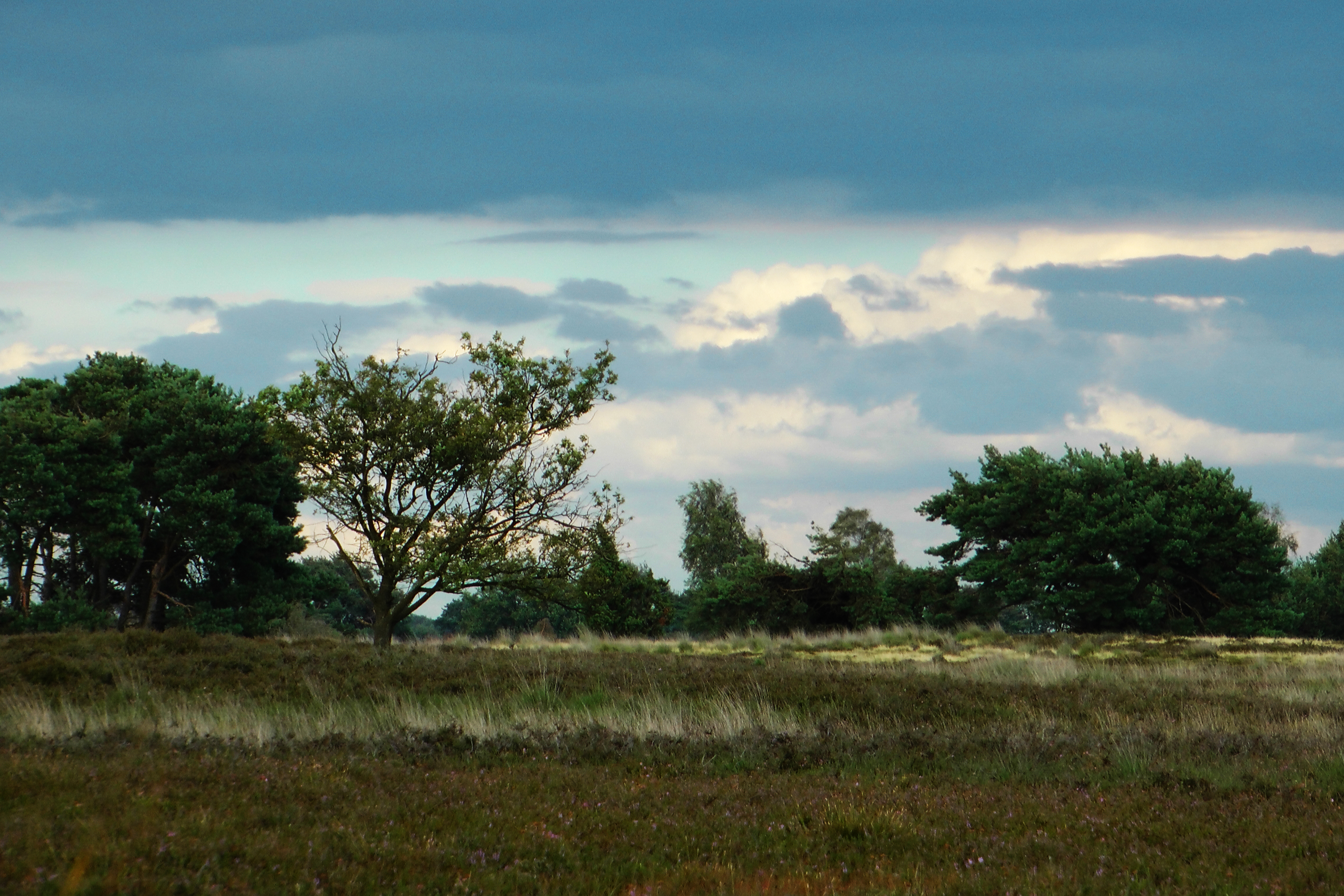
Natuurgebied Kampina in Boxtel

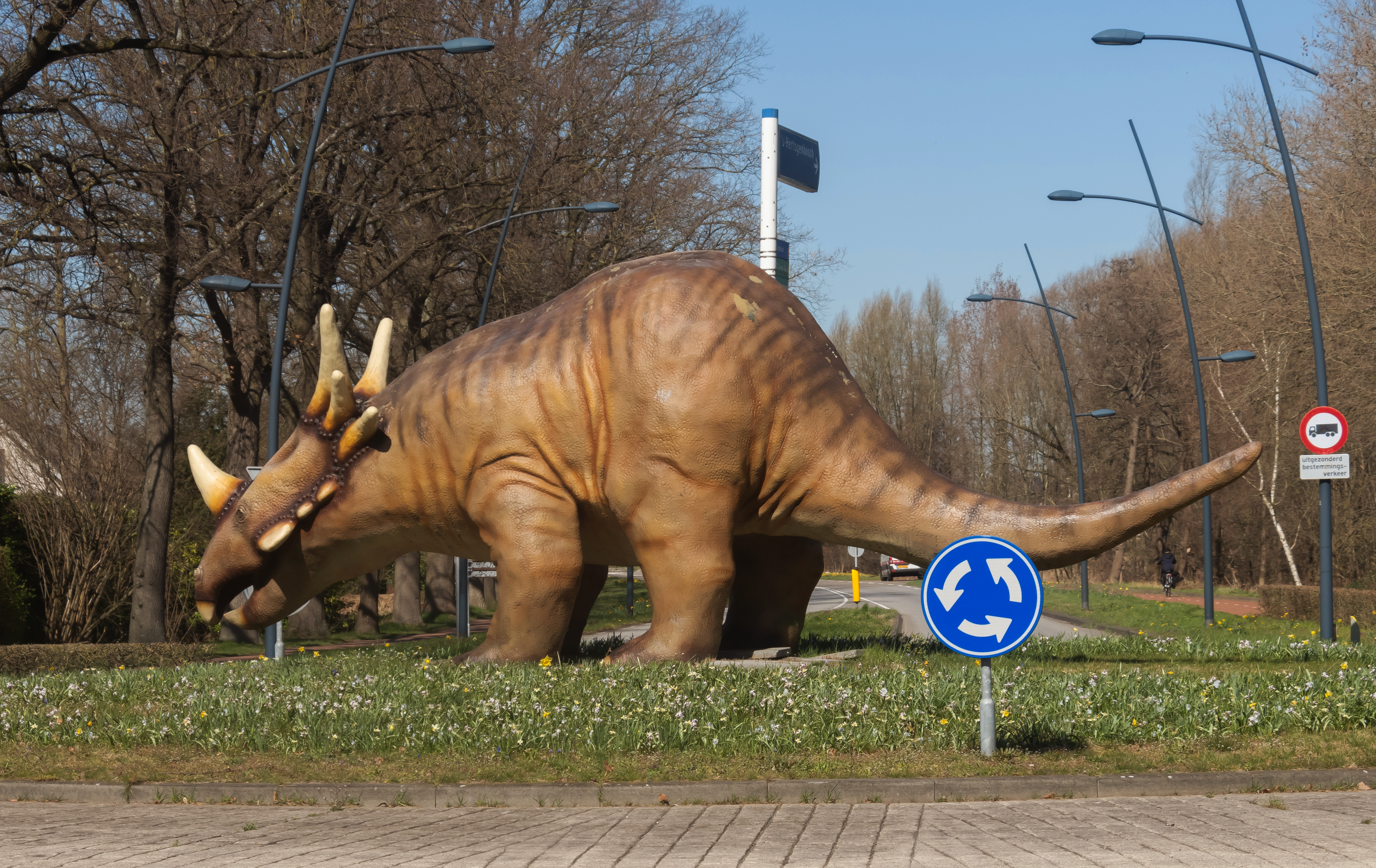
Boxtel, roundabout: Dinorotonde
