= Tilburg railway station =

Railway station in the Netherlands

Tilburg
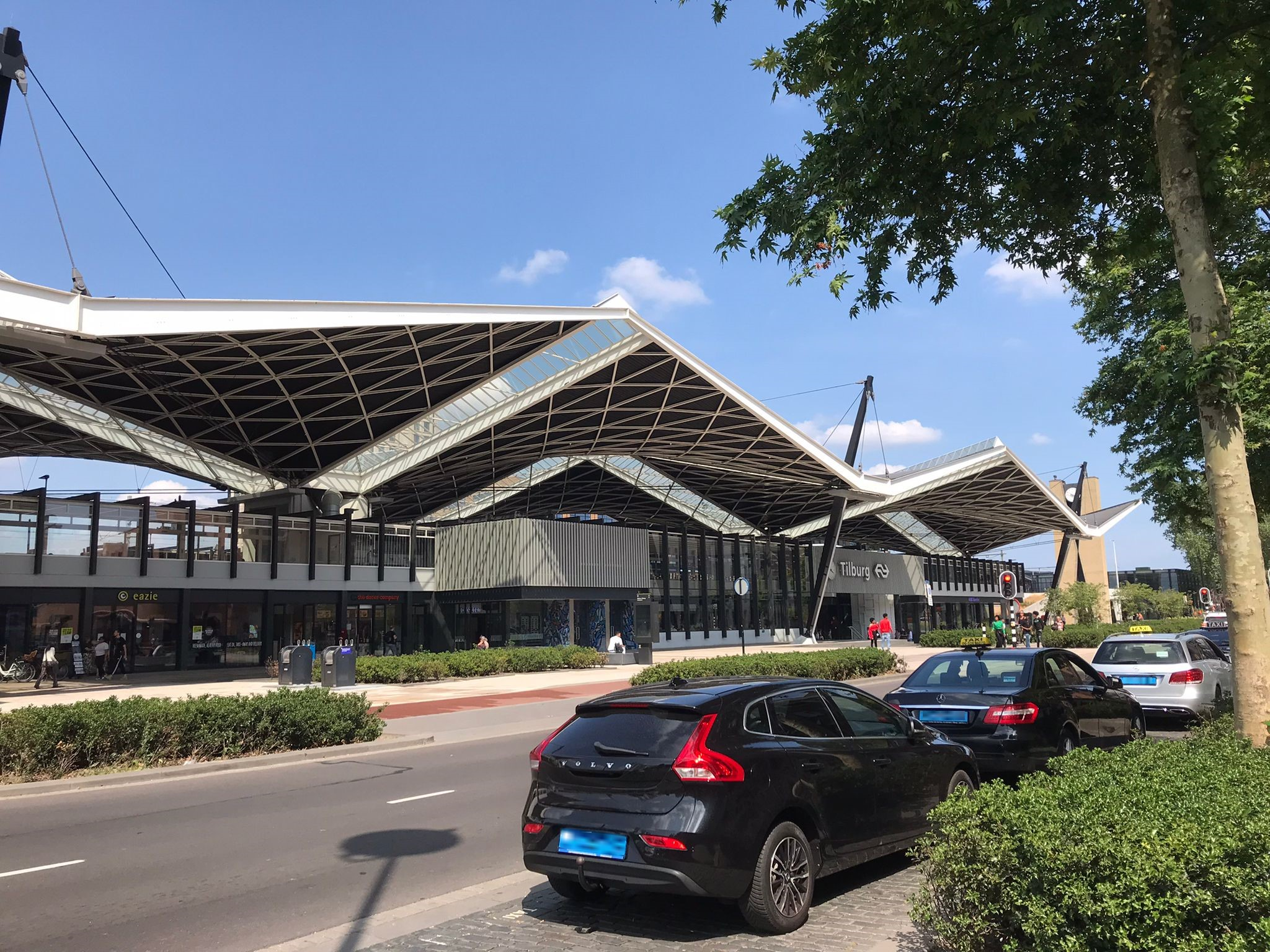

General information
- Location: Tilburg, Netherlands
- Coordinates: 51°33′38″N 5°04′58″E
- Lines: Breda–Eindhoven railway Tilburg–Nijmegen railway
- Connections: Arriva: 1, 2, 3, 4, 5, 6, 7, 8, 9, 131, 132, 136, 140, 141, 142, 143, 300, 301, 327, 328, 601, 630, 632, 801; De Lijn: 450

Other information
- Station code: Tb

History
- Opened: 5 October 1863

Services
Preceding station	Nederlandse Spoorwegen	Following station
Breda towards Den Haag Centraal	NS Intercity 1100	Eindhoven Centraal Terminus
Breda towards Roosendaal	NS Intercity 3600	's-Hertogenbosch towards Zwolle
Breda towards Rotterdam Centraal	NS Nachtnet 21410 Fri/Sat nights only	Eindhoven Centraal Terminus
Terminus	NS Nachtnet 21420 Fri/Sat nights only	's-Hertogenbosch Terminus
Tilburg Universiteit Terminus	NS Sprinter 6400	Oisterwijk towards Weert
Tilburg Universiteit towards Dordrecht	NS Sprinter 6600 Mon-Sat until 19:00	's-Hertogenbosch towards Arnhem Centraal
Tilburg Universiteit towards Dordrecht	NS Sprinter 6600 After 19:00 and Sun	's-Hertogenbosch towards Nijmegen
Location
- Location within Netherlands

Tilburg railway station is a railway station located in Tilburg in the province of North Brabant, Netherlands. The station was opened on 5 October 1863 and is located on the Breda–Eindhoven railway and Tilburg–Nijmegen railway. The train services are operated by Nederlandse Spoorwegen (NS).

North of this train station used to be the large Tilburg Works, where large scale work were carried out on locomotives. Since 2013 these works are carried out northeast of the city in a new industrial area, called Loven-Noord, along the Tilburg–Nijmegen railway.

== Gallery ==
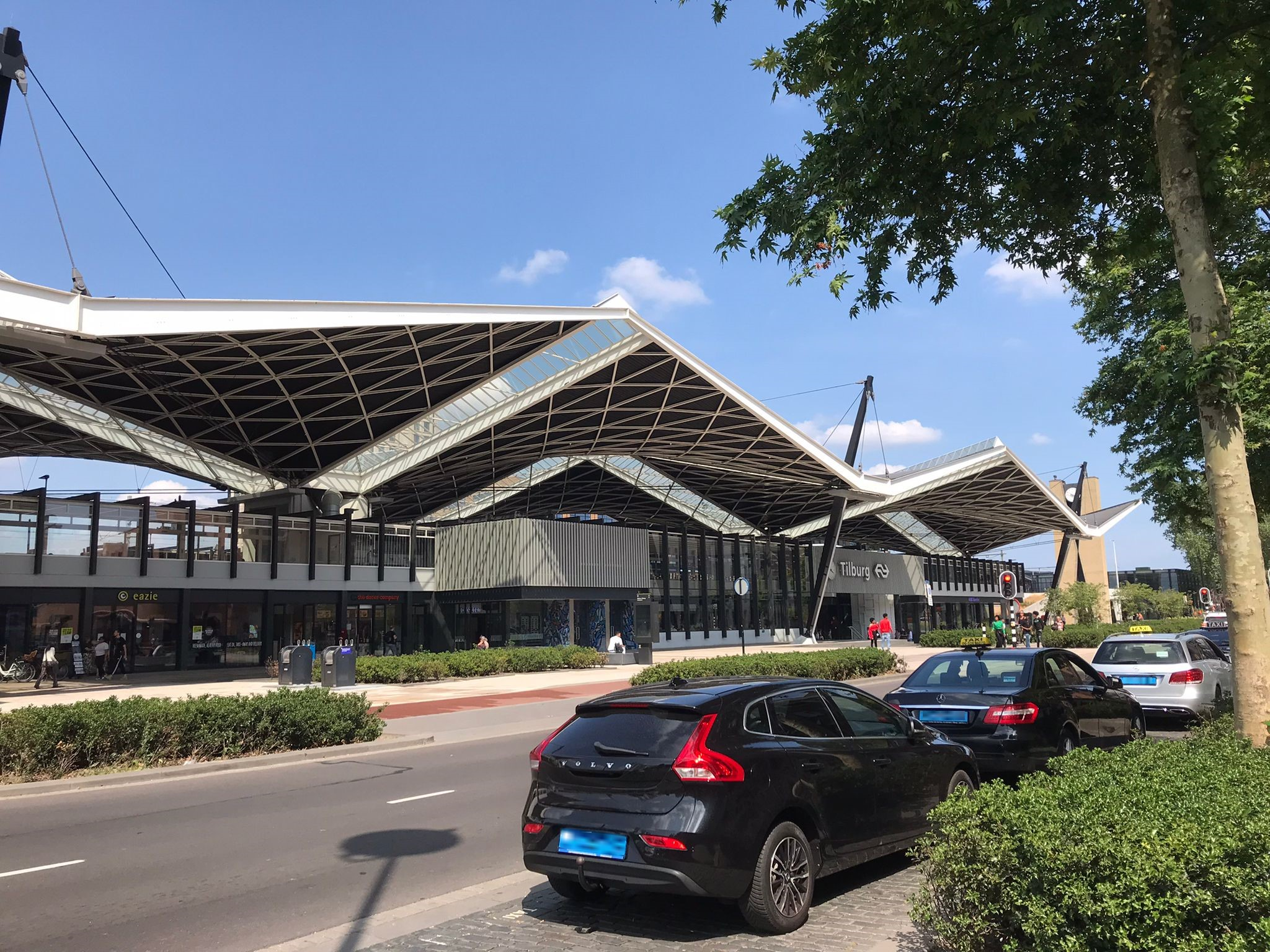
Tilburg Station, 2023

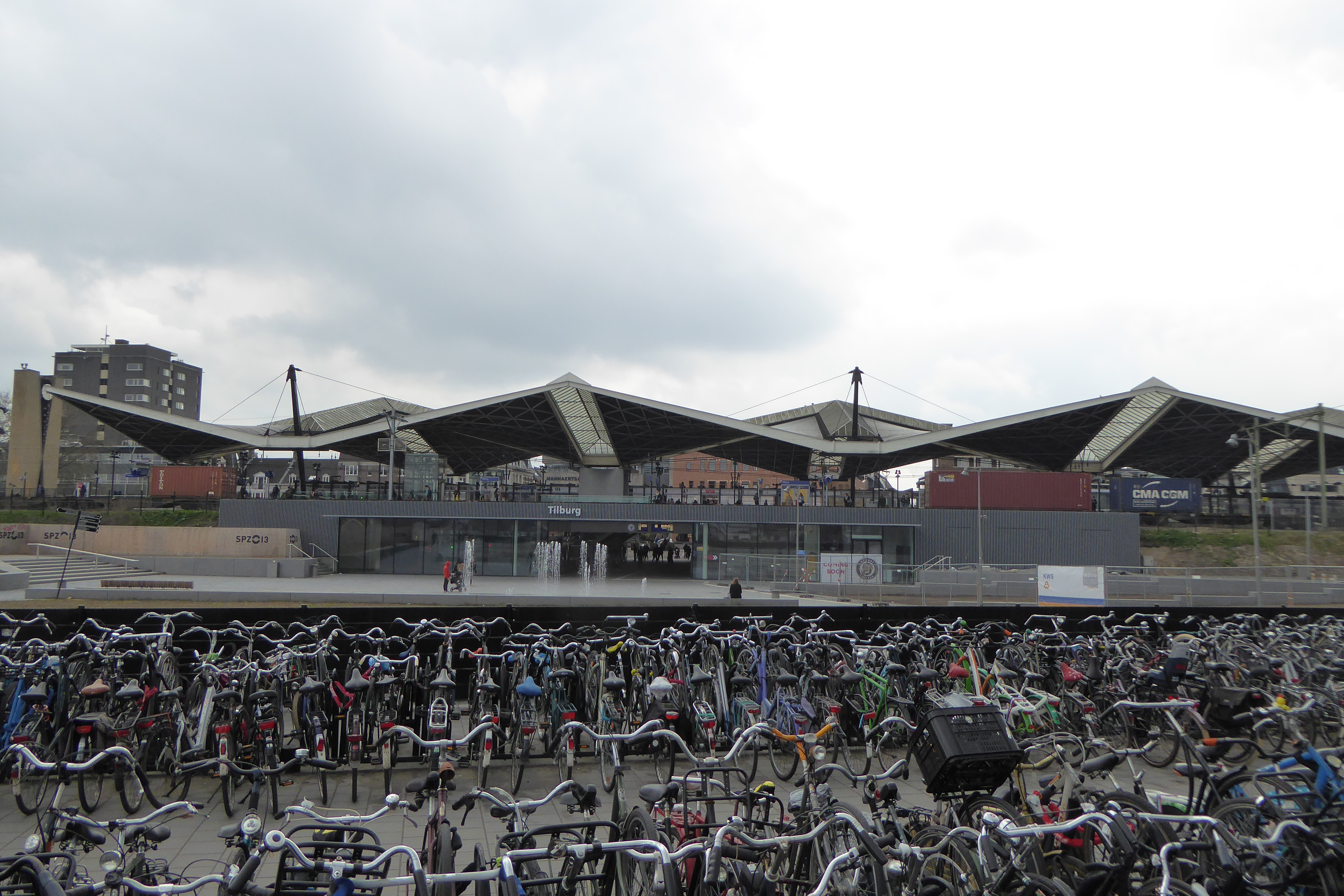
Tilburg Station, 2017

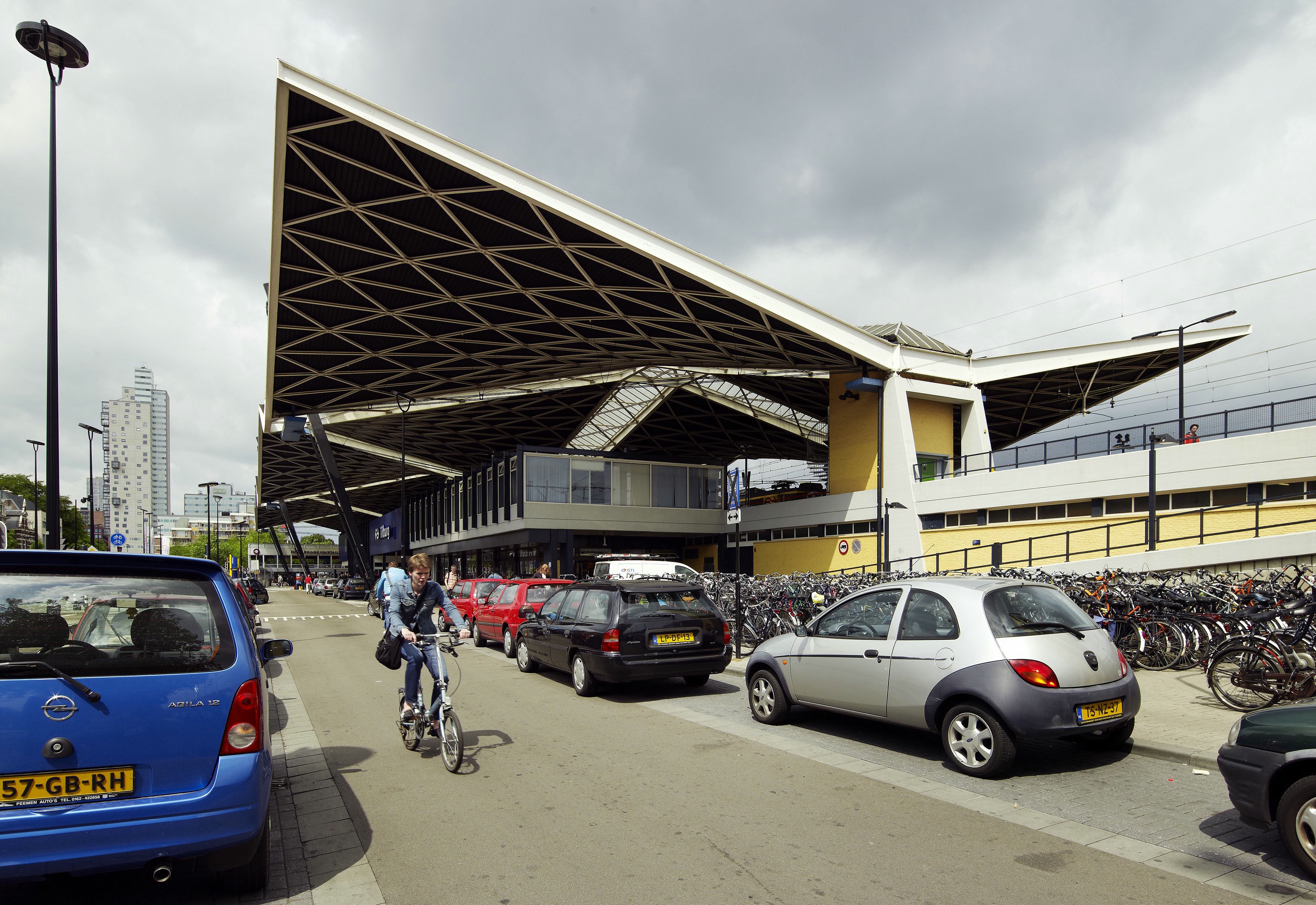
Tilburg Station, 2009

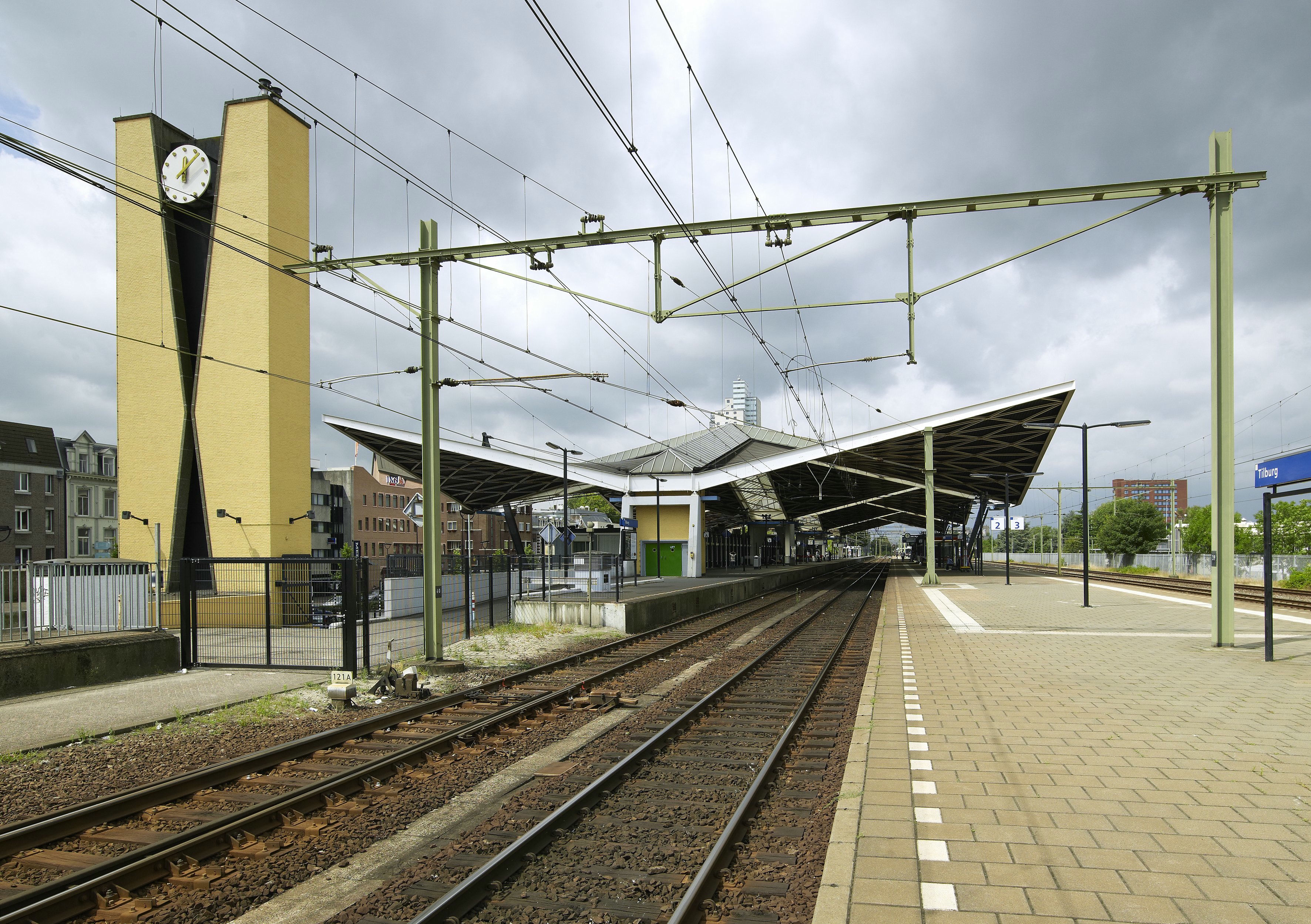
Tilburg Station, 2009

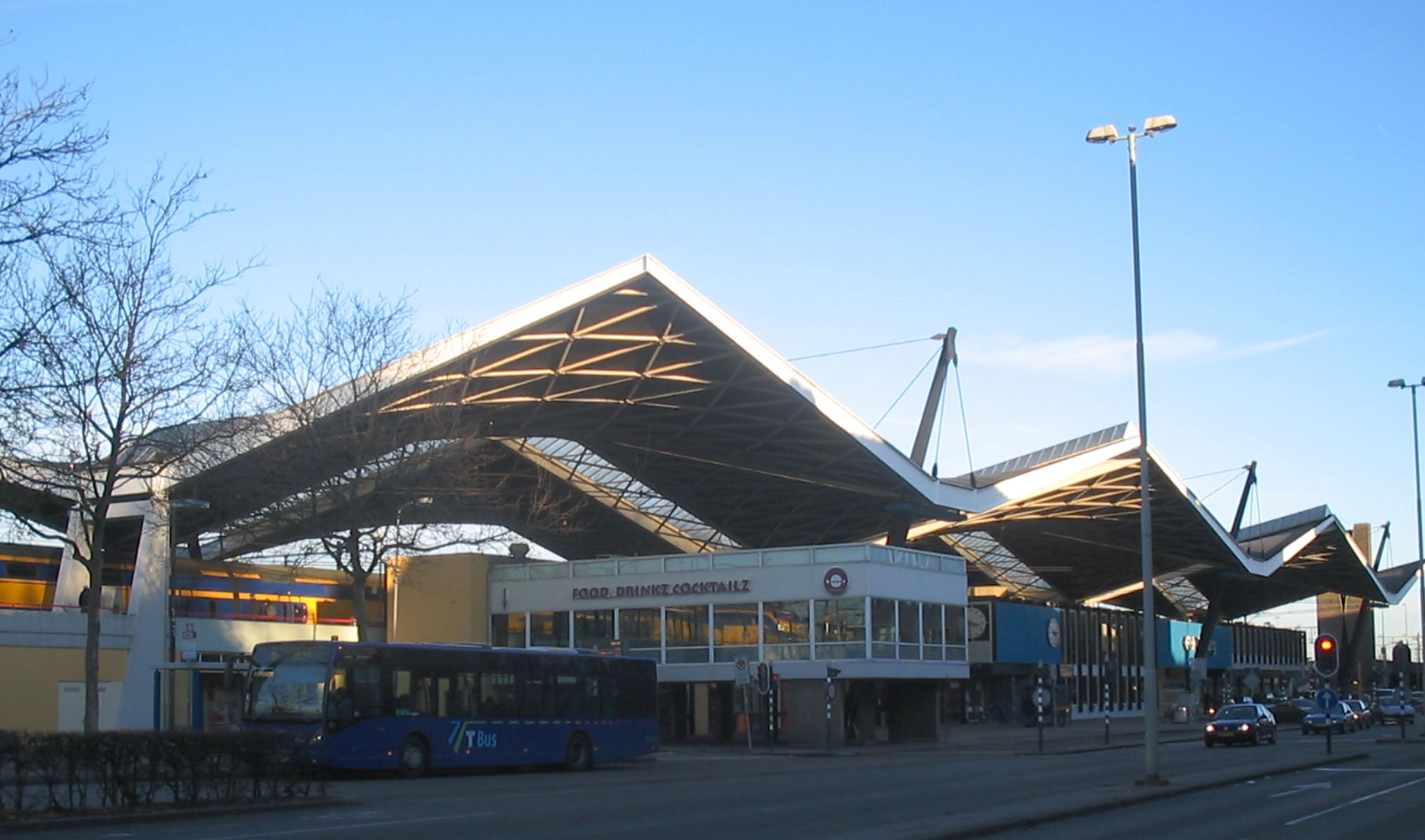
Tilburg Station, 2005

== Train services ==
The following services currently call at Tilburg:

- 2x per hour intercity services The Hague - Rotterdam - Breda - Tilburg - Eindhoven
- 2x per hour intercity services Zwolle - Deventer - Arnhem - Nijmegen - 's-Hertogenbosch - Tilburg - Breda - Roosendaal
- 1x per hour night train (nachtnet) service Rotterdam - Breda - Tilburg - Eindhoven (weekends only)
- 2x per hour local services (sprinter) Tilburg Universiteit - Tilburg - Oisterwijk - Boxtel - Best - Eindhoven - Geldrop - Heeze - Maarheeze - Weert
- 2x per hour local services (sprinter) Arnhem - Nijmegen - Oss - 's-Hertogenbosch - Tilburg - Gilze-Rijen - Breda - Dordrecht

== Bus services ==
The station is served by city bus services (stadsbussen) as well as several regional bus services (streekbussen)

=== City services ===
There are 9 city bus lines. All lines are operated by Arriva under the Bravo brand. The routes of the city buses are as follows:

- 1: Quirijnstok - Heikant - Kraaiven - Het Zand - Centraal Station - City Centre - Oud Zuid - Stappegoor - ETZ Elisabeth
- 2: Reeshof - Wandelbos - Het Zand - De Reit - Centraal Station - City Centre - Broekhoven - ETZ Elisabeth - Stappegoor - Goirle
- 3: Centraal Station - Wandelbos - Reeshof - Koolhoven
- 4: Centraal Station - University - Witbrant - Reeshof
- 5: Centraal Station - Goirke - Heikant - Stokhasselt
- 6: Centraal Station - Loven - Goirke - Quirijnstok - Heikant
- 7: Wandelbos - Goirke - Centraal Station - City Centre - De Reit - Zorgvlied - Blaak
- 8: Centraal Station - City Centre - Korvel - Het Laar
- 9: Centraal Station - Oost - Berkel-Enschot Dorp - Udenhout Dorp

=== Regional services ===
All lines are operated by Arriva under the Bravo brand, with the exception of line 450, operated by Belgian De Lijn.

- 131: Rijen - Hulten - Gilze - Tilburg
- 132: Breda - Ulvenhout - Chaam (- Ulicoten) - Baarle Nassau - Alphen - Riel - Goirle - Tilburg
- 136: 's-Hertogenbosch - Vlijmen - Nieuwkuijk - Drunen - Waalwijk - Sprang-Capelle - Kaatsheuvel - Loon op Zand - Tilburg
- 140: 's-Hertogenbosch - Vught - Helvoirt - Haaren - Oisterwijk - Berkel-Enschot - Tilburg
- 141: Tilburg - Moergestel - Spoordonk - Oirschot - Best
- 142: Tilburg - Hilvarenbeek - Diessen - Middelbeers - Oostelbeers - Oirschot - Best
- 143: Tilburg - Hilvarenbeek - Esbeek - Lage Mierde - Hooge Mierde - Reusel
- 300: (Bravo direct) 's-Hertogenbosch - Waalwijk - Sprang-Capelle - Kaatsheuvel - Efteling - Loon op Zand - Tilburg
- 301: (Bravo direct) 's-Hertogenbosch - Vlijmen - Drunen - Waalwijk - Sprang-Capelle - Kaatsheuvel - Efteling - Loon op Zand - Tilburg
- 327: (Bravo direct) Breda - Teteringen - Oosterhout - Oosteind - Dongen - Tilburg
- 328: (Bravo direct) Oosterhout - Oosteind - Dongen - Tilburg
- 450: Tilburg - Goirle - Poppel - Weelde - Ravels - Oud-Turnhout - Turnhout
- 601: (school line) Centraal Station - Stappegoor
- 630: (school line) Gilze → Tilburg
- 632: (school line) Baarle-Nassau → Alphen → Rechte Heide → Riel → Goirle → Tilburg
- 801: Tilburg - Efteling
