= 's-Hertogenbosch railway station =

Railway station located in 's-Hertogenbosch, the Netherlands

's-Hertogenbosch
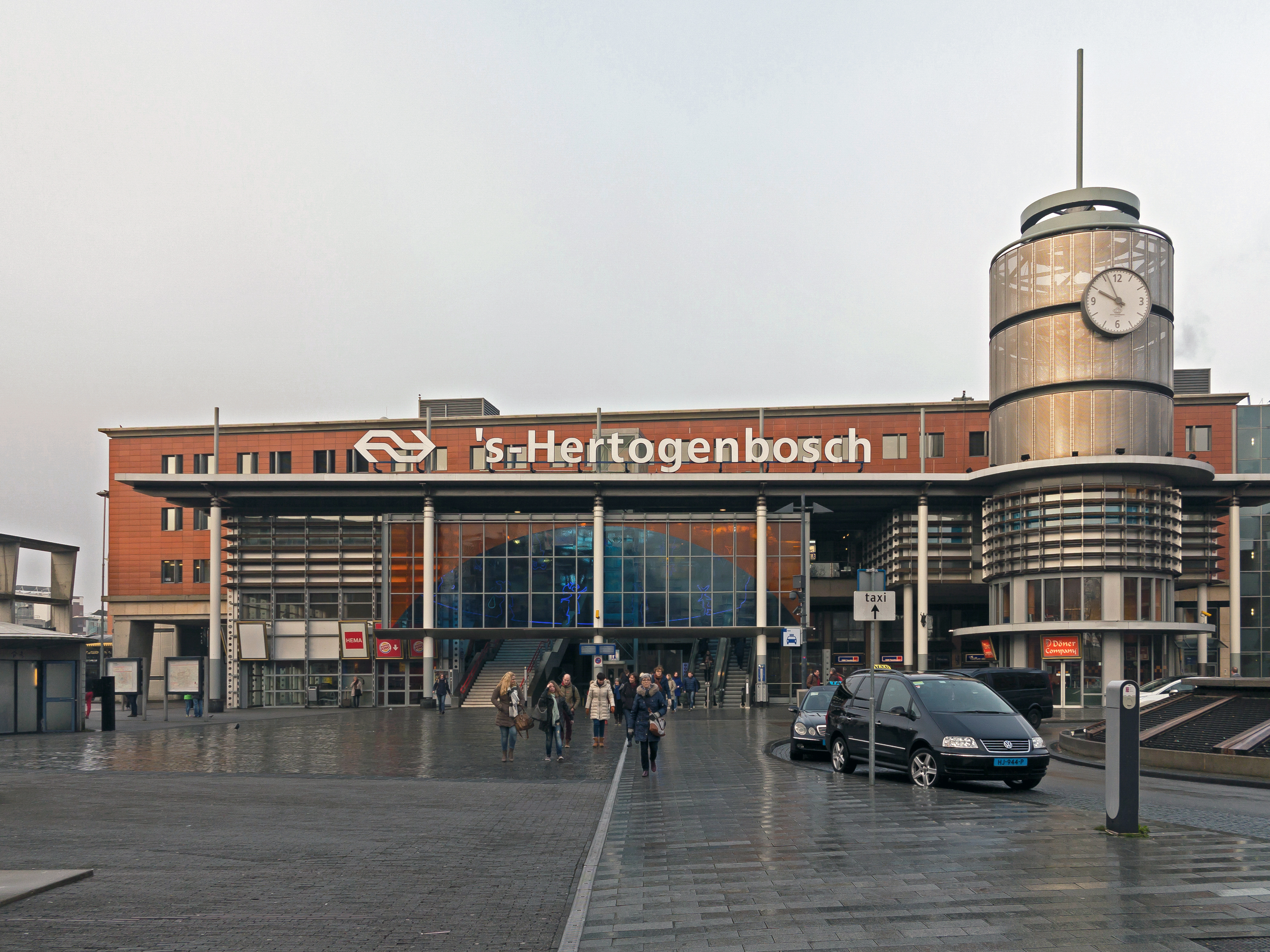
- Station entrance

General information
- Location: 's-Hertogenbosch, North Brabant, Netherlands
- Coordinates: 51.69°N 5.293333°E
- System: NS interurban rail station
- Owner: Nederlandse Spoorwegen
- Lines: Utrecht–Boxtel railway Tilburg–Nijmegen railway
- Platforms: 2 island platforms 1 side platform
- Tracks: 8
- Connections: Arriva: 1, 2, 3, 4, 5, 6, 7, 8, 9, 10, 11, 12, 13, 90, 121, 135, 136, 140, 154, 156, 158, 159, 165, 166, 203, 213, 239, 300, 301, 302, 306, 639, 643, 662, 665, 666, 800

Construction
- Accessible: yes

Other information
- Station code: Ht

History
- Opened: 1 November 1868; 157 years ago

Passengers
- 2006: 14.652 million ▲0.2%

Services
Preceding station	Nederlandse Spoorwegen	Following station
Eindhoven Centraal towards Maastricht	NS Intercity 2700 Mon-Thur until 19:00	Utrecht Centraal towards Alkmaar
Eindhoven Centraal towards Maastricht	NS Intercity 2900 After 19:00 and Fri-Sun only	Utrecht Centraal towards Enkhuizen
Eindhoven Centraal towards Venlo	NS Intercity 3500	Utrecht Centraal towards Dordrecht
Tilburg towards Roosendaal	NS Intercity 3600	Oss towards Zwolle
Eindhoven Centraal towards Heerlen	NS Intercity 3900 Mon-Thur until 19:30	Utrecht Centraal towards Enkhuizen
Eindhoven Centraal Terminus	NS Nachtnet 21400 Fri/Sat nights only	Utrecht Centraal Terminus
Tilburg Terminus	NS Nachtnet 21420 Fri/Sat nights only	Terminus
Vught towards Deurne	NS Sprinter 4400 Except AM Peak	Terminus
Vught towards Deurne	NS Sprinter 4400 AM Peak	's-Hertogenbosch Oost towards Oss
Terminus	NS Sprinter 6000 After 18:00 and Fri-Sun	Zaltbommel towards Den Haag Centraal
Tilburg towards Dordrecht	NS Sprinter 6600 Mon-Sat until 19:00	's-Hertogenbosch Oost towards Arnhem Centraal
Tilburg towards Dordrecht	NS Sprinter 6600 After 19:00 and Sun	's-Hertogenbosch Oost towards Nijmegen
Terminus	NS Sprinter 8800 Mon-Thur until 18:00	Zaltbommel towards Leiden Centraal
Preceding station	Arriva Netherlands	Following station
Utrecht Centraal towards Schiphol Airport	Nachttrein 32710 Friday night only	Eindhoven Centraal towards Maastricht
Location
- Location within Netherlands

's-Hertogenbosch (Dutch pronunciation: [ˌsɛrtoːɣə(m)ˈbɔs]) is a railway station located in 's-Hertogenbosch in North Brabant, Netherlands. The station and all services operating from it are operated by Nederlandse Spoorwegen.

== History ==
's-Hertogenbosch station opened on 1 November 1868 as the northern terminus of the southern part of the Utrecht–Boxtel railway (Staatslijn H), with service south to Boxtel. Only in 1870 were the two parts of Line H joined, allowing for direct service to Utrecht Centraal. As the town was a fortress at the time, the station was designed with attack in mind; its wood truss construction allowed it to be dismantled or damaged with minimal waste. 's-Hertogenbosch station was further expanded upon the opening of the Tilburg–Nijmegen railway, making it an important railway junction.

In 1896, the original station was replaced with a large brick structure designed by Eduard Cuypers. The station was relocated a few hundred metres south of the original, along with the realignment of the tracks to the west. The second 's-Hertogenbosch station was characterised by its neo-Renaissance style, with a second floor for railway employees. During World War II, at 16 September 1944, the station caught fire and burnt down; it was never rebuilt to its former glory.

A more modern, post-war building designed by Sybold van Ravesteyn was erected in 1951. The remaining parts of the second building were incorporated, while the third station's canopy remains to this day. 's-Hertogenbosch was again rebuilt in 1998, with an extension of the roof to the other island platform. Much of the renovation consisted of an aerial walkway, the Stationspasserelle, connecting the roadways on either side of the tracks, and the removal of a special ramp to the platforms. Criticism of the fourth station was levied due to wind sensitivity; Nederlandse Spoorwegen retaliated by declaring: "You are indeed at the train station to go, not to hang out."

== Train services ==
The station is an important interchange station, with trains coming from several different directions. 's-Hertogenbosch was the only Dutch station which provided in Auto-Train services. Services ran into Avignon, Bologna and Livorno. Auto-Trains were operated by Euro-Express-Traincharter.

=== Railway lines ===
Since 2023 the following services from the Nederlandse Spoorwegen call every 30 minutes at 's-Hertogenbosch:

Series	Route	Stock	Service
Intercity 800	(Den Helder –) Alkmaar – Amsterdam – Utrecht – 's-Hertogenbosch – Eindhoven – Maastricht	NS VIRM	—N/a
Intercity 2900	Enkhuizen – Amsterdam – Utrecht – 's-Hertogenbosch – Eindhoven – Maastricht	NS VIRM	Early morning and evening hours
Intercity 3500	Schiphol Airport – Utrecht – 's-Hertogenbosch – Eindhoven – Venlo	NS VIRM	—N/a
Intercity 3600	Roosendaal – Breda – Tilburg – s-Hertogenbosch – Nijmegen – Arnhem – Deventer – Zwolle	NS DDZ, NS VIRM	—N/a
Intercity 3700	Dordrecht – Rotterdam – The Hague HS – Leiden – Schiphol – Utrecht – 's-Hertogenbosch – Eindhoven – Venlo	NS VIRM	Evening and friday until sunday
Intercity 3900	Enkhuizen – Amsterdam – Utrecht – 's-Hertogenbosch – Eindhoven – Heerlen	NS VIRM	Monday–Thursday until 18:30
Intercity 21400	Tilburg – 's-Hertogenbosch	NS VIRM, Stadler FLIRT	One train on Friday and Saturday night
Intercity 21400	Utrecht – 's-Hertogenbosch – Eindhoven	NS VIRM, Stadler FLIRT	Friday and Saturday night
Sprinter 4400	(Oss –) 's-Hertogenbosch – Eindhoven – Deurne	Stadler FLIRT	—N/a
Sprinter 6000	Utrecht – Geldermalsen – 's-Hertogenbosch	Sprinter Lighttrain	—N/a
Sprinter 6600	Dordrecht – Breda – Tilburg – 's-Hertogenbosch – Nijmegen (– Arnhem)	Stadler FLIRT	—N/a

== Bus services ==
The station is served by city bus services (stadsbussen) as well as several regional bus services (streekbussen)

=== Stadsbussen ===
There are 13 city bus lines, which are all operated by Arriva. Hereby a rough schedule of the buses routes:

Line	Route	Frequency	Notes
1	Kruiskampsingel - De Kruiskamp - De Schutskamp - Deuteren - Boschveld - Centraal Station - Het Zand - Centrum Zuid - Zuid - Provinciehuis - Gestelsebuurt - Bazeldonk - Grevelingen - De Aawijk Zuid - Oosterplas	Regular service: 4x/hour, but only 2x/hour on evenings and Sundays; Holidays: 2x/hour, but 4x/hour FROM Centraal Station TO Kruiskampsingel on weekdays until +/- 1:30pm and FROM Kruiskampsingel TO Centraal Station on weekdays between +/- 1:30 pm and +/- 6:00pm and 4x/hour on the whole route on Saturdays, except evenings	On regular weekdays until +/- 1:45pm buses run only FROM Oosterplas TO Kruiskampsingel. At this moment the opposite direction is served by line 11 and buses arrive as line 11 at Oosterplas and continue as line 11 at Kruiskampsingel; On regular weekdays holidays from +/- 1:00pm until +/- 6:00pm buses run only FROM Kruiskampsingel TO Oosterplas. At this moment the opposite direction is served by line 11 and buses arrive as line 11 at Kruiskampsingel and continues as line 11 at Oosterplas; On weekdays during holidays from +/- 1:00pm until +/- 6:00pm buses run only FROM Kruiskampsingel TO Oosterplas and also 2x/hour FROM Centraal Station TO Kruiskampsingel. At these moments line 11 runs 2x/hour FROM Oosterplas TO Kruiskampsingel. Buses FROM Kruiskampsingel TO Oosterplas arrive as line 11 at Kruiskampsingel and continue as line 11 at Oosterplas
2	Centraal Station - Centrum Noord - De Muntel - De Vliert - Station Oost - De Buitenpepers Oost - De Slagen - De Haren - De Reit - De Donk Zuid - De Rompert Zuid - Rompertpassage	2x/hour	Not on evenings after 9:45pm; Arrives/Continues as line 12 at Rompertpassage
3	Centraal Station - Centrum Noord - De Hofstad - De Hinthamerpoort - Graafsebuurt - De Aawijk Noord - Hintham - Rosmalen, Molenhoek - Station Rosmalen - Rosmalen, Centrum - Rosmalen, Markt	2x/hour	No departure after 9:45pm; Arrives/Continues as line 13 at Rosmalen, Markt
4	Centraal Station - Het Zand - Centrum Zuid - Grevelingen - Station Oost - De Herven - Rosmalen, 't Ven	1x/hour	Weekdays rush hours only
5	Centraal Station - Boschveld - Deuteren - De Rietvelden - De Vutter - Engelen, Centrum - Engelen, De Haverleij	2x/hour	Only on weekdays rush hours and weekdays afternoons from +/- 3:15pm
6	Centraal Station -> Centrum Noord -> De Muntel -> Orthen Oost -> Rompertpassage -> De Rompert Zuid -> De Rompert Oost -> Abdijenbuurt Zuid -> Empel, Gewande -> Empel, Centrum -> Empel, Maasakker -> Abdijenbuurt Zuid -> De Rompert Oost -> De Rompert Zuid -> Rompertpassage -> Orthen Oost -> De Muntel -> Centrum Noord -> Centraal Station	2x/hour	Not on evenings after 9:45pm
7	Centraal Station - Orthenpoort - Orthen West - Noord - Maasvallei - Het Zilverpark - Maasoever	Outside holidays: 2x/hour, but 4x/hour during weekdays morning rush hours; Holidays: 2x/hour	Not on evenings and weekends
8	Maasoever - Het Zilverpark - Maasvallei - De Staatsliedenbuurt - Maasstroom - Lokeren - Maasdal - Abdijenbuurt West - De Rompert Oost - De Rompert Zuid - Rompertpassage - Orthen Oost - De Muntel - Centrum Noord - Centraal Station - Boschveld - Koning Willem I College - Paleiskwartier - Willemspoort - Jeroen Bosch Ziekenhuis - Vught, Taalstraat - Vught, Centrum Noord - Vught, Schoonveld - Vught, Vijverhof - Vught, Vijverbosweg	regular weekdays: 2x/hour, but only 1x/hour on evenings and Sundays; Holidays: 1x/hour, but 2x/hour on Saturdays, except evenings	Arrives/Continues as line 9 at Maasoever and Vught, Vijverbosweg; Combined quarter service with line 9 on section Maasoever-Vught, Taalstraat on weekdays outside holidays until +/- 6:45pm and Saturdays until +/- 5:45pm; Combined half-hourly service with line 9 on section Maasoever-Vught, Taalstraat on weekdays outside holidays after +/- 6:45pm, weekdays during holidays, Saturdays after +/- 5:45pm and Sundays
9	Vught, Vijverbosweg - Vught, De Vughtse Hoeven - Vught, De Baarzen - Vught, Centrum Zuid - Vught, Taalstraat - Jeroen Bosch Ziekenhuis - Willemspoort - Paleiskwartier - Koning Willem I College - Boschveld - Centraal Station - Centrum Noord - De Muntel - Orthen Oost - Rompertpassage - De Rompert Zuid - De Rompert Oost - Abdijenbuurt West - Maasdal - Lokeren - Maasstroom - De Staatsliedenbuurt - Maasvallei - Het Zilverpark - Maasoever	regular weekdays: 2x/hour, but only 1x/hour on evenings and Sundays; Holidays: 1x/hour, but 2x/hour on Saturdays, except evenings	Arrives/Continues as line 8 at Vught, Vijverbosweg and Maasoever; Combined quarter service with line 8 on section Vught, Taalstraat-Maasoever on weekdays outside holidays until +/- 6:45pm and Saturdays until +/- 5:45pm; Combined half-hourly service with line 8 on section Vught, Taalstraat-Maasoever on weekdays outside holidays after +/- 6:45pm, weekdays during holidays, Saturdays after +/- 5:45pm and Sundays
10	Centraal Station -> Centrum Noord -> Centrum Oost -> De Parade -> Centrum Zuid -> Centrum West -> Centraal Station	4x/hour	Only from +/- 9:00am until +/- 6:45pm
11	Oosterplas - De Aawijk Zuid - Grevelingen - Bazeldonk - Gestelsebuurt - Pettelaarpark - Transferium Pettelaar - Provinciehuis - Zuid - Centrum Zuid - Het Zand - Centraal Station - Boschveld - Deuteren - De Schutskamp - De Kruiskamp - Kruiskampsingel	Outside holidays: 4x/hour; Holidays: 2x/hour	Not on evenings, weekends and weekdays during holidays until +/- 1:30pm; On regular weekdays until +/- 1:30pm buses run only FROM Kruiskampsingel TO Oosterplas. At this moment the opposite direction is served by line 1 (with the exception of Pettelaarpark and Transferium Pettelaar which are skipped by this line) and buses arrive as line 1 at Kruiskampsingel and continue as line 1 at Oosterplas; On regular weekdays from +/- 1:30pm until +/- 6:50pm buses run only FROM Oosterplas TO Kruiskampsingel. At this moment the opposite direction is served by line 1 (with the exception of the Transferium Pettelaar and Pettelaarpark which are skipped by this line) and buses arrive as line 1 at Oosterplas and continues as line 1 at Kruiskampsingel; On weekdays during holidays from +/- 1:30pm until +/- 6:50pm buses run only FROM Oosterplas TO Kruiskampsingel. At this moment the opposite direction is served by line 1 (with the exception of the Transferium Pettelaar and Pettelaarpark which are skipped by this line) and buses arrive as line 1 at Oosterplas and continues as line 1 at Kruiskampsingel
12	Rompertpassage - De Hambaken - De Sprookjesbuurt - De Muziekinstrumentenbuurt - De Edelstenenbuurt - Orthen West - Orthenpoort - Centraal Station	2x/hour	Not on evenings after 9:45pm; Arrives/Continues as line 2 at Rompertpassage
13	Rosmalen, Markt - Rosmalen, De Overlaet - De Groote Wielen - De Brabantse Poort - De Haren - De Slagen - De Buitenpepers Oost - Station Oost - De Vliert - De Muntel - Centrum Noord - Centraal Station	2x/hour	Not on evenings after 9:45pm; Arrives/Continues as line 3 at Rosmalen, Markt

=== Streekbussen ===
Line	Route	Frequency	Notes
90	's-Hertogenbosch, Centraal Station - 's-Hertogenbosch, Orthenpoort - 's-Hertogenbosch, De Vliert - 's-Hertogenbosch, Transferium De Vliert - 's-Hertogenbosch, Stadion De Vliert (FC Den Bosch soccer stadium) - 's-Hertogenbosch, Hintham - Rosmalen - Rosmalen, Maliskamp - Kruisstraat - Nuland - Geffen - Heesch - Heesch, Stationsplein - Zevenbergen - Schaijk - Reek - Velp - Grave	Outside holidays: 2x/hour, but only 1x/hour Heesch, Stationsplein-Grave outside weekdays morning rush hours and 1x/hour on the whole route at evenings and weekends; Holidays: 1x/hour	Not on evenings after +/- 9:15pm; On weekdays outside rush hours the route of this line is split up into two separate sections: 's-Hertogenbosch, Centraal Station-Heesch, Stationsplein and Heesch, Stationsplein-Grave. At these moments transfer between the two sections is provided at Heesch, Stationsplein; The section Heesch, Stationsplein-Grave is not served on evenings and weekends
135	's-Hertogenbosch, Centraal Station - 's-Hertogenbosch, Boschveld - 's-Hertogenbosch, Koning Willem I College - 's-Hertogenbosch, Paleiskwartier - 's-Hertogenbosch, Willemspoort - 's-Hertogenbosch, Jeroen Bosch Ziekenhuis - 's-Hertogenbosch, Helftheuvelweg - Vlijmen - Haarsteeg - Hedikhuizen - Herpt - Heusden - Oud-Heusden - Wijk en Aalburg, Kromme Nol busstation - Wijk en Aalburg	Outside holidays: 4x/hour, but only 3x/hour 's-Hertogenbosch, Helftheuvelweg-Vlijmen-Haarsteeg-Hedikhuizen-Herpt-Heusden-Oud-Heusden-Wijk en Aalburg, Kromme Nol busstation, 1x/hour express service 's-Hertogenbosch, Helftheuvelweg-Wijk en Aalburg, Kromme Nol busstation and 1x/hour on the whole route on evenings and weekends; Holidays: 2x/hour, but only 1x/hour on evenings and weekends	On weekdays outside holidays, except evenings buses run 1x/hour as express service on section 's-Hertogenbosch, Helftheuvelweg-Wijk en Aalburg, Kromme Nol busstation, skipping all stops along the way. These express buses arrive/continue as line 121 to/from Wijk en Aalburg, Veen, Andel, Giessen, Rijswijk, Woudrichem, Oudendijk, Sleeuwijk, Gorinchem and Station Gorinchem at Wijk en Aalburg, Kromme Nol busstation; On weekdays during holidays, except evenings and Saturdays, except evenings, buses arrive/continue 1x/hour as line 121 to/from Wijk en Aalburg, Veen, Andel, Giessen, Rijswijk, Woudrichem, Oudendijk, Sleeuwijk, Gorinchem and Station Gorinchem at Wijk en Aalburg, Kromme Nol busstation; The section Wijk en Aalburg, Kromme Nol busstation-Wijk en Aalburg is only served on evenings and Sundays, when line 121 does not run on this section
136	's-Hertogenbosch, Centraal Station - 's-Hertogenbosch, Boschveld - 's-Hertogenbosch, Koning Willem I College - 's-Hertogenbosch, Paleiskwartier - 's-Hertogenbosch, Willemspoort - 's-Hertogenbosch, Jeroen Bosch Ziekenhuis - 's-Hertogenbosch, Helftheuvelweg - Vlijmen - Nieuwkuijk - Drunen - Waalwijk - Waalwijk, Vredesplein busstation - Sprang Capelle - Kaatsheuvel - De Efteling - Loon op Zand - Tilburg - Station Tilburg	Outside holidays: 2x/hour, but 4x/hour Station 's-Hertogenbosch, Centraal Station-Waalwijk, Vredesplein busstation during weekdays rush hours, only 1x/hour Waalwijk, Vredesplein busstation-Station Tilburg on evenings and Saturdays and only 1x/hour on the whole route on Sundays; Holidays: 1x/hour, but 2x/hour during weekdays rush hours and 2x/hour Waalwijk, Vredesplein busstation-Station 's-Hertogenbosch on Saturdays, except evenings	On Saturday evenings, the last 2 buses FROM 's-Hertogenbosch TO Tilburg continue further to Tilburg, Interpolis after Station Tilburg and end there
140	's-Hertogenbosch, Centraal Station - Vught - Vught, Taalstraat - Vught, Centrum Noord - Helvoirt - Haaren - Station Oisterwijk - Oisterwijk - Berkel-Enschot - Tilburg - Station Tilburg	Outside holidays: 1x/hour, but 2x/hour on weekdays rush hours and weekdays afternoons from +/- 2:00pm until evening rush hours; Holidays: 1x/hour	
156	's-Hertogenbosch, Centraal Station - 's-Hertogenbosch, Het Zand - 's-Hertogenbosch, Centrum Zuid - 's-Hertogenbosch, Zuid - 's-Hertogenbosch, Provinciehuis - Sint-Michielsgestel - Schijndel - Sint Oedenrode - Sint Oedenrode, Corridor - Nijnsel - Son - Eindhoven - Station Eindhoven	Outside holidays: 2x/hour, but 4x/hour Sint Oedenrode, Corridor-Station Eindhoven during weekdays rush hours, 1x/hour 's-Hertogenbosch, Centraal Station-Sint Oedenrode, Corridor on evenings until +/- 9:00pm and Saturdays and 1x/hour on the whole route on evenings after +/- 9:00pm and Sundays; Holidays: 1x/hour, but 2x/hour Sint Oedenrode, Corridor-Station Eindhoven during weekdays rush hours and on Saturdays until +/- 9:00pm	
158	's-Hertogenbosch, Centraal Station - 's-Hertogenbosch, Orthenpoort - 's-Hertogenbosch, De Vliert - 's-Hertogenbosch, Transferium De Vliert - 's-Hertogenbosch, Stadion De Vliert (FC Den Bosch soccer stadium) - 's-Hertogenbosch, Hintham - Rosmalen - Rosmalen, Maliskamp – Berlicum – Middelrode – Heeswijk-Dinther – Veghel – Veghel, Busstation	Outside holidays: 2x/hour, but 4x/hour during weekdays rush hours and only 1x/hour on evenings after +/- 9:15pm, Saturdays after +/- 5:15pm and Sundays; Holidays: 2x/hour, but only 1x/hour on evenings after +/- 9:15pm, Saturdays after +/- 5:15pm and Sundays	
159	's-Hertogenbosch, Centraal Station - 's-Hertogenbosch, Het Zand - 's-Hertogenbosch, Centrum Zuid - 's-Hertogenbosch, Zuid - 's-Hertogenbosch, Bazeldonk – 's-Hertogenbosch, De Brand - Den Dungen – Sint-Michielsgestel – Schijndel – Wijbosch – Eerde – Veghel – Veghel, Busstation	1x/hour	's-Hertogenbosch, De Brand is only served during weekdays rush hours in the peak direction: 3 buses FROM 's-Hertogenbosch TO Veghel at morning rush hours and also 3 buses FROM Veghel TO 's-Hertogenbosch at evening rush hours; At weekdays outside holidays the first bus FROM 's-Hertogenbosch TO Veghel continues to Veghel, De Muntelaar after Veghel, Busstation and ends there
165	's-Hertogenbosch, Centraal Station - 's-Hertogenbosch, Orthenpoort – 's-Hertogenbosch, Orthen West – Hedel – Velddriel – Kerkdriel – Alem – Rossum – Rossum, De Vaste Burcht – Heerewaarden – Dreumel – Wamel – Beneden-Leeuwen – Boven-Leeuwen – Puiflijk – Druten	2x/hour, but only 1x/hour on evenings and Sundays	During weekdays rush hours outside holidays one extra bus runs FROM Druten TO 's-Hertogenbosch, Centraal Station during morning rush hours and one extra bus FROM Rossum, De Vaste Burcht TO Druten during evening rush hours; On evenings until +/- 8:00pm, except Sunday evenings, buses continue to run 2x/hour FROM Druten TO Rossum, De Vaste Burcht and from there 1x/hour to 's-Hertogenbosch, Centraal Station
166	's-Hertogenbosch, Centraal Station - 's-Hertogenbosch, Orthenpoort – 's-Hertogenbosch, Orthen West – Hedel – Ammerzoden – Well	1x/hour, but 2x/hour during weekdays morning rush hours	
203	's-Hertogenbosch, Centraal Station - 's-Hertogenbosch, Boschveld - 's-Hertogenbosch, Koning Willem I College - 's-Hertogenbosch, Paleiskwartier - 's-Hertogenbosch, Willemspoort - 's-Hertogenbosch, Jeroen Bosch Ziekenhuis – Vught – Vught, Stadhouderspark – Vught, Villapark West – Vught, Vijverbosweg - Esch – Boxtel – Station Boxtel – Liempde	1x/hour	Not on evenings and Sundays
213	's-Hertogenbosch, Centraal Station -> 's-Hertogenbosch, Boschveld -> 's-Hertogenbosch, Koning Willem I College -> 's-Hertogenbosch, Paleiskwartier -> 's-Hertogenbosch, Willemspoort -> 's-Hertogenbosch, Jeroen Bosch Ziekenhuis –> Cromvoirt –> Vught –> Vught, Kazerne –> Vught, Woonoord Lunetten -> Vught, Kazerne -> Vught, Villapark West -> Vught, Vijverbosweg -> Vught, Vijverhof -> Vught, Villapark Oost -> Vught, Kazerne -> Vught, Woonoord Lunetten -> Vught, Kazerne -> Vught -> Cromvoirt -> 's-Hertogenbosch, Jeroen Bosch Ziekenhuis -> 's-Hertogenbosch, Willemspoort -> 's-Hertogenbosch, Paleiskwartier -> 's-Hertogenbosch, Koning Willem I College -> 's-Hertogenbosch, Boschveld -> 's-Hertogenbosch, Centraal Station	1x/hour	Not on evenings and Sundays
239	's-Hertogenbosch, Centraal Station - 's-Hertogenbosch, Boschveld - 's-Hertogenbosch, Koning Willem I College - 's-Hertogenbosch, Paleiskwartier - 's-Hertogenbosch, Willemspoort - 's-Hertogenbosch, Jeroen Bosch Ziekenhuis – Cromvoirt – Nieuwkuijk – Helvoirt – Biezenmortel – Udenhout	1x/hour	Not on evenings and Sundays
300	's-Hertogenbosch, Centraal Station - 's-Hertogenbosch, Boschveld - 's-Hertogenbosch, Koning Willem I College - 's-Hertogenbosch, Paleiskwartier – Waalwijk - Waalwijk, Vredesplein busstation – Sprang-Capelle – Kaatsheuvel – De Efteling – Loon op Zand – Tilburg – Station Tilburg	Outside holidays: 2x/hour, but 4x/hour 's-Hertogenbosch, Centraal Station-Waalwijk, Vredesplein busstation on weekdays rush hours and weekdays afternoons from +/- 3:00 pm until evening rush hours; Holidays: 2x/hour	Volans; Not on weekdays after 9:15 pm, Saturday afternoons after 5:15pm and Sundays. At these moments this line is replaced by line 302
301	's-Hertogenbosch, Centraal Station - 's-Hertogenbosch, Boschveld - 's-Hertogenbosch, Koning Willem I College - 's-Hertogenbosch, Paleiskwartier – Vlijmen – Drunen - Waalwijk - Waalwijk, Vredesplein busstation – Sprang-Capelle – Kaatsheuvel – Tilburg – Station Tilburg	Outside holidays: 2x/hour, but 4x/hour on weekdays rush hours and weekdays afternoons from +/- 2:30 pm until evening rush hours; Holidays: 2x/hour	Volans; Not on weekdays after 9:30pm, Saturday afternoons after 5:00pm and Sundays. At these moments this line is replaced by line 302
302	's-Hertogenbosch, Centraal Station - 's-Hertogenbosch, Boschveld - 's-Hertogenbosch, Koning Willem I College - 's-Hertogenbosch, Paleiskwartier – Vlijmen – Drunen - Waalwijk - Waalwijk, Vredesplein busstation – Sprang-Capelle – Kaatsheuvel – De Efteling – Loon op Zand – Tilburg – Station Tilburg	2x/hour	Volans; Only at weekdays after 9:30pm, Saturday afternoons after 5:30pm and Sundays; Replaces lines 300 and 301, who do not run when this line runs
306	's-Hertogenbosch, Centraal Station - 's-Hertogenbosch, Het Zand - 's-Hertogenbosch, Centrum Zuid - 's-Hertogenbosch, Zuid – 's-Hertogenbosch, Provinciehuis – Sint-Michielsgestel – Schijndel – Wijbosch – Eerde – Veghel – Veghel, Busstation – Veghel, De Muntelaar – Uden	Outside holidays: 2x/hour, but 4x/hour during weekdays rush hours; Holidays: 2x/hour	Volans
639	's-Hertogenbosch, Centraal Station - 's-Hertogenbosch, Boschveld - 's-Hertogenbosch, Koning Willem I College - 's-Hertogenbosch, Paleiskwartier – 's-Hertogenbosch, Jeroen Bosch Ziekenhuis - Helvoirt – Biezenmortel – Udenhout	2x/day	Only during weekdays rush hours, outside holidays; During morning rush hours buses run only FROM Udenhout TO 's-Hertogenbosch; During evening rush hours buses run only FROM 's-Hertogenbosch TO Udenhout
643	's-Hertogenbosch, Centraal Station - 's-Hertogenbosch, Boschveld - 's-Hertogenbosch, Koning Willem I College - 's-Hertogenbosch, Paleiskwartier – 's-Hertogenbosch, Jeroen Bosch Ziekenhuis – Vught – Vught, Stadhouderspark – Vught, Villapark West – Vught, Vijverbosweg – Esch – Boxtel – Station Boxtel	1x/day	Only during weekdays rush hours, outside holidays; During morning rush hours buses run only FROM Boxtel TO 's-Hertogenbosch; During evening rush hours buses run only FROM 's-Hertogenbosch TO Boxtel
662	's-Hertogenbosch, Centraal Station - 's-Hertogenbosch, Orthenpoort - 's-Hertogenbosch, De Vliert – 's-Hertogenbosch, Station Oost – 's-Hertogenbosch, De Buitenpepers Oost – 's-Hertogenbosch, De Slagen – 's-Hertogenbosch, Rompertpassage – 's-Hertogenbosch, De Rompert Zuid – 's-Hertogenbosch, De Rompert Oost – 's-Hertogenbosch, Abdijenbuurt Zuid – Empel - Empel, Maasakker (morning rush hours only)/Empel, Gewande (evening rush hours only) – Empel, Centrum – Maren-Kessel – Maren Kessel, Kerkplein - Lith – Lithoijen – Teeffelen – Oss – Station Oss	1x/hour	Only on weekdays, outside holidays, during weekdays rush hours and weekdays afternoons from +/- 1:10pm; During morning rush hours buses run FROM Maren-Kessel, Kerkplein TO Oss and FROM Oss TO 's-Hertogenbosch and do not serve Empel, Gewande; During weekdays afternoons from +/- 1:10 pm and evening rush hours buses run BETWEEN Oss AND Maren-Kessel, Kerkplein and FROM 's-Hertogenbosch TO Maren-Kessel, Kerkplein and do not serve Empel, Maasakker. A transfer between the buses FROM 's-Hertogenbosch TO Maren Kessel, Kerkplein section and the buses FROM Maren-Kessel, Kerkplein TO Oss is offered at Maren-Kessel, Kerkplein
665	's-Hertogenbosch, Centraal Station - 's-Hertogenbosch, Orthenpoort – 's-Hertogenbosch, De Buitenpepers West – 's-Hertogenbosch, Orthen Oost – Hedel – Velddriel – Kerkdriel – Alem – Rossum – Rossum, De Vaste Burcht – Heerewaarden – Dreumel	4x/day, but only 2x/day Rossum, De Vaste Burcht-Dreumel	Only on weekdays, outside holidays, during weekdays rush hours in the peak direction; During morning rush hours 2 buses run FROM Dreumel TO 's-Hertogenbosch and 2 other buses FROM Rossum, De Vaste Burcht TO 's-Hertogenbosch; During weekdays evening rush hours 2 buses run FROM 's-Hertogenbosch TO Dreumel and 2 other buses FROM 's-Hertogenbosch TO Rossum, De Vaste Burcht
666	Well -> Ammerzoden -> Hedel -> 's-Hertogenbosch, Orthen Oost -> 's-Hertogenbosch, De Buitenpepers West -> 's-Hertogenbosch, Orthenpoort -> 's-Hertogenbosch, Centraal Station	1x/day	Weekdays morning rush hours, outside holidays, only
800	's-Hertogenbosch, Centraal Station – De Efteling	2x/hour	Efteling Express-service; At weekday mornings during holidays and Saturday mornings only from 9:00am until 11:30am and only FROM 's-Hertogenbosch TO De Efteling; At Sunday mornings only from 9:30am until 11:45am and only FROM 's-Hertogenbosch TO De Efteling; At weekdays afternoons and weekdays evenings during holidays and Saturday afternoons and weekend evenings only from 16:30pm until 20:30pm and only FROM De Efteling TO 's-Hertogenbosch; At some Saturday evenings during Summer holidays when De Efteling is opened the whole evening buses run the whole evening until +/- 12:30am, but only FROM De Efteling TO 's-Hertogenbosch

== Gallery ==
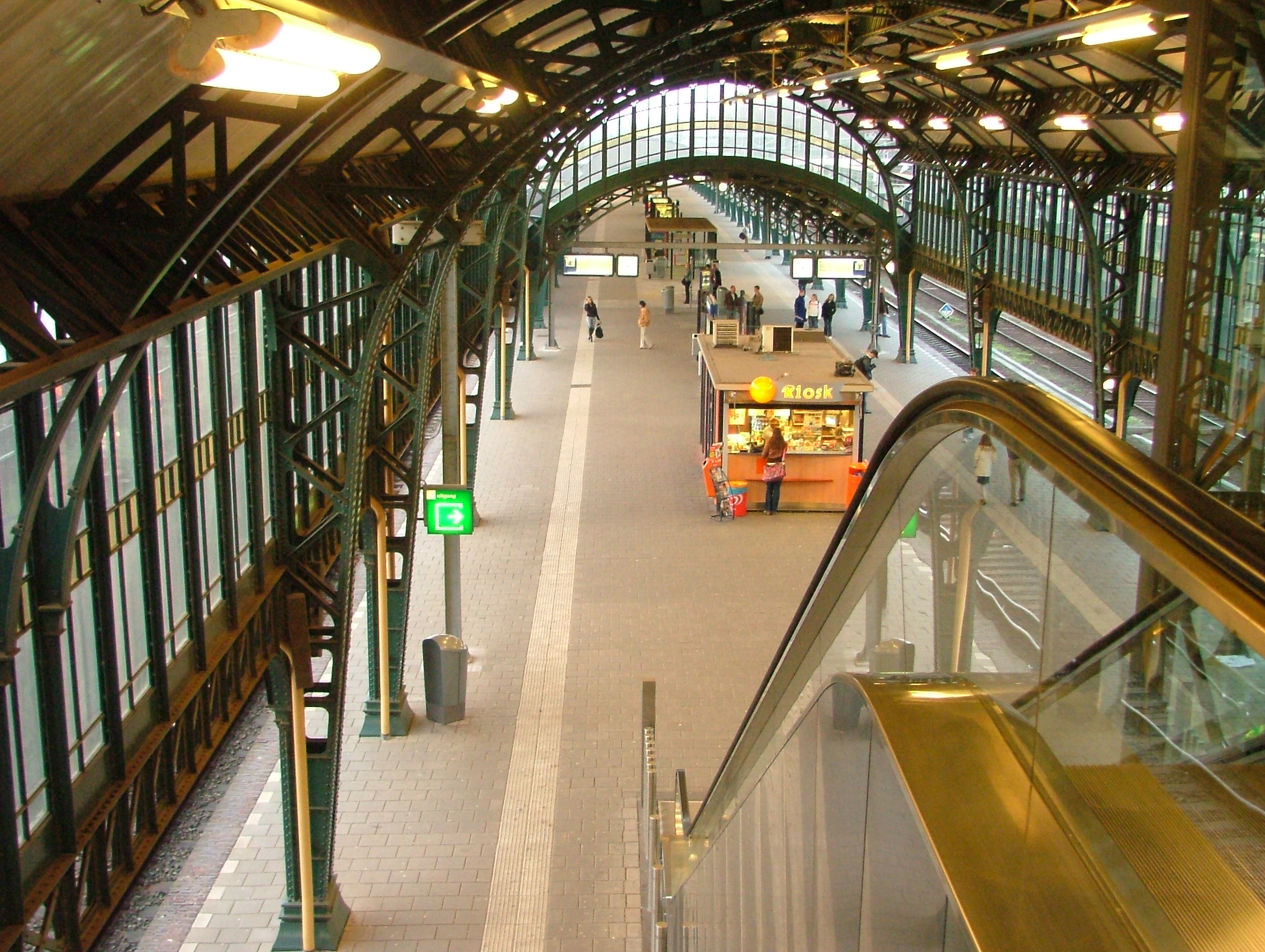
The platform roof, restored from the 2nd station building era
