= Breda–Eindhoven railway =

Railway line in the Netherlands

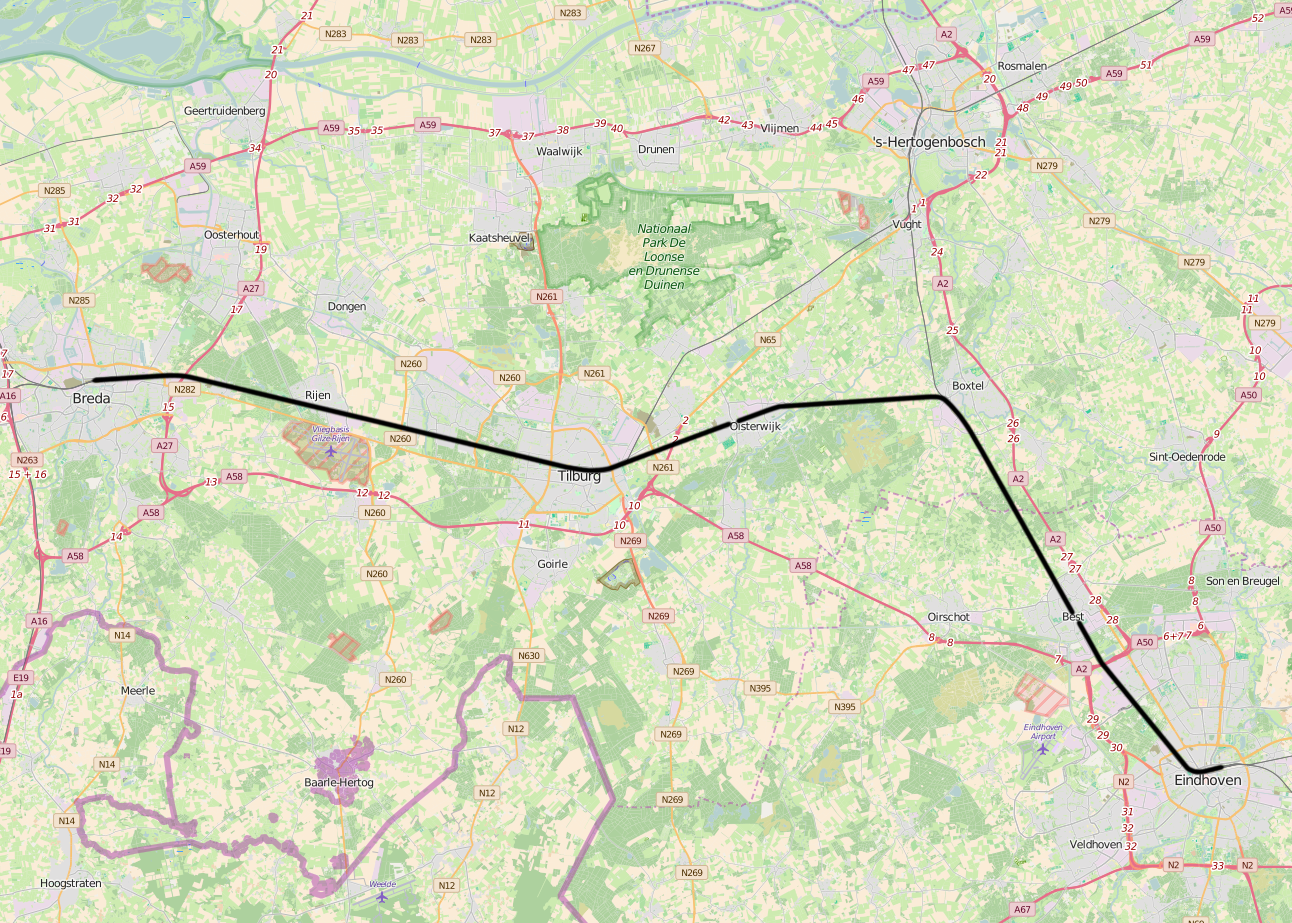

Overview
- Status: Operational
- Locale: Netherlands
- Termini: Breda railway station; Eindhoven railway station

Service
- Operator: Nederlandse Spoorwegen

History
- Opened: 1863–1866

Technical
- Line length: 59 km (37 mi)
- Number of tracks: Double track (Breda–Boxtel), four tracks (Boxtel–Eindhoven)
- Track gauge: 1,435 mm (4 ft 8 1/2 in) standard gauge
- Electrification: 1.5 kV DC

The Breda–Eindhoven railway is an important railway line in the Netherlands running from Breda railway station to Eindhoven railway station, passing through Tilburg railway station and Boxtel railway station. The line was opened between 1863 and 1866. It is part of the Staatslijn "E".

== Stations ==
The main interchange stations on the Breda–Eindhoven railway are:

- Breda: to Roosendaal and Rotterdam
- Tilburg: to 's-Hertogenbosch and Nijmegen
- Boxtel: to 's-Hertogenbosch
- Eindhoven: to 's-Hertogenbosch, Utrecht, Venlo and Maastricht
