= Tilburg Universiteit railway station =

Railway station in the Netherlands

Tilburg Universiteit
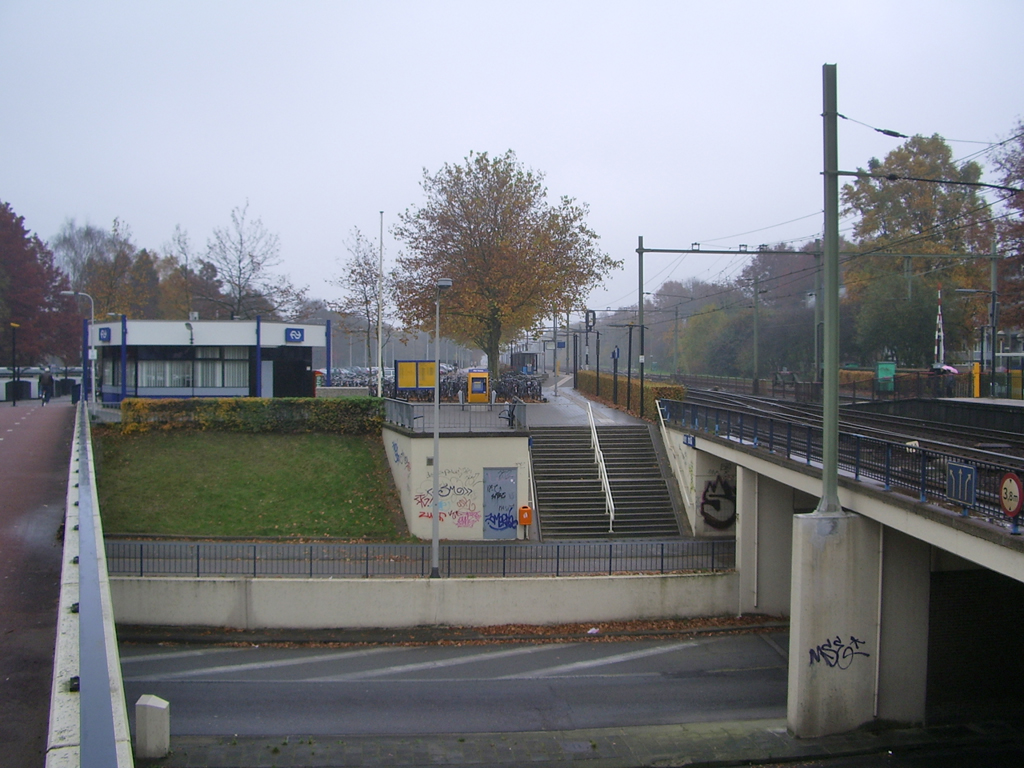

General information
- Location: Netherlands
- Coordinates: 51°33′55″N 5°3′5″E
- Line: Breda–Eindhoven railway

History
- Opened: 1969

Services
Preceding station	Nederlandse Spoorwegen	Following station
Terminus	NS Sprinter 6400	Tilburg towards Weert
Tilburg Reeshof towards Dordrecht	NS Sprinter 6600 Mon-Sat until 19:00	Tilburg towards Arnhem Centraal
Tilburg Reeshof towards Dordrecht	NS Sprinter 6600 After 19:00 and Sun	Tilburg towards Nijmegen
Location
- Location within Netherlands

Tilburg Universiteit (English: Tilburg University) is a railway station located in Tilburg, Netherlands. It is situated on the Breda–Eindhoven railway. Opened as Tilburg West in 1969, it was renamed after the nearby Tilburg University in 2010. The train services are operated by Nederlandse Spoorwegen.

== Train service ==
The following services currently call at Tilburg Universiteit:

- 2x per hour local services (sprinter) Tilburg Universiteit - Eindhoven
- 2x per hour local services (sprinter) Arnhem Centraal - 's-Hertogenbosch - Tilburg - Breda

== Bus service ==
The station is served by the following city bus line, operated by Arriva:

Line	Route	Frequency	Notes
2	Middeldijkdreef - Reeshof Noord - Reeshof Oost - Paletplein - Wandelbos Zuid - Het Zand Zuid - Station Universiteit - Centraal Station - Centrum	Outside holidays: 4x/hour, but 6x/hour on weekdays rush hours and weekdays afternoons from +/- 2:00pm until evening rush hours, but only 2x/hour on evenings and Sundays; Holidays: 2x/hour, but 4x/hour during weekdays rush hours, on weekdays afternoons from +/- 2:00pm until evening rush hours and Saturdays outside evenings	Arrives/Continues as line 4 at Middeldijkdreef
