= Breda Oost railway station =

Railway station in the Netherlands

Breda Oost

General information
- Location: Netherlands
- Coordinates: 51°35′48″N 4°48′38″E
- Line: Staatslijn E (Breda–Maastricht)
Location
- Location within Netherlands

Breda Oost is a proposed railway station in Breda, Netherlands.

== History ==
The station is set to open sometime after 2020. The station lies on the Staatslijn E (Breda - Maastricht) and is located between Breda and Gilze-Rijen. The station is primarily for eastern Breda and small settlements in the area. It is still unknown when construction work will begin. The station plan has been accepted.

== Train services ==
The following train service may call at the station:

Series	Train Type	Route	Material	Notes
13600	Sprinter	's-Hertogenbosch - Tilburg - Tilburg Universiteit - Tilburg Reeshof - Gilze-Rijen - Breda Oost - Breda	DD-AR / SGMm	

== Bus service ==
No information is known at present of any bus services

Bus Service	Operator	From	To	Via	Frequency
