= StadsHeer =

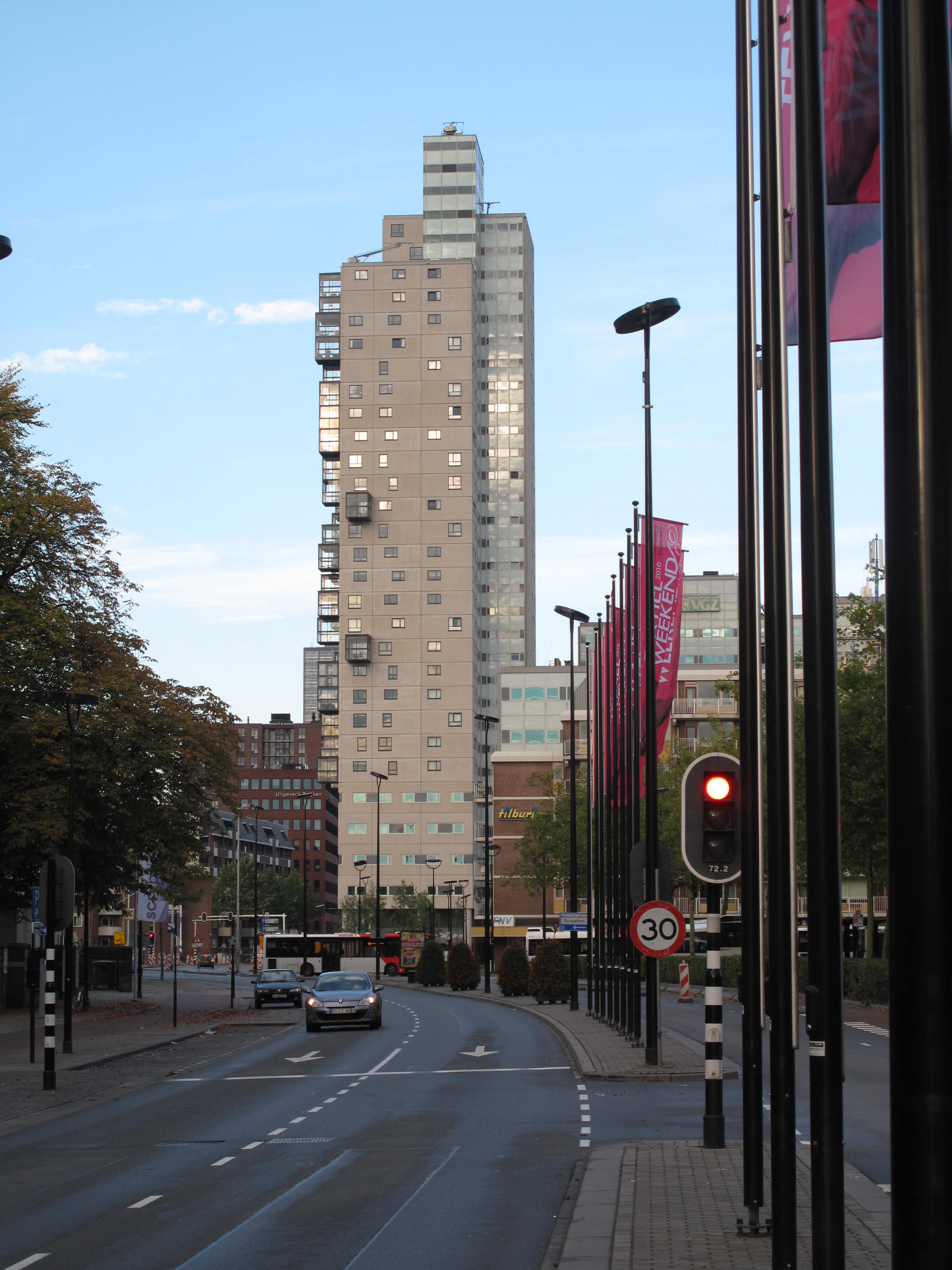
- The StadsHeer in 2010

- Location within North Brabant

General information
- Status: In use
- Type: Residential and office building
- Location: 303 Spoorlaan, Tilburg
- Coordinates: 51°33′37″N 5°4′42″E
- Construction started: March 2005
- Topped-out: 12 September 2006
- Completed: 26 March 2007
- Owner: Amvest

Height
- Height: 101 m (331 ft)

Technical details
- Material: Concrete
- Floor count: 31 (and one underground)

Design and construction
- Architecture firm: EGM Architecten
- Developer: BAM Vastgoed
- Main contractor: BAM Woningbouw

The StadsHeer is a building in the neighborhood Haestrechtkwartier in the Dutch city of Tilburg. The building is 101 metres (331 feet) tall and has 31 above ground floors. Therefore, it is the second tallest building in Tilburg after Westpoint Tower. The lower six floors are occupied by offices and the upper 25 floors by 85 rental apartment units.

== Construction ==
Before the StadsHeer existed, the space was occupied by facilities of the railroad through Tilburg. This railway area was later converted into the residential neighborhood Haestrechtkwartier, in which the StadsHeer is situated. BAM Vastgoed was the developer of the building and sold it halfway 2004 to Amvest, that wanted to both lease some of the apartments and sell some of them. Eventually, Amvest decided to lease all of the apartments. BAM Vastgoed wanted to sell the building, because it could not find enough buyers for the apartments. At that time, VGZ had an option on the office space. EGM Architecten had been chosen to design the building and BAM Woningbouw was the main contractor. The firm Hurks, that had been involved in the project since 2002, made the constructive design. At first, the StadsHeer was planned as a poured concrete building 89 metres (292 feet) high. In the end, it was built from prefabricated materials and reached a height of 101 metres (331 feet).

The construction work for the StadsHeer began in March 2005. The signs of the project were revealed and the flags were lifted in the presence of alderman E. Aarts on December 22 of that same year. During the construction, adding one office floor took two weeks and adding one residential floor took a week at the most. From June 2006 onwards, people could register themselves as future tenants. An event for potential tenants was organized before that month in March of that year. At the end of September, a model apartment on the 22nd floor was furbished. The StadsHeer was topped out on September 12, 2006 in the presence of alderman C.J.M. Aarts-Engbers. Also, two future tenants abseiled from the top of the StadsHeer.

When the building was still under construction, a restaurant named "Skylinerestaurant De StadsHeer" operated between January 8 and March 5, 2007 in one of the penthouses of the building. The restaurant, that was meant to attract new tenants, was established by owner Amvest and the Bonheur Horeca Groep. The restaurant closed when the opening of the building was nearby. The construction ended on March 26, 2007. At that moment, 50% of the apartments had been leased. In May that percentage had risen to 70. The StadsHeer faced vacancy since its opening: at the start of 2014 almost twenty apartments weren't leased. After the prices had been dropped, nine apartments were vacant in May of the same year.

== Architecture ==
The StadsHeer has been built using concrete prefabricated elements, that are connected to each other by the floors. The elements were equipped with pipes before being placed. The construction took less time and was cheaper because of the use of prefabrication. The foundation is situated beneath the prefabricated parts and consists of vibro piles and a foundation plate on top of it. The StadsHeer has a sandwich facade and a whitish exterior. Cuboid-shaped sunrooms are situated on the exterior of the building, that are characteristic for the building and are popularly called "vogelkooikes" (Dutch for "small bird cages"). The sunrooms are hanging on the facade using a fast click system and have aluminium curtain walls. Every apartment except for the penthouses has one such sunroom. The penthouses have sunrooms as well, but they're not hanging on the facade.

== Layout ==
The lower six floors are used as offices and the 25 floors situated above them contain rental apartments. Beneath the 31 above ground floors, there's a basement with technical equipment and storage space. The offices have a total floor area of around 2,500 m^{2} (26,910 sq ft) and are leased by VGZ. The 85 apartment units are leased by Amvest. There are four types of three room apartments (124.5 m^{2} (1,340 sq ft) - 144 m^{2} (1,550 sq ft)), two types of four room apartments (124.5 m^{2} (1,340 sq ft) - 144 m^{2} (1,550 sq ft)), and besides there's one type of penthouse (approximately 200 m^{2} (2,153 sq ft)). There are a total of seventy of the former, twelve of the second and three of the latter. The three upper floors each contain one penthouse.
