= Ron Heeren =

Dutch mass spectrometry researcher

Ron M.A. Heeren
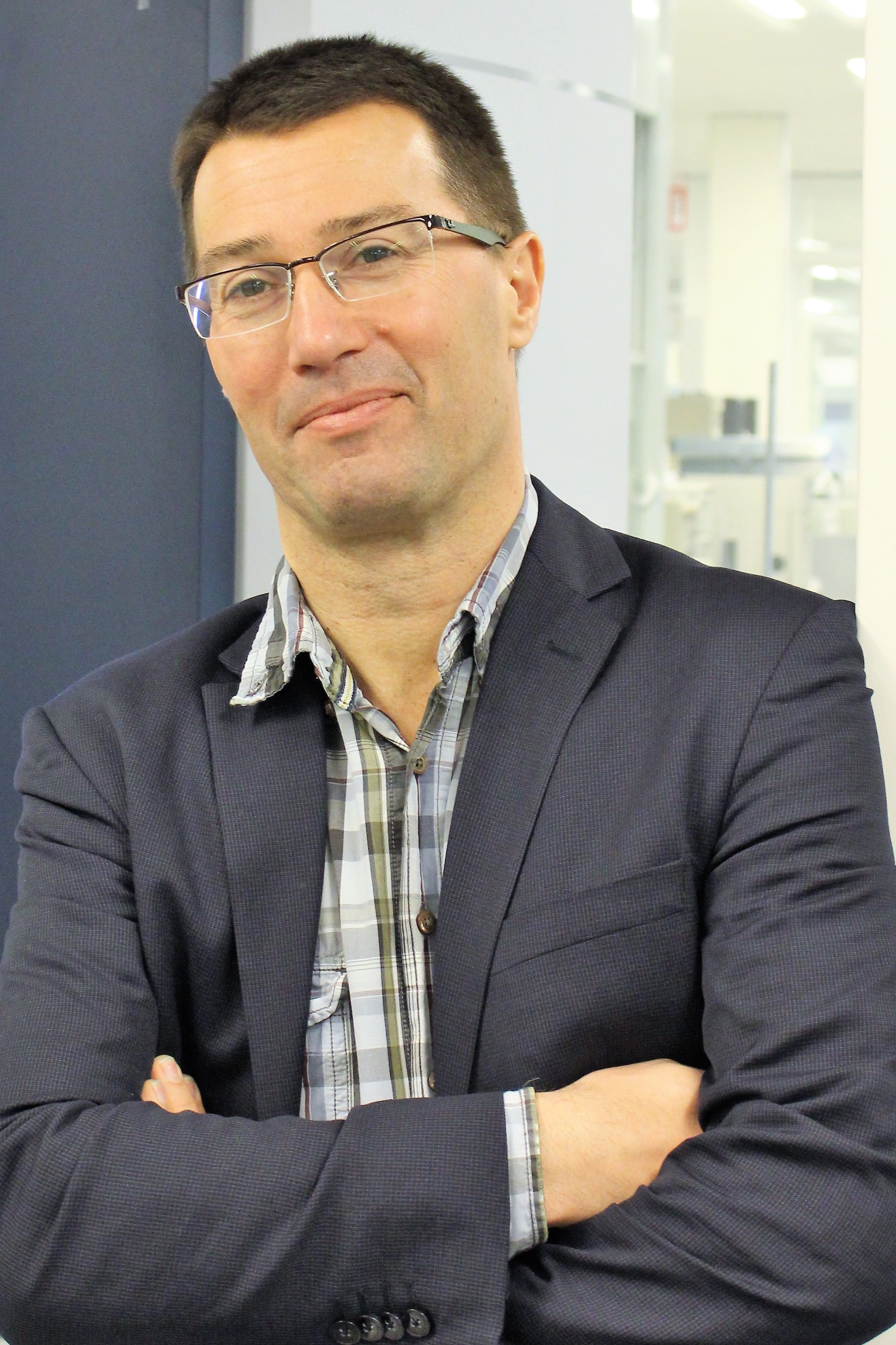
- Ron Heeren in 2017
- Born: 1965 (age 60–61); Tilburg, Netherlands
- Education: University of Amsterdam
- Awards: Hans Fisher Fellowship; Thomson Medal of IMSF; NWO-Physics Valorisation Prize; Brightlands Convention Award; Robert Feulgen lecturer, Society for Histochemistry; Distinguished Wiley Visiting Scientist award;
- Scientific career
- Fields: Imaging Mass Spectrometry

Ron M.A. Heeren (born 1965, Tilburg) is a Dutch scientist in mass spectrometry imaging. He is currently a distinguished professor at Maastricht University and the scientific director of the Multimodal Molecular Imaging Institute (M4I), where he heads the division of Imaging Mass Spectrometry.

== Scientific career ==
Heeren obtained a PhD degree in Technical Physics at the University of Amsterdam in 1992 under the supervision of Aart Kleyn.

He led a FOM-AMOLF research group on macromolecular ion physics and biomolecular imaging mass spectrometry (1995–2014). He was also professor at the chemistry faculty of Utrecht University in 2001–2019.

Between 1995 and 2015, he worked on new approaches toward high spatial resolution and high-throughput molecular imaging mass spectrometry using secondary ion mass spectrometry (SIMS) and matrix-assisted laser desorption and ionization (MALDI).

Heeren has coauthored over 300 peer-reviewed articles, which have been cited over 12,600 times (Google Scholar).

== Research ==
Heeren’s academic research interests are fundamental studies of the energetics of macromolecular systems, conformational studies of non-covalently bound protein complexes, translational imaging research, high-throughput bioinformatics, and the development and validation of new mass spectrometry–based proteomic imaging techniques for the life sciences.

During his postdoctoral fellowship, he worked on the development of innovative ion sources, vacuums systems, data acquisition systems and novel temperature-controlled ion cyclotron resonance cells. He used the FTICR-MS instrument for the study of collisional energy transfer and internal energy distributions. These methods were deployed to investigate their role in the determination of dissociation pathways of biomolecular systems.

As a project leader (1995–1997), Heeren led the application of high-resolution MS (FTICR-MS, FTIR imaging spectroscopy and SIMS) to the field of conservation science. He discovered and identified saponified pigment particulates in so-called protrusions in Rembrandt’s “The Anatomy Lesson of Dr. Nicolaes Tulp” in collaboration with the Mauritshuis museum in The Hague.

Heeren and his group have pioneered the development of active pixelated detectors for mass spectrometry imaging. One such detector, the Medipix detector has been adapted to enable microscope-mode imaging mass spectrometry for biomolecules to enable combined high-throughput and high-resolution molecular imaging using MALDI and SIMS.

== Professional activities ==
From 2008 to 2013, Heeren was the research director for emerging technologies at the Netherlands Proteomics Centre. In 2014, he was appointed to his current position as one of the scientific directors of M4I at Maastricht University. He was president of the Dutch Society of Mass Spectrometry between 2001–2005. He is one of the founding members of the Mass Spectrometry Imaging Society, and was elected its president in 2017.

== Commercialization ==
Heeren holds 7 patents and has established two spin-off companies, Omics2Image/ASI and the Dutch Screening Group. In 2019, he was awarded the NWO Valorisation Prize in Physics.

== Awards ==
- 2020 Hans Fisher Senior Fellowship, Institute of Advanced Studies, Technical University of Munich Hans Fisher senior fellowship
- 2020 Thomson medal, International Mass Spectrometry Foundation for distinguished contribution to international MS
- 2019 NWO-Physics Valorisation prize (see above)
- 2019 Brightlands Convention Award
- 2014 Robert Feulgen lecturer, Society for Histochemistry
- 2013 Winner, 10th Venture Challenge, Netherlands Genomics Initiative
- 2012 Award, Exploratory Measurement Science Group (EMSG), University of Edinburgh, UK
- 2010 Distinguished Wiley Visiting Scientist award, Environmental Molecular Sciences Laboratory, Department of Energy, US
- 2008 RCM Beynon Prize, Rapid Communications in Mass Spectrometry
- 2002 Bert L. Schram Award, Dutch Society for Mass Spectrometry (NVMS)

== Most cited publications ==
1. Ščupáková, Klára; Dewez, Frédéric; Walch, Axel K.; Heeren, Ron M. A.; Balluff, Benjamin (2020-08-17). "Morphometric Cell Classification for Single-Cell MALDI-Mass Spectrometry Imaging". Angewandte Chemie International Edition. 59 (40): 17447–17450. doi:10.1002/anie.202007315. ISSN 1433-7851. PMC 7540554. PMID 32668069.
2. Ellis, Shane R.; Paine, Martin R. L.; Eijkel, Gert B.; Pauling, Josch K.; Husen, Peter; Jervelund, Mark W.; Hermansson, Martin; Ejsing, Christer S.; Heeren, Ron M. A. (2018-05-21). "Automated, parallel mass spectrometry imaging and structural identification of lipids". Nature Methods. 15 (7): 515–518. doi:10.1038/s41592-018-0010-6. ISSN 1548-7091. PMID 29786091. S2CID 29162438.
3. Bruinen, Anne L.; Fisher, Gregory L.; Balez, Rachelle; van der Sar, Astrid M.; Ooi, Lezanne; Heeren, Ron M. A. (2018-06-12). "Identification and High-Resolution Imaging of α-Tocopherol from Human Cells to Whole Animals by TOF-SIMS Tandem Mass Spectrometry". Journal of the American Society for Mass Spectrometry. 29 (8): 1571–1581. Bibcode:2018JASMS..29.1571B. doi:10.1007/s13361-018-1979-x. ISSN 1044-0305. PMC 6060986. PMID 29949055.
4. Ščupáková, Klára; Soons, Zita; Ertaylan, Gökhan; Pierzchalski, Keely A.; Eijkel, Gert B.; Ellis, Shane R.; Greve, Jan W.; Driessen, Ann; Verheij, Joanne; De Kok, Theo M.; Olde Damink, Steven W. M. (17 April 2018). "Spatial Systems Lipidomics Reveals Nonalcoholic Fatty Liver Disease Heterogeneity". Analytical Chemistry. 90 (8): 5130–5138. doi:10.1021/acs.analchem.7b05215. ISSN 1520-6882. PMC 5906754. PMID 29570976.
5. Ellis, S. R.; Soltwisch, J.; Paine, M. R. L.; Dreisewerd, K.; Heeren, R. M. A. (2017). "Laser post-ionisation combined with a high resolving power orbitrap mass spectrometer for enhanced MALDI-MS imaging of lipids". Chemical Communications. 53 (53): 7246–7249. doi:10.1039/c7cc02325a. ISSN 1359-7345. PMID 28573274. S2CID 4627246.
6. Ogrinc Potočnik, Nina; Porta, Tiffany; Becker, Michael; Heeren, Ron M. A.; Ellis, Shane R. (2015-10-28). "Use of advantageous, volatile matrices enabled by next-generation high-speed matrix-assisted laser desorption/ionization time-of-flight imaging employing a scanning laser beam". Rapid Communications in Mass Spectrometry. 29 (23): 2195–2203. Bibcode:2015RCMS...29.2195O. doi:10.1002/rcm.7379. ISSN 0951-4198. PMID 26522310.
7. Ellis, Shane R.; Jungmann, Julia H.; Smith, Donald F.; Soltwisch, Jens; Heeren, Ron M. A. (2013-10-18). "Enhanced detection of high-mass proteins by using an active pixel detector". Angewandte Chemie International Edition in English. 52 (43): 11261–11264. doi:10.1002/anie.201305501. ISSN 1521-3773. PMID 24039122.
8. Jungmann, Julia H.; Smith, Donald F.; MacAleese, Luke; Klinkert, Ivo; Visser, Jan; Heeren, Ron M. A. (2012-07-27). "Biological Tissue Imaging with a Position and Time Sensitive Pixelated Detector". Journal of the American Society for Mass Spectrometry. 23 (10): 1679–1688. arXiv:1305.5437. Bibcode:2012JASMS..23.1679J. doi:10.1007/s13361-012-0444-5. ISSN 1044-0305. PMID 22836864. S2CID 13480751.
9. Jungmann, Julia H.; MacAleese, Luke; Visser, Jan; Vrakking, Marc J. J.; Heeren, Ron M. A. (2011-10-15). "High Dynamic Range Bio-Molecular Ion Microscopy with the Timepix Detector". Analytical Chemistry. 83 (20): 7888–7894. doi:10.1021/ac2017629. ISSN 0003-2700. PMID 21882854.
10. Chughtai, Kamila; Heeren, Ron M. A. (2010-05-12). "Mass Spectrometric Imaging for Biomedical Tissue Analysis". Chemical Reviews. 110 (5): 3237–3277. doi:10.1021/cr100012c. ISSN 0009-2665. PMC 2907483. PMID 20423155.
