= Reeshof =

Reeshof Tilburg Reeshof
- Location of the Reeshof in Tilburg
- Coordinates: 51°34′43.5″N 4°59′36″E
- Country: Netherlands
- Province: North Brabant
- Municipality: Tilburg

The Reeshof (also known as Tilburg Reeshof), is a district of the municipality Tilburg in the Netherlands.

The district has 42,696 inhabitants, which makes the Reeshof the largest district of Tilburg. The Reeshof mostly consists of new-built houses from 1980 or later.

== Neighbourhoods ==
Data from 2010:

| Neighbourhood | Inhabitants | Density/km^{2} |
|---|---|---|
| Gesworen Hoek | 4,080 | 4,614 |
| Huibeven | 5,555 | 4,404 |
| Heerevelden | 2,640 | 5,674 |
| Heyhoef | 365 | 5,026 |
| Campenhoef | 2,405 | 4,587 |
| Tuindorp de Kievit | 12,020 | 3,999 |
| Dongewijk | 2,020 | 3,531 |
| Dalem | 7,045 | 3,889 |
| Witbrant* | 2,700 | 1,642 |
| Koolhoven* | 3,125 | 1,872 |
| Total | 41,955 | 3,523 |

* Witbrant and Koolhoven were not finished yet when data was put online

The different neighbourhoods are almost clearly divided by the starting alphabetical letter of every street. The streets are named after Dutch villages and hamlets under 20.000 inhabitants, with some exceptions which contain bigger towns. In the neighbourhood Heerevelden for example, there are streets like Hillegomlaan and Haaftenstraat. Despite having the starting alphabetical letter too, Heerevelden is, together with Witbrant, the only neighbourhood with this. Three shopping areas facilitate the Reeshof. Buurmalsenplein in Gesworen Hoek which was the (temporary) main shopping area until 1997, the Heyhoef, the largest in its own neighbourhood built in 1997, and at last the Vallei in Dalem built in 2008.

== Parks and forests ==
The district is surrounded by multiple forests and parks. In the middle of the district, there's the Reeshofpark, which is about 60 acres of park. At the southern end, some restaurants were opened in 2011. The Reeshofpark is not considered safe at night, which caused nuisance among inhabitants. The park now has brighter lights and mobile camera control. Adjacent to the Reeshofpark, there's a nature development area, called the Dongevallei. This area was created after urban planners encountered government restrictions about natural development in the Netherlands. The Donge river had to be decanalized, and agricultural area to be excavated. From seeds buried in the deep ground of nearly a century ago, new plants (re-)originated there. Highland cattle is grazing in the area, fenced from housing to prevent escapings. The alder, which is too bitter for highland cattle, is grazed by Kempian sheep. The nature development area will be extended to Koolhoven Buiten, the la(te)st neighbourhood when ready. The Reeshofbos (formerly called Hultensche Heide) is a forest remaining in the east, which forms a part of the border with the rest of Tilburg. Huis Ter Heide (when industrial area Vossenberg counted with) and the Kaaistoep are larger forests adjacent to the Reeshof.

== Infrastructure ==
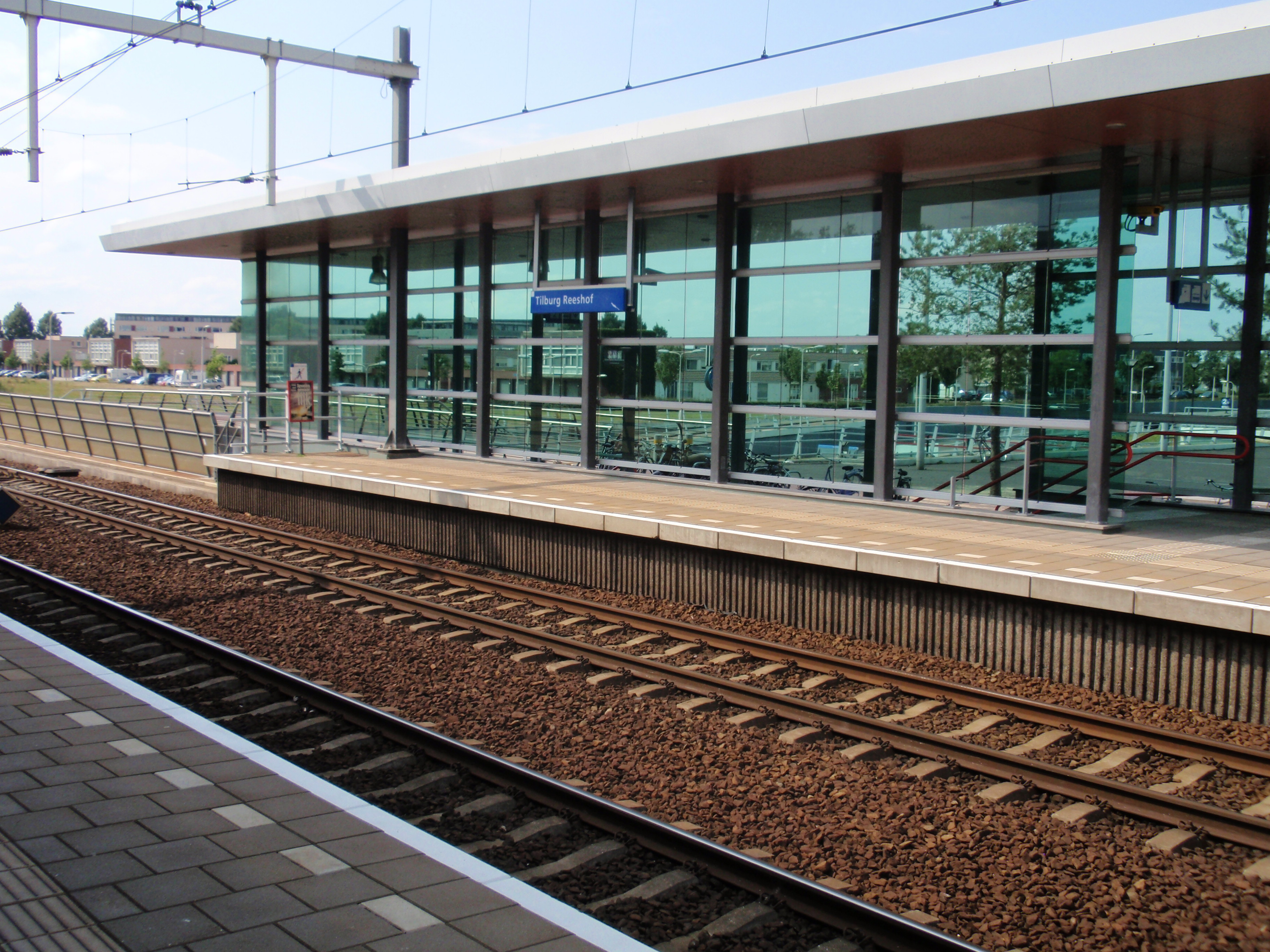
Tilburg Reeshof railway station

The district is connected by train with Tilburg Reeshof train station, built in 2003 to provide the district a railway connection to Breda and Tilburg Centrum. The district is connected via the Burgemeester Baron van Voorst tot Voorstweg in the east, the Bredaseweg in the south and the Burgemeester Letschertweg (partially under construction) in the west. The Letschertweg provides access to the A58. In the first years of the existence of the district, many complaints existed about the lack of infrastructure in that time. Before the eastern roads existed, people had to drive over the Reeshofdijk and Langendijk, and before the train station was finished, there existed an at-grade railway crossing at the Reeshofweg. The Wilhelmina Canal in the north is another boundary of the district. The canal will be widened to give more ships access to Tilburg, which will affect the canal zone in the Reeshof
