= Gilze-Rijen railway station =

Railway station in the Netherlands

Gilze-Rijen
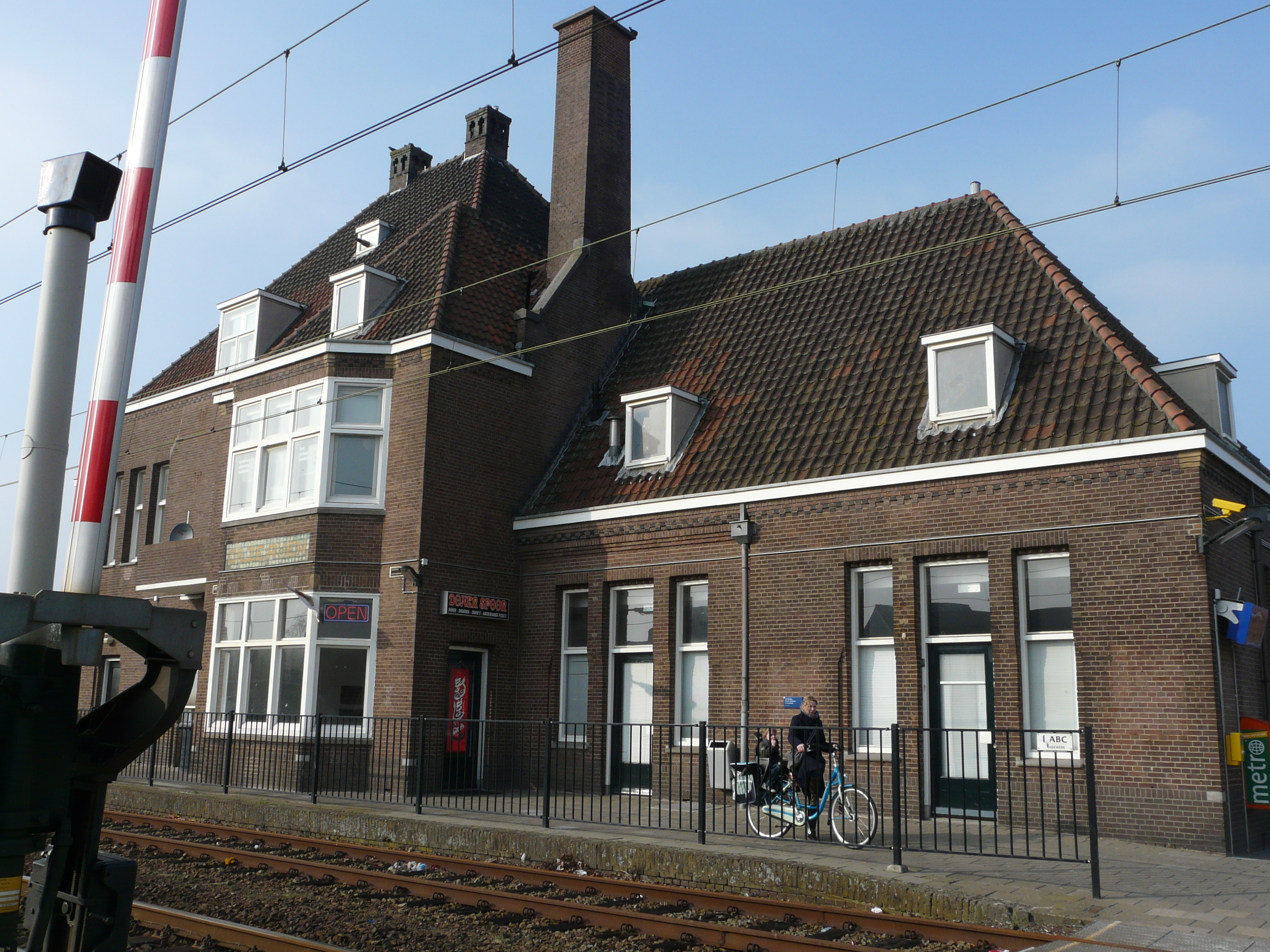

General information
- Location: Netherlands
- Coordinates: 51°35′02″N 4°55′30″E
- Line: Breda–Eindhoven railway

History
- Opened: 5 October 1863

Services
Preceding station	Nederlandse Spoorwegen	Following station
Breda towards Dordrecht	NS Sprinter 6600 Mon-Sat until 19:00	Tilburg Reeshof towards Arnhem Centraal
Breda towards Dordrecht	NS Sprinter 6600 After 19:00 and Sun	Tilburg Reeshof towards Nijmegen
Location
- Location within Netherlands

Gilze-Rijen is a railway station located in Rijen, Netherlands in the municipality Gilze en Rijen. Although the railway station is located in Rijen, it's called Gilze-Rijen because of the Gilze-Rijen Air Base, just south of Rijen. The station was opened on 5 October 1863 and is located on the Breda–Eindhoven railway between Breda and Tilburg. The station is operated by Nederlandse Spoorwegen.

== Train service ==
The following services currently call at Gilze-Rijen:

- 2x per hour local services (sprinter) 's-Hertogenbosch - Tilburg - Breda

== Bus services ==
Bus Services 130, 131, 230 and 231 stop outside the station.

130 goes from the town hall in Rijen to the immigration detention centre in Gilze; 131 goes from Breda to Tilburg via Gilze and Rijen.
