= Theo l'Herminez =

Dutch painter

- Self-portrait with brush (1991) by l'Herminez
- Born: 1921; Tilburg
- Died: 1997 (aged 75–76); Tilburg

Theodorus "Theo" Gerardus l'Herminez (1921-1997) was a Dutch painter.

He was given lessons in drawing by an artist from Tilburg and later studied at the Academie van Beeldende en Bouwende Kunsten in Tilburg from 1958–61, and some time passed before he evolved his particular style. Before starting on a new painting, he would make numerous sketches and from these a particular mood developed. Then followed endless additions and changes until he feared that further work would cause the loss of the essence of the picture.

Largely self-taught and later, moving from impressionism to realism, his favourite subjects were women who were aged, wrinkled and creased, and on whom life had clearly left its mark. These were not people of flesh and blood, but sprang rather from his fertile imagination. The women in his paintings are monumental, being composed of sculptural elements placed against a restful background which does not distract the viewer. Through his caricature of the figure, reality is given a hardened and stylised alien appearance. This effect is enhanced by his combining of strongly contrasting colours with more calming tones.

l'Herminez gained his inspiration through brief encounters with his subjects. The impressions which they left behind, were translated into the images, being qualities that he recognised from his own personality. In this sense his paintings are self-portraits, with his features being discernible in a number of his works. With a touch of cynicism, his portraits show everyone's self-interest, to the point of being unable to communicate. He depicts the cloak of youth and frivolity donned by women to hide ageing and decay, and who have been ravaged by the passage of time. At the same time he emphasises the vulnerability and beauty possessed by all, which manages to break through the cloak.

l'Herminez attempted to create a certain expression by which a feeling of spirituality was evoked. Art always faces the challenge of making visible that which cannot be expressed in words. In this his work has an affinity with mystical realism. In theme and emotional content he displays similarities to the artists Otto Dix and Christian Schad of the New German Pragmatism.

Besides his portraits of women, l'Herminez also produced many self-portraits, showing great consistency in facial expression and style.
