= Slavernijmonument =

2022 slavery monument in the Netherlands

Slavery Monument
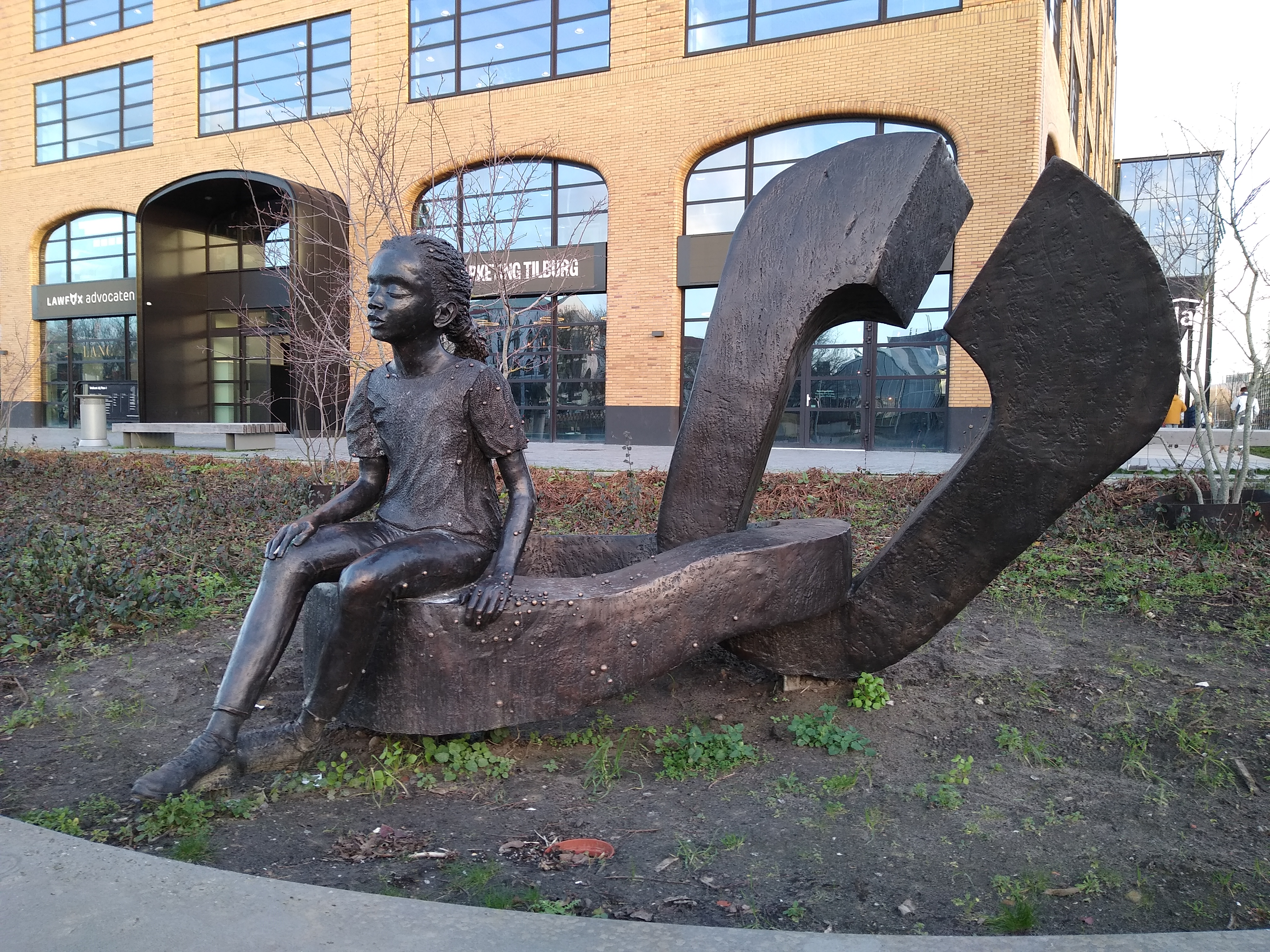
- Artist: Dedden & Keizer
- Year: 2022
- Type: Bronze
- Location: Tilburg, North Brabant, Netherlands; 51°33′40″N 5°05′03″E

Slavernijmonument (Slavery Monument) in the Dutch city of Tilburg commemorates the Netherlands' history of slavery. The sculpture, depicting a girl sitting on "broken chains", was designed by the artist duo Dedden & Keizer. It was unveiled on July 1, 2022, at the Burgemeester Stekelenburg square in Tilburg's Spoorzone area.

== Description ==
The monument is made of bronze and features two broken links symbolizing the chains of slavery being broken. This represents the (legal) abolition of slavery in the Netherlands on July 1, 1863, also known as Ketikoti or Emancipation Day. A girl, realistically sculpted but larger than life, sits on the horizontal link. With her eyes closed and one hand on the chain, she connects with the past in a moment of reflection. The trail of golden beads symbolizes the glass beads used as currency during the era.

== Creation ==
Tilburg is home to many descendants of enslaved people from Suriname and the former Dutch Caribbean. The first official commemoration of the abolition of slavery was held in Tilburg's Freedom Park on July 1, 2018. During this event, Mayor Weterings promised a slavery monument would be erected in the park. In 2020, initial steps were taken by a working group with the support of the cultural organization Kunstloc Brabant. The city, in consultation with this group, decided to place the monument at Burgemeester Stekelenburg square, behind the newly renovated Tilburg Centraal Station. The space in Freedom Park was deemed too limited for future commemorative ceremonies. This decision was final. The selection committee invited three artists to submit a design proposal. In 2021, Tilburg residents voted online for their favorite design. The winning design, by Dedden & Keizer, tells a story of 'captivity and suffering' while also being 'hopeful and forward-looking,' according to the committee.

== Unveiling ==
On July 1, 2022, the monument was unveiled as the first slavery monument in North Brabant by Mayor Weterings and the King's Commissioner Ina Adema, along with the girl who modeled for the sculpture. In his speech, the mayor described the monument as a powerful symbol "so that we do not forget what was done to people who were once enslaved" and "acknowledge that racism still has roots in society."

In January 2023, the slavery monument was vandalized with white paint. The city of Tilburg filed a police report.

== See also ==
- History of slavery in the Netherlands
