= Westpoint Tower =

Westpoint
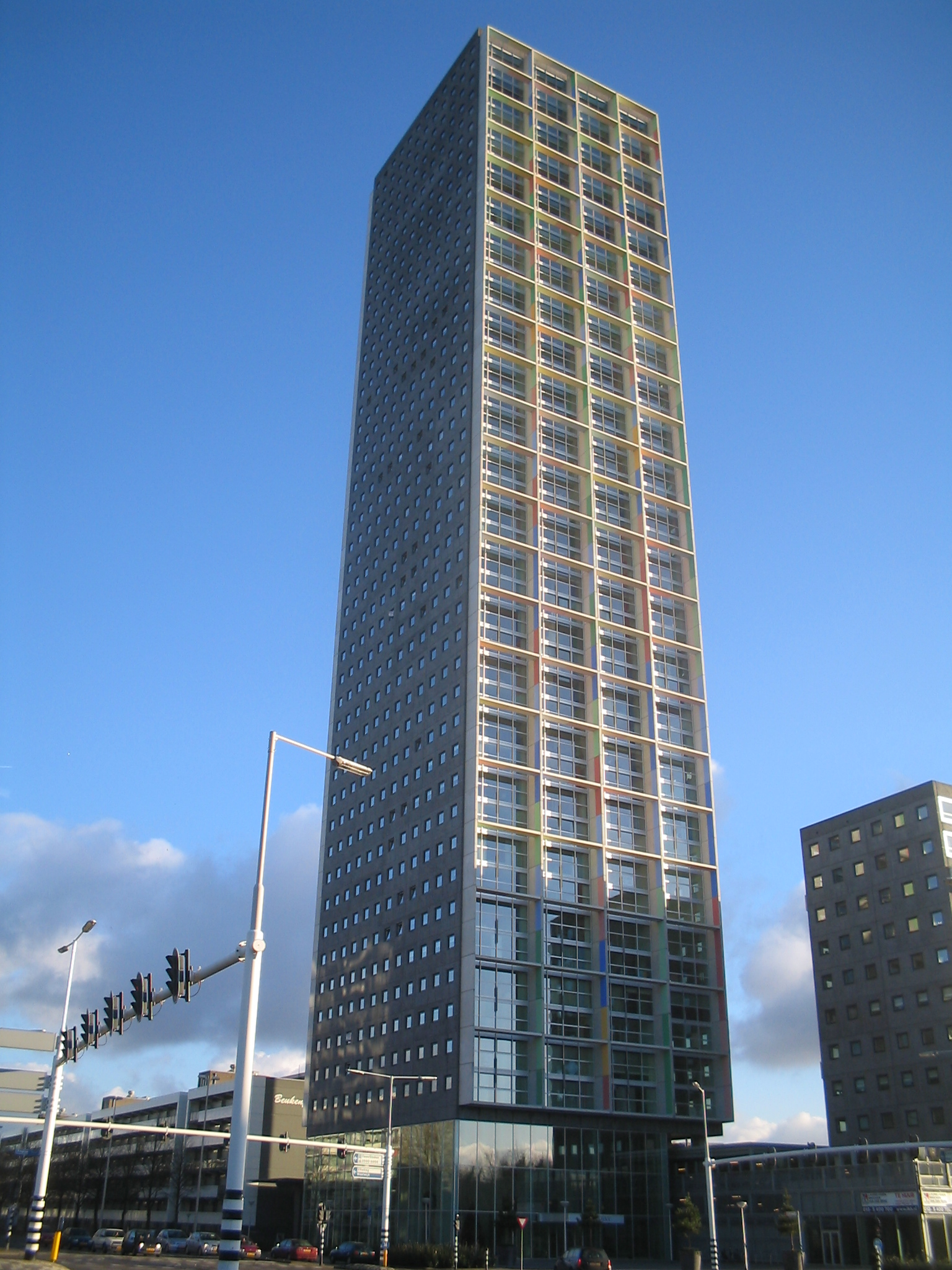
- Interactive map of the Westpoint area
- Alternative names: Westpoint-woontoren

General information
- Status: Completed
- Type: Residential condominiums
- Architectural style: Modernism
- Location: Westpoint 1-160; Tilburg, Netherlands
- Coordinates: 51.56°N 5.0652°E
- Completed: 2001 - 2004

Height
- Roof: 141.6 m (465 ft)

Technical details
- Floor count: 47
- Floor area: 33,022 m^{2} (355,450 sq ft)

Design and construction
- Architect: Van Aken Architectuur en Stedebouw

Other information
- Number of units: 156

Westpoint Tower (Dutch: Westpoint-woontoren) is the tallest residential building in Tilburg, Netherlands. It is 141.6 metres tall, and has 48 floors. Construction of Westpoint Tower was completed in 2004. At the time of completion the tower was the highest residential building in the Netherlands until 6 November 2010 when it was surpassed by the New Orleans skyscraper in Rotterdam.

The building was designed by Margriet Eugelink (Van Aken Architektuur).

The vertical and horizontal concrete elements of the grid at the front and the back of the tower are painted in different colours. At night, lights in different colours decorate the tower.
