= Tilburg Reeshof railway station =

Railway station in the Netherlands

Tilburg Reeshof
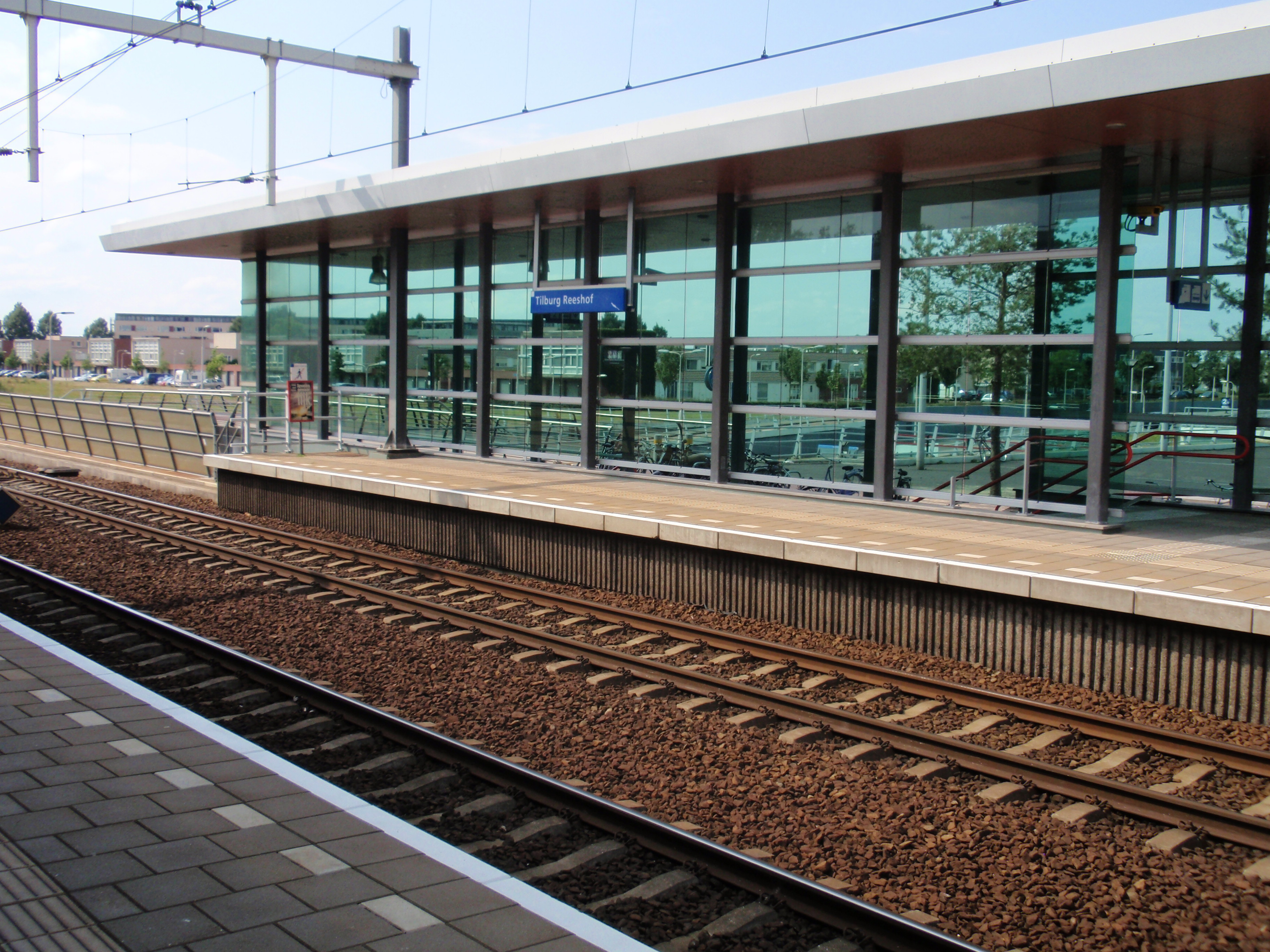

General information
- Location: Netherlands
- Coordinates: 51°34′26″N 4°59′34″E
- Line: Breda–Eindhoven railway

History
- Opened: 14 December 2003

Services
Preceding station	Nederlandse Spoorwegen	Following station
Gilze-Rijen towards Dordrecht	NS Sprinter 6600 Mon-Sat until 19:00	Tilburg Universiteit towards Arnhem Centraal
Gilze-Rijen towards Dordrecht	NS Sprinter 6600 After 19:00 and Sun	Tilburg Universiteit towards Nijmegen
Location
- Location within Netherlands

Tilburg Reeshof is a railway station located in the Reeshof in Tilburg, Netherlands. It is situated on the Breda–Eindhoven railway. The station was opened on 14 December 2003. The train services are operated by Nederlandse Spoorwegen.

== Train service ==
The following services currently call at Tilburg Reeshof:

- 2x per hour local services (sprinter) Arnhem Centraal - Nijmegen - 's-Hertogenbosch - Tilburg - Breda - Dordrecht

== Bus service ==
The station is served by the following city bus line, operated by Arriva:

Line	Route	Frequency	Notes
4	Centraal Station - Universiteit - Zwartvenseweg - Witbrant/Amarant - Station Reeshof - Reeshof Zuid - Reeshof West - Middeldijkdreef	Weekdays rush hours, outside holidays: 6x/hour, but only 3x/hour Zwartvenseweg-Amarant-Station Reeshof and Zwartvenseweg-Witbrant- Station Reeshof; Outside weekdays rush hours and weekends, outside holidays: 4x/hour, but 2x/hour on evenings and Sundays; Holidays: 2x/hour, but 4x/hour during weekdays rush hours and Saturdays outside evenings	Arrives/Continues as line 2 at Middeldijkdreef; During weekdays rush hours outside holidays the sections Zwartvenseweg-Amarant-Station Reeshof and Zwartvenseweg-Witbrant-Station Reeshof are alternately served; The section Zwartvenseweg-Amarant-Station Reeshof is only served on weekdays rush hours outside holidays
