= Tilburg =

City in North Brabant, Netherlands

- City and municipality
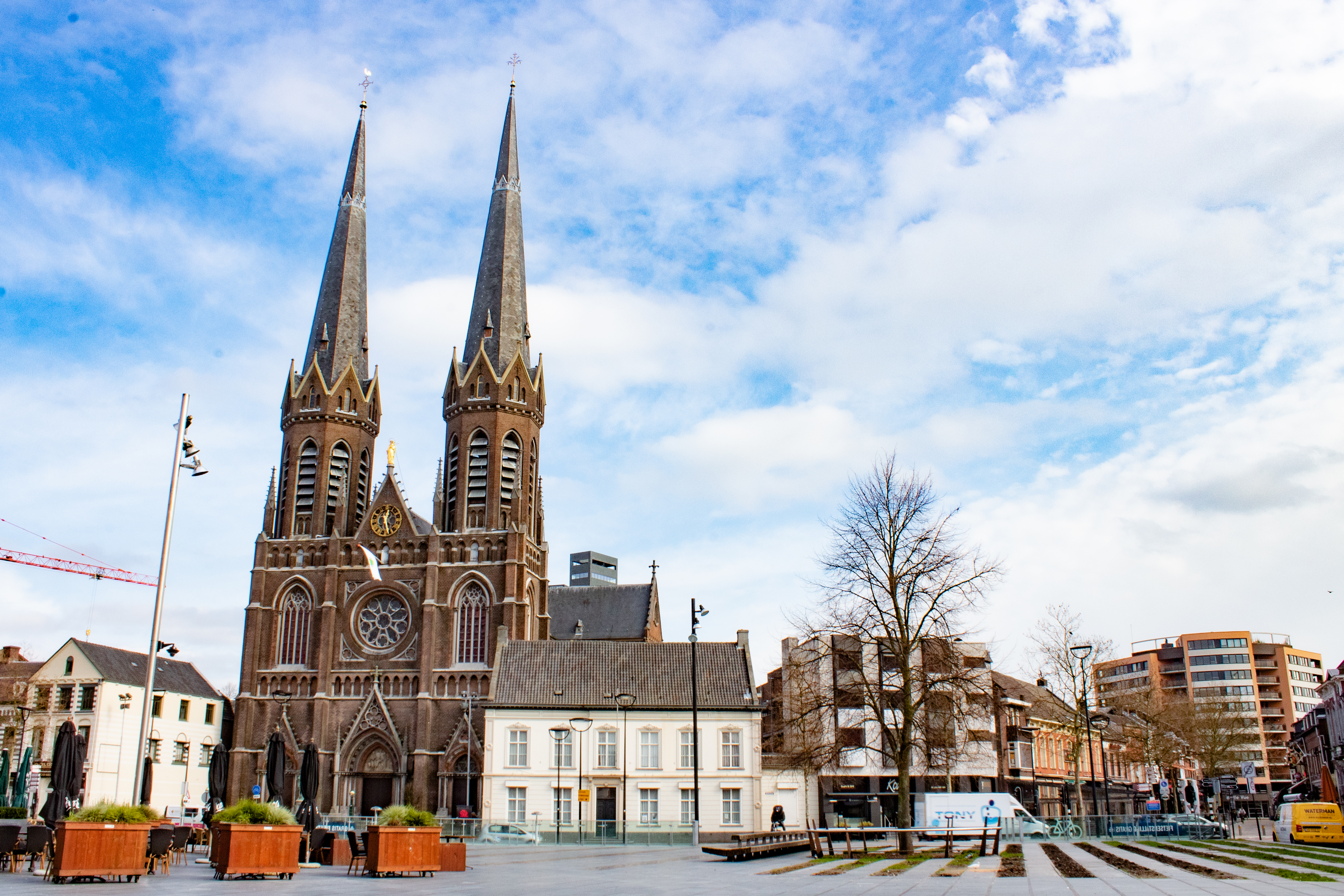
- The Heuvel, a central square being overlooked by the Heuvelse kerk

- Flag Coat of arms Brandmark
- Interactive map of Tilburg
- Location within the Netherlands Location within Europe
- Coordinates: 51°33′27″N 5°05′26″E
- Country: Netherlands
- Province: North Brabant

Government
  - Body: Municipal council
  - Mayor: Fleur Gräper (D66)

Area
  - Municipality: 118.13 km^{2} (45.61 sq mi)
  - Land: 116.17 km^{2} (44.85 sq mi)
  - Water: 1.96 km^{2} (0.76 sq mi)
- Elevation: 14 m (46 ft)

Population (municipality, January 2026; urban and metro, May 2014)
  - Municipality: 230,746
  - Density: 1,986/km^{2} (5,140/sq mi)
  - Urban: 233,339
  - Metro: 300,249
  - Metro region: 553,706
  - Brabant metropolitan area: 1,944,588
- Demonym: Tilburger
- Time zone: UTC+1 (CET)
  - Summer (DST): UTC+2 (CEST)
- Postcode: 5000–5049, 5056, 5070–5071, 5074
- Area code: 013
- Website: www.tilburg.nl

Tilburg (Dutch: [ˈtɪlbʏr(ə)x]) is a city and municipality in the Netherlands, in the southern province of North Brabant. With a population of 229,833 (2 January 2024), it is the second-largest city or municipality in North Brabant after Eindhoven and the seventh-largest in the Netherlands.

Tilburg University is located in Tilburg, as are Avans University of Applied Sciences and Fontys University of Applied Sciences.

The region is served by three railway stations: Tilburg, Tilburg Universiteit and Tilburg Reeshof. The 75-hectare (185-acre) "Spoorzone" area around Tilburg Central station, once a Dutch Railways train maintenance yard, has been purchased by the city and is being transformed into an urban zone.

== History ==
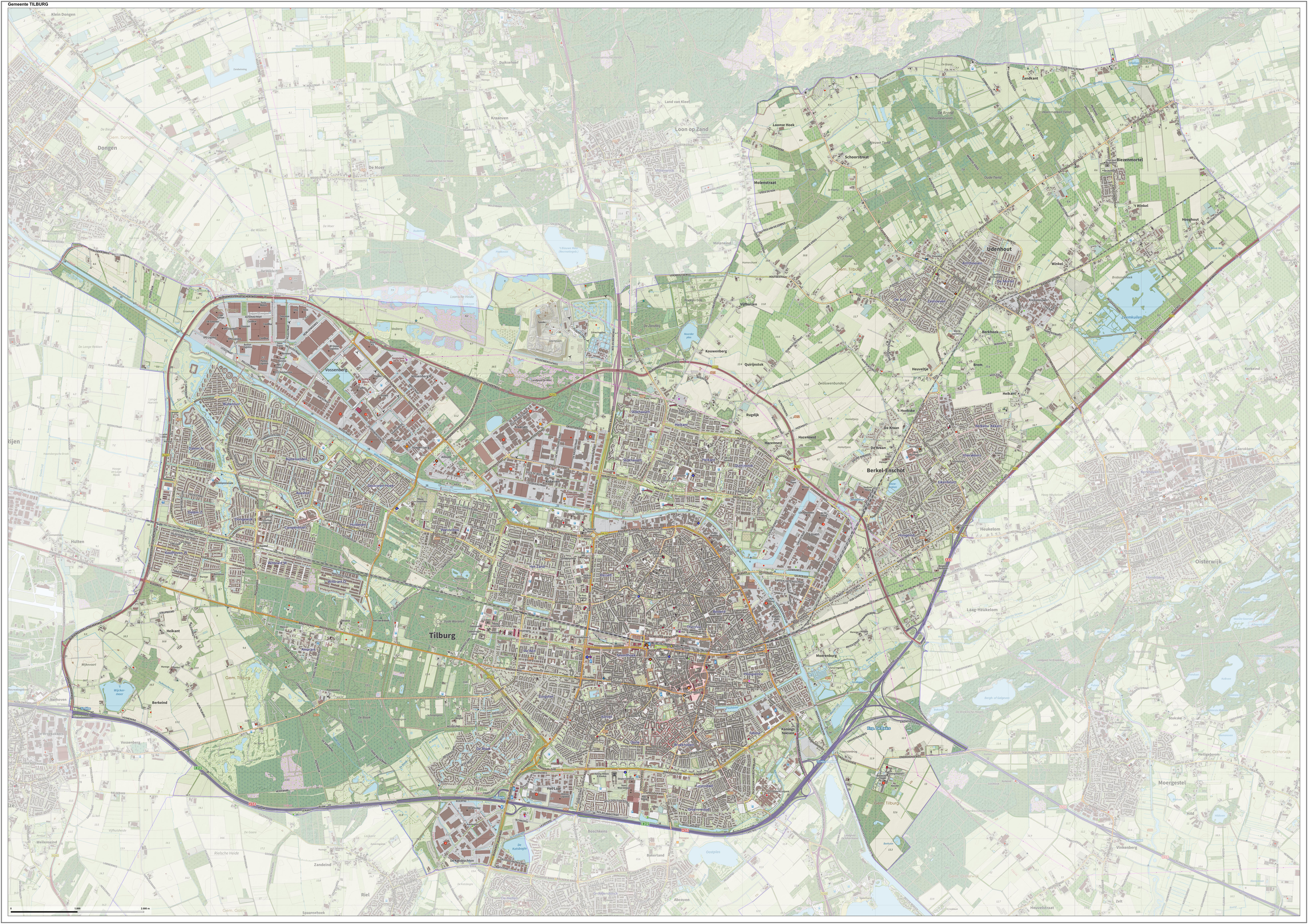
Map of the municipality of Tilburg, 2022

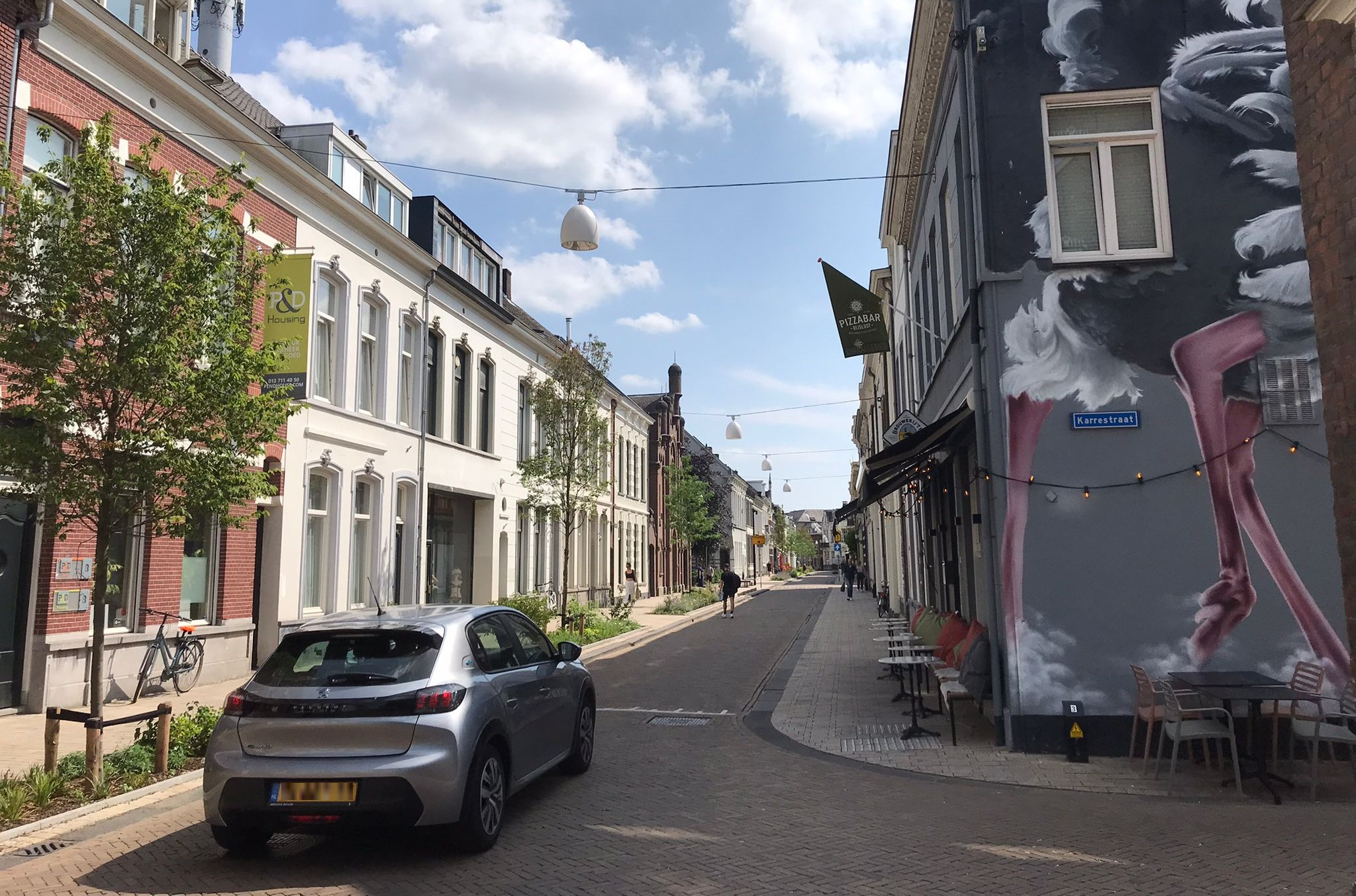
Tilburg, William II street

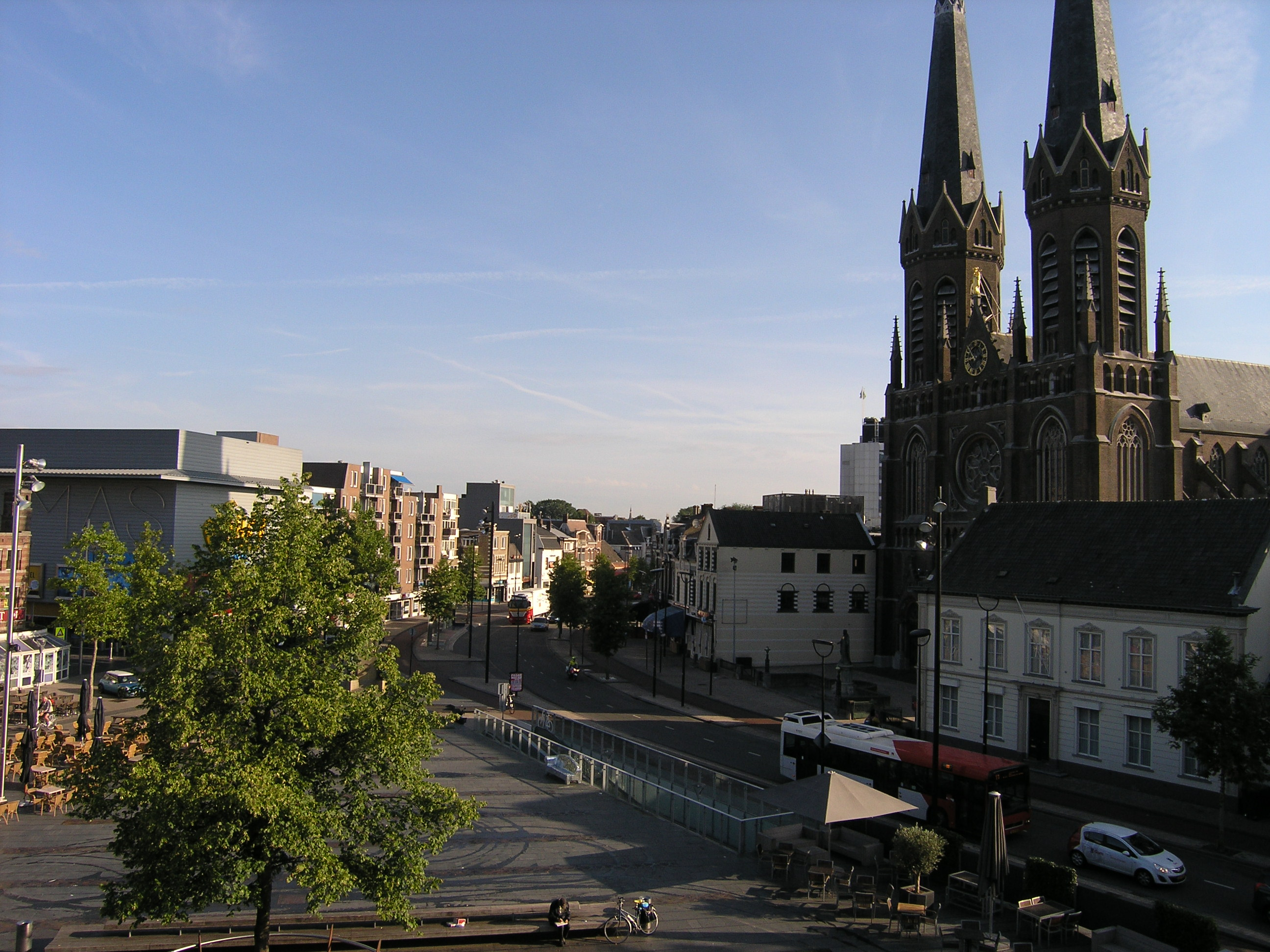
Tilburg, Heuvel

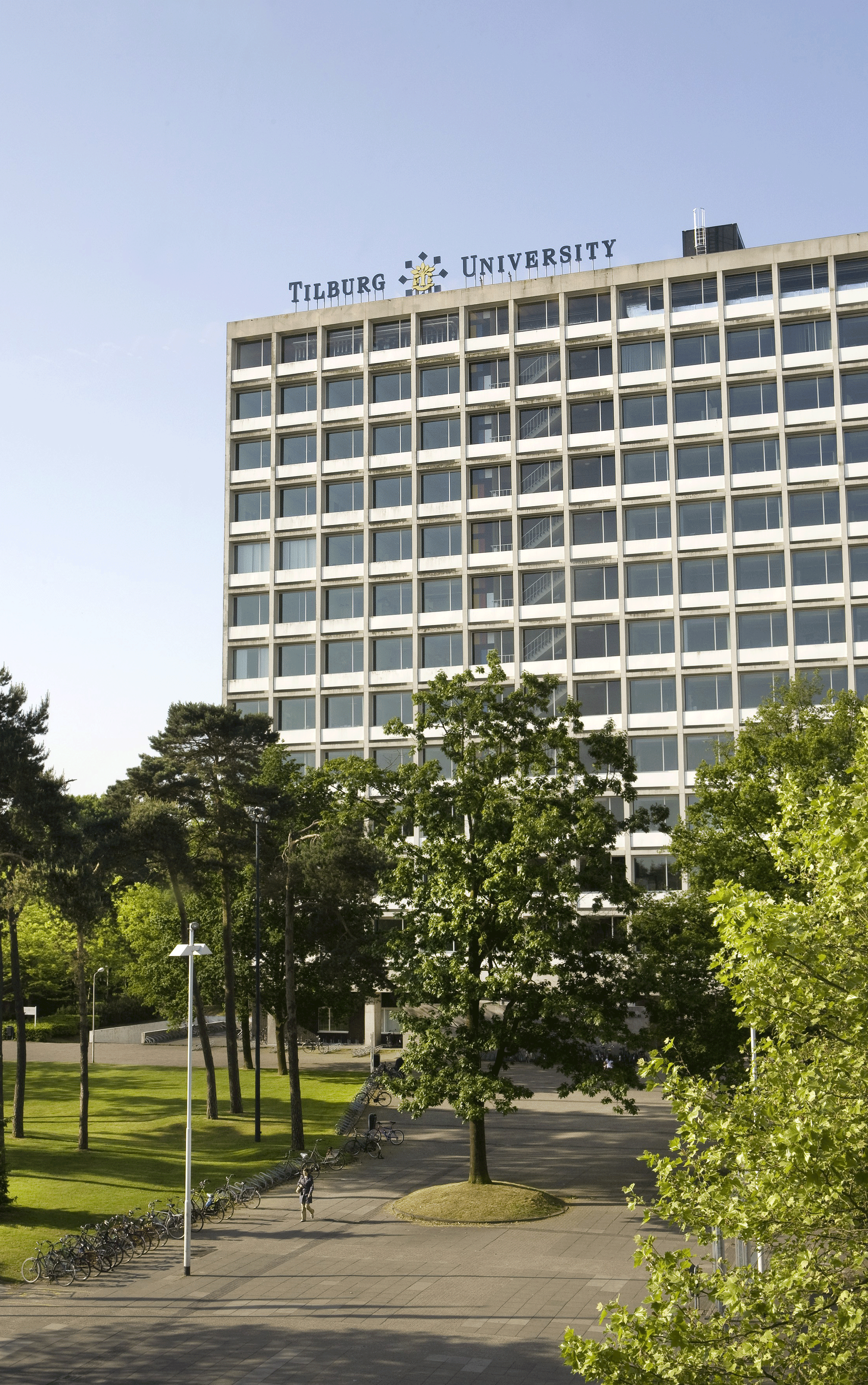
Tilburg University

Little is known about the beginnings of Tilburg. The name Tilliburg first appeared in documents dating from AD 709, but after that there was no mention for several centuries. In the later Middle Ages, Tilburg referred to a region rather than a particular town or village; its population was largely in a couple of hamlets, one of which was known as "Eastern Tilburg" (Oost-Tilburg), which was later reflected in the name Oisterwijk ("Eastern Quarter"). This village centred around a small (probably wooden) castle or Motteburcht on an equally small hill, which became derelict and was torn down after a few centuries at most. Of this first "Tilburg Castle", nothing remained c. 2000, except for a few remnants of its moat in the suburbs of Oisterwijk. In the 14th century, Tilburg was proclaimed a manor; together with Goirle, it acquired the title of "The Manor of Tilburg and Goirle".

Successively, the manorial rights fell into the hands of several lords of noble lineage. They derived their income from taxes, fines and interest paid by the villagers.

In the 15th century, one of the lords of Tilburg, Jan van Haestrecht, built Tilburg Castle. "That stone chamber at Hasselt" is mentioned in several historical documents. In 1858, however, the castle was pulled down to make way for a factory, but the name lives on, in the city arms and logo. A replica of the foundations of the castle was restored in c. 1995 in its original location, after the factory was demolished. In 1803, Goirle was separated from Tilburg and on 18 April 1809, Tilburg was granted city status. In that year, it had about 9,000 inhabitants. In 2009 Tilburg hosted several festivities in celebration of 200 years as a city.

=== Wool capital of the Netherlands ===
Tilburg grew around one of the so-called "herd places" or "Frankish triangles", triangular plots where a number of roads (usually sand roads) met. These herd places were collective pasturelands for flocks of sheep. Their shape is still reflected in the layout of many places in Tilburg. Many districts, including Korvel, Oerle, Broekhoven, Hasselt, Heikant, De Schans, and Heuvel, bear the names of these old hamlets. The poor farmers living in these hamlets soon decided not to sell the wool from their sheep but to weave it themselves, and for a long time, much of the space inside their small houses was occupied by a loom—by the 17th century these numbered about 300. Enterprising people saw their chance. As so-called "drapers", they supplied the weavers with the raw materials for their "home working", and the first Tilburg "mill houses" came into existence. From then on, the wool industry underwent rapid growth, and in 1881 Tilburg had as many as 145 wool mills. Home weaving continued, however, until the early 20th century. Woollen textiles from Tilburg were known far and wide.

After World War II Tilburg retained its place as wool capital of the Netherlands, but in the 1960s the industry collapsed and by the 1980s the number of operating wool mills had declined. Present-day Tilburg industry consists of a wide variety of enterprises. The main economic sector has become transport and logistics with a variety of industry as a close second.

=== Urban renewal ===
When the wool industry collapsed in the 1960s, Cees Becht was the mayor of Tilburg. While he was in office, many old buildings were demolished, including some historic monuments. The Koningswei neighbourhood (King's Meadows) was demolished and replaced by Koningsplein (King's Square). Done as slum clearance, many feel that the new square feels abandoned most of the year. Considered worse was the demolition of the old city hall. Although this classic-styled building was a national-registered monument, it was replaced with a modern nine-storey black complex. A part of the empty area was used to build the inner Cityring road system. The century-old railway station was replaced by a modern one, a part of a Hoogspoor (literally: high rails), a project that put the railway on viaducts to reduce traffic congestion. Because of projects of this kind across Tilburg, Cees Becht gained the dubious nickname Cees de Sloper (Cees the demolisher).

=== Modern history ===
In the 1980s, many locations, formerly occupied by wool factories had been filled with small-scale housing projects. This mostly happened when Henk Letschert was mayor of Tilburg. The Heuvel, one of the main squares, had its own lime tree until 27 April 1994, being chopped down for a bicycle parking basement. The felling led to many protests, because the tree was still healthy. After the Pieter Vreedeplein reconstruction, plans were made to plant a descendant of the original lime tree. Three were placed, only one of them survived. The last living tree was moved to another location, but died shortly after.

In the 1990s Tilburg developed a high-rise skyline. Three buildings were built, considered skyscrapers in the Netherlands. These were the Interpolis headquarters, the Westpoint Tower and StadsHeer. The Westpoint Tower has an altitude of 143.1 metres (469.5 feet) and was the tallest residential tower in the Netherlands until the Montevideo in Rotterdam surpassed it. The 'StadsHeer' is the third one and is part of the 'Haestrechtkwartier' (Haestrecht quarter). The residential tower is nicknamed De Vogelkooikes (The Bird Cages) for its cubic balconies taped onto the building.

=== King William II ===
King William II (1792–1849) was fond of Tilburg. "Here I can breathe freely and I feel happy", he once said about the town. King William II always supported Tilburg—he provided money to improve the sheep breeding, built new farms and founded a cavalry barracks on St. Joseph Street, now a monumental building of the City Archives. Although the King was always made welcome by the manufacturers he had befriended, he needed his own residence in Tilburg, and commissioned the construction of a palace, which would function as his country residence. Construction started in 1847 and was completed just days before William II died, in 1849. It is now part of Tilburg City Hall. In 1987 an obelisk was erected nearby, in memory of King William II. It replaced the old "needle" dating from 1874, which was removed from the street in 1968. After its restoration, William II's statue was again placed in the heart of the city. The local football club Willem II Tilburg was named after him.

== Topography ==
=== Tilburg Centrum ===
Location of Tilburg-Centrum

Tilburg Centrum is the downtown of Tilburg, and is situated between (clockwise) the Spoorlaan, Heuvelring, Paleisring, Schouwburgring and Noordhoekring, which is the same as the order of the one-way roads around the district. The district has 6,572 inhabitants, and most of the shops, hotels, restaurants and cafes of the city. In 2008, the refurbished Pieter Vreedeplein was opened to the public, addressing a lack of shopping facilities as compared to similar-sized cities in the Netherlands. Two smaller cinemas were replaced by a bigger one on the Pieter Vreedeplein in 2007. Despite being called Centrum, the district is some distance southeast of the geographical center. The district is connected by the Tilburg railway station.

=== Oud-Noord ===
Location of Tilburg Oud-Noord

Oud-Noord is situated north of the railway that crosses Tilburg, and between the Ringbanen (ring roads around the city center). The district has 33,915 inhabitants. Contemporary arts museum De Pont is located within the district. When the railway marshalling yard belonging to the Nederlandse Spoorwegen became obsolete, a considerable stretch of the railway across the city, the Spoorzone, became an urban renewal project. New premises for two courses run by Fontys University of Applied Sciences will be located here, as will Tilburg's new central library, replacing the library in Koningsplein. The railway yard is the largest area, though more areas along the railway will be reconstructed.

=== Oud-Zuid ===
Location of Tilburg Oud-Zuid

Oud-Zuid is a district south, and also west and east of downtown Tilburg. The district has 38,659 inhabitants. As of 2012, all the 'skyscrapers' of Tilburg, higher than 100 m (330 ft) are located within the district. The Hart van Brabantlaan is almost surrounded by high buildings like Westpoint Tower and the StadsHeer as a small part of the urban renewal. This area along the railway is partly located in Oud-Zuid. Many important locations in Tilburg are located within the district, just out of the center, such as 013 music venue and the Schouwburg built in 1961. Also the Koningsplein with the main library and the Piushaven are located within the district. Old herd places include Korvel, Broekhoven and Oerle.

=== Noord ===
Location of Tilburg-Noord

Tilburg-Noord is located north of the Wilhelmina Canal. The district has 23,340 inhabitants. Tilburg-Noord was built in the period 1966–1974. Therefore, it has many apartment buildings up to 16 floors, drive-in houses, green strips and industrial development. The streets in this district are mostly named after musicians from the Renaissance up to pop artists from the 1960s. The main shopping center is Wagnerplein, while there's also the Verdiplein in Stokhasselt. The one at the Tartinistraat became defunct. Before the district was built, it was mainly an agricultural area attached to a few villages, including Heikant, which is still the name of the biggest neighbourhood. Heikant's former village square, including the old church, is still present. The northernmost part of the district is still agricultural with some forests. In this agricultural area, the priest Peter Donders was born; there still stands a chapel and a procession park.

=== Oost ===
Location of Tilburg-Oost

Tilburg-oost consists of primarily industrial development. Residential neighbourhoods are in a small strip east of the Ringbaan Oost rather than the whole district, however, it is not considered as a part of the city center. The district only has 748 inhabitants.

=== Zuid ===
Location of Tilburg-Zuid

Tilburg-Zuid is located between the A58 motorway and the Ringbaan Zuid, and is the southernmost district. Tilburg-zuid has 19,149 inhabitants. The district contains two neighbourhoods and many businesses. The football club Willem II is located within the district, as well as IJssportcentrum Tilburg next to the speed skating rink, the Ireen Wüst IJsbaan, which is located here. The main campus of Fontys University of Applied Sciences is located in this district, as well as St. Elisabeth hospital and Leijpark, one of the largest public parks in the city.

=== West ===
Location Tilburg-West

Tilburg-west was mostly built after WWII, and has 26,655 inhabitants. The district with its neighbourhoods consists mostly of small brick houses and apartment buildings, except for Zorgvlied, which contains more expensive, free-standing houses. The Westermarkt is the largest shopping center out of the inner city. Many higher educational buildings are standing here, like Tilburg University and the Avans University of Applied Sciences. Another place of many schools is along the Reitse Hoevenstraat with multiple secondary schools such as: Jozefmavo and Theresialyceum. The district is connected by train with the Tilburg Universiteit railway station, Previously known as "Tilburg West station" and has one of the two hospitals in Tilburg (TweeSteden ziekenhuis). The largest mosque of Tilburg, the Turkish Süleymaniye-Mosque built in 2001, stands in the southeastern corner of the district. West is surrounded by forests like Wandelbos and the Oude Warande, located west of the university.

=== Reeshof ===
Location of the Reeshof

The Reeshof is the westernmost district and the most recent expansion of the city of Tilburg proper. and has a population of 42,994 inhabitants. Because of this, the Reeshof became the largest district of Tilburg by population. The first houses were completed in 1980, in the neighbourhood Gesworen Hoek. As of 2012, the last neighbourhood (Koolhoven Buiten) is under construction. The district is connected by the Tilburg Reeshof railway station and multiple roads that encircle the district plus the industrial development Vossenberg north of the Wilhelmina Canal. The Donge runs through the district, including greenspace with some Highland cattle grazing between the fences protecting the surrounding neighbourhoods. This small-scale nature project is called the Dongevallei, which literally means Donge Valley in English.

== Demographics ==
=== Ethnic makeup ===
The population of Tilburg was 222,601 on 1 July 2021. According to the Tilburg city council, the city will reach a population of 217,000 by 2025. Of these, 23.3% (47,964 people) are of foreign descent. People are classified as being of foreign descent when they were born outside of the Netherlands, or when at least one of their parents was born outside of the Netherlands.

=== Inhabitants by origin ===
2020	Numbers	%
Dutch natives	156,496	71.2
Western migration background	26,889	12.2
Non-Western migration background	36,404	16.5
Turkey	8,236	3.74
Morocco	6,223	2.83
Netherlands Antilles and Aruba	5,017	2.28
Indonesia	4,611	2.09
Suriname	3,457	1.57
Total	219,789	100%

City of Tilburg population by country of origin (2025)
Country/territory	Population
Netherlands	153,004
Turkey	8,881
Poland	8,632
Morocco	6,428
(Netherlands) Dutch Caribbean	5,714
Indonesia	4,454
Suriname	3,544
Germany	3,164
Soviet Union	2,926
Belgium	2,808
Syria	2,212
Somalia	2,043
Romania	1,889

=== Religion and life stances ===
The Tilburg agglomeration has the following religious makeup as of 2003:

- Roman Catholic (60.7%)
- Atheism (21.7%)
- Dutch Reformed (7.8%)
- Islam (4.8%)
- Reformed (4.4%)

== Geography ==
=== Climate ===
Tilburg experiences an oceanic climate (Köppen climate classification Cfb) similar to almost all of the Netherlands. Thunderstorms occur in Western Brabant more often than anywhere else in the Netherlands, up to 31 days a year.

Climate data for Gilze-Rijen, 1981–2010 normals
Month	Jan	Feb	Mar	Apr	May	Jun	Jul	Aug	Sep	Oct	Nov	Dec	Year
Record high °C (°F)	15.2 (59.4)	18.2 (64.8)	24.7 (76.5)	29.1 (84.4)	33.2 (91.8)	34.7 (94.5)	36.8 (98.2)	35.8 (96.4)	33.1 (91.6)	27.2 (81.0)	19.7 (67.5)	15.9 (60.6)	36.8 (98.2)
Mean daily maximum °C (°F)	5.8 (42.4)	6.6 (43.9)	10.4 (50.7)	14.4 (57.9)	18.4 (65.1)	20.9 (69.6)	23.2 (73.8)	23.0 (73.4)	19.4 (66.9)	14.9 (58.8)	9.7 (49.5)	6.2 (43.2)	14.4 (57.9)
Daily mean °C (°F)	3.1 (37.6)	3.4 (38.1)	6.4 (43.5)	9.3 (48.7)	13.3 (55.9)	15.8 (60.4)	18.1 (64.6)	17.6 (63.7)	14.5 (58.1)	10.8 (51.4)	6.6 (43.9)	3.6 (38.5)	10.2 (50.4)
Mean daily minimum °C (°F)	0.0 (32.0)	−0.2 (31.6)	2.1 (35.8)	3.8 (38.8)	7.6 (45.7)	10.3 (50.5)	12.7 (54.9)	12.2 (54.0)	9.9 (49.8)	6.7 (44.1)	3.3 (37.9)	0.8 (33.4)	5.8 (42.4)
Record low °C (°F)	−19.3 (−2.7)	−20.2 (−4.4)	−14.2 (6.4)	−7.3 (18.9)	−2.3 (27.9)	1.5 (34.7)	3.9 (39.0)	3.9 (39.0)	0.0 (32.0)	−6.7 (19.9)	−10.8 (12.6)	−17.0 (1.4)	−20.2 (−4.4)
Average precipitation mm (inches)	70.0 (2.76)	57.2 (2.25)	64.1 (2.52)	46.0 (1.81)	61.2 (2.41)	65.8 (2.59)	75.6 (2.98)	66.0 (2.60)	72.4 (2.85)	75.0 (2.95)	76.1 (3.00)	75.8 (2.98)	805.2 (31.7)
Average precipitation days (≥ 0.1 mm)	17	14	17	13	14	14	14	13	14	16	18	18	182
Average snowy days (≥ 0.1 cm)	6	6	4	2	0	0	0	0	0	0	2	5	25
Average relative humidity (%)	88	84	81	75	74	75	76	77	82	86	89	90	82
Mean monthly sunshine hours	63.1	84.5	119.1	171.7	203.8	195.5	205.9	190.2	142.0	113.4	64.2	50.1	1,603.5
Source: KNMI

== Economy ==
The economy was concentrated on wool industry for centuries. However, since the 1960s, Tilburg has made progress in having different kinds of industries, supported by the government after the decline of wool industry. Chemical company IFF has a factory in Tilburg. In the 1980s, the Japanese company Fujifilm came to Tilburg. Insurance companies like Interpolis and CZ are headquartered here. Iris Ohyama has its European offices in Tilburg. Since 2013, the electric car-producing company Tesla operates their main EU facility for assembly and distribution in Europe in the industrial area of Vossenberg north of the suburb "De Reeshof" in Tilburg.

Tilburg has a high concentration of transportation/distribution industries, specializing in value added logistics and services, due to being the geographical center of the Benelux countries and being located on the transport corridor between Antwerp / Rotterdam and the Ruhr area. The 'Waalwijk-Tilburg' region has been in the logistics hotspots top 3 within the Netherlands for years now and finished third in 2017.

== Education ==
=== Tilburg University ===
Higher education is significant, with Tilburg University attracting scholars from all over the world. It has a student population of about 13,000, about 8 per cent of whom are international students. With a well-facilitated library, museums and a city center with many pubs and cafes, this percentage has steadily increased in recent years. TiU offers both Dutch-taught and English-taught programmes.

The institution has gained a reputation in both research and education. In the field of economics, the Faculty of Economics and Business Administration ranked No. 1 in Europe for the second consecutive time in 2007 according to the Journal of the European Economic Association with regard to publications in top journals. In 2007 the Executive MBA program at the university's TiasNimbas Business School ranked # 11 in the world according to the Financial Times.

=== Fontys School of Fine and Performing Arts ===
Tilburg is also the location of the Fontys School of Fine and Performing Arts (Dutch: Fontys Hogeschool voor de Kunsten - FHK), part of the Fontys Hogescholen. The School originated from the merging of various educational institutions that had existed in different capacity in Tilburg before being united under the Fontys group, such as the Brabants Conservatorium, one of the nine conservatoires in the Netherlands, and the Academie voor Beeldende Vorming.

Fontys School of Arts offers various bachelor and master programmes in English and in Dutch, across different fields in music, visual arts, dance, theatre and performing arts.

This institution is based in a building known as 'Kunstkluster', located in the centre of the city next to the Schouwburg and incorporating a Concert Hall.

== Culture and recreation ==
Tilburg is a pilot city of the Council of Europe and the EU Intercultural Cities programme.

=== Beverages ===
Schrobbelèr is a local liqueur. It has an alcoholic percentage of 21.5%, slightly lower than most bitters and has a relatively sweet flavour. The drink is sold in a stone jar and is drunk cold from its own glass, a high and tiny chalice glass, larger than a Jägermeister glass. The drink originated in 1973 when Tilburgian entrepreneur Jan Wassing started experimenting with a drink with lower alcoholic percentage that was appropriate for his stomach. The result was successful. The drink is distilled now at Loven industrial area in Tilburg by the Eindhoven company Schrobbeler Ltd, without the è on the last vowel. The drink is especially consumed at Carnival. The name is derived from the profession of 'Schrobbelaar', in the textile industry in Tilburg. The profession was unskilled and had a low wage.

Another known drink from Tilburg is Peerke's Nat, which has a higher alcoholic percentage than Schrobbelèr (25%) and was introduced at the beatification of Peter Donders (locally named Peerke). The drink is sold in bottles of 70 centiliters.

The Koningshoeven Brewery brews trappist beer. It was founded in 1884 at Koningshoeven Abbey.

=== Open air art ===
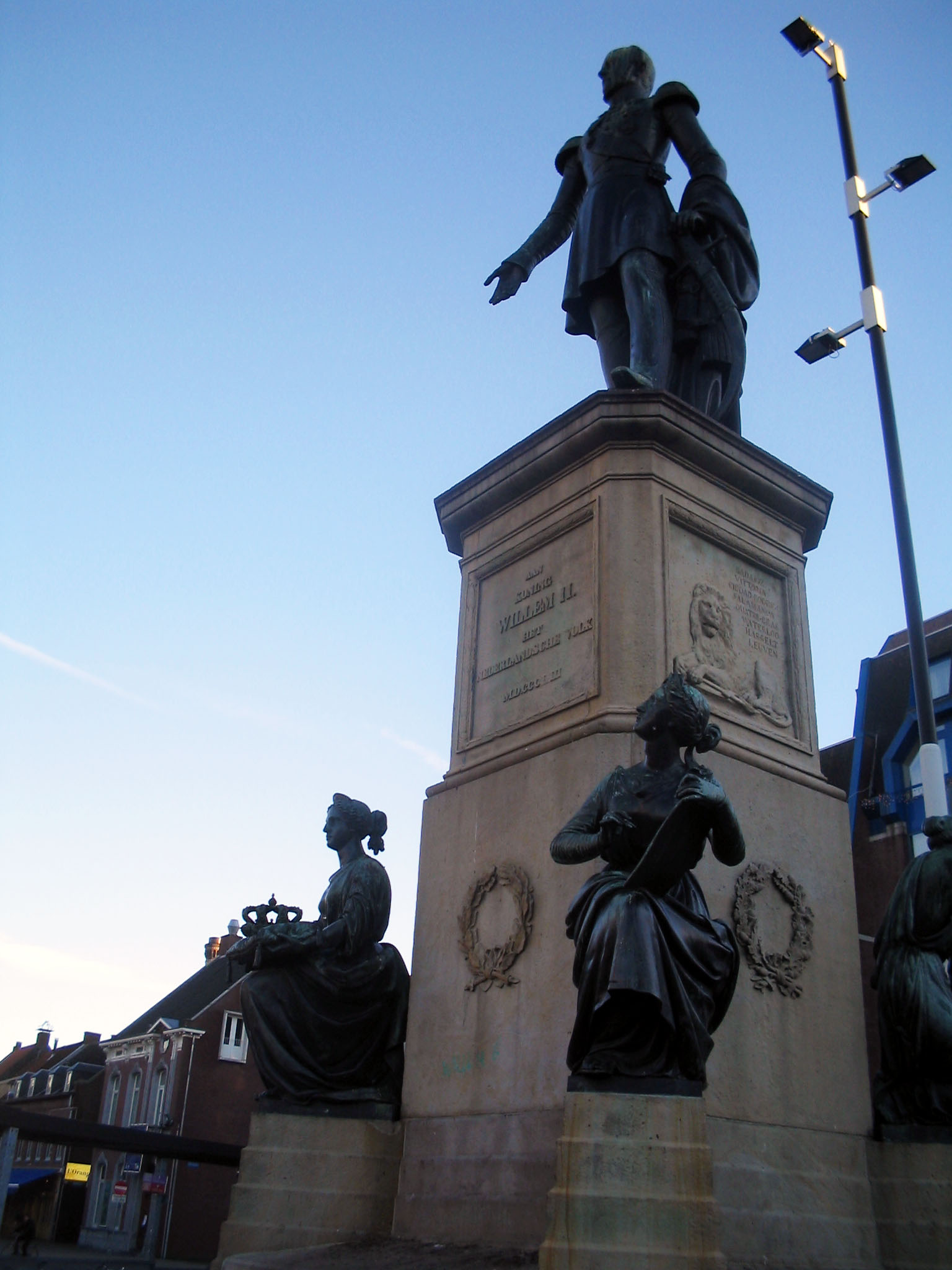
The statue of Willem II

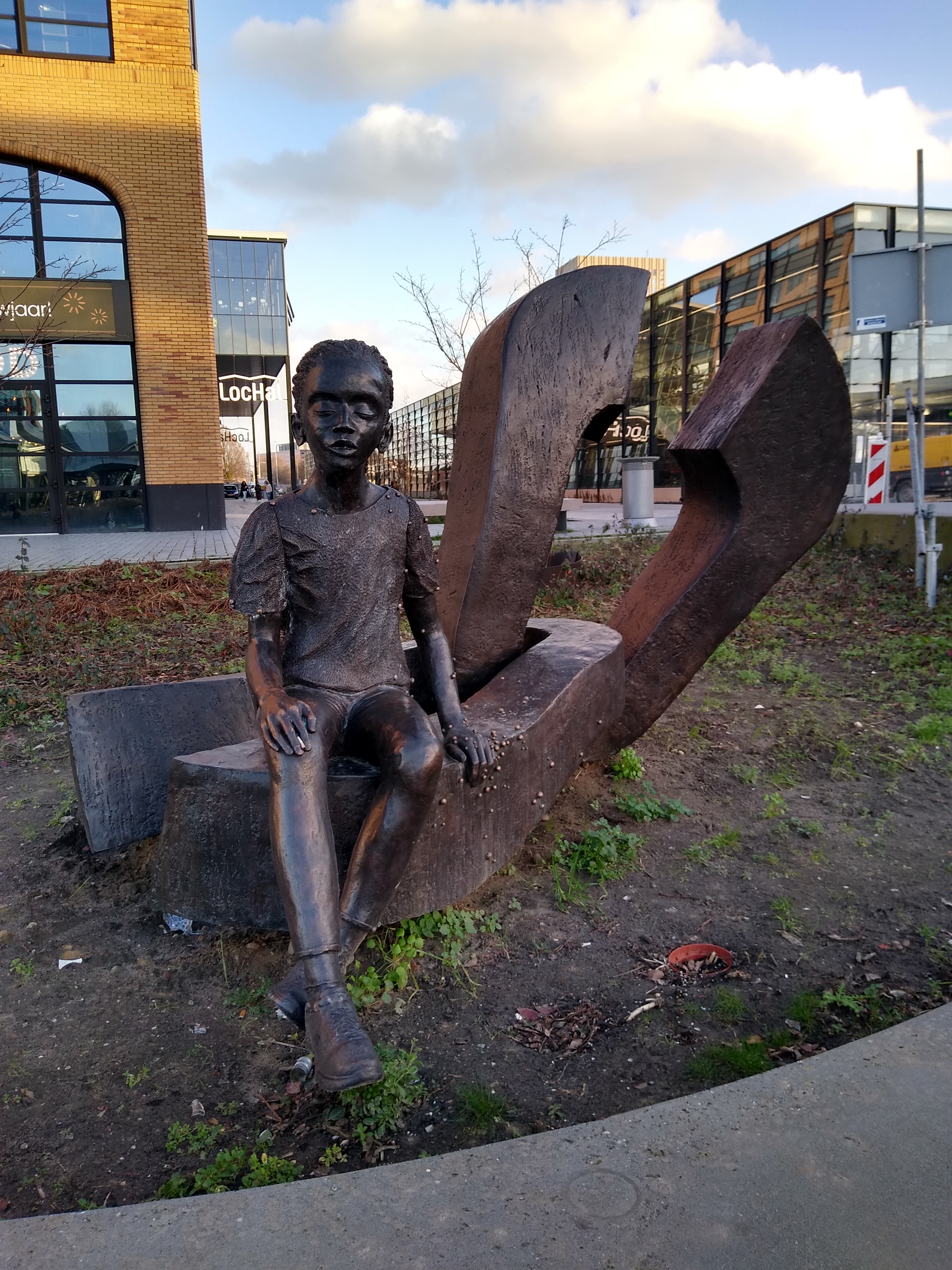
Slavery memorial in Tilburg

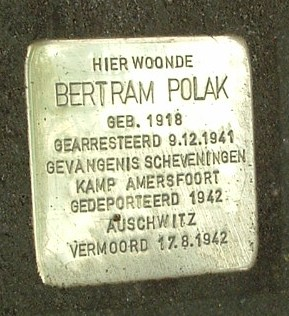
A Stolperstein in Tilburg

Tilburg's open air art is mostly supported by KORT (Kunst in Open Ruimte Tilburg, Dutch for Art in Open Space Tilburg). One example is the turning house on the Hasseltrotonde, a roundabout, was erected in 2008.

Besides being responsible for newer, modern art, KORT also gives information about older works of art, like the Willem II statue on the Heuvel.

=== Festival city, music ===
The city of Tilburg hosts many festivals, such as Incubate, Festival Mundial (world culture), Stranger Than Paranoia (jazz), Tilburg Students Festival, and Roadburn Festival. 013 is a modern pop-centre. Paradox is a club for experimental jazz and improvised music. Fontys University of Applied Sciences started a pop academy in the beginning of the 21st century, and students often perform on local stages.

=== Museums ===
Tilburg has a renowned museum of contemporary art, De Pont, which houses works from artists such as Ai Weiwei, Anish Kapoor and Richard Serra. The museum, which opened in 1992, is housed in a former wool mill, an important piece of Tilburg's history. Anish Kapoor's artwork Skymirror is displayed on the square in front of the museum. Also in the field of contemporary arts is the SEA Foundation Tilburg, an internationally oriented art foundation, exhibition space and artist residence for artists, writers and curators. Tilburg also hosts a significant textile museum, offering not only a historical view in its former factory, but also a laboratory for design, production and development of textile as a material. It opened in 1958.

There is also the Natuurmuseum Brabant (Brabant Museum of Nature), dedicated to natural history. Originally named the Natural History Museum of Tilburg (Natuurhistorisch Museum Tilburg), the museum was established in 1935. The museum was originally housed in the former intendant residence of King Willem II, but moved in 1985 to its current location, a former technical school near the railway station. The collection consists of a large variety of stuffed animals, animals kept in formaldehyde, dried plants, stones, minerals, fossils and archaeological artfacts.

The Museum Scryption was a former museum in Tilburg with the main theme 'written communication'. It closed in 2011.

==== Tilburg City Museum ====
The Tilburg City Museum (Stadsmuseum Tilburg) does not have a fixed location. It manages the city's heritage collection and creates exhibitions at diverse venues. For example, the Peerke Donders Pavilion and Vincent's Drawing Room.

- Vincent's drawing room: In Vincent's Drawing Room you will find a museum room where the authentic room of Vincent van Gogh has been recreated and a modern drawing room with drawing computers. Vincent van Gogh lived and studied several years in Tilburg. The house where he lived can't be visited. The square where the house is located has been redesigned in the Van Gogh style.
- Peerke Donders Pavilion: A museum for charity, in honor of Petrus Donders.

The collection that Stadsmuseum Tilburg manages is part of Tilburg City Collection. In addition, it manages the Memory of Tilburg with more than 4400 stories.

=== Parks and forests ===
Parks and forests provide inhabitants from the Tilburg area with recreation. The Leijpark and Reeshofpark are the largest parks. Leijpark was famous for Festival Mundial and lies next to St. Elisabeth hospital and a monastery, the Cenakel. Reeshofpark was created in the late 1990s, including some restaurants opened in 2011. Some older parks include Wilhelminapark in Oud-Noord, are built on the square of the former herd place Veldhoven. Tilburg offers, in comparison to other top-ten cities in the Netherlands, the most forest area. In the municipality, Tilburg has the Wandelbos, a forest south of the similarly named neighbourhood in Tilburg-West, the Oude Warande, the Kaaistoep, a forest of 4.5 km^{2}, and partially, Huis Ter Heide in the northwest of Tilburg, a 6.5 km^{2}-sized natural redevelopment area. Out of the municipality, there's a national park called Loonse en Drunense Duinen which includes dunes of drift sand from the west coast.

=== Sports ===
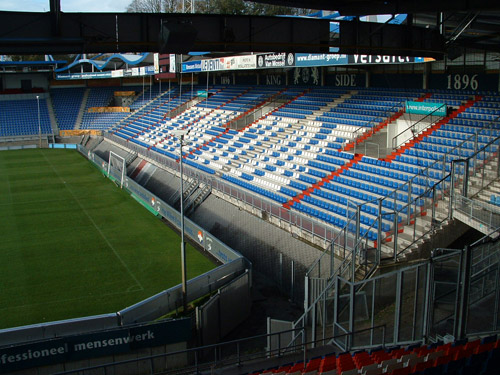
Koning Willem II Stadion

The local football team is Willem II, named in remembrance of King William II.

Tilburg Ten Miles is an annual road running competition held in Tilburg.

Students' sports like rowing and hockey are popular as well. Tilburg hosts three field hockey clubs that play in top national leagues.

Tilburg has the ice skating complex IJssportcentrum Tilburg, including the indoor 400 m speed skating rink Ireen Wüst IJsbaan. Within the speed skating rink there's an ice hockey field. Adjacent is the ice hockey arena where Tilburg Trappers plays its home games. Tilburg Trappers dominated the Eredivisie (Dutch Premier League) for years before moving to the Oberliga, the third tier of ice hockey in Germany.

In 2024 bandy was introduced, including the founding of a new club, Bandy Vereniging Tilburg. At the Women's Bandy World Championship in 2025, three players from Tilburg were part of the Dutch team.

=== Attractions ===
Tilburg is the closest major settlement to the Efteling amusement park, located 11km away from the city centre. Located within the city itself is Zoo De Oliemeulen, a small family run animal attraction housing over 1,000 different animals.

== Transport ==
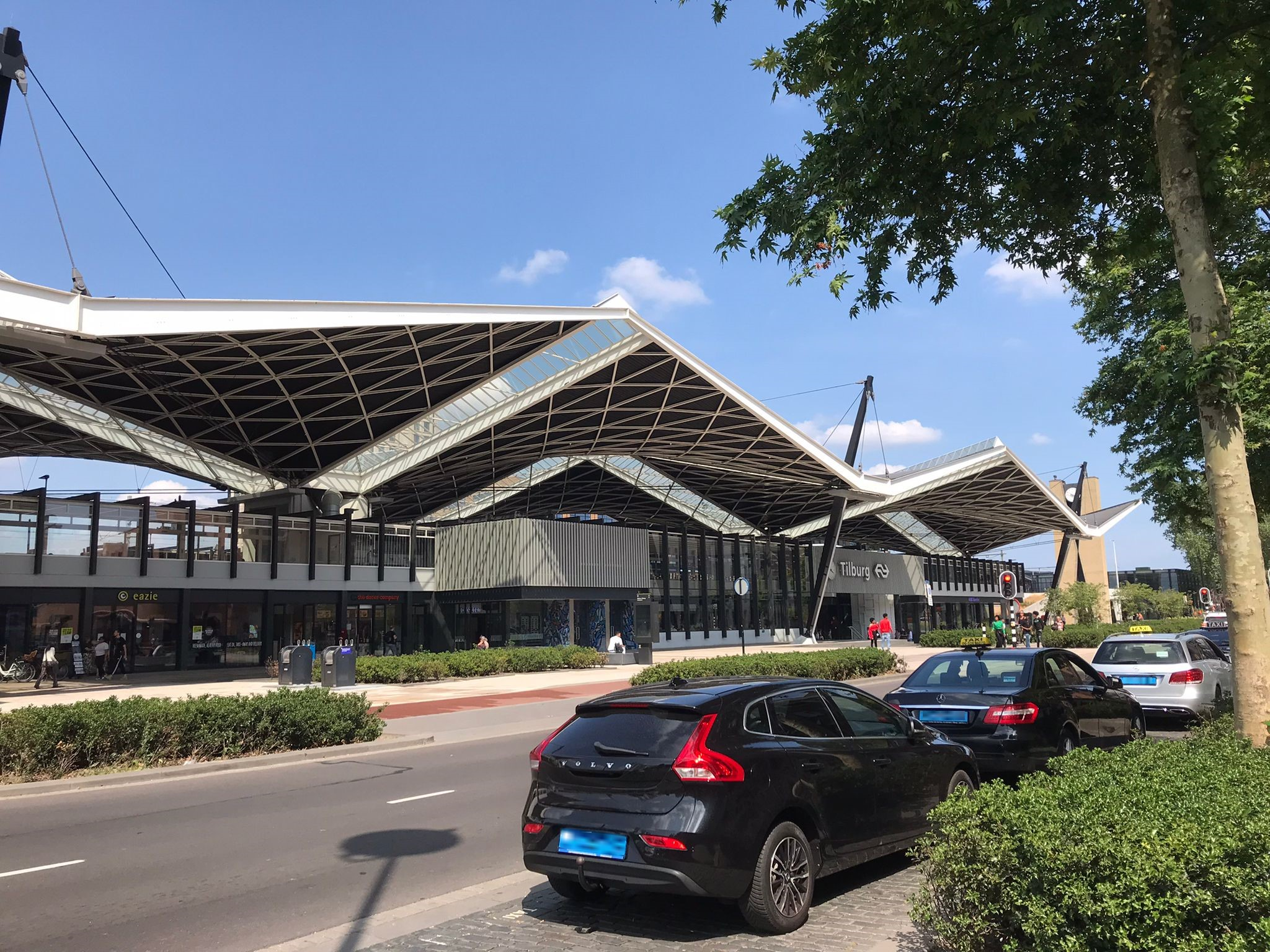
Tilburg Railway Station

Tilburg has three railway stations: Tilburg (Centraal), Tilburg Universiteit and Tilburg Reeshof. The latter was built to connect the then-latest district of Tilburg, the Reeshof. Intercity trains only stop at Tilburg (centraal). The name of Tilburg Universiteit Station was Tilburg West from its construction in 1968 to December 2010. A fourth railway station is planned for Berkel-Enschot, also in the municipality of Tilburg and getting more absorbed into Tilburg. Until 1938, Berkel-Enschot had its own train station. Udenhout, lying further northeast in the municipality, also had its train station until 1938. Both stations are on the line to 's-Hertogenbosch.

The Tilburg city and local buses are operated by Arriva. The city experimented from 2005 to 2008 with free public transport for children and 55+ people. Before Arriva, the buses were operated by Veolia, and before that by BBA (abbreviation for Brabants(ch)e Buurtspoorwegen en Autobussen). The city is also served by an hourly bus service to the Belgian city of Turnhout, operated by De Lijn.

Tilburg has an extensive bicycle path network called Sternet-Routes. The first bicycle path of this network was built between the city center and the university in 1975. From the mid-1990s, multiple bicycle paths (rather than lanes along the road) have been built. Older lanes are paved by tiles, but newer paths are largely asphalt. For this network of bicycle paths, some new tunnels were built under the railway that crosses the city.

Tilburg is, unlike other Dutch cities of a similar size, connected by only one national motorway, the A58 / E312 (to Breda and Eindhoven). An outer beltway, consisting of two provincial 2x2-roads and the A58, was finished in May 2012. Although the outer beltway is fully navigable, the Burgemeester Bechtweg, which was built initially as a two-lane (one per direction) road, was finished in 2013. Two other routes are of considerable importance for Tilburg: the A261/N261 to Waalwijk and the A65/N65 to 's-Hertogenbosch. Neither is a complete motorway, and both experience bottlenecks. Various plans exist to build both to higher standards, with the N261 improved in 2015 to remove all traffic lights beyond Tilburg.

== Twin towns – sister cities ==
Tilburg is twinned with:

- Changzhou, China
- Lublin, Poland
- Matagalpa, Nicaragua
- Minamiashigara, Japan
- Same, Tanzania
- Zemun, Serbia
- Taksony, Hungary

== Notable people from Tilburg ==
=== The arts ===
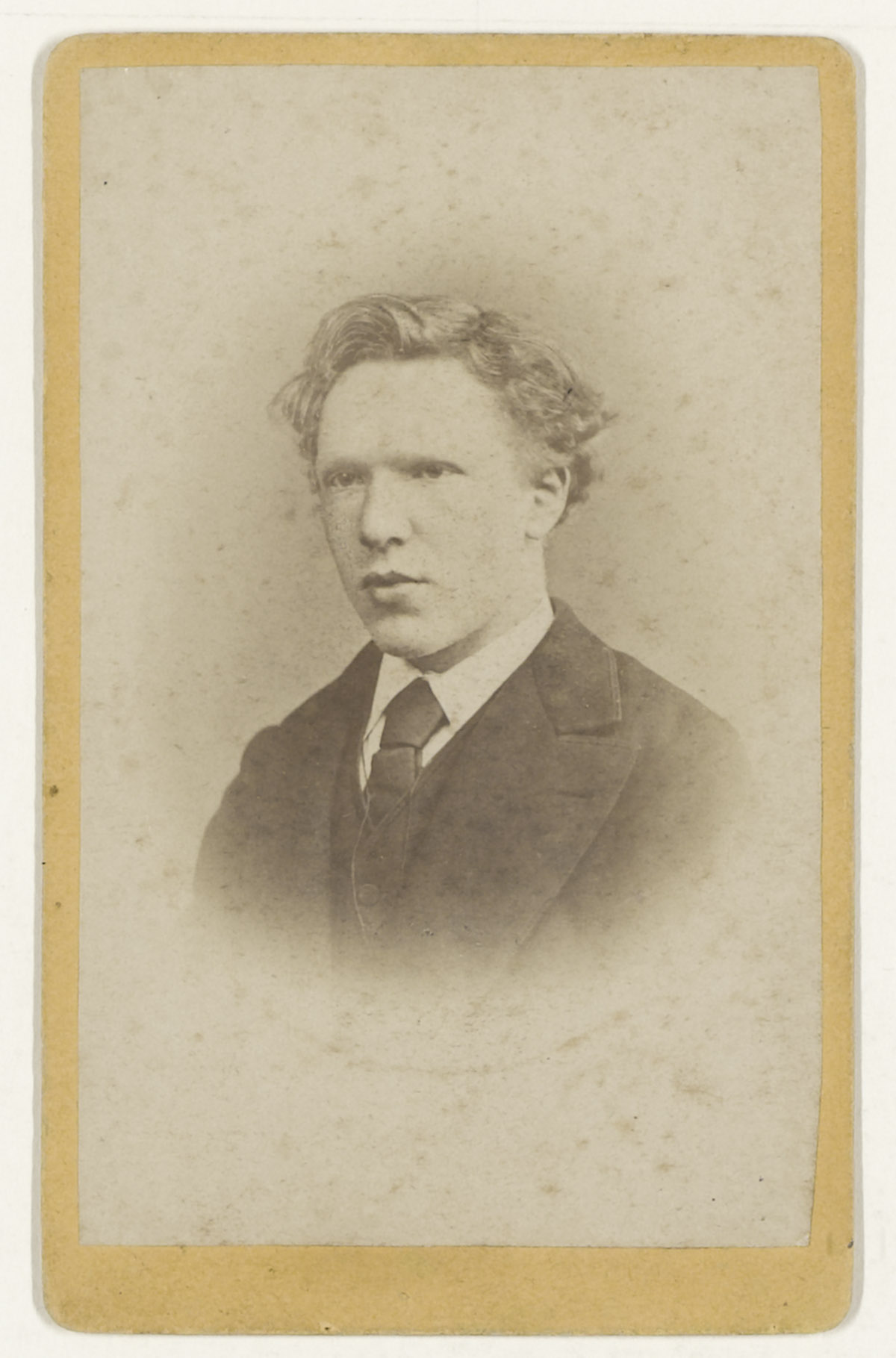
Vincent van Gogh, 1873

- Gerard van Spaendonck (1746–1822) & Cornelis van Spaendonck (1756–1839), painters
- Joseph August Knip (1777–1847) & Henriëtte Geertruida Knip (1783–1842), painters
- Vincent van Gogh (1853–1890) attended the King Willem II school, where he was taught painting
- Ludolph Berkemeier (1864–1930), a landscape and cityscape painter
- Bernardus Weber (1912–1996), a sculptor, draughtsman, and pastellist
- Theo l' Herminez (1921–1997), a painter, moved from impressionism to realism
- Frans de Kok (1924–2011), a musician, conducted the winning Dutch entry to the 1969 Eurovision Song Contest
- Theo van de Sande (born 1947), cinematographer
- Ruud Janssen (born 1959), a fluxus and mail artist
- Leonard Retel Helmrich (1959–2023), a cinematographer and film director
- Arjen Anthony Lucassen (born 1960), a singer, songwriter with Ayreon and Star One
- Marc-Marie Huijbregts (born 1964), a comedian, actor and TV presenter
- Richard Rijnvos (born 1964), a composer
- Guus Meeuwis (born 1972), a singer-songwriter, attended Tilburg University
- Ruud Jolie (born 1976), the lead guitarist of the symphonic metal band Within Temptation
- Tarik Azzougarh (born 1979), stage name Cilvaringz, rapper affiliated with Wu-Tang Clan
- Joris Oprins (born 1980), an animation director
- Floor Jansen (born 1981), a singer and songwriter with symphonic metal band Nightwish
- Daan Janzing (born 1981), producer and guitarist with the Dark rock band My Favorite Scar.
- Firebeatz, an EDM duo consisting of Tim Benjamin Smulders (born 1985) and Jurre van Doeselaar (born 1987)
- Bassjackers, an EDM duo consisting of Marlon Flohr and Ralph van Hilst
- Maxim Anokhin (born 1988), a Ukrainian-Dutch music producer and DJ, known as Limewax, who relocated to Tilburg at the age of 11

=== Public service ===
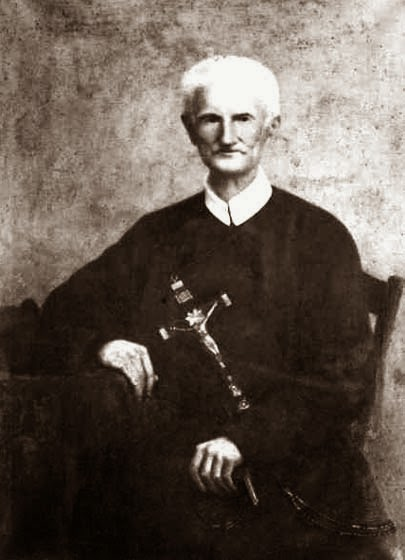
Peerke Donders, 1880s

- Bl. Peerke Donders (1807–1887), Roman Catholic missionary, cared for the lepers of Batavia, Suriname; beatified in 1982.
- Franciscus Janssens (1881–1950), the 76th General Abbot of the Common Observance
- Carl Romme (1896–1980), a politician and jurist
- Norbert Schmelzer (1921–2008), a politician, diplomat, economist and Minister
- Ernst Hirsch Ballin (born 1950), a retired politician and jurist, lives in Tilburg
- Henk Krol (born 1950), a journalist, publisher, entrepreneur and politician
- Yvonne van Rooy (born 1951), a retired politician, MEP, diplomat and businesswoman
- Roger van Boxtel (born 1954), a retired politician, now CEO of Dutch Railways

=== Science & business ===
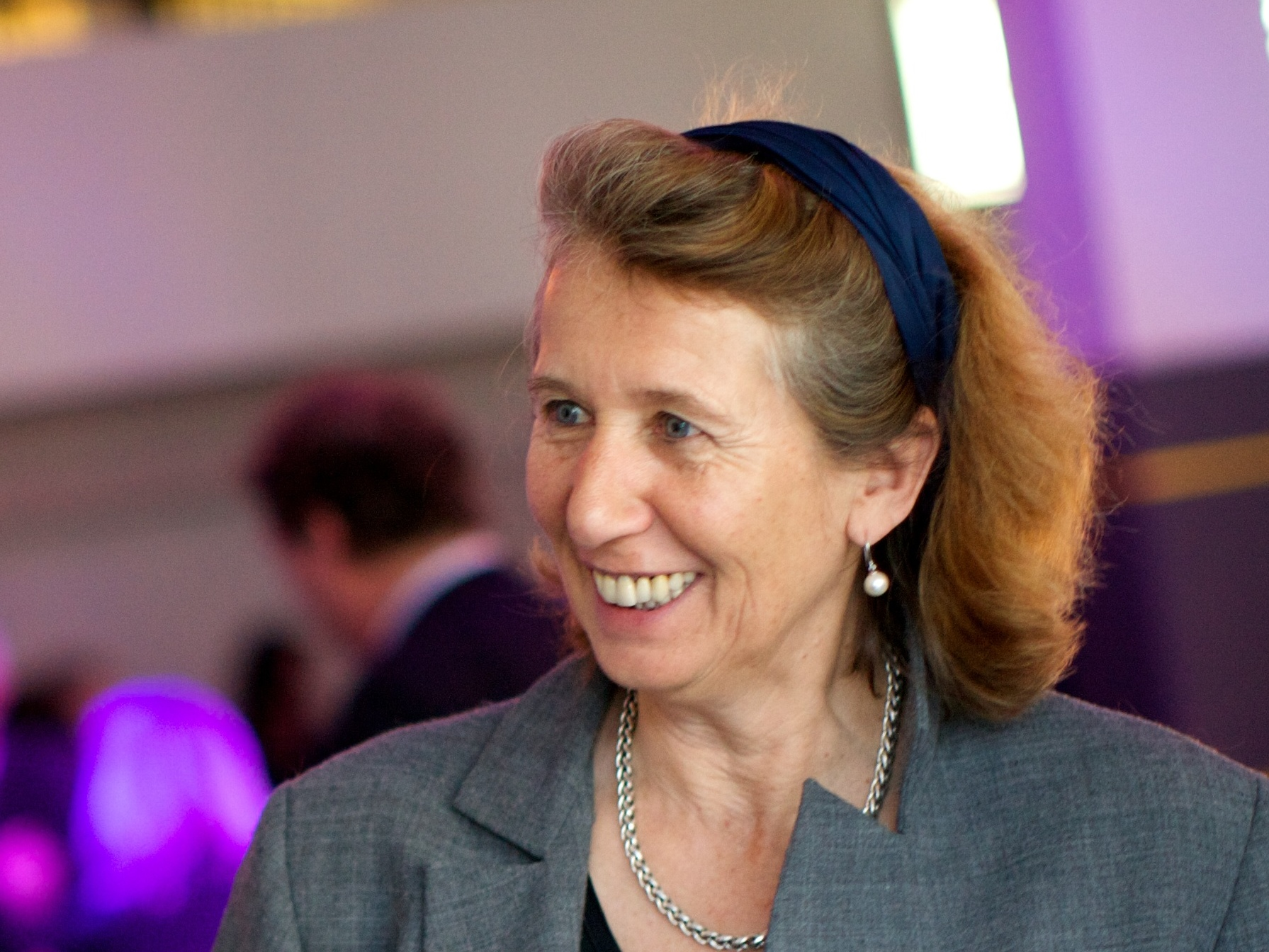
Caroline Nevejan 2014

- Franciscus Donders (1818–1889), an ophthalmologist
- Eduard Jan Dijksterhuis (1892–1965), a historian of science
- Bart le Blanc (born 1946), a economist in public finance, banking and asset management
- Henri Termeer (1946–2017), a biotechnology executive and entrepreneur
- Jozien Bensing (1950–2026), a clinical psychologist and academic
- Marc van Roosmalen (born 1947), Dutch Brazilian primatologist (elected as one of the "Heroes of the Planet" by Time magazine in 2000)
- Marijn Dekkers (born 1957), a former pharmaceutical businessman, CEO of Bayer AG 2010 to 2016
- Caroline Nevejan (born 1958), Chief Science Officer with the City of Amsterdam
- Ron Heeren (born 1965), professor specializing in mass spectrometry imaging
- Michael van Poppel (born 1989), the founder and President of BNO News

=== Sport ===
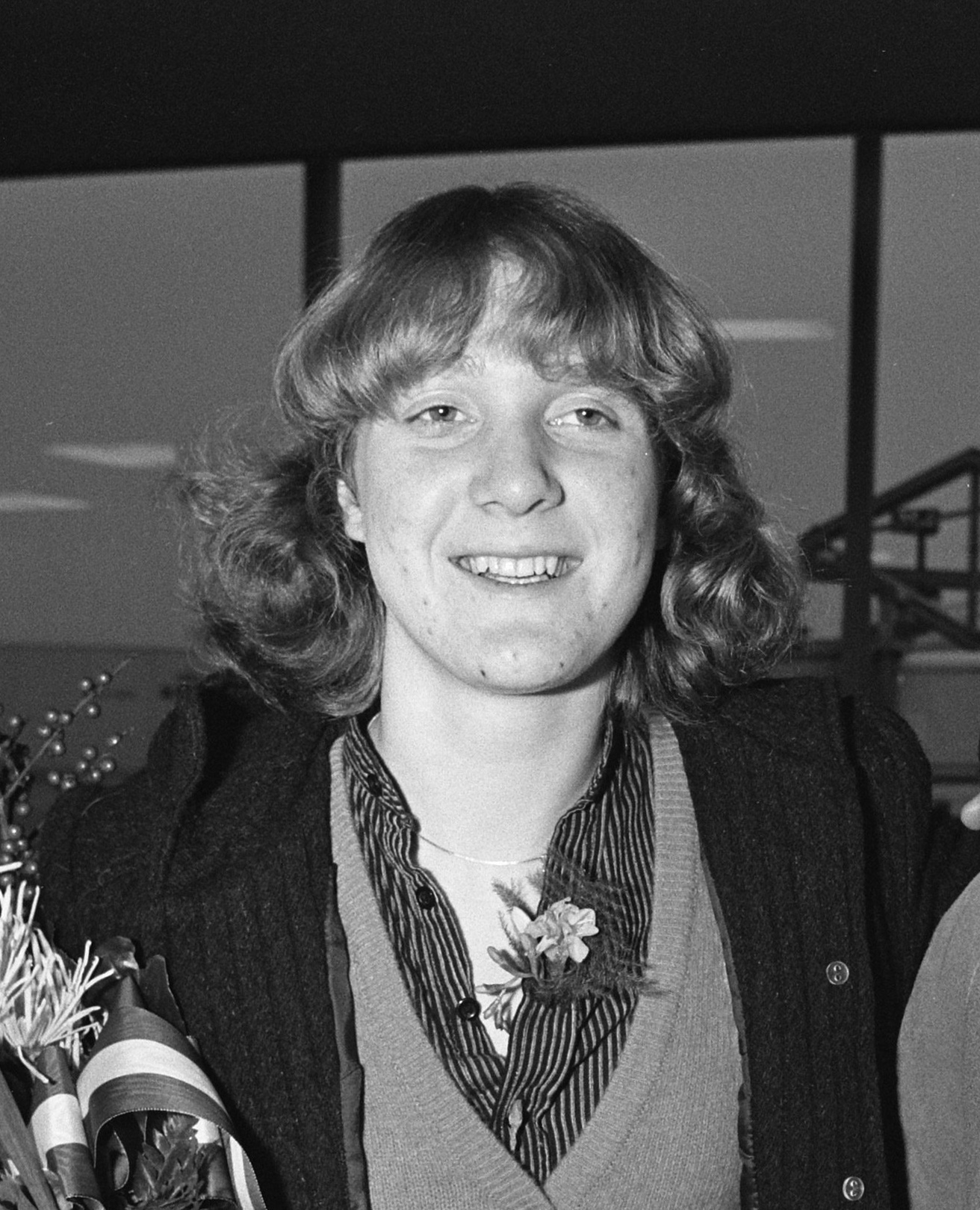
Anita Staps, 1980

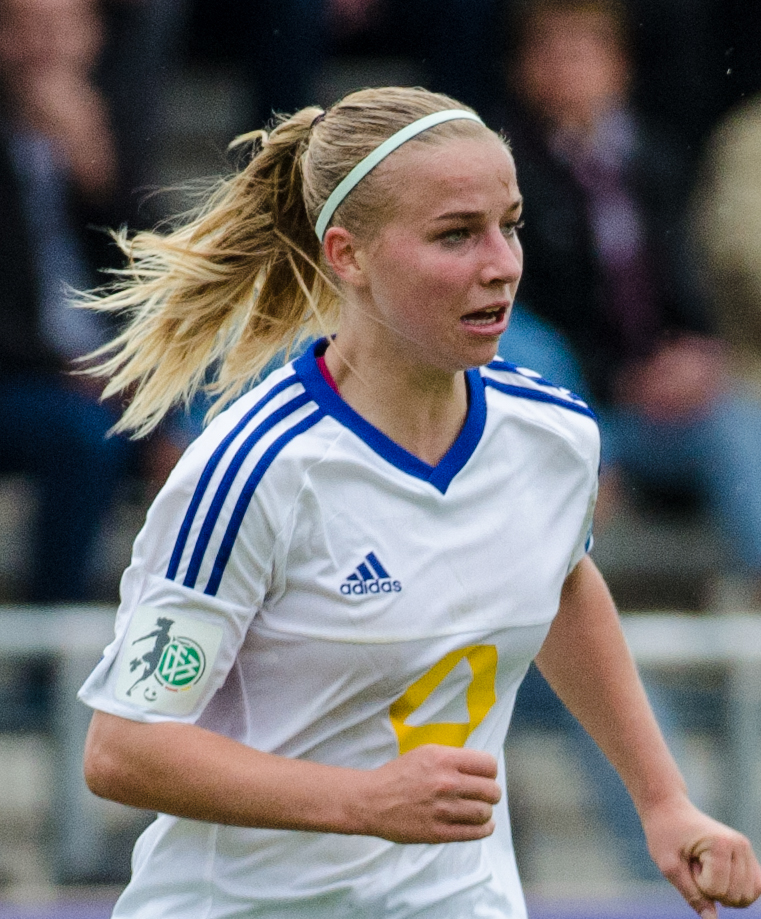
Jackie Groenen, 2015

- Jan Pijnenburg (1906–1979), track cyclist, team silver medallist at the 1928 Summer Olympics
- Toon Becx (1920−2013), a Dutch footballer with 329 caps with Willem II
- Toon Ebben (1930–2011), a Dutch equestrian, competed at the 1976 Summer Olympics
- Toon van Helfteren (born 1951), a Dutch former basketball player, current coach of Feyenoord Basketball and coach of the Dutch national basketball team 2013 to 2019.
- Bud Brocken (1957–2025), a Dutch former professional footballer with 512 club caps
- Anita Staps (born 1961), a retired judoka, world title holder in 1980
- Jean-Paul van Poppel (born 1962), a former Dutch racing cyclist
- John Lammers (born 1963), a football manager with Esbjerg fB and former player with 433 club caps
- Bas Rutten (born 1965), a Dutch-American actor and retired mixed martial artist
- Ageeth Boomgaardt (born 1972), a Dutch former field hockey defender, 192 international matches for the Netherlands, and team bronze and silver medallist at the Olympic Games
- Remy Bonjasky (born 1976), a Surinamese-Dutch former kickboxer
- Floris Evers (born 1983), a field hockey player, team silver medallist at the 2004 and 2012 Summer Olympics
- Mike van der Zanden (born 1987), a Dutch paraplegic swimmer, bronze medallist in the 2004 and 2008 Summer Paralympics
- Margot van Geffen (born 1989), a field hockey player, team gold and silver medallist at the 2012 and 2016 Summer Olympics
- Benito van de Pas (born 1993) is a Dutch darts player
- Jackie Groenen (born 1994), a Dutch footballer and former judoka

== Gallery ==
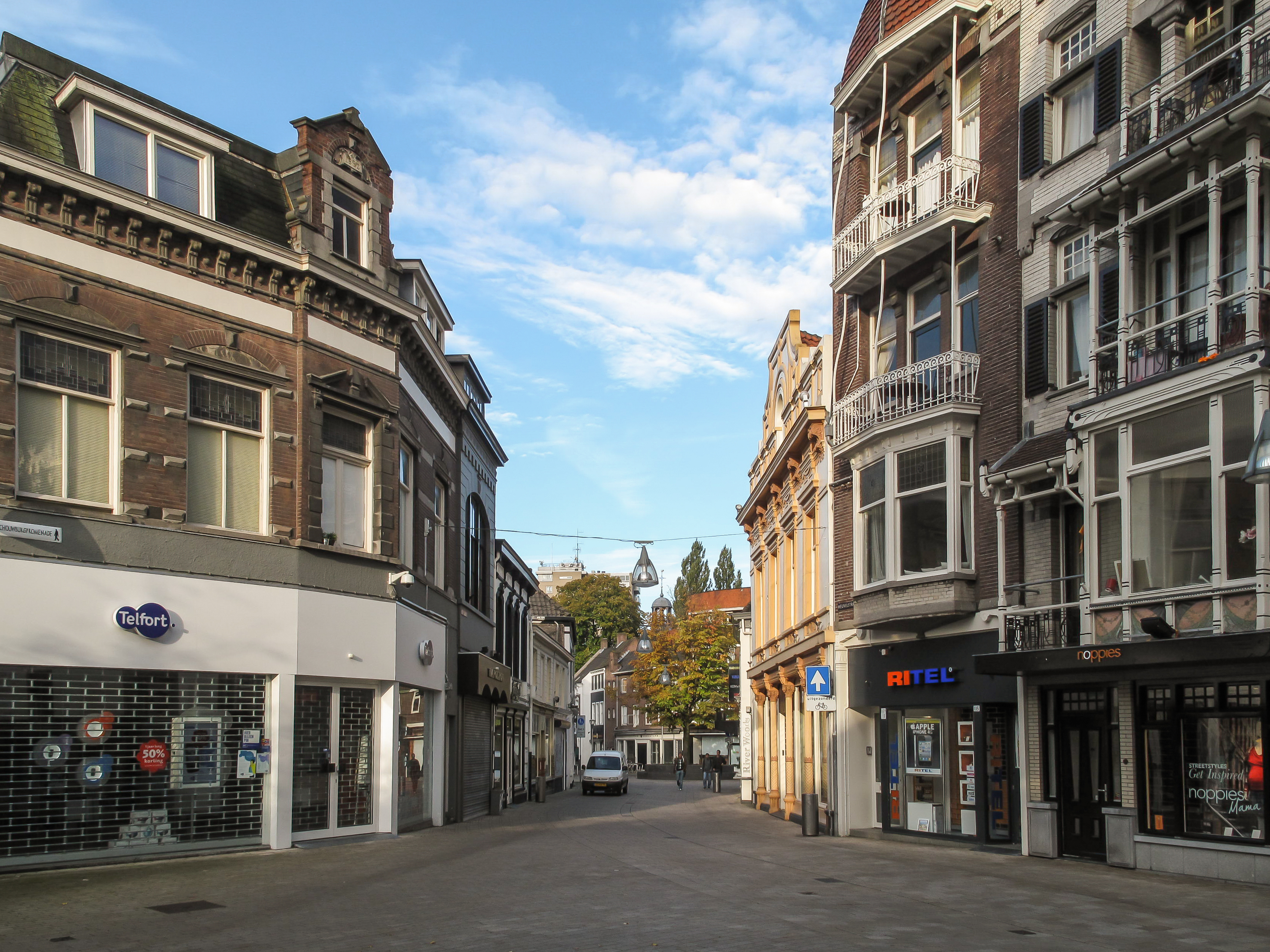
Tilburg, view at Heuvelstraat

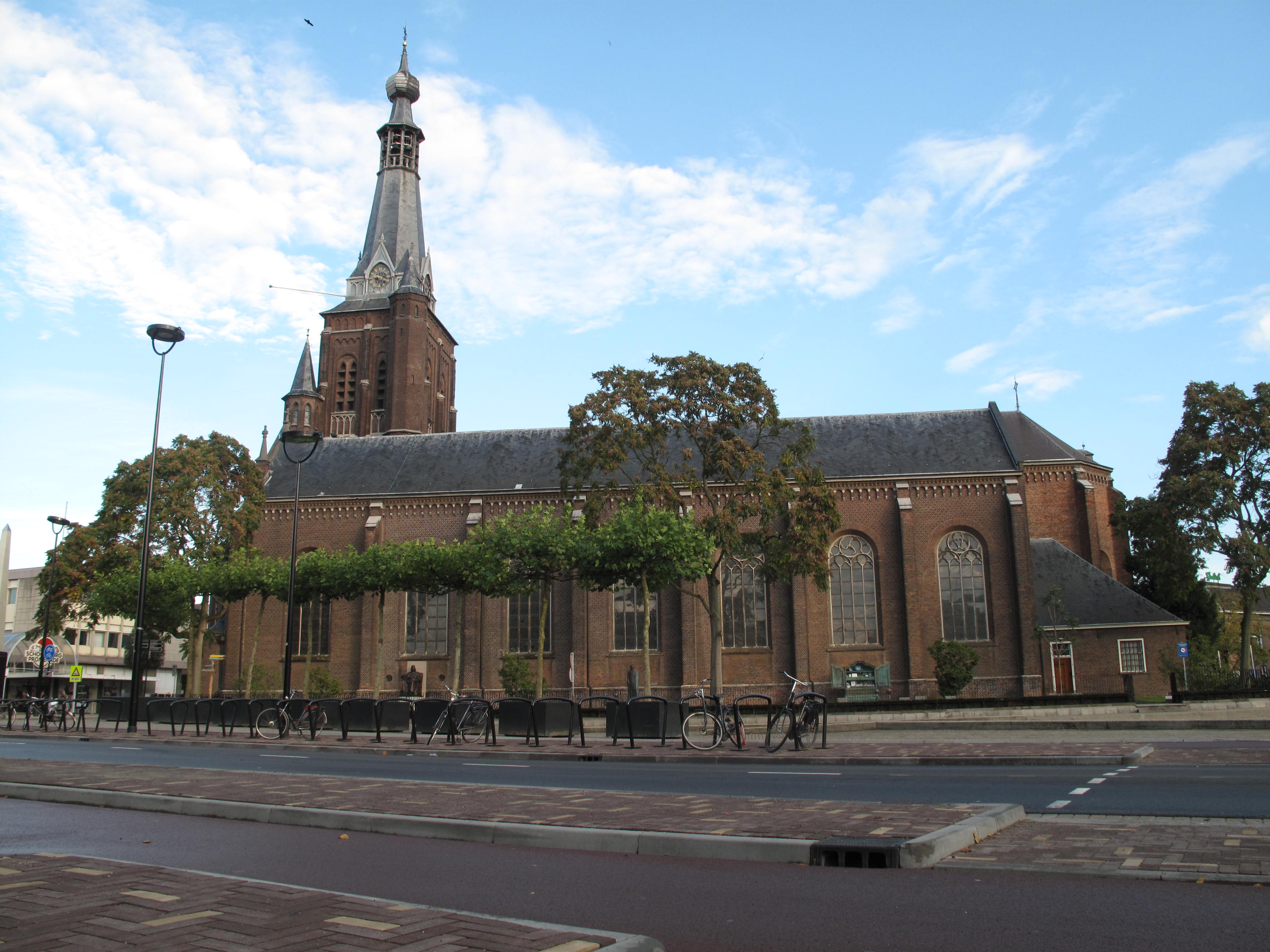
Tilburg, Saint Denis Church, known as the: Heikese Kerk

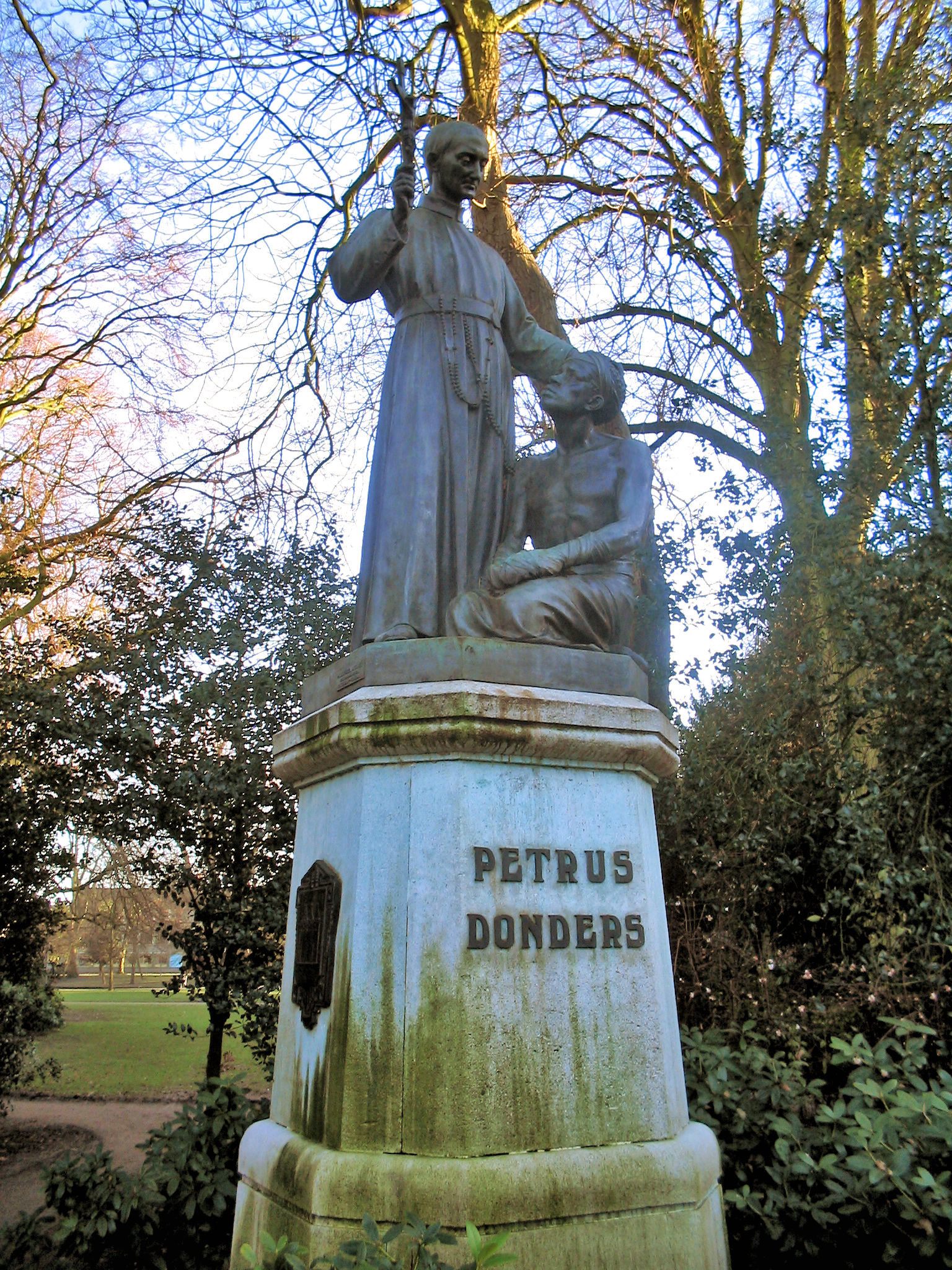
Tilburg, statue of Petrus Donders

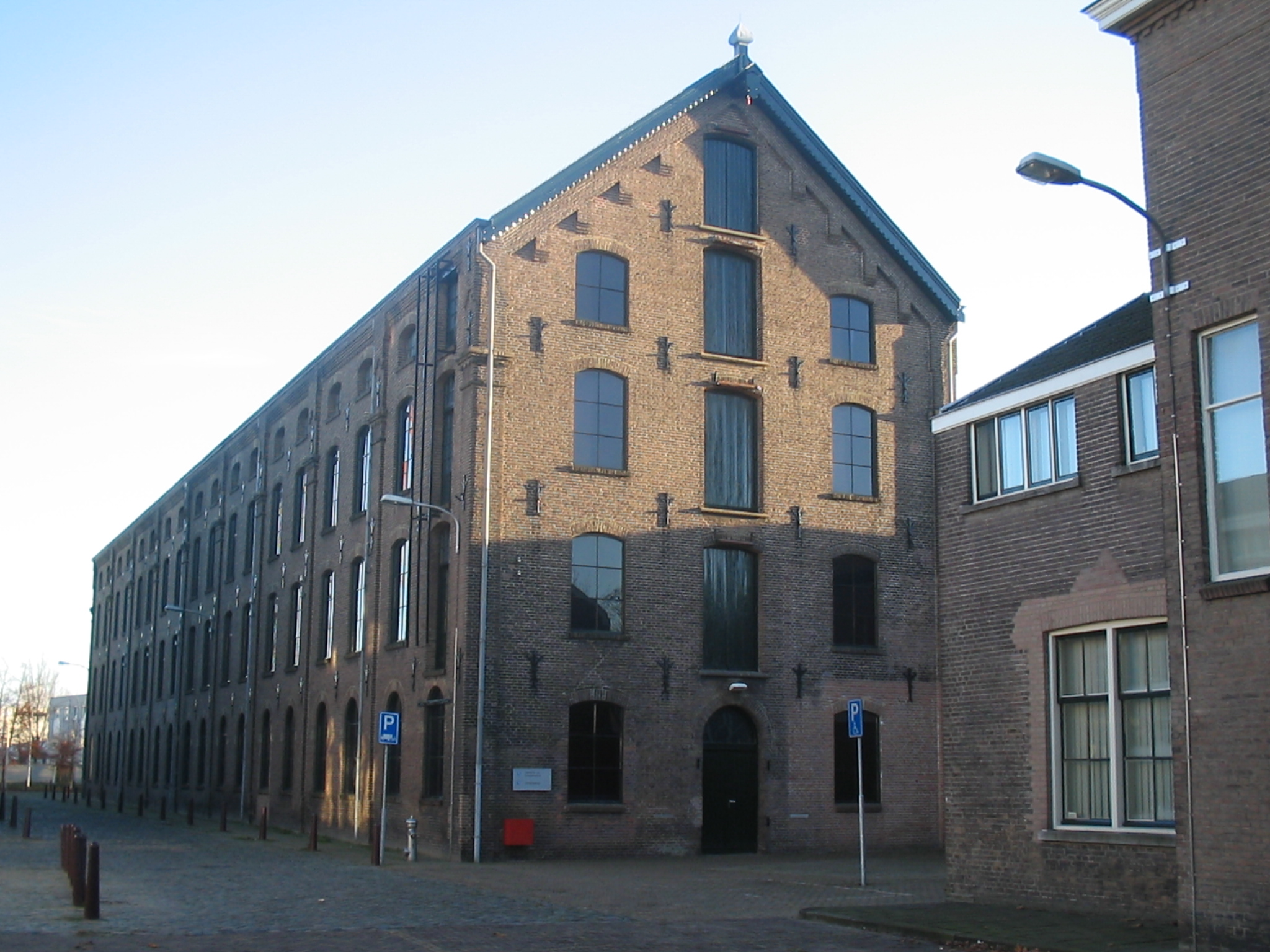
Tilburg textile museum

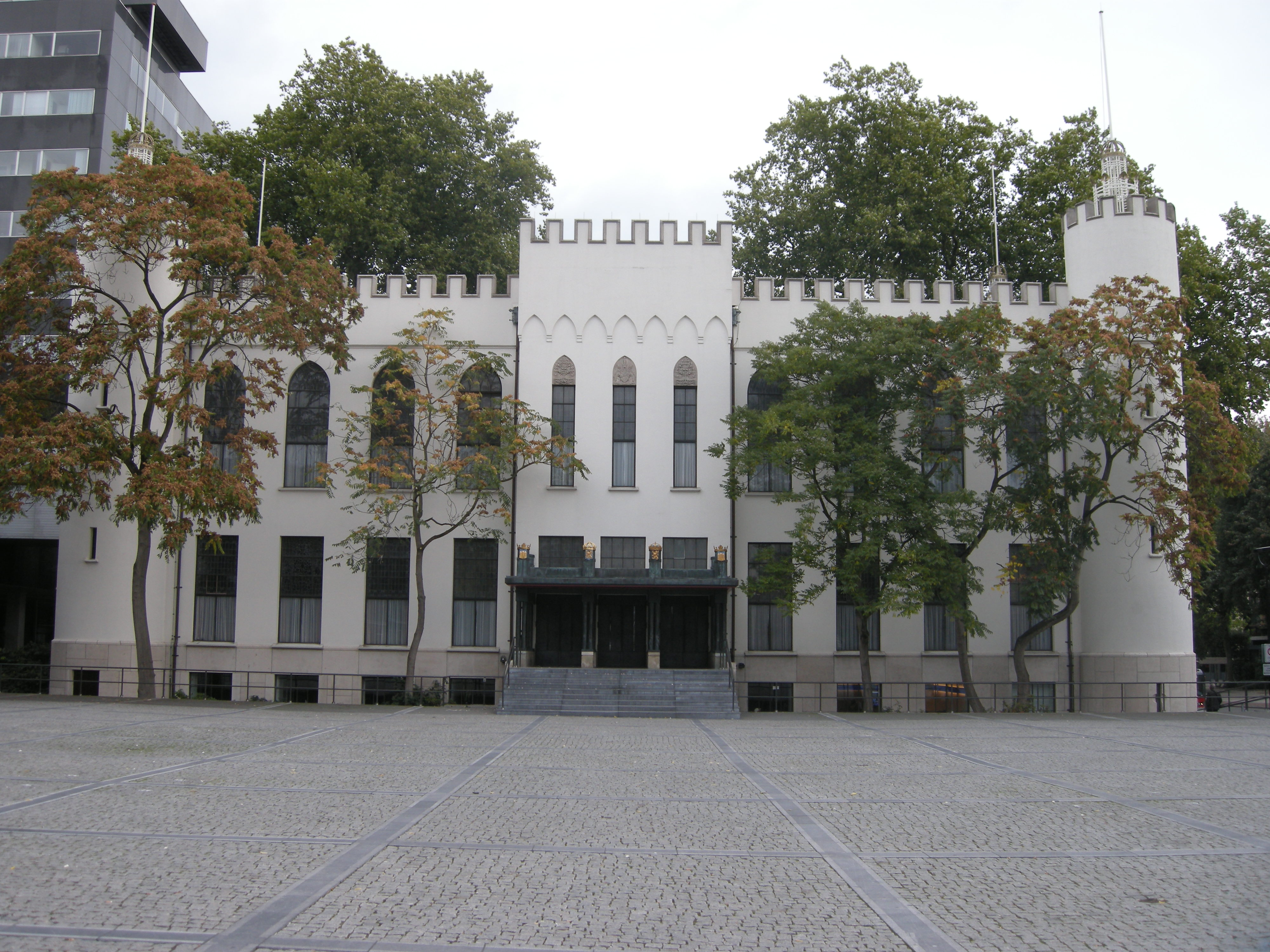
City Hall of Tilburg, called: Paleis-Raadhuis

== See also ==
- Textures
- Jewish Tilburg
- Brabantian
- Villa Mariënhof
