= Helmond Brandevoort railway station =

Railway station in the Netherlands

Helmond Brandevoort
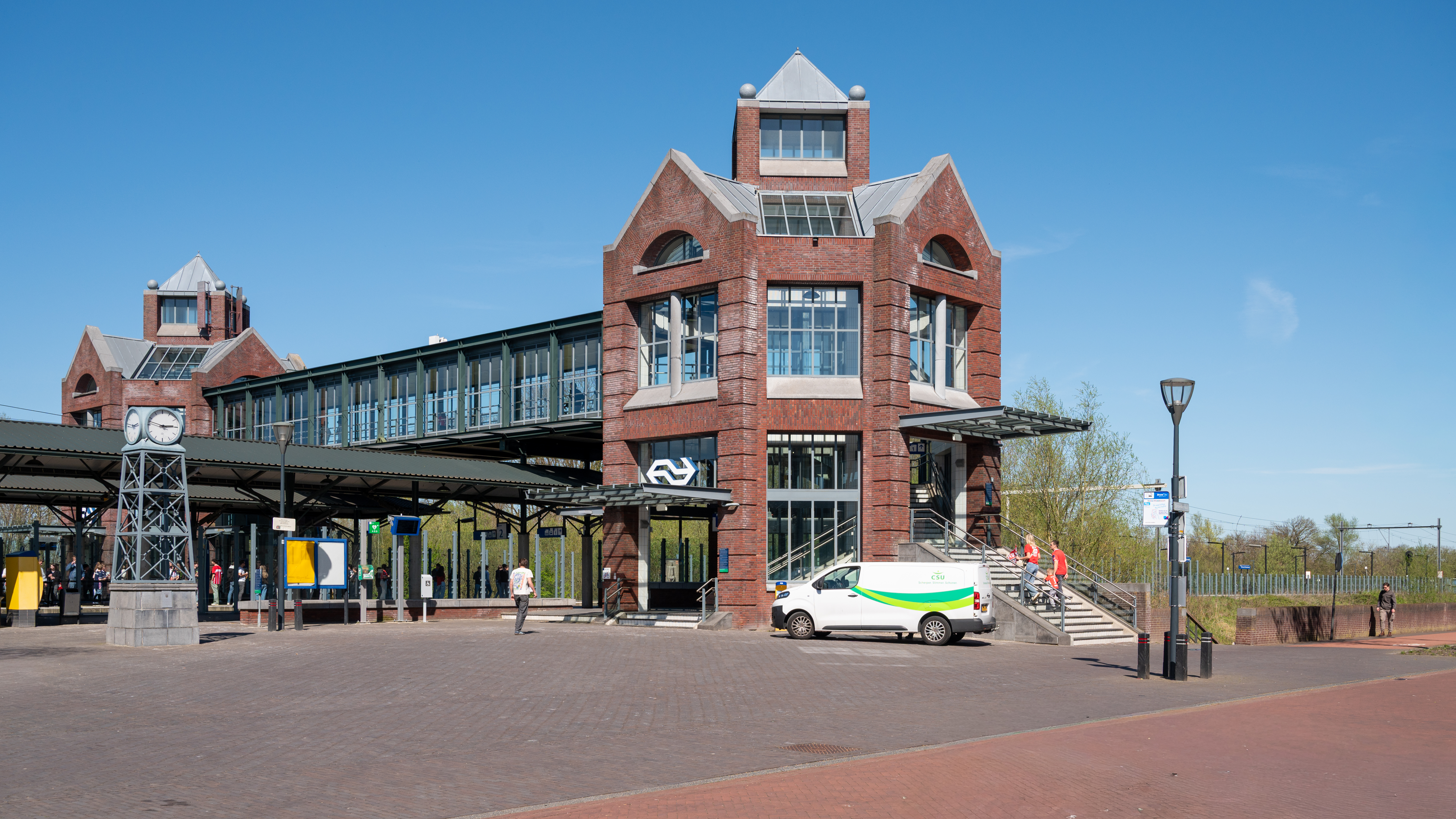

General information
- Location: Netherlands
- Coordinates: 51°27′45″N 5°36′44″E
- Line: Venlo–Eindhoven railway
- Platforms: 2

History
- Opened: 10 December 2006

Services
Preceding station	Nederlandse Spoorwegen	Following station
Eindhoven Centraal towards 's-Hertogenbosch	NS Sprinter 4400 Except AM Peak	Helmond 't Hout towards Deurne
Eindhoven Centraal towards Oss	NS Sprinter 4400 AM Peak	Helmond 't Hout towards Deurne
Location
- Location within Netherlands

Helmond Brandevoort is a railway station in Brandevoort near Helmond, Netherlands. The station opened on 10 December 2006 and is on the Venlo–Eindhoven railway. The building work was not completed and finally finished on 15 June 2007. It was built in the same style as the neighbourhood of Brandevoort.

The station has 2 platforms. Train services are operated by Nederlandse Spoorwegen.

== Train service ==
The following services calls at Helmond Brandevoort :

- 2x per hour local services (sprinter) 's-Hertogenbosch - Eindhoven - Deurne
