= 's-Hertogenbosch Oost railway station =

Railway station in the Netherlands

's-Hertogenbosch Oost
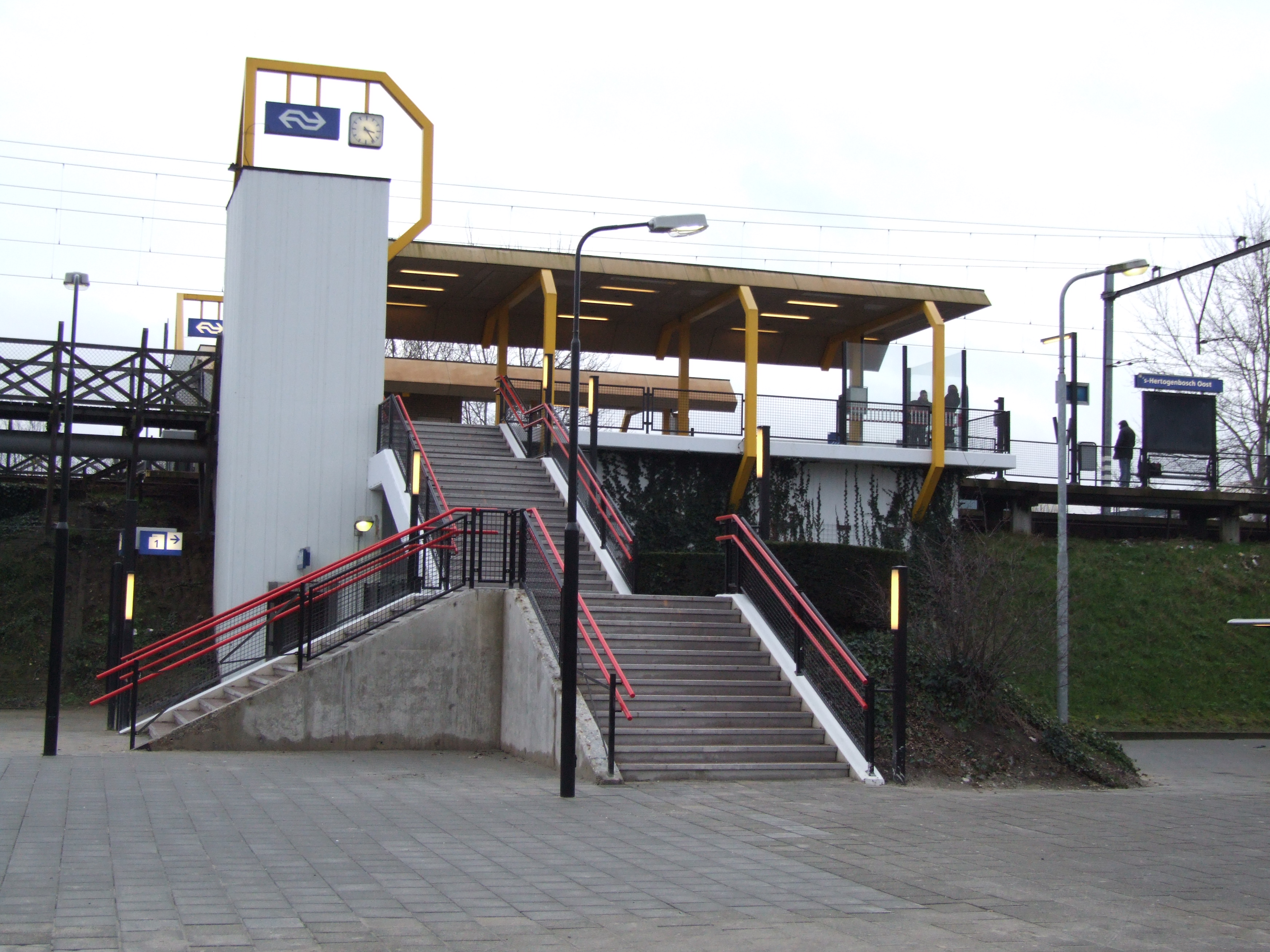
- 's-Hertogenbosch Oost railway station from the car park in front of the station.

General information
- Location: Netherlands
- Coordinates: 51°42′02″N 5°19′08″E
- Line: Tilburg–Nijmegen railway

History
- Opened: 1987

Services
Preceding station	Nederlandse Spoorwegen	Following station
's-Hertogenbosch towards Deurne	NS Sprinter 4400 AM Peak	Rosmalen towards Oss
's-Hertogenbosch towards Dordrecht	NS Sprinter 6600 Mon-Sat until 19:00	Rosmalen towards Arnhem Centraal
's-Hertogenbosch towards Dordrecht	NS Sprinter 6600 After 19:00 and Sun	Rosmalen towards Nijmegen
Location
- Location within Netherlands

's-Hertogenbosch Oost railway station serves the city of 's-Hertogenbosch in the North Brabant province of the Netherlands.

== History ==
The station was opened in 1987 and is located on the Brabantselijn (Nijmegen - Tilburg). The train services are operated by Nederlandse Spoorwegen.

The main station of 's-Hertogenbosch is 's-Hertogenbosch.

== Train services ==
The following services currently call at 's-Hertogenbosch Oost:

- 2x per hour local services (stoptrein) Nijmegen - Oss - 's-Hertogenbosch
