= Helmond 't Hout railway station =

Railway station in the Netherlands

Helmond 't Hout
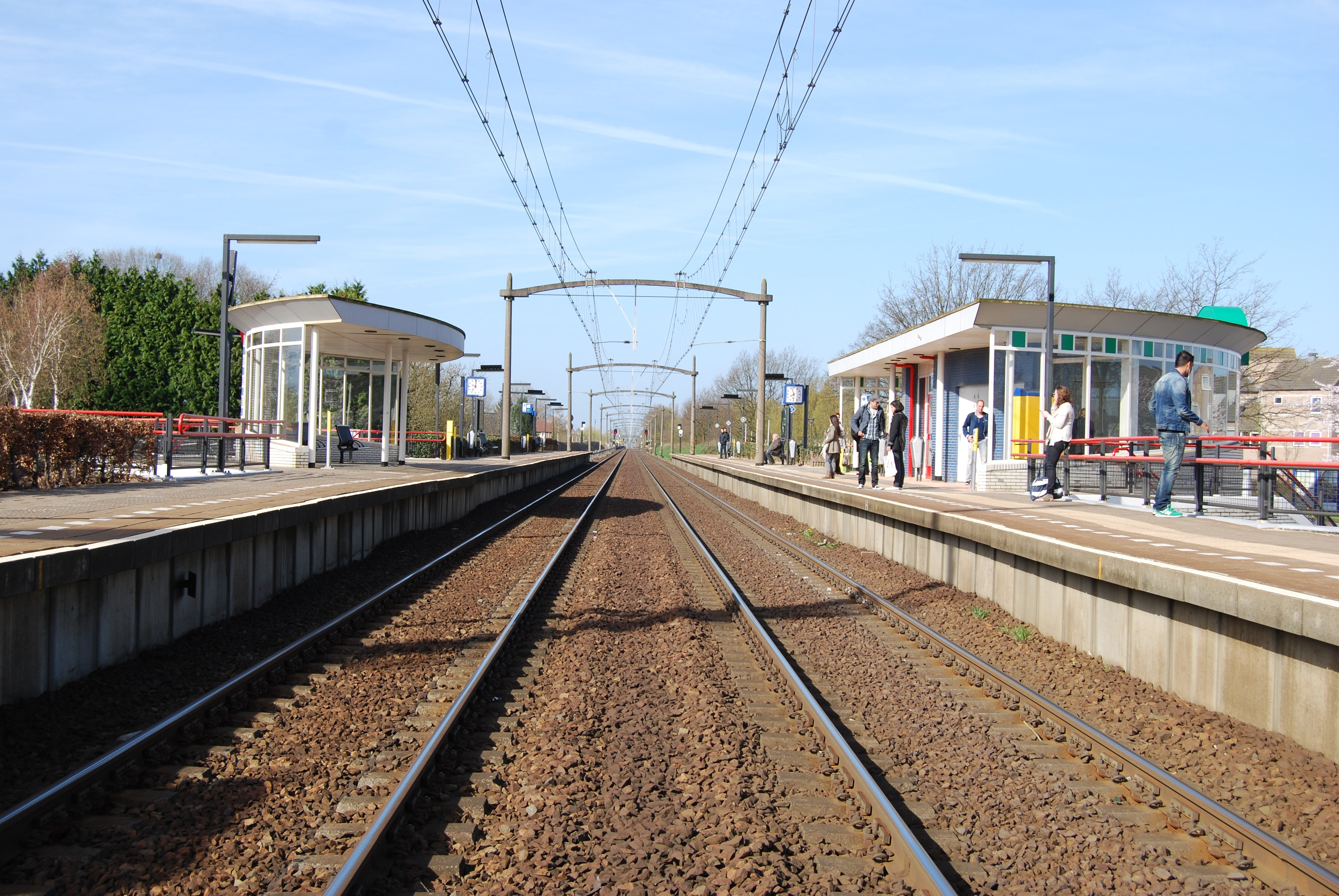

General information
- Location: Netherlands
- Coordinates: 51°28′04″N 5°37′51″E
- Line: Venlo–Eindhoven railway

History
- Opened: 1992

Services
| Preceding station | Nederlandse Spoorwegen | Following station |
|---|---|---|
| Helmond Brandevoort towards 's-Hertogenbosch | NS Sprinter 4400 Except AM Peak | Helmond towards Deurne |
| Helmond Brandevoort towards Oss | NS Sprinter 4400 AM Peak | Helmond towards Deurne |
Location
- Location within Netherlands

Helmond 't Hout is a railway station in Mierlo-Hout near Helmond, Netherlands. The station opened in 1992 and is on the Venlo–Eindhoven railway. The station has 2 platforms. Train services are operated by Nederlandse Spoorwegen.

== Train service ==
The following services stop at Helmond 't Hout:

- 2x per hour local services (stoptrein) 's-Hertogenbosch - Eindhoven - Deurne
