= Oss West railway station =

Railway station in the Netherlands

Oss West
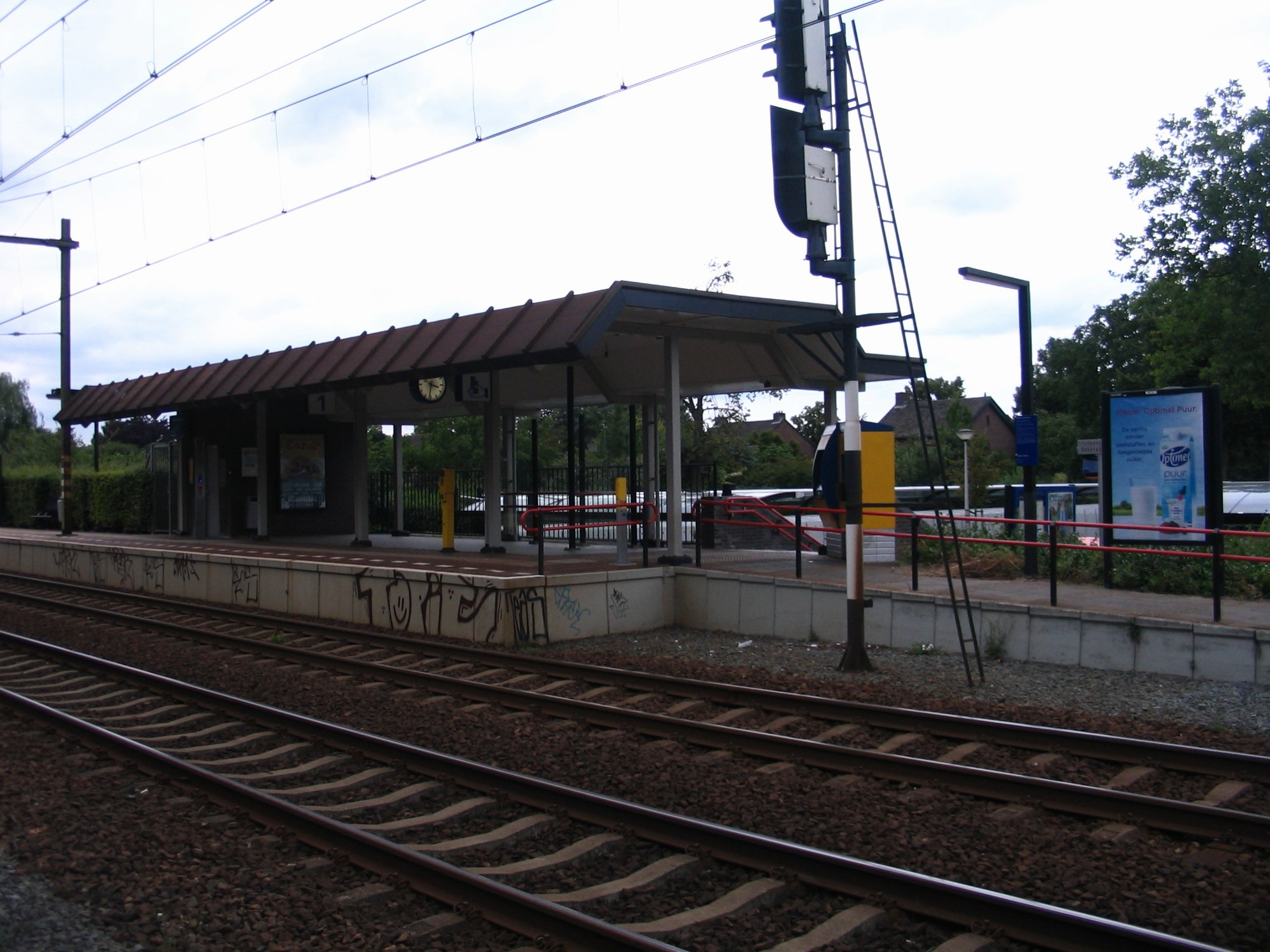

General information
- Location: Netherlands
- Coordinates: 51°45′29″N 5°30′22″E
- Line: Tilburg–Nijmegen railway

History
- Opened: 1981

Services
Preceding station	Nederlandse Spoorwegen	Following station
Rosmalen towards Deurne	NS Sprinter 4400 AM Peak	Oss Terminus
Rosmalen towards Dordrecht	NS Sprinter 6600 Mon-Sat until 19:00	Oss towards Arnhem Centraal
Rosmalen towards Dordrecht	NS Sprinter 6600 After 19:00 and Sun	Oss towards Nijmegen
Location
- Location within Netherlands

Oss West is a railway station located in Oss, Netherlands.

== History ==
The station was opened in 1981, 100 years after Oss railway station opened, and is located on the Tilburg–Nijmegen railway. The train services are operated by Nederlandse Spoorwegen.

On 20 September 2018 the Oss rail accident occurred at the adjacent level crossing, resulting in four deaths.

== Train services ==
The following services currently call at Oss West:

- 2x per hour local services (stoptrein) Nijmegen - Oss - 's-Hertogenbosch
