= Helmond railway station =

Railway station in the Netherlands

Helmond
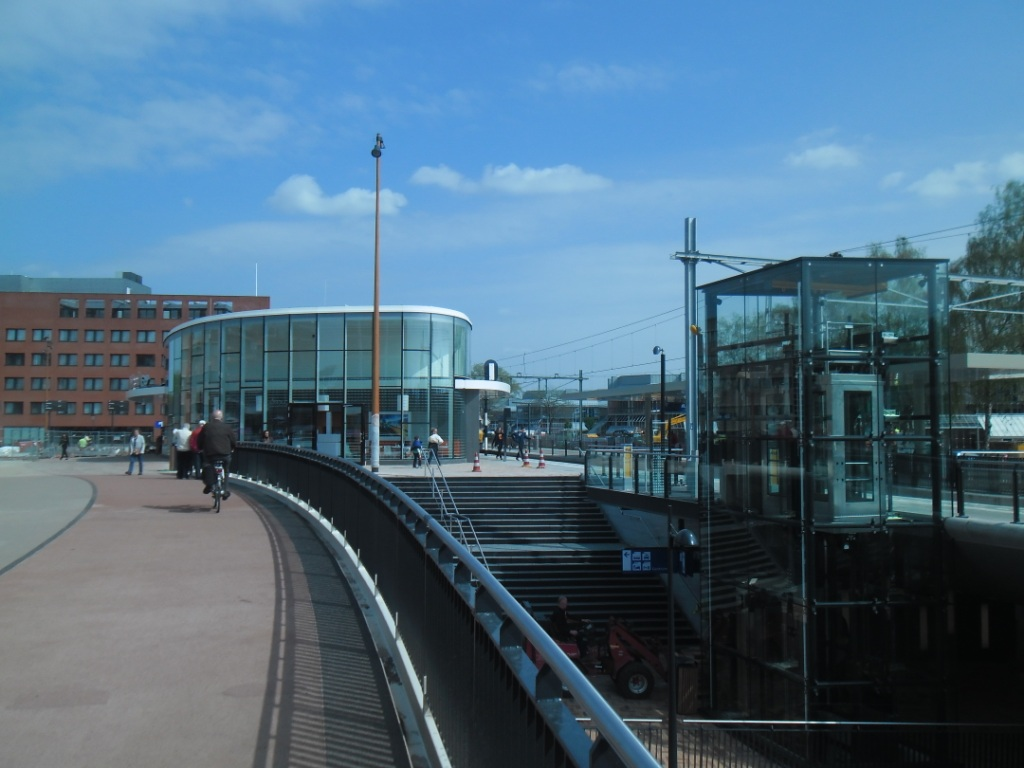

General information
- Location: Netherlands
- Coordinates: 51°28′32″N 5°39′42″E
- Line: Venlo–Eindhoven railway

History
- Opened: 1 July 1864; 162 years ago, February 2014; 12 years ago (current form)

Services
Preceding station	Nederlandse Spoorwegen	Following station
Eindhoven Centraal towards Dordrecht	NS Intercity 3500	Deurne towards Venlo
Helmond 't Hout towards 's-Hertogenbosch	NS Sprinter 4400 Except AM Peak	Helmond Brouwhuis towards Deurne
Helmond 't Hout towards Oss	NS Sprinter 4400 AM Peak	Helmond Brouwhuis towards Deurne
Location
- Location within Netherlands

Helmond is the main railway station in Helmond, Netherlands. The station opened on 1 July 1866 and is on the Venlo–Eindhoven railway. The station has 2 platforms. Train services are operated by Nederlandse Spoorwegen.

The station building from 1987 was demolished in 2013. A new station building including lifts, a new pedestrian and cycle bridge and new cycle parking facilities has been built, partly opened in February 2014. A new bus station and tunnel opened later in 2014.

== Train services ==
The following services calls at Helmond:

- 2x per hour intercity services Dordrecht - Den Haag HS - Schiphol Airport - Amsterdam South - Utrecht Central - Eindhoven Central - Helmond - Venlo
- Evening/Night (2x per hour Intercity service) Eindhoven - Helmond - Deurne - Horst-Sevenum - Blerick - Venlo
- 2x per hour local services (stoptrein) 's-Hertogenbosch - Boxtel - Eindhoven Central - Helmond Brandevoort - Helmond 't Hout - Helmond - Helmond Brouwhuis - Deurne

During Morning rush continues to Oss

== Bus services ==
Bus Service	From	To	Via
23	Helmond Central Station	Boxmeer Station	Milheeze
24	Helmond Central Station	Eindhoven Central Station	Mierlo
25	Helmond Central Station	Gemert	Beek en Donk
26	Helmond Central Station	Gemert	Helmond-Noord (Nieuwveld)
51	Helmond: Central Station	Helmond Eeuwsels	City Centre
52	Helmond: Central Station	Helmond Brouwhuis Station	Helmond Rijpelberg
53	Helmond: Central Station	Helmond Straakven	
54	Helmond: Central Station	Helmond Brouwhuis Station	Helmond Bokhorst
55	Helmond: Central Station	Helmond Stiphout	Elkerliek Hospital
150	Helmond: Central Station	Helmond 't Hout station	Automotive Campus
320	Helmond: Central Station	Eindhoven: Central Station	Someren
