= Helmond Brouwhuis railway station =

Railway station in the Netherlands

Helmond Brouwhuis
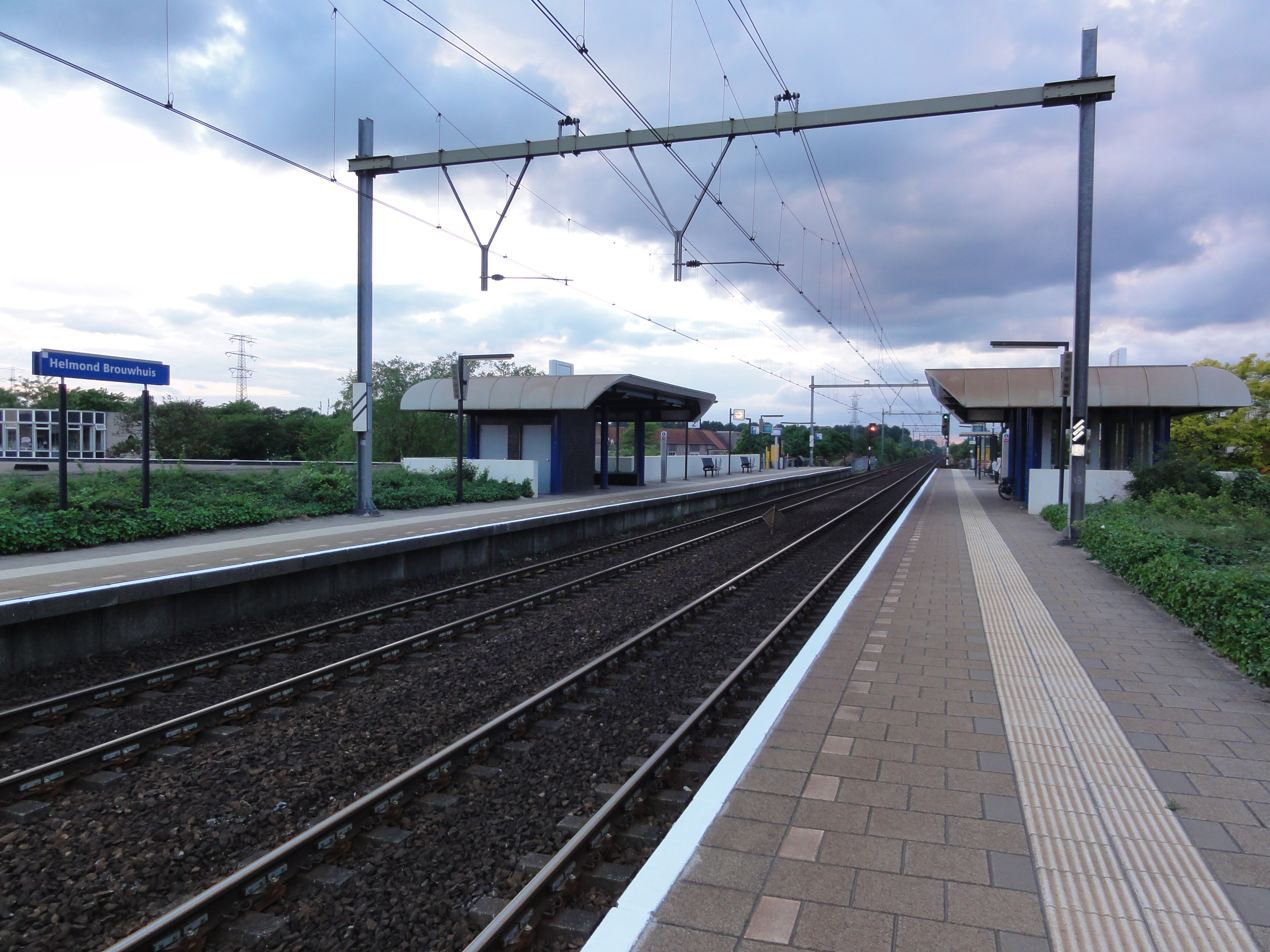

General information
- Location: Netherlands
- Coordinates: 51°28′13″N 5°42′10″E
- Line: Venlo–Eindhoven railway

History
- Opened: 1987

Services
Preceding station	Nederlandse Spoorwegen	Following station
Helmond towards 's-Hertogenbosch	NS Sprinter 4400 Except AM Peak	Deurne Terminus
Helmond towards Oss	NS Sprinter 4400 AM Peak	Deurne Terminus
Location
- Location within Netherlands

Helmond Brouwhuis is a railway station in Brouwhuis, a housing area of Helmond, Netherlands. The station opened in 1987 and is on the Venlo–Eindhoven railway. The station has 2 platforms. Train services are operated by Nederlandse Spoorwegen.

== Train service ==
The following services calls at Helmond Brouwhuis:

- 2x per hour local services (stoptrein) 's-Hertogenbosch - Eindhoven - Deurne
