= Venlo–Eindhoven railway =

Railway line in the Netherlands

Overview
- Status: Operational
- Locale: The Netherlands
- Termini: Venlo railway station; Eindhoven railway station

Service
- Operator: Nederlandse Spoorwegen

History
- Opened: 1866

Technical
- Line length: 52 km (32 mi)
- Number of tracks: double track
- Track gauge: 1,435 mm (4 ft 8 1/2 in) standard gauge
- Electrification: 1.5 kV DC

The Venlo–Eindhoven railway is an important railway line in the Netherlands running from Venlo to Eindhoven, passing through Helmond and Deurne. The line was opened in 1866. It is part of the Staatslijn "E".

== Interchange Stations ==
The main interchange stations on the Venlo–Eindhoven railway are:

- Venlo: to Roermond, Nijmegen and Düsseldorf
- Eindhoven: to 's-Hertogenbosch, Utrecht, Tilburg and Maastricht
- Blerick railway station: to Roermond and Nijmegen

== Stations ==
- Eindhoven Central Station
- Helmond Brandevoort
- Helmond 't Hout
- Helmond
- Helmond Brouwhuis
- Deurne
- Horst-Sevenum
- Blerick
- Venlo
