= Rosmalen railway station =

Railway station in the Netherlands

Rosmalen
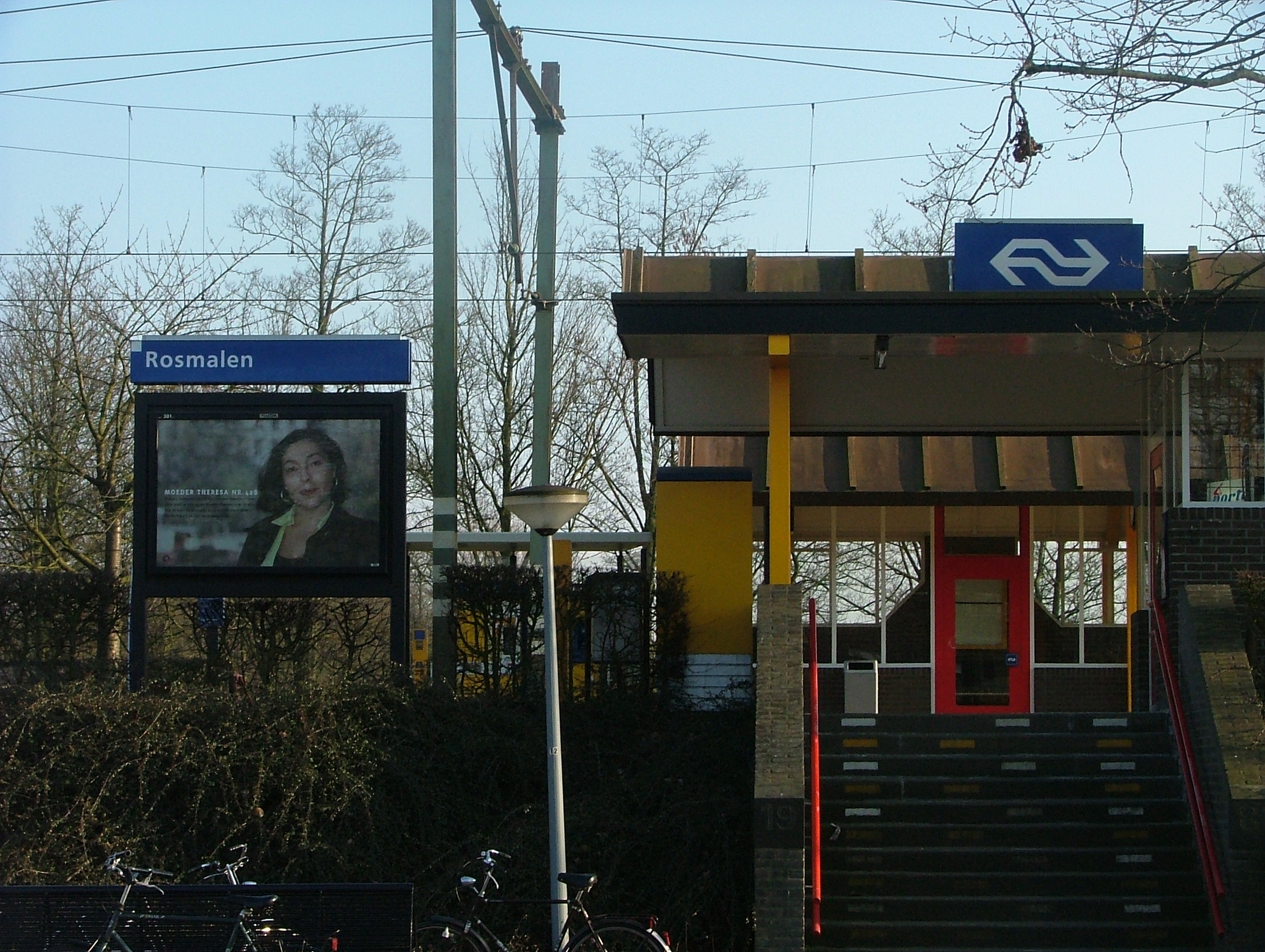

General information
- Location: Netherlands
- Coordinates: 51°42′54″N 5°22′08″E
- Line: Tilburg–Nijmegen railway

History
- Opened: 1981

Services
Preceding station	Nederlandse Spoorwegen	Following station
's-Hertogenbosch Oost towards Deurne	NS Sprinter 4400 AM Peak	Oss West towards Oss
's-Hertogenbosch Oost towards Dordrecht	NS Sprinter 6600 Mon-Sat until 19:00	Oss West towards Arnhem Centraal
's-Hertogenbosch Oost towards Dordrecht	NS Sprinter 6600 After 19:00 and Sun	Oss West towards Nijmegen
Location
- Location within Netherlands

Rosmalen is a railway station located in the town of Rosmalen. It is one of three railway stations in the municipality of 's-Hertogenbosch, Netherlands. The railway station was opened at the Tilburg–Nijmegen railway in 1881. It was closed again in 1938. In 1981 the railway station was reopened again, but this time on another location.

== Train services ==
The following services currently call at Rosmalen:

- 2x per hour local services (stoptrein) Nijmegen - Oss - 's-Hertogenbosch
