= Rosmalen train accident =

1920 rail accident in the Netherlands

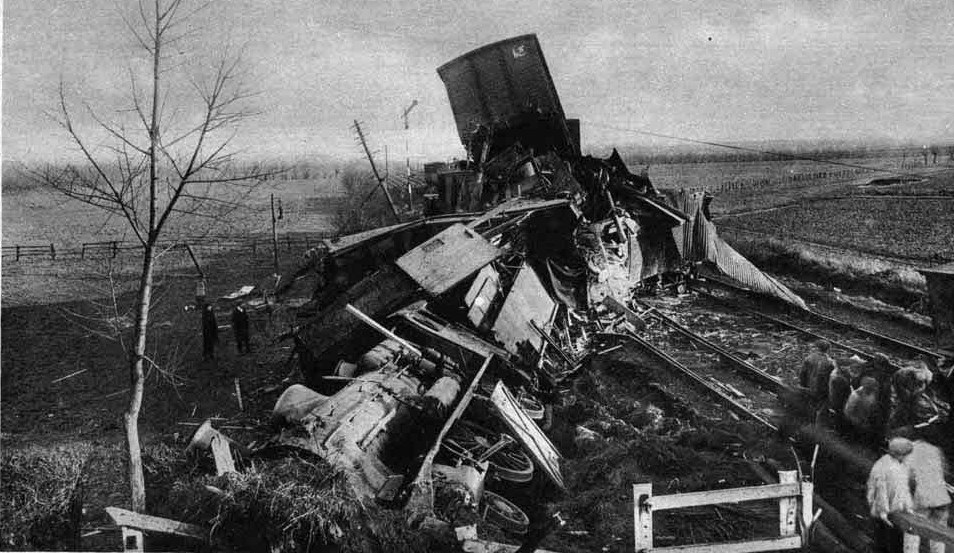

Details
- Date: 27 December 1920
- Location: Rosmalen
- Coordinates: 51°43′9″N 5°22′2″E
- Country: Netherlands
- Incident type: Derailment
- Cause: Ignoring signal

Statistics
- Trains: 2
- Deaths: 3

The Rosmalen train accident was a railway accident next to the street Burgemeester Wolterstraat near Rosmalen railway station in Rosmalen, Netherlands in late December 1920. In the accident two freight trains collided and three people died.

One of the two freight trains was on a side track in front of the Rosmalen railway station. The train was driving back upon the main track and collided with a freight train coming from the direction of Nijmegen. Due to the collision, the locomotive of the colliding train derailed and the following eight wagons slid in and up each other.

According to witnesses the train driver had ignored an unsafe sign. Three people died: the main conductor and two brakemen. One of them lay for 11 hours seriously injured under the rubble before he could be released. He died shortly afterwards in hospital.

== Gallery ==
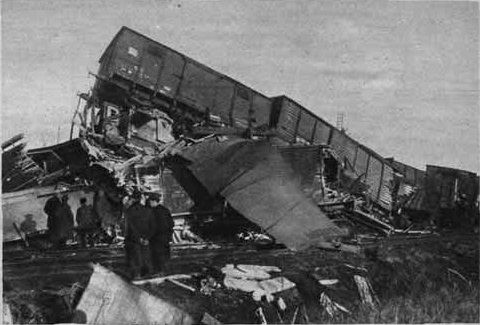

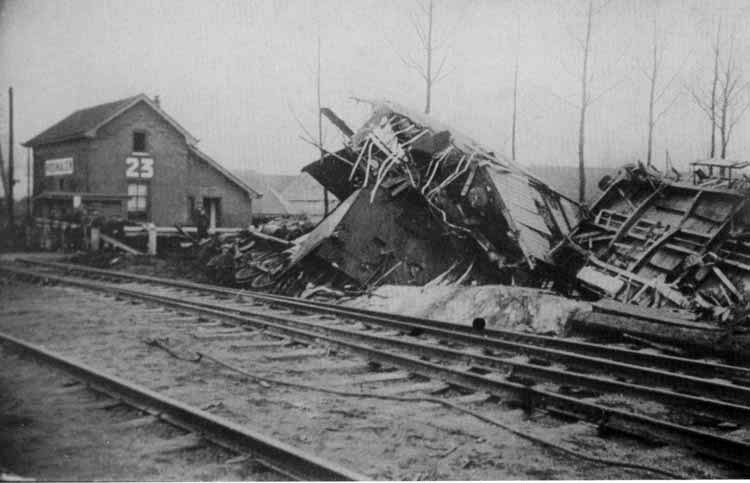
