= Blerick railway station =

Railway station in the Netherlands

Blerick
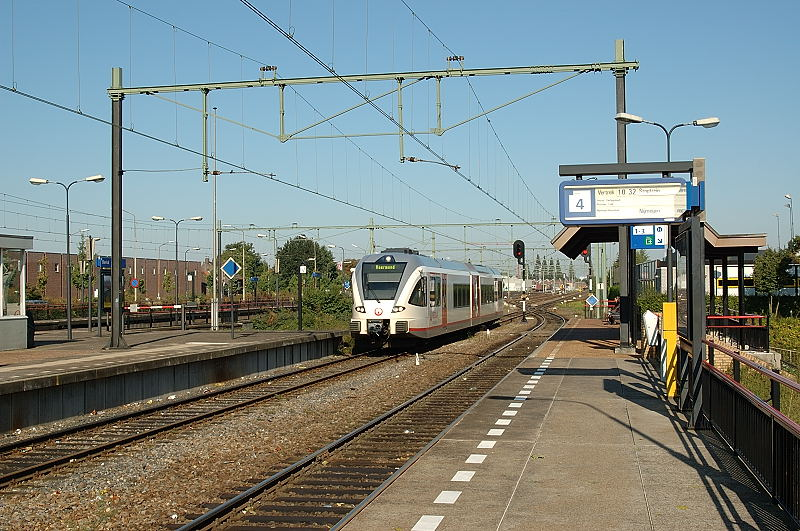

General information
- Location: Netherlands
- Coordinates: 51°22′21″N 6°09′18″E
- Lines: Venlo–Eindhoven railway Nijmegen–Venlo railway

History
- Opened: 1868; 158 years ago

Services
| Preceding station | Nederlandse Spoorwegen | Following station |
|---|---|---|
| Horst-Sevenum towards Dordrecht | NS Intercity 3500 | Venlo Terminus |
| Preceding station | Arriva Netherlands | Following station |
| Venray towards Nijmegen | Stoptrein 32200 | Venlo towards Roermond |
Location
- Location within Netherlands

Blerick is a railway station located in Blerick, Netherlands. The station was opened in 1868 and is located on the Venlo–Eindhoven railway and the Nijmegen–Venlo railway. The station is operated by Nederlandse Spoorwegen and Arriva. The station has four platforms.

== Train services ==
The following train services call at this station:

- Express Intercity service: (Schiphol–Utrecht–'s-Hertogenbosch–)Eindhoven–Helmond–Venlo
- Local Stoptrein service: Nijmegen–Venlo–Roermond

== Bus services ==
- Buses departing from the station proper:
  - Bus 70: Venlo Station–Blerick–Venlo Freshpark–Sevenum–Horst
  - Bus 88: Venray Station–Oostrum–Wanssum–Meerlo–Tienray–Swolgen–Broekhuizenvorst–Broekhuizen–Lottum–Grubbenvorst–Blerick–Venlo
- Buses departing from Burgemeester Gommansstraat:
  - City bus 1: Blerick–Venlo Station–Venlo Hospital–Tegelen–Kaldenkirchen
  - City bus 2: Blerick–Venlo Station–Venlo City Centre–Venlo Stalberg
  - Bus 80: Venlo Station–Blerick–Sevenum–Horst–Venray–Ysselsteyn–Deurne
  - Schoolline 670: Venlo Station–Blerick–Maasbree–Helden–Panningen
