= Helmond Castle =

Medieval castle in Helmond, the Netherlands

- Kasteel van Helmond
- Kasteelplein 1, 5701 PP Helmond, the Netherlands
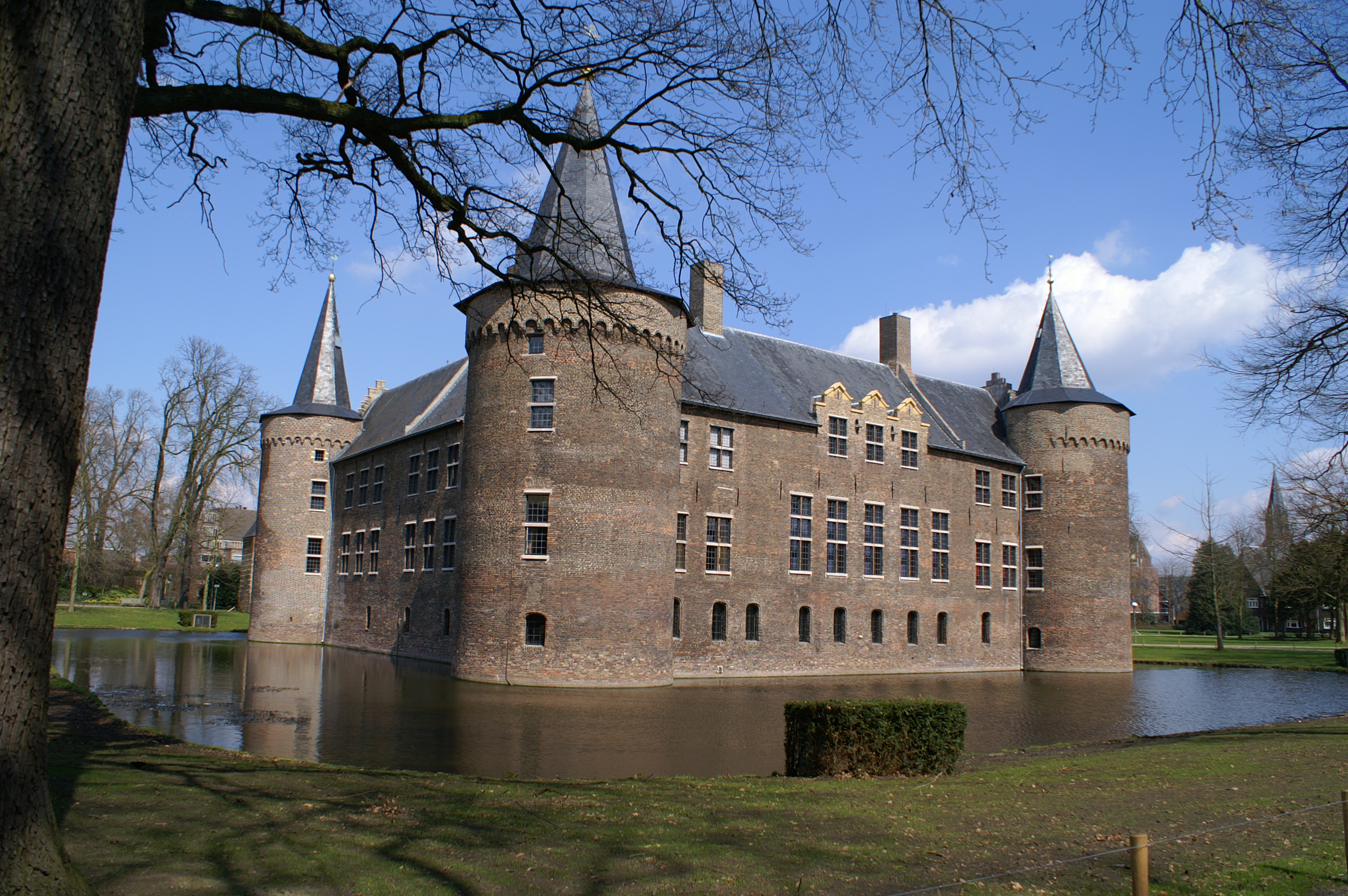
- Helmond Castle

Site information
- Type: Castle
- Owner: Museum Helmond
- Open to the public: yes

Location
- The Netherlands
- Coordinates: 51.477321°N 5.653037°E

Site history
- Built: 1325

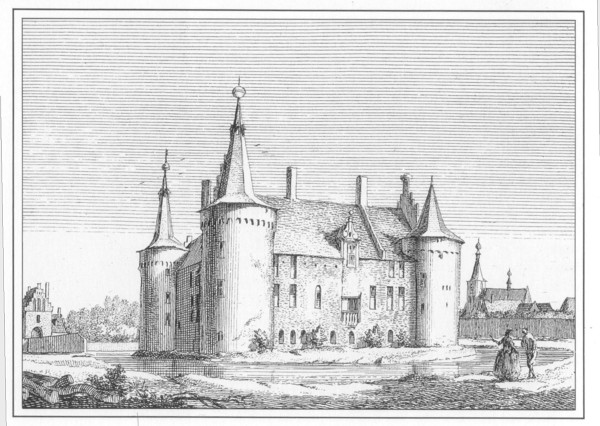
17th century print of Helmond Castle

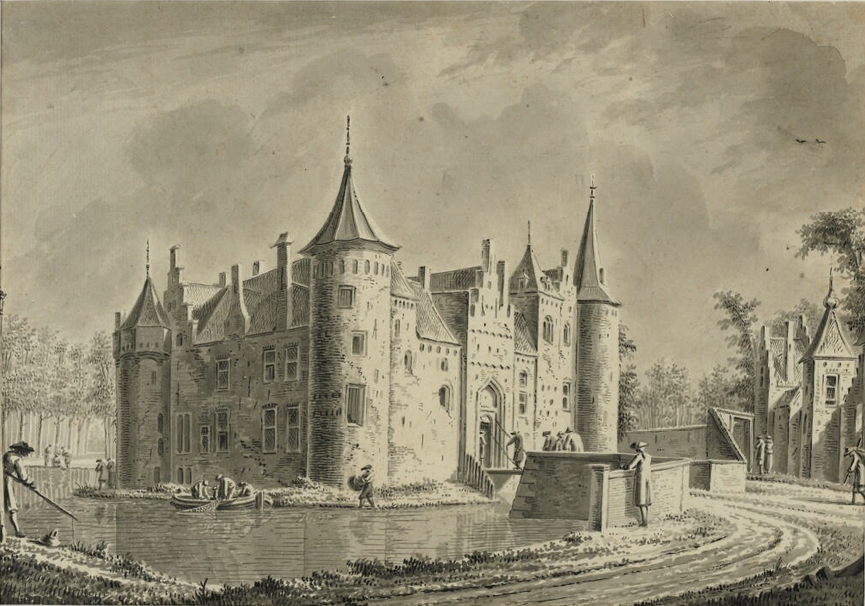
View of Helmond Castle, by Dirk Verrijk (2nd half of the 18th century)

Helmond Castle is a square medieval moated castle in the center of the city Helmond in the Dutch province of North Brabant.

== History ==
Construction of the current castle started around 1325. This served to replace an older castle (known as 't Oude Huys ), which stood a few hundred meters west of the present castle, and whose excavations in 1981 have revealed the foundations of a stone keep and objects.

In the twelfth century, the area around Helmond was part of the possessions of the van Hornes. The current castle was initially owned by the van Berlaer family who were vassals to the Duke of Brabant. In 1433 this family was succeeded by the van Cortenbach family. In 1683 the castle passed into the hands of the Arberg family by marriage. The mint master Carel Frederik Wesselman bought the manor with the castle Helmond in 1781.

In 1549 a fierce fire raged in the castle, in which especially the west wing and the roofs of the building were damaged. Complete destruction has certainly not taken place. Evidence of this was found in later renovations in the 20th century .

In 1921, the ownership of the castle was transferred to the municipality of Helmond by the widow of the last lord of the castle Carel Frederik Wesselman van Helmond, jkvr. Anna Maria de Jonge van Zwijnsbergen and her two daughters, on the condition that the castle was only used for the municipal administration. or intended for other public use. After a thorough renovation, the castle was taken into use as a town hall from 1923 onwards. The space became too small in the 1970s. A new town hall was put into use. Of the municipal functions, 2 wedding halls and the council chamber remained in use. In 2001 the council chamber moved to a new location in nearby Boscotondo . Museum Helmond has been in the castle since 1982established. The castle is also used as a wedding location.

== Characteristics of the castle ==
The current castle was designed as a square water castle with a round tower at each corner and no central residential tower or keep, very similar in ground plan to similar castles such as Muiden Castle, Radboud Castle, or Ammersoyen Castle. These square castles turned out to have better defensive qualities than older round castles. The ground plan of the castle measures approximately 35 X 35 meters. The diameter of the corner towers is approximately 8 meters. The entrance is on the north side through a gatehouse that is almost integrated with the adjacent buildings.

The castle used to have a double ring of moats, only the moat around the building itself remains. The castle also included some outbuildings and entrance gates. Apart from two square towers and one entrance gate, these have to make way for the construction of the Kasteel-Traverse (a bridge crossing straight through the center of Helmond). Over the centuries, the building was adapted several times to the then current use. During the major renovation in 1923, a system of corridors was built in front of the original rooms. The cellar vaults have remained virtually authentic. Almost nothing remains of the original interior. A few authentic fireplaces can still be seen on the so - called Bel-floor.

== Castles in Helmond ==
In principle there have been two castles in Helmond. 't Oude Huys is the first, followed by the current moated castle. Recently, historical research in the archives of Helmond has revealed that next to 't Oude Huys there was a second castle in Helmond, probably built before the 12th century. The possible builder of this first castle may have been Hezelo van Helmond.
