= Horst-Sevenum railway station =

Railway station in the Netherlands

Horst-Sevenum
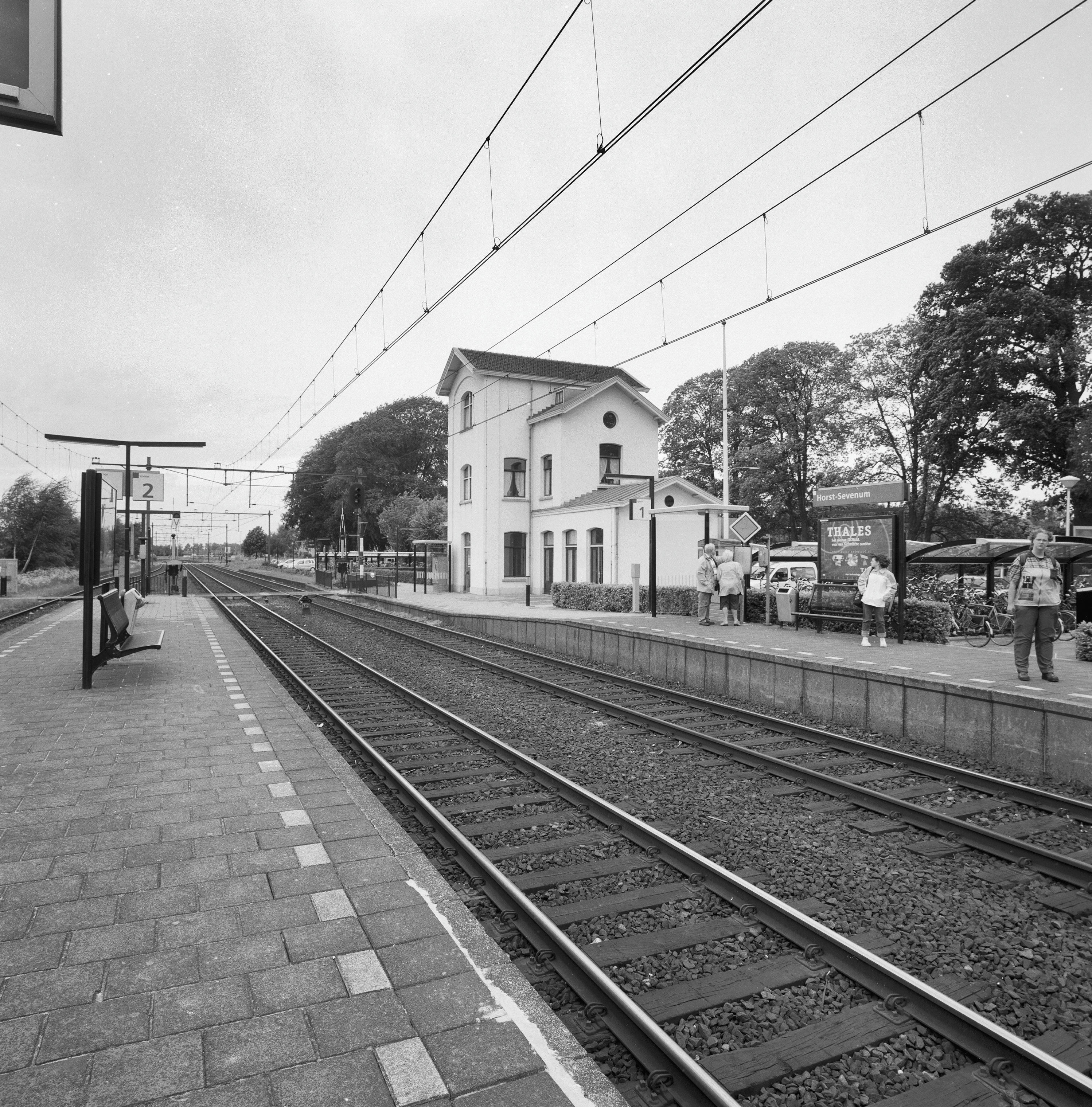

General information
- Location: Netherlands
- Coordinates: 51°25′36″N 6°02′31″E
- Line: Venlo–Eindhoven railway

History
- Opened: 1866; 160 years ago

Services
Preceding station	Nederlandse Spoorwegen	Following station
Deurne towards Dordrecht	NS Intercity 3500	Blerick towards Venlo
Location
- Location within Netherlands

Horst-Sevenum is a railway station for Horst and Sevenum, The Netherlands. The station was opened on 1 October 1866 and is located on the Venlo–Eindhoven railway. The services are operated by Nederlandse Spoorwegen.

== Train service ==
The following services call at Horst-Sevenum:

- 2x per hour intercity services The Hague - Rotterdam - Breda - Eindhoven - Venlo

== Bus services ==
Bus Service 60 stops at the station. This service serves both Horst and Sevenum.

Taxi Bus services 64 and 65 also stop at this station. 64 to Griendtsveen via America. 65 to Panningen via Evertsoord.

Service 69 also serves the station. Operating between Tienray and Horst-Sevenum station. This service operates via Horst.
