= Blerick =

Place in Limburg, Netherlands

- Flag Coat of arms

- Location in the Netherlands
- Coordinates: 51°22′N 6°9′E
- Country: Netherlands
- Province: Limburg
- Municipality: Venlo

Area
  - Total: 34.99 km^{2} (13.51 sq mi)
  - Land: 34.24 km^{2} (13.22 sq mi)
  - Water: 0.74 km^{2} (0.29 sq mi)

Population (2006)
  - Total: 27,330
- Postal code: 5921-5928
- Area code: 077
- Major roads: A67, A73

Blerick (Dutch pronunciation: [ˈbleːrɪk]; Limburgish: Bliërik [ˈbliəʀɪk]; 51°22′N 6°9′E) is a city district of the Dutch municipality of Venlo. It lies on the west bank of the Meuse and its origin goes back to the Roman era as a military stronghold and settlement en route from Mosa Trajectum (Maastricht) to Noviomagus (Nijmegen). Blerick can be found on the Peutinger Table as Blariacum. Up to the second world war Blerick formed together with Baarlo and Maasbree one municipality. Under German rule Blerick became part of the municipality of Venlo.

In 2001, Blerick had 25875 inhabitants. The built-up area of the city district was 7.27 km^{2}, and contained 10866 residences.

== Transportation ==
- Blerick railway station
