= Helmond =

City in North Brabant, Netherlands

Helmond Hèllemond (Helmonds)
- City and municipality
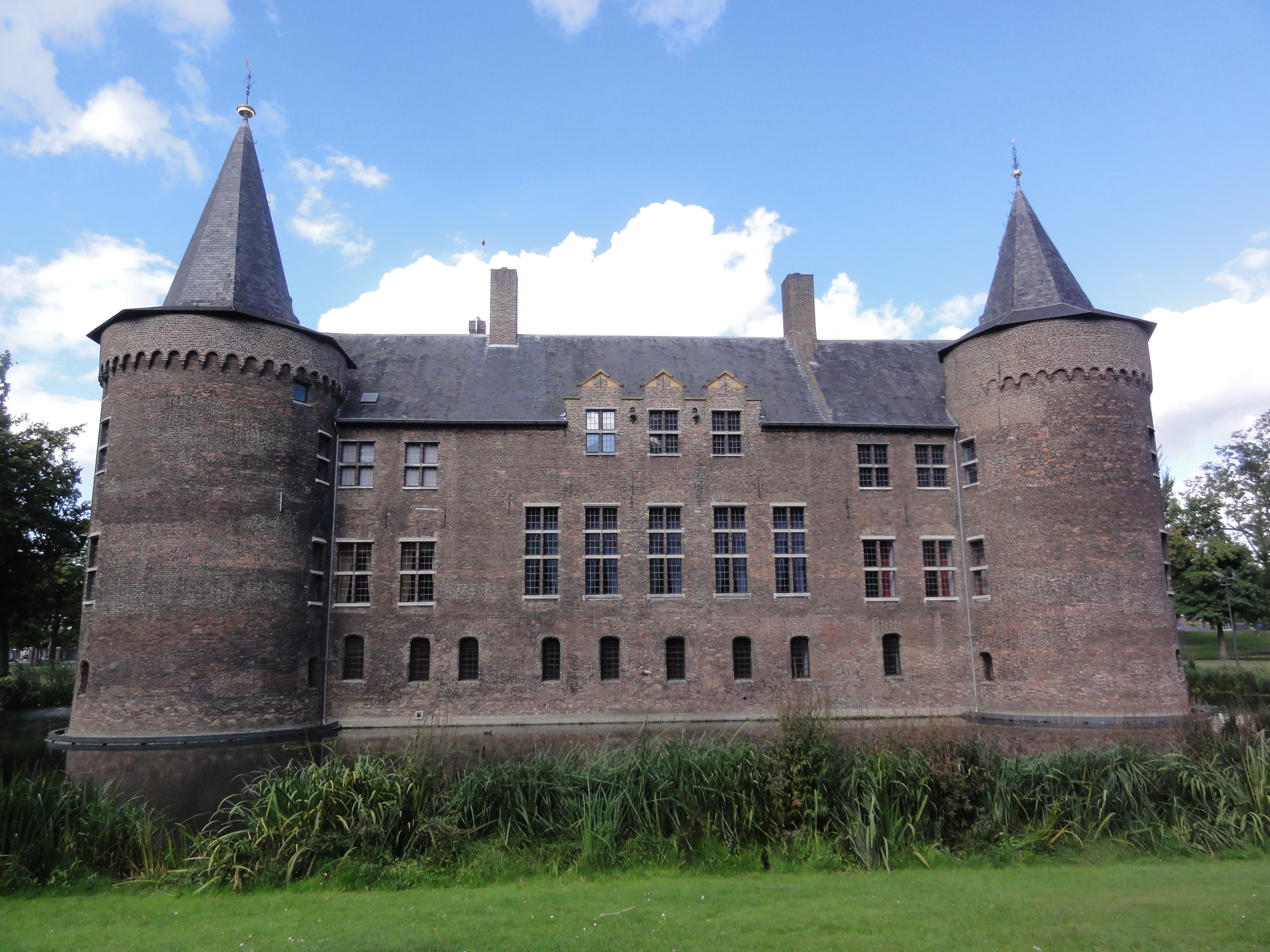
- Helmond Castle

- Flag Coat of arms

- Location in North Brabant
- Coordinates: 51°29′N 5°39′E
- Country: Netherlands
- Province: North Brabant

Government
  - Body: Municipal council
  - Mayor: Sjoerd Potters (VVD)

Area
  - Total: 54.75 km^{2} (21.14 sq mi)
  - Land: 53.18 km^{2} (20.53 sq mi)
  - Water: 1.57 km^{2} (0.61 sq mi)
- Elevation: 18 m (59 ft)

Population (January 2021)
  - Total: 92,627
  - Density: 1,742/km^{2} (4,510/sq mi)
- Demonyms: Helmondenaar, Helmonder, Helmonter
- Time zone: UTC+1 (CET)
  - Summer (DST): UTC+2 (CEST)
- Postcode: 5700–5709
- Area code: 0492
- Website: www.helmond.nl

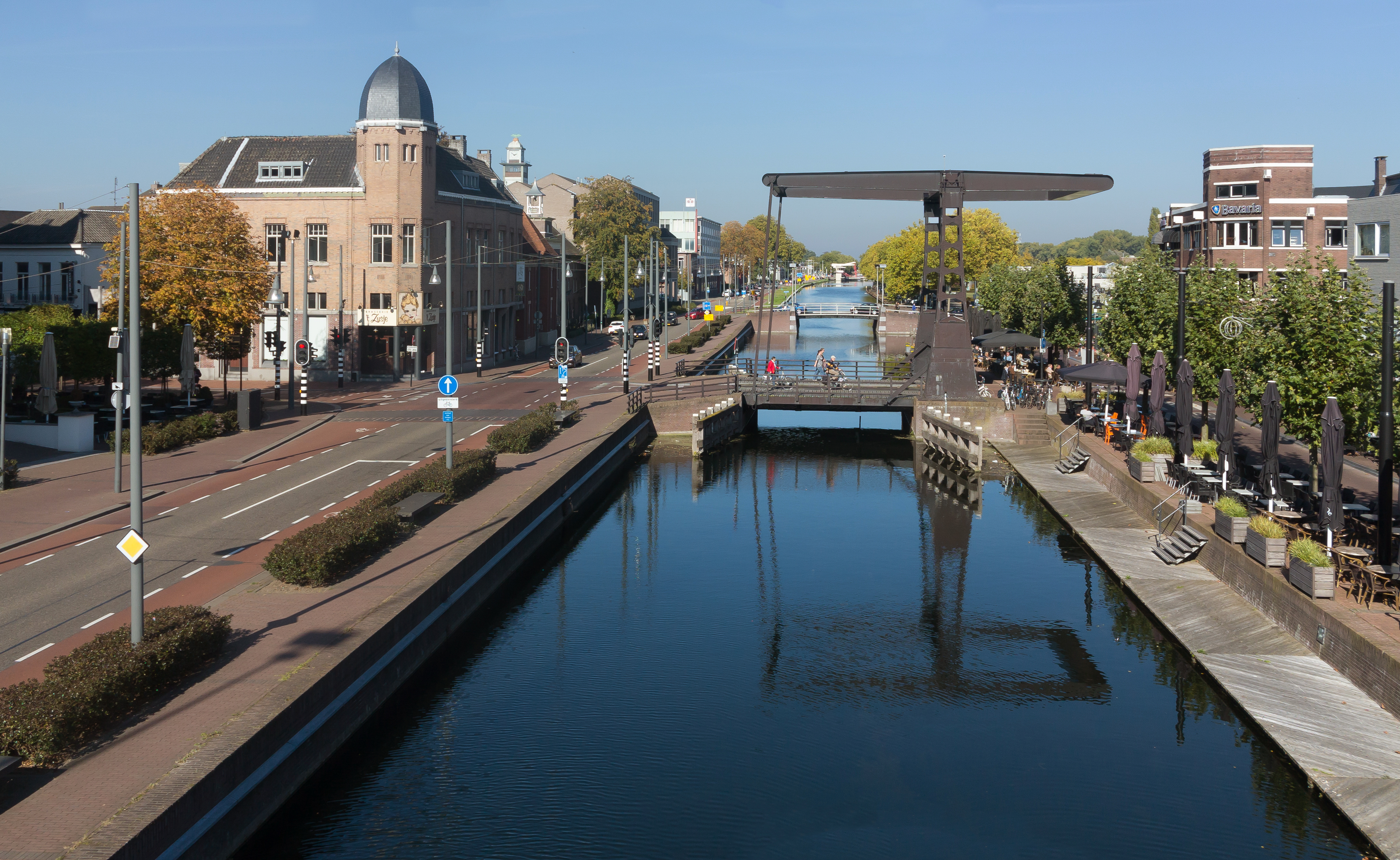
View to the canal through the city

Helmond (Dutch pronunciation: [ˈɦɛlmɔnt]; called Hèllemond in the local dialect) is a city and municipality in the Metropoolregio Eindhoven of the province of North Brabant in the Southern Netherlands.

Helmond is home to several textile and metal companies. The Vlisco factory is located next to the Zuid-Willemsvaart canal, which runs through the city.

The spoken language is Helmonds (an East Brabantian dialect).

== History ==
=== Etymology and coat of arms ===
Helmond's coat of arms, first appearing in 1241, displays a helmet, and is a canting arms for the city's name, as "helm" means "helmet" in Dutch. However, the actual etymology of Helmond's name is probably derived from the combination of Hel, which means "low-lying" (from Proto-Germanic *haljæ / Hel), and Mond, which referred to higher ground or a secure place.

The helmet on the coat of arms originally was depicted as a medieval great helm, however, the design eventually came to depict a jousting helmet. The oak sprigs symbolize freedom, while the bird perched on them is thought to be purely decorative.

=== Medieval and early modern periods ===
During the Merovingian period, the site of what is now Helmond was an only partially habitable convergence of streams. As the streams began to silt over, settlement was made possible, and by the year 1000, a settlement arose west of what is the current city center. Additionally, a precursor to the current Helmond Castle, named 't Oude Huys ("the old house"), was built around this time. Documents from 1108 mention Lord Hazelo von Helmond, the first feudal lord of the allodium of Helmond.

In 1179, a bull of Pope Alexander III mentions Helmond being donated to the Abbey of Floreffe. At this point, the local feudal administration was probably moved to 't Oude Huys. In 1220, Helmond came under the control of Henry I of Brabant. In 1225, the town was founded by Henry, it received its Town Privileges in 1232. Following his death in 1235, it was passed down to his daughter, Maria of Brabant, Holy Roman Empress, who spent much time at 't Oude Huys and whose founding of Binderen Abbey benefited the growth of the city. Upon her death in 1260, the town passed back to the Dukes of Brabant, who, in 1315, leased it to the van Berlaer family. In 1325, Jan II Berthout van Berlaer started the construction of a stone keep on the site of the current Helmond Castle, supplanting 't Oude Huys. By 1400, the city ramparts were built.

Having gained market rights in 1376, Helmond's textile industry began to develop, and in 1389, seven guilds were authorized to operate in the town. Merchants from Helmond sold wool and textiles throughout Brabant. Despite the commercial growth, the town's population remained small. Helmond's prosperity soon ended due to war and instability in the Duchy of Guelders, and following Charles V's ascension to the Duchy of Brabant, Helmond was put under siege and sacked by the army of Maarten van Rossum in 1543.

=== Under the Dutch Republic and the Revolutionary era ===
Helmond was also embroiled in the Eighty Years War. Since it remained loyal to Philip II of Spain, the army of the Dutch Republic twice captured and lost the city, with only the castle remaining uncaptured. The effects of the war and a plague outbreak in 1636 decimated the textile industry in Helmond, and many weavers fled to Haarlem. Only with the peace of 1648 could the city start to recover. The weavers of Helmond gained a fruitful partnership with merchants in Haarlem, and the city could rebuild from the war. Catholics were pushed underground. Although the city recovered its prosperity, it was once again plunged into instability during the Patriottentijd of the late 18th century. Following several skirmishes and political maneuvers in the city, the Patriots were crushed through the intervention of Prussia in 1787, but only five years later in 1793, the French Republic invaded. The liberal French administration allowed the Patriots to re-assert themselves in the city, and in 1795, universal male suffrage came to Helmond. By 1798, the vestiges of the Dutch Republic were abolished, and Catholics were once again allowed to take part in city governance.

=== 19th and 20th centuries ===
By the late 18th and early 19th century, local entrepreneurs also started to grow the textile business unassisted by the Haarlem merchants, facilitating industrial production. It became a city with a seat in the Estates of Brabant in 1814. The 1826 opening of the Zuid-Willemsvaart canal, which runs through the city, brought more prosperity to the city. In addition to the weaving mills and the associated yarn dyeing and bleaching plants, other branches of the textile industry also developed, such as cotton printing.

The introduction of steam power and construction of a railway station in 1866 greatly accelerated the development of Helmond, and its population greatly increased. By the early 20th century, industry in Helmond started to branch out from textiles: metal products, such as machines and wires, were produced in the city, along with a cocoa factory, a margarine factory, and the grocery chain EDAH.

In 1940, Helmond was captured by the Wehrmacht, and its city administration was taken over by NSB collaborators. The city was liberated by the British Army on 24 and 25 September 1944.

After the war, industry once again flourished, with new companies establishing themselves in the city while old industries continued. Pursuing a modern image, prominent projects such as the Cube Houses were built. Helmond gained its 80,000th resident in 1999, and continues to grow.

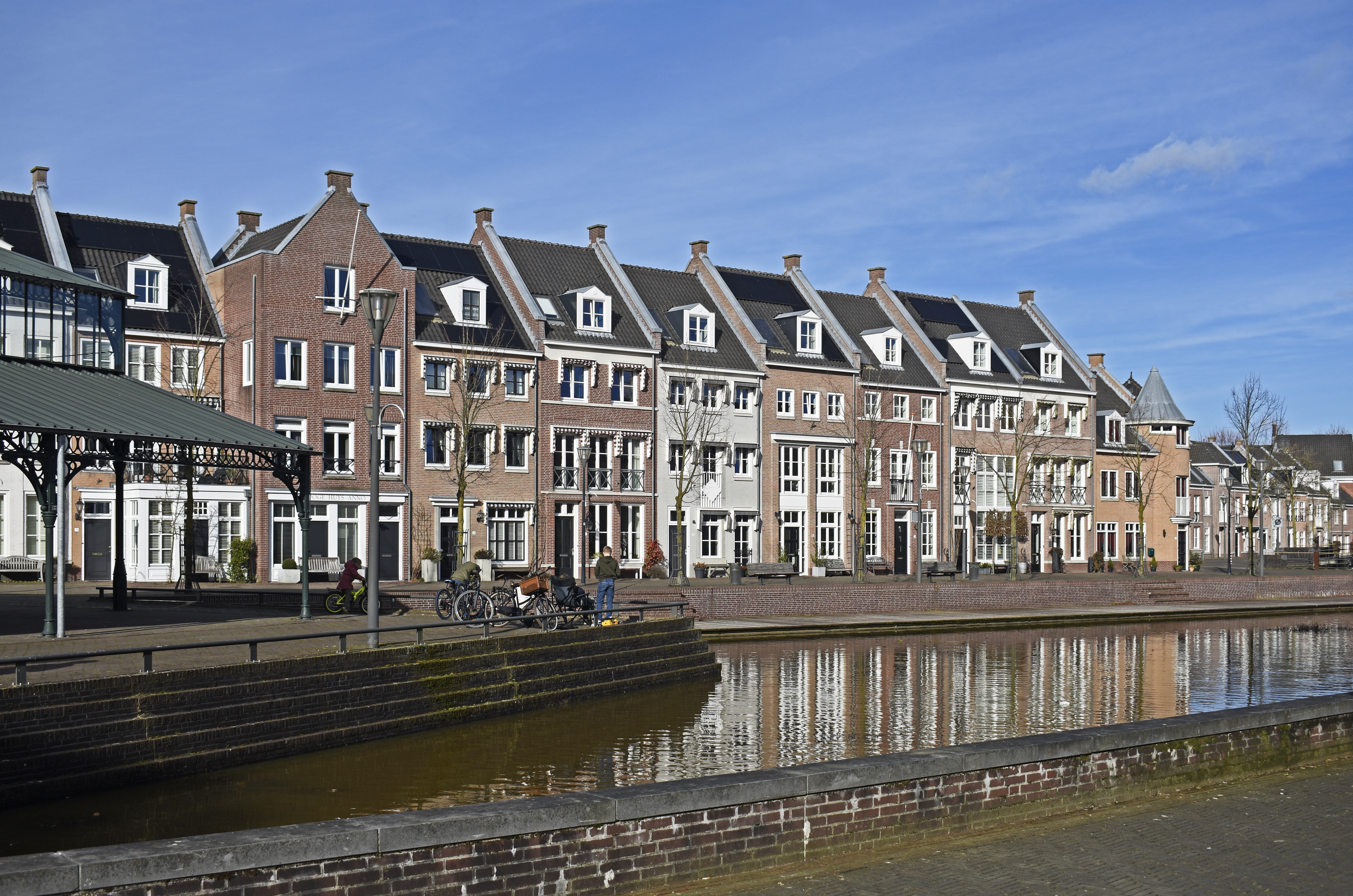
Brandevoort, a new urban quarter of Helmond

The new quarter Brandevoort (built 1993 to 2017) is notable for its cohesive New Urbanism principles and the architecture adapting to the traditional local style of Brabant.

== Geography ==
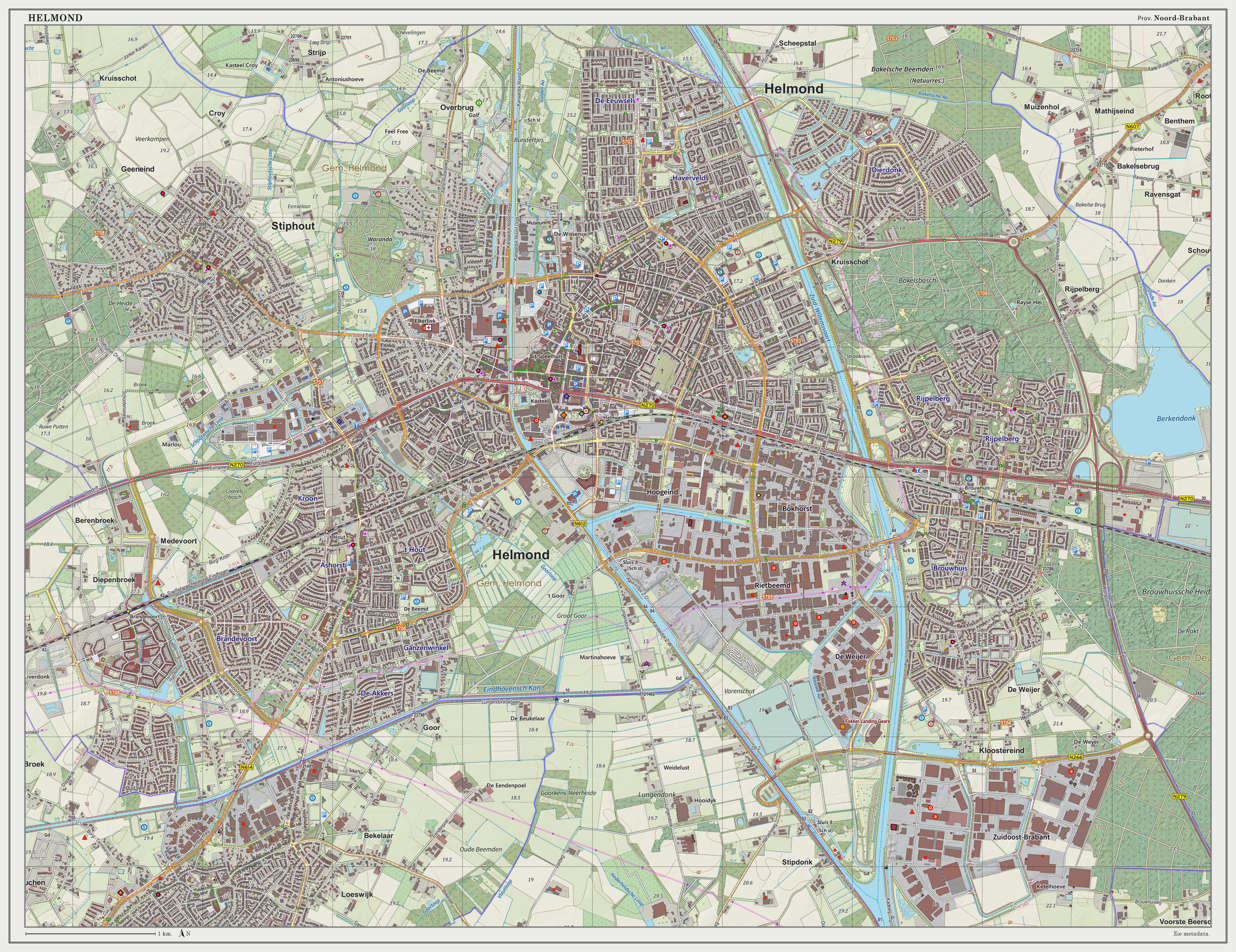
Map of Helmond (city), March 2014

Helmond is subdivided into quarters and neighbourhoods:

- Quarter 11 Inner City
  - Neighbourhood 0 Centrum
  - Neighbourhood 2 Leonardus
  - Neighbourhood 3 Heipoort
  - Neighbourhood 4 Stationsgebied
  - Neighbourhood 5 Vossenberg
  - Neighbourhood 6 Annabuurt en Suytkade
  - Neighbourhood 7 Steenweg en omgeving
- Quarter 11 Helmond-East
  - Neighbourhood 0 Beisterveld
  - Neighbourhood 1 Beisterveldse Broek
  - Neighbourhood 2 Straakven
- Quarter 12 Helmond-North
  - Neighbourhood 0 Bloemvelden
  - Neighbourhood 1 Binderen
  - Neighbourhood 2 Eeuwsels
- Quarter 13 Mierlo-Hout
  - Neighbourhood 0 't Hout-Centrum
  - Neighbourhood 1 Kroon
  - Neighbourhood 2 Akkers
  - Neighbourhood 3 Gansenwinkel
  - Neighbourhood 9 Groot Goor
- Quarter 14 Brouwhuis
  - Neighbourhood 0 Brouwhuis-Dorp
  - Neighbourhood 1 Brouwhuis-West
  - Neighbourhood 2 Brouwhuis-Oost
  - Neighbourhood 4 Brouwhorst
  - Neighbourhood 9 Kloostereind
- Quarter 15 Helmond-West
  - Neighbourhood 0 West
  - Neighbourhood 1 Houtsdonk
- Quarter 16 Warande
  - Neighbourhood 0 Oranjebuurt
  - Neighbourhood 1 Zwanenbeemd
  - Neighbourhood 9 Overbrug
- Quarter 17 Stiphout
  - Neighbourhood 0 Stiphout-Dorp
  - Neighbourhood 1 Schooten
  - Neighbourhood 9 Geeneind
- Quarter 18 Rijpelberg
  - Neighbourhood 1 Rijpelberg-Oost
  - Neighbourhood 2 Rijpelberg-West
  - Neighbourhood 9 Berkendonk
- Quarter 19 Dierdonk
  - Neighbourhood 0 Kern Dierdonk
  - Neighbourhood 9 Scheepstal
- Quarter 21 Brandevoort
  - Neighbourhood 1 De Veste
  - Neighbourhood 2 Schutsboom
  - Neighbourhood 3 Stepekolk
  - Neighbourhood 4 Berenbroek
- Quarter 29 Industrial park-South
  - Neighbourhood 1 Hoogeind
  - Neighbourhood 2 B.Z.O.B.

== Transport ==
Railway stations: Helmond, Helmond Brouwhuis, Helmond Brandevoort, Helmond 't Hout

== Local media ==
Newspapers:

- ED - Helmond Plus
- ZondagNieuws (translated: SundayNews)
- De Traverse
- De Loop

Radio:

- Omroep Helmond (Radio) (translated: Helmond Broadcasting (Radio))
- Internetradio Helmond Sport

Television:

- Omroep Helmond (TV) (translated: Helmond Broadcasting (TV))

News on the internet:

- Alles Over Helmond (part of Omroep Helmond) (translated: Everything About Helmond)
- De Weblog van Helmond (translated: Helmonds´ weblog)

== Politics ==
=== Municipal council ===
The municipal council consists of 37 seats. Below is the council since 2002:

Seats
Partij	2002	2006	2010	2014	2018	2022	2026
Helder Helmond	-	2	3	1	3	5	8
GroenLinks / PvdA ***	-	-	-	-	-	-	6
VVD	5	4	5	5	5	6	5
Forum voor Democratie	-	-	-	-	-	2	5
D66	1	1	-*	3	3	3	4
50Plus**	3	1	-	2	3	2	2
CDA	7	8	7	6	5	3	2
Lokaal sterk	-	-	-	6	3	2	2
Denk	-	-	-	-	-	1	1
SP	3	4	3	6	5	3	1
Mi Hellemonders	-	-	-	-	-	1	1
GroenLinks	1	1	2	2	6	7	***
PvdA	5	9	6	3	2	2	***
Helmond Aktief	1	1	1	2	1	-	-
Plan!	-	-	-	1	1	-	-
SDOH-D66-HB*	-	-	8	-	-	-	-
Trots op Nederland	-	-	2	-	-	-	-
SDH-OH	6	4	-*	-	-	-	-
Helmondse Belangen	5	2	-*	-	-	-	-
Total	37	37	37	37	37	37	37

* In 2010 the political parties SDH-OH, Helmondse Belangen, and D66 formed 1 group in the council, but took part in the elections separately. In the elections they received 4, 2 and 2 seats respectively.
** Until the election of 2018 the party 50Plus was known as senioren.
*** In 2026 GroenLinks and PvdA put forward a joint list.

== Notable residents ==
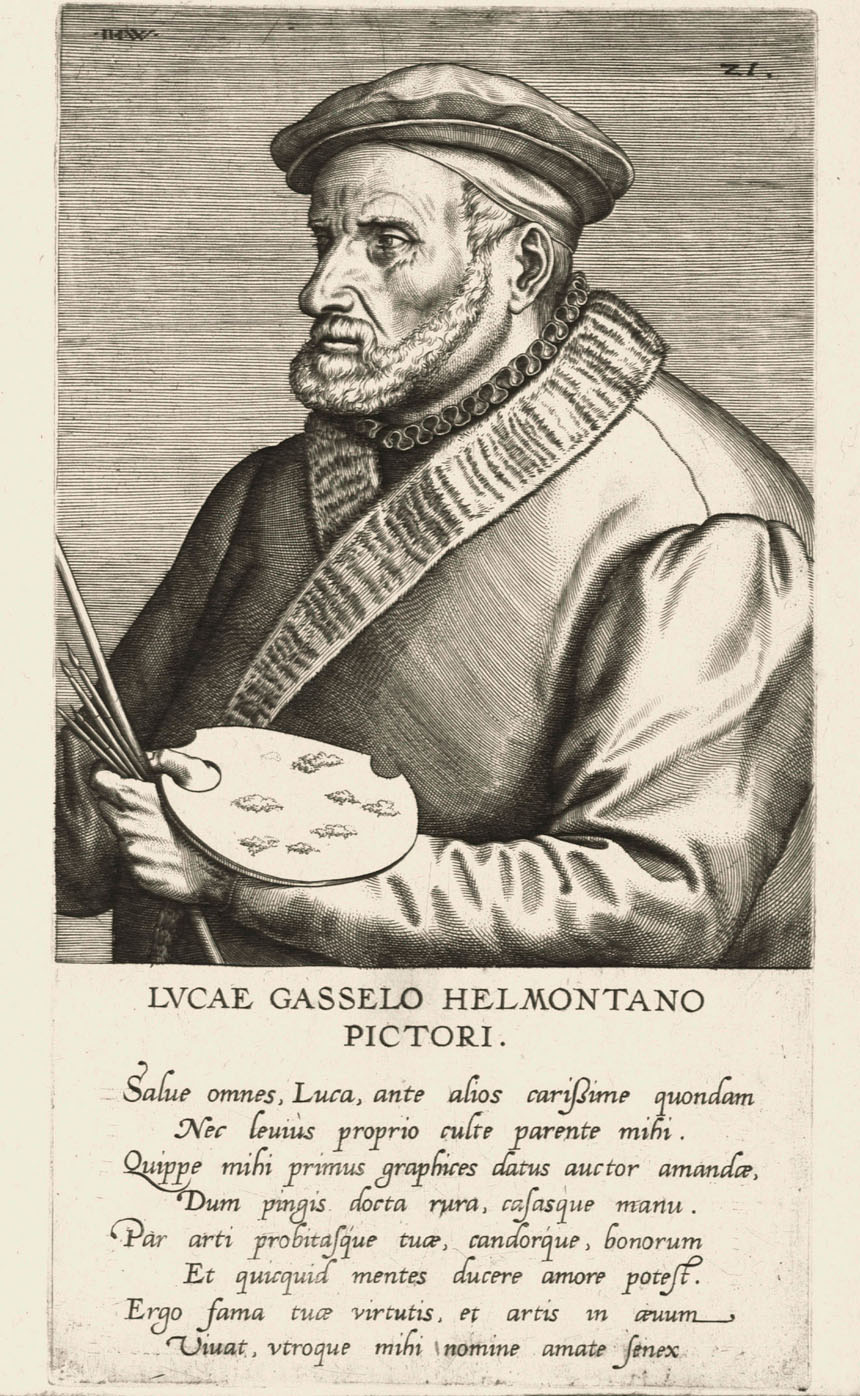
Lucas Gassel, 1572

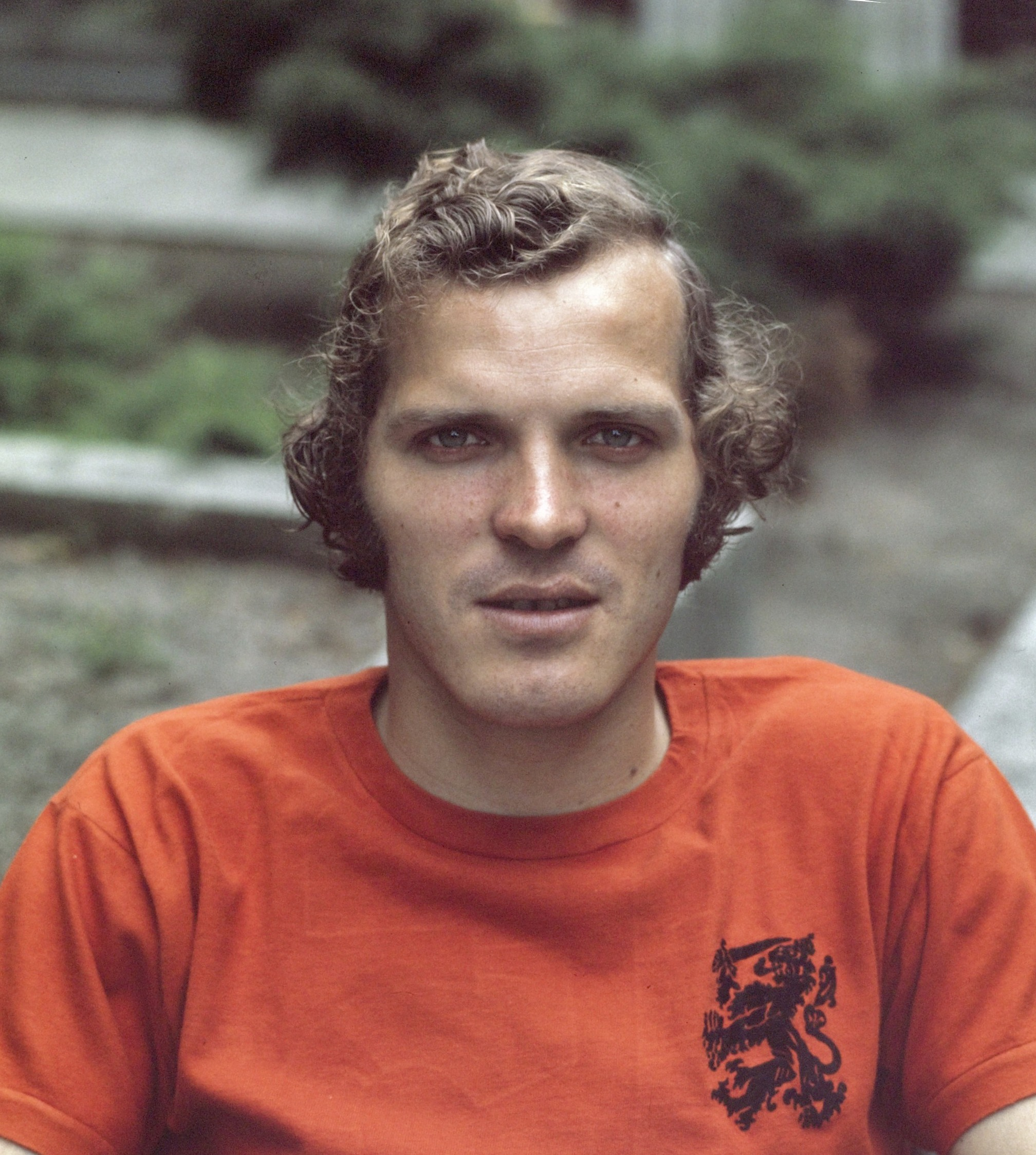
Willy van de Kerkhof, 1975

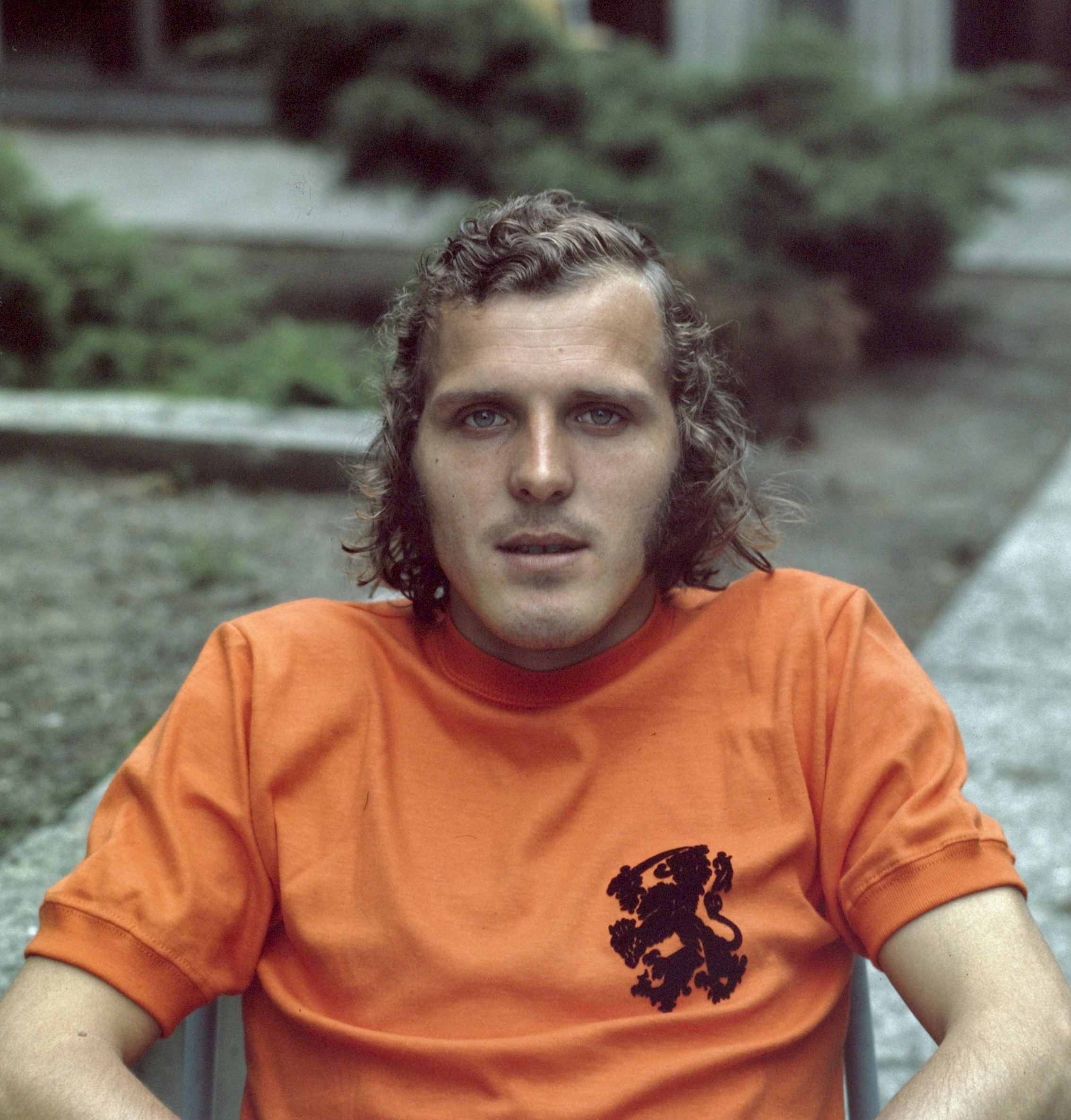
Rene van de Kerkhof, 1975

- Lucas Gassel (ca.1490–ca.1570) Flemish Renaissance painter of landscapes
- Anthonius Konings (1821–1884) a Redemptorist professor and theological writer.
- Theodorus Willem van Lidth de Jeude (1853–1937) a zoologist and herpetologist
- Matthijs Vermeulen (1888–1967) a composer and music journalist
- Willem Zeylmans van Emmichoven (1893–1961) a psychiatrist and anthroposophist
- Franz Jozef Van Beeck (1930–2011) a priest, author and Christian theologian
- Elly Blanksma-van den Heuvel (born 1959), politician and former bank manager, Mayor of Helmond since 2012
- Harry van Bommel (born 1962) a politician, anti-globalisation activist and former educator
- Diana van Berlo (born 1966), former member of disco/pop girl group Luv'
- Stochelo Rosenberg (born 1968) a Gypsy jazz guitarist who leads the Rosenberg Trio
- M. H. Benders (born 1971) a poet and philosopher

=== Sport ===
- Willy van der Kuijlen (1946–2021) football player with 545 club caps
- Lisette Sevens (born 1949) field hockey player, team gold medallist at the 1984 Summer Olympics
- René and Willy van de Kerkhof (born 1951), twins, former footballers with 491 & 511 club caps
- Fieke Boekhorst (born 1957) field hockey player, team gold medallist at the 1984 Summer Olympics
- Berry van Aerle (born 1962) a retired footballer with 315 club caps
- Hans Gillhaus (born 1963) a retired footballer with 400 club caps
- Pieter Gruijters (born 1967) is a Paralympic athlete
- Wilfred Bouma (born 1978) a former footballer with 411 club caps
- Nieky Holzken (born 1983) a super middleweight kickboxer and professional boxer
- Bob de Voogd (born 1988) a Dutch field hockey player, team silver medallist at the 2012 Summer Olympics
- Niels Vink (born 2002), champion wheelchair tennis player

== Twin towns – sister cities ==
Helmond is twinned with:

- Mechelen in Belgium
- San Marcos, Carazo in Nicaragua (since 1987)
- Zielona Góra in Poland (since 1993)

== Gallery ==
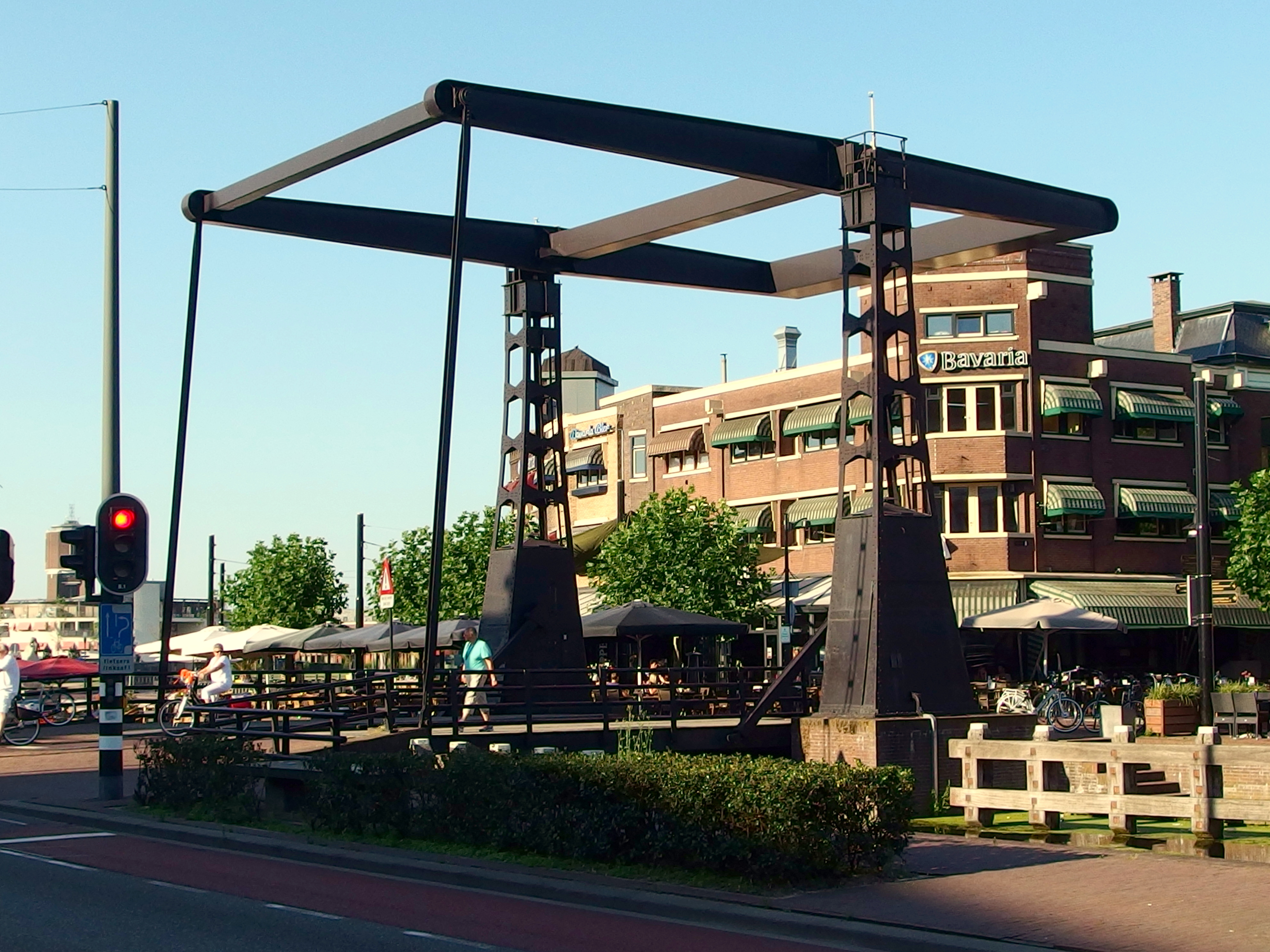
Bridge over Zuid-Willemsvaart in Helmond

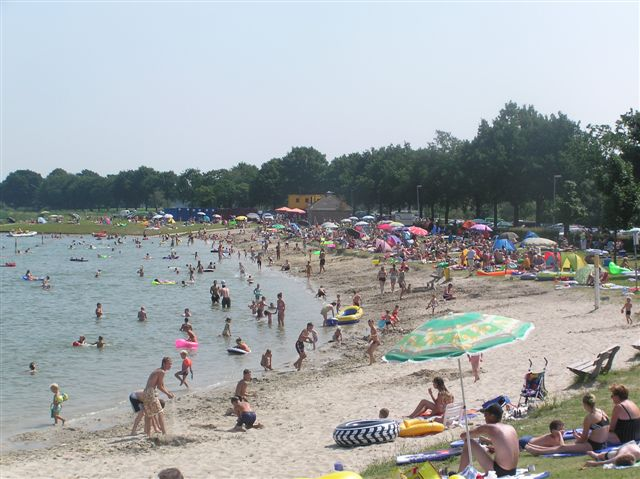
Beech at Berkendonk lake

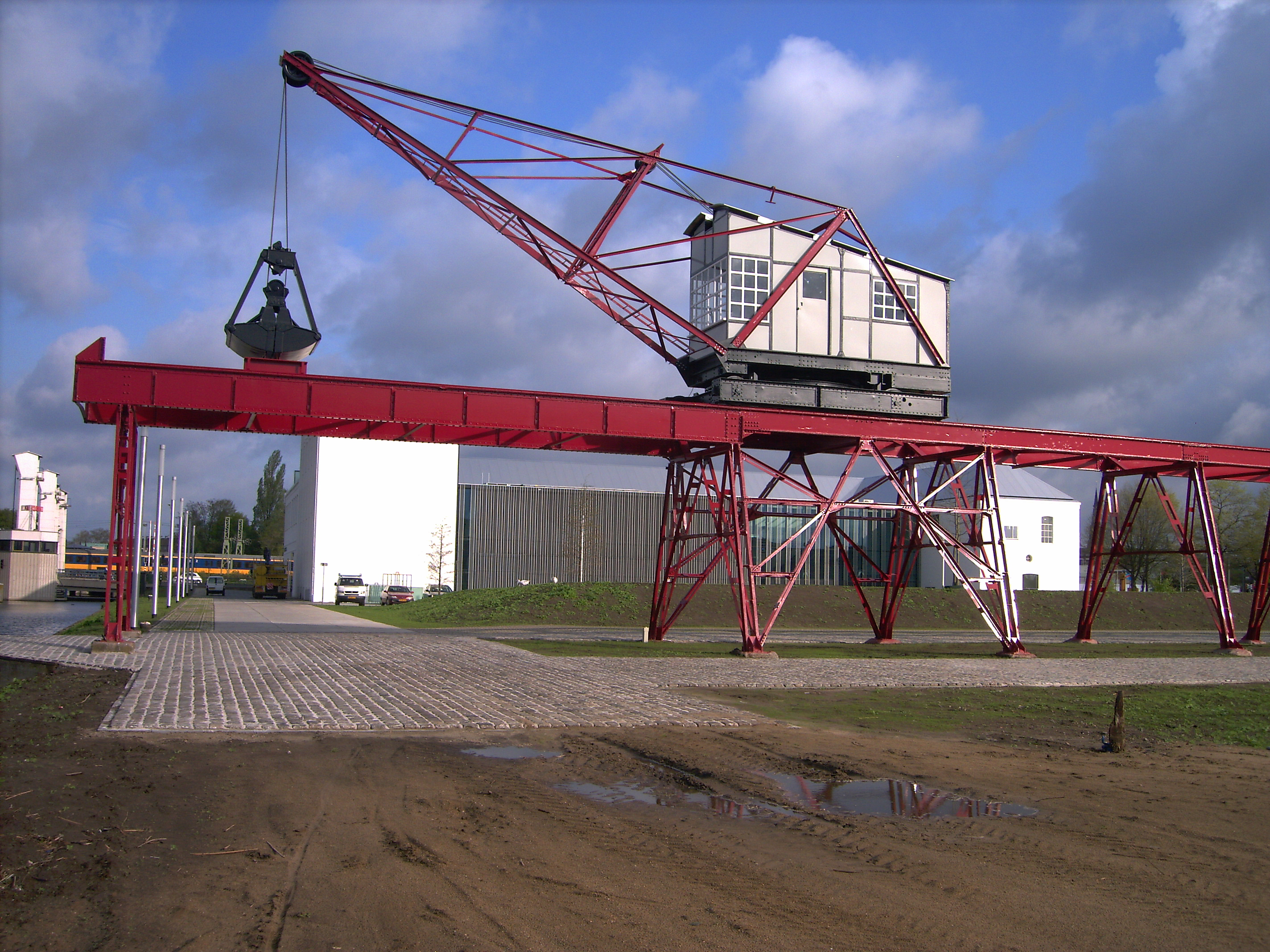
Helmond: crane at Kanaalduik zuid

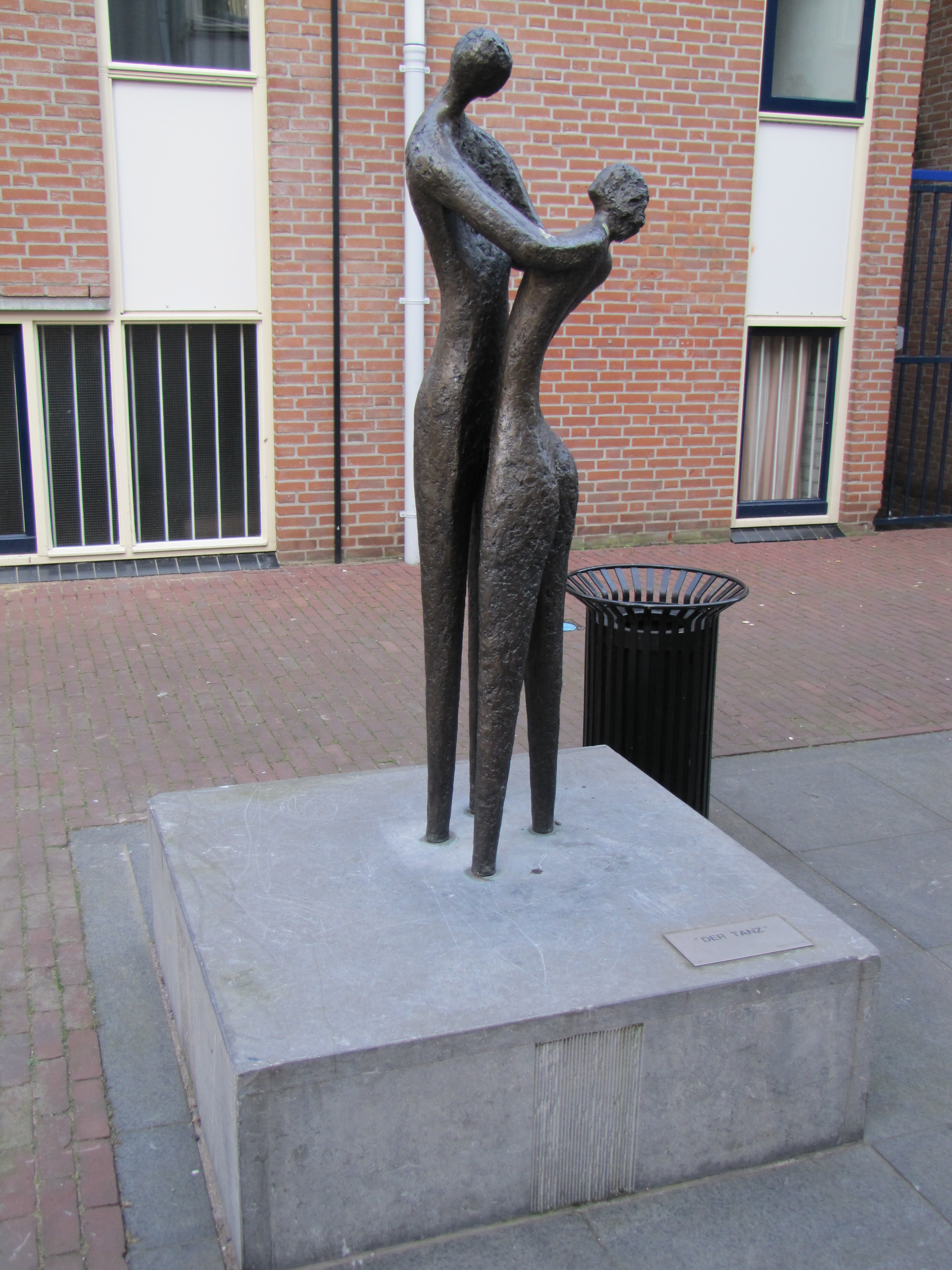
Helmond: The Dance, Dasha Stransky

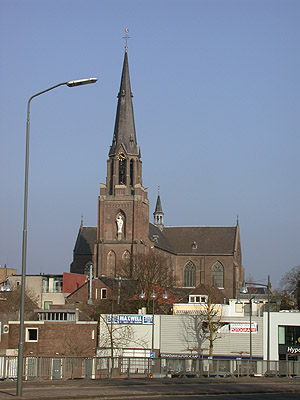
St. Lambert's Church

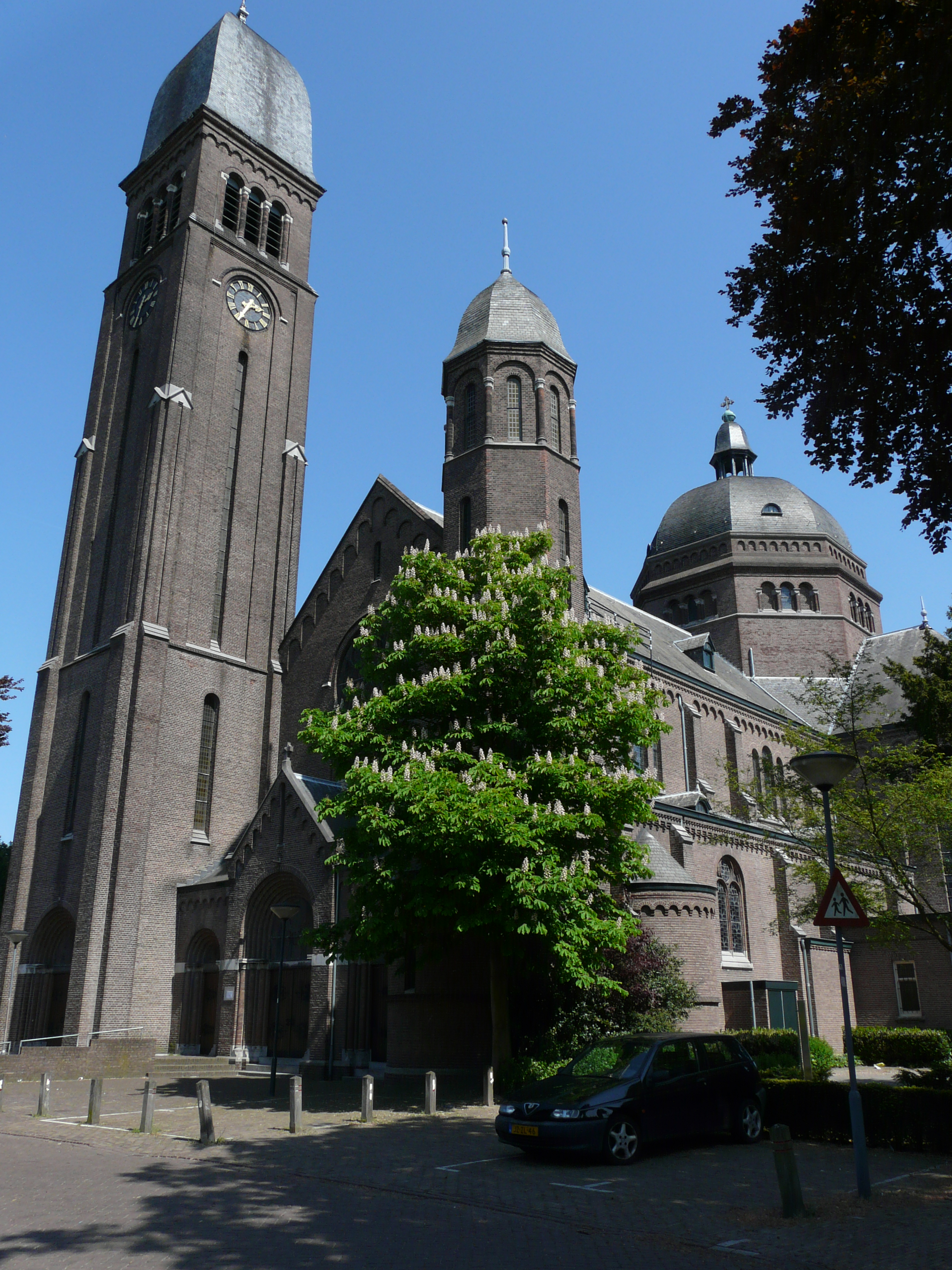
Church of Our Lady
