= Deurne railway station =

Railway station in the Netherlands

Deurne
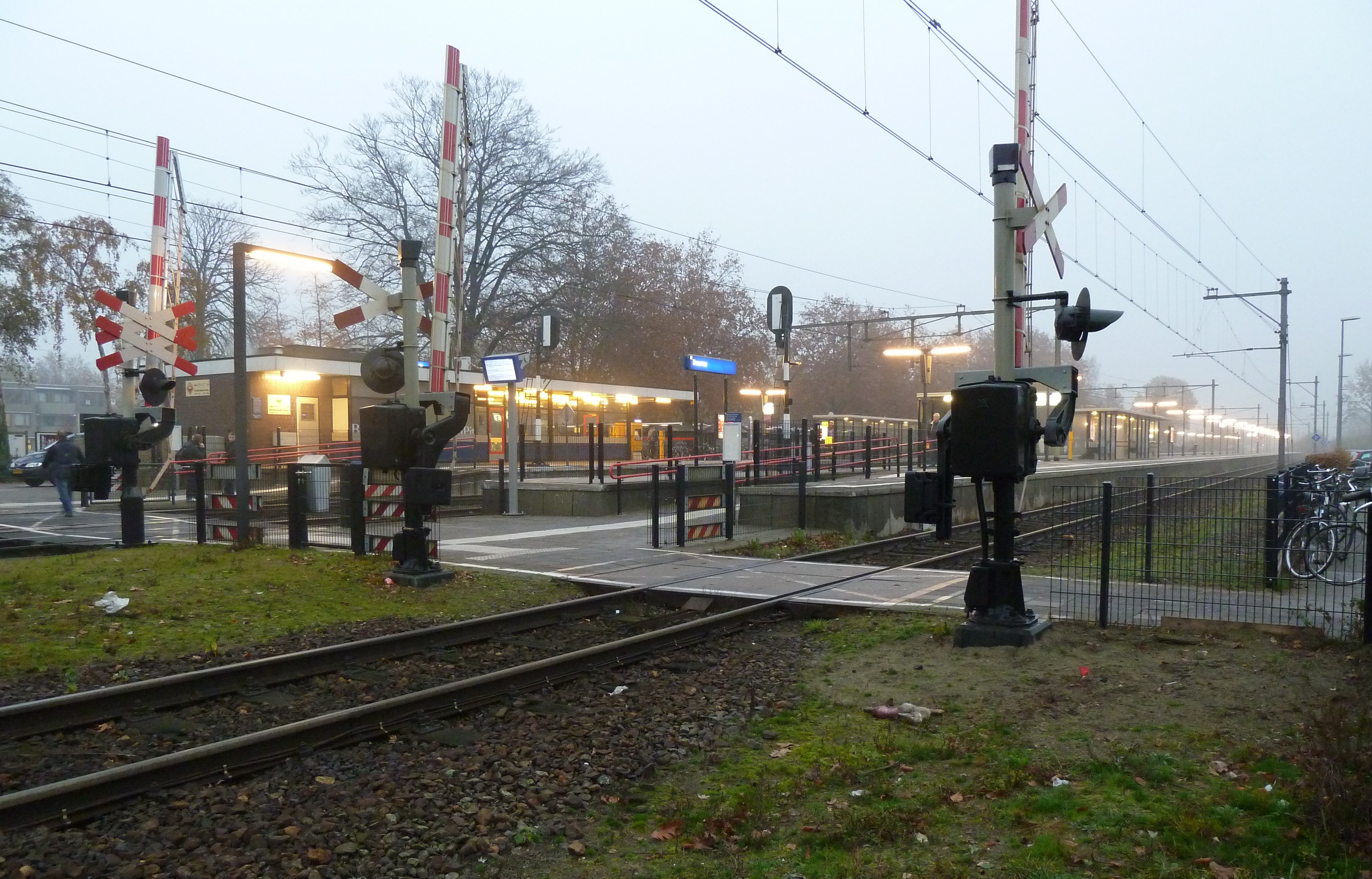

General information
- Location: Netherlands
- Coordinates: 51°27′21″N 5°47′18″E
- Line: Venlo–Eindhoven railway

History
- Opened: 1 November 1864; 161 years ago

Services
Preceding station	Nederlandse Spoorwegen	Following station
Helmond towards Dordrecht	NS Intercity 3500	Horst-Sevenum towards Venlo
Helmond Brouwhuis towards 's-Hertogenbosch	NS Sprinter 4400 Except AM Peak	Terminus
Helmond Brouwhuis towards Oss	NS Sprinter 4400 AM Peak	Terminus
Location
- Location within Netherlands

Deurne is a railway station in Deurne, Netherlands. The station opened on 1 November 1864 and is on the Venlo–Eindhoven railway. The station has 3 platforms, 1 where the sprinter from Eindhoven terminates.

== Train services ==
The following services call at Deurne:

- 2x per hour intercity services to Eindhoven, 's Hertogenbosch, Utrecht, Amsterdam and Schiphol Airport
- 2x per hour intercity services to Horst-Sevenum, Blerick and Venlo
- 2x per hour local services (stoptrein) Deurne, Helmond, Eindhoven, Boxtel, 's Hertogenbosch

== Bus services ==
Bus Service	Operator	From	To	Via	Frequency	Notes
28	Hermes	Deurne, Hogeweg (Centre)	Meijel, Busstation	Peellandcollege, Liessel, Neerkant	1x per hour	
80	Arriva	Deurne Railway Station	Venlo Railway Station	Ysselsteyn, Venray Busstation, Venray Railway Station, Horst-Sevenum Railway Station	2x per hour	
262	Hermes	Deurne, Ziekenhuis (Hospital)	Helenaveen, Hotel	Griendtsveen	1x per hour (not between 10 and 13)	Buurtbus
266	Hermes	Deurne, Ziekenhuis (Hospital)	Geldrop, Ziekenhuis (Hospital)	Vlierden, Ommel, Asten, Someren, Heeze	1x per 1,5 hour	Buurtbus
