= Oss railway station =

Railway station in the Netherlands

Oss
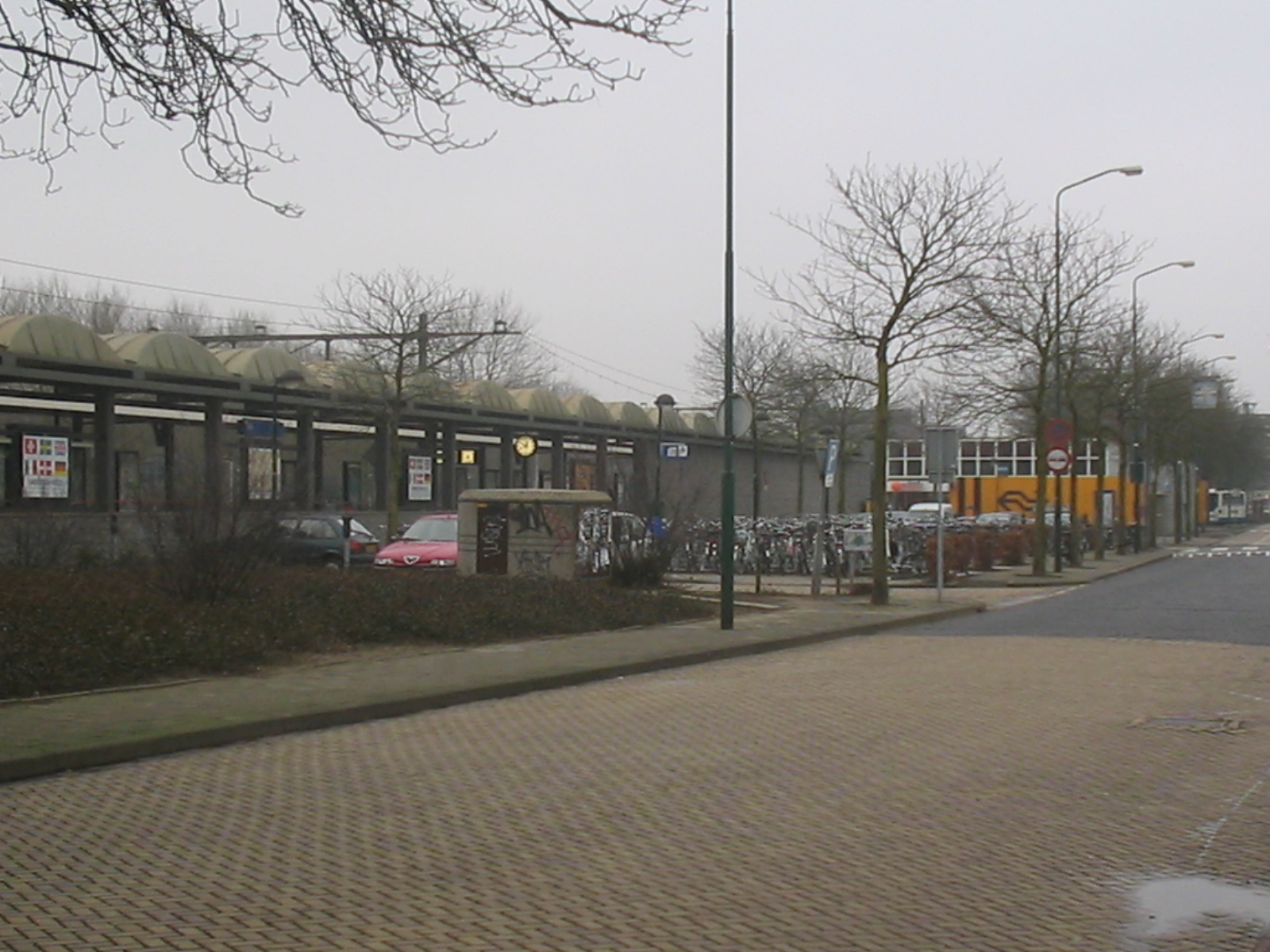

General information
- Location: Netherlands
- Coordinates: 51°45′55″N 5°31′54″E
- Line: Tilburg–Nijmegen railway

History
- Opened: 4 June 1881

Services
Preceding station	Nederlandse Spoorwegen	Following station
's-Hertogenbosch towards Roosendaal	NS Intercity 3600	Nijmegen towards Zwolle
Oss West towards Deurne	NS Sprinter 4400 AM Peak	Terminus
Oss West towards Dordrecht	NS Sprinter 6600 Mon-Sat until 19:00	Ravenstein towards Arnhem Centraal
Oss West towards Dordrecht	NS Sprinter 6600 After 19:00 and Sun	Ravenstein towards Nijmegen
Location
- Location within Netherlands

Oss is a railway station located in Oss, Netherlands. The station was opened on 4 June 1881 and is located on the Tilburg–Nijmegen railway. The train services are operated by Nederlandse Spoorwegen.

== Train services ==
The following services currently call at Oss:

- 2x per hour intercity services Zwolle - Deventer - Arnhem - Nijmegen - Oss - 's-Hertogenbosch - Roosendaal
- 2x per hour local services (sprinter) Nijmegen - Oss - 's-Hertogenbosch - Boxtel - Eindhoven - Helmond - Deurne
- 2x per hour local services (sprinter) Oss - 's-Hertogenbosch (peak service in peak direction).

== Bus services ==
There is a bus station outside the station. The following buses call at the station: City Community Bus: 1, 2 Bravo Regional Bus: 90, 96, 157 Bravo Direct Express Bus: 305 neighborhood bus 262, 294, 296, 662.

== Trivia ==
In the Netherlands, Oss is the country's shortest station name.
