= Geldrop railway station =

Railway station in the Netherlands

Geldrop
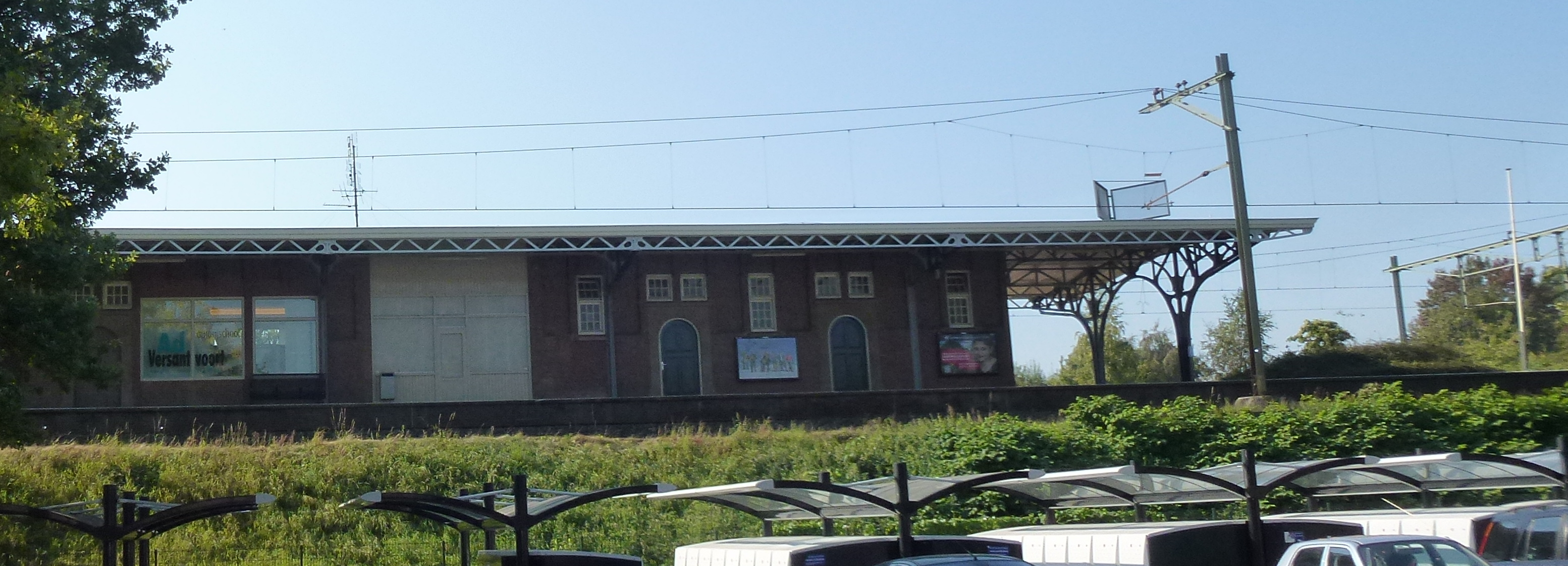

General information
- Location: Netherlands
- Coordinates: 51°25′12″N 5°33′04″E
- Line: Eindhoven–Weert railway

History
- Opened: 1 November 1913

Services
Preceding station	Nederlandse Spoorwegen	Following station
Eindhoven towards Tilburg Universiteit	NS Sprinter 6400	Heeze towards Weert
Location
- Location within Netherlands

Geldrop is a railway station located in Geldrop, a town in the Dutch municipality of Geldrop-Mierlo, in the province of North Brabant. The station was opened on 1 November 1913 and is located on the Eindhoven–Weert railway. The station is operated by Nederlandse Spoorwegen.

== Train service ==
The following services currently call at Geldrop:

- 2x per hour local services (sprinter) Eindhoven - Weert
