= Geldrop =

Geldrop, Netherlands
- Town and former municipality
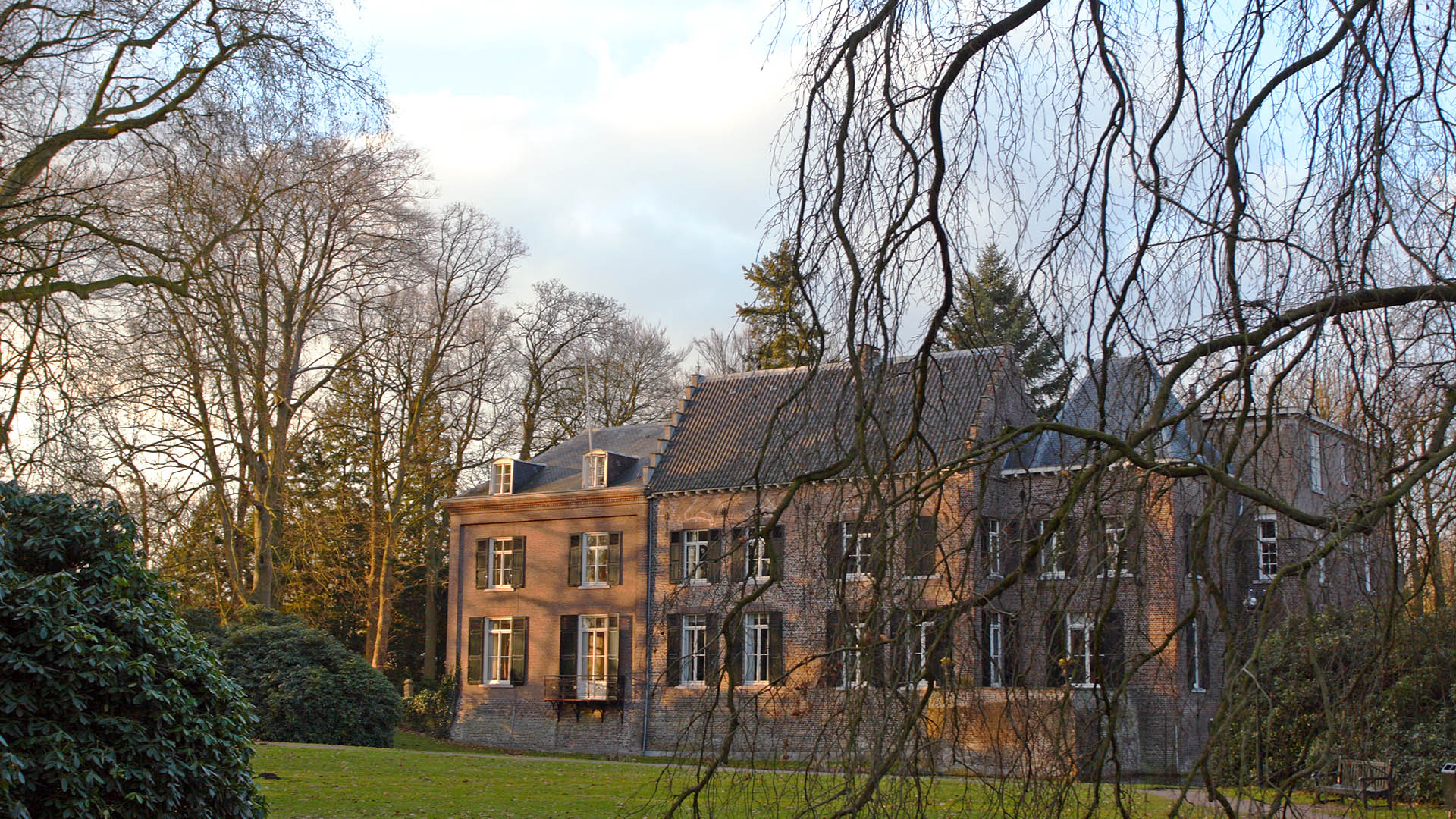
- Geldrop Castle

- Location in the province of North Brabant in the Netherlands Geldrop, Netherlands (Netherlands)
- Coordinates: 51°25′20″N 5°33′28″E
- Country: Netherlands
- Province: North Brabant
- Municipality: Geldrop-Mierlo

Area
  - Total: 13.36 km^{2} (5.16 sq mi)
- Elevation: 21 m (69 ft)

Population (2023)
  - Total: 29,245
  - Density: 2,189/km^{2} (5,669/sq mi)
- Time zone: UTC+1 (CET)
  - Summer (DST): UTC+2 (CEST)
- Postal code: 5660-5667
- Dialing code: 040

Geldrop is a town in the Dutch province of North Brabant. It is in the municipality of Geldrop-Mierlo, around 5km (3 miles) east of Eindhoven's city centre. Geldrop was a separate municipality until 2004, when it merged with Mierlo.

As of 2023, Geldrop has a population of approximately 29.245 residents.

Geldrop is noted for having a neighbourhood with streets named after characters and elements from the works of J. R. R. Tolkien.

== Geography ==
Geldrop is situated near the city of Eindhoven, making it part of the Eindhoven metropolitan area. The village is characterized by its picturesque settings, surrounded by natural landscapes including forests and meadows which are part of the larger Strabrechtse Heide, an extensive heathland area.

The A67 motorway (part of European route E34) links Geldrop with Eindhoven.

Geldrop railway station is on the Eindhoven–Weert line.

== History ==
Geldrop has proven a fertile ground for archaeological digs, with finds from various historical and prehistorical eras. Through the years, several archaeological finds were made which testify to prehistoric occupants.

Finds in the south of Zesgehuchten (a district of Geldrop) indicate small settlements from the New Stone Age (about 3000 BC).

Finds from the Roman Period and the early Middle Ages have been found off Genoenhuis and Hoog Geldrop (districts in Geldrop). In the autumn of 1989, archaeological diggings at the nearby 't Zand Cemetery found four settlements from the late Roman Period and the Middle Ages: a period which covers the years between 350 and 1225 AD.

The history of Geldrop itself dates back to the Middle Ages, and it was first mentioned in historical records in 1296. Over the centuries, it developed from a small agricultural community into a more industrially oriented village by the 19th century, with textiles becoming a significant industry.

== Economy ==
While historically reliant on the textile industry, modern Geldrop has diversified its economy. Today, it hosts a variety of businesses and services, with significant contributions from the healthcare, retail, and manufacturing sectors. Geldrop benefits economically from its close proximity to the technological and industrial hub of Eindhoven.

== Gallery ==
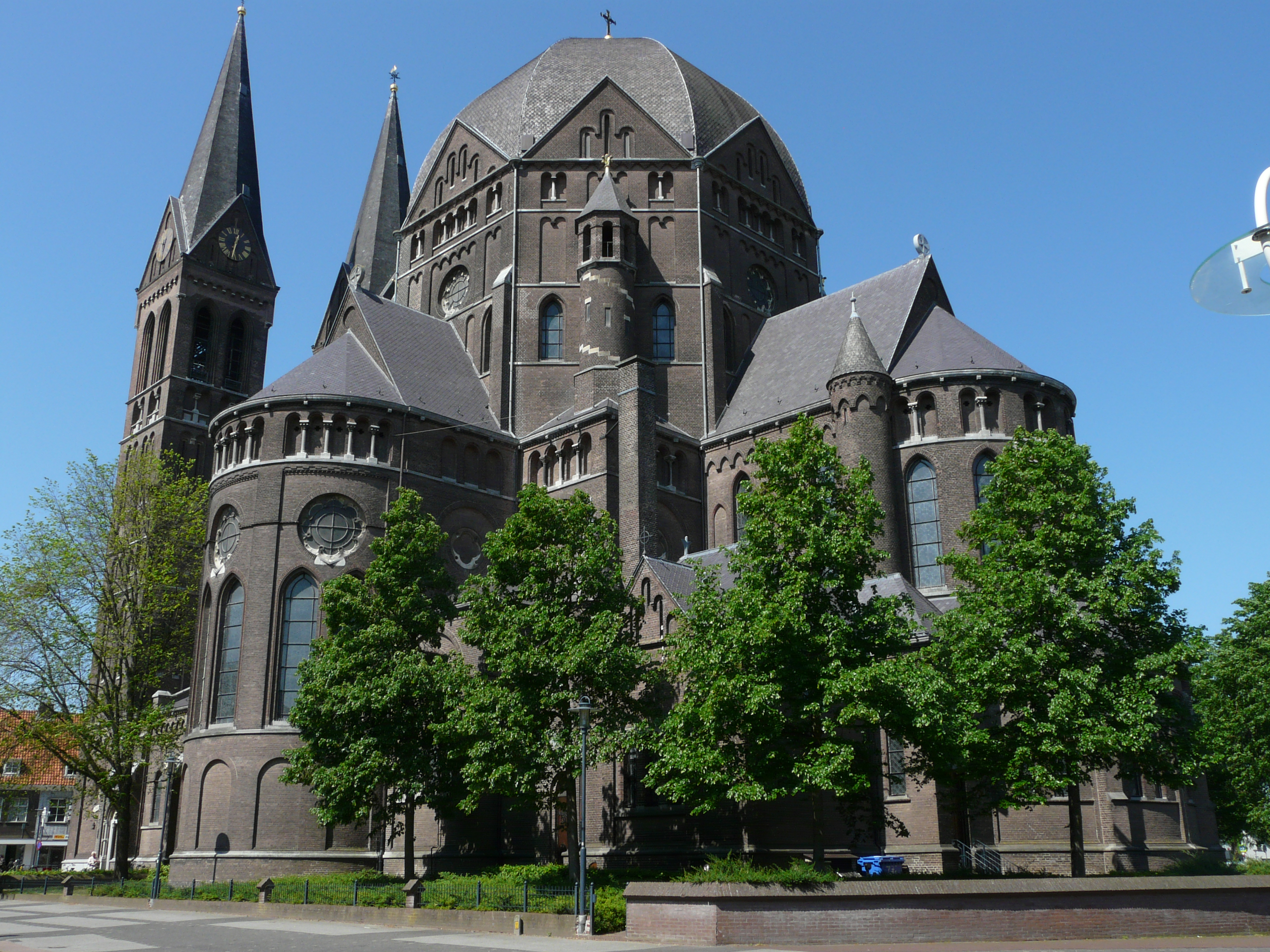
Geldrop, church: Sint Brigidakerk

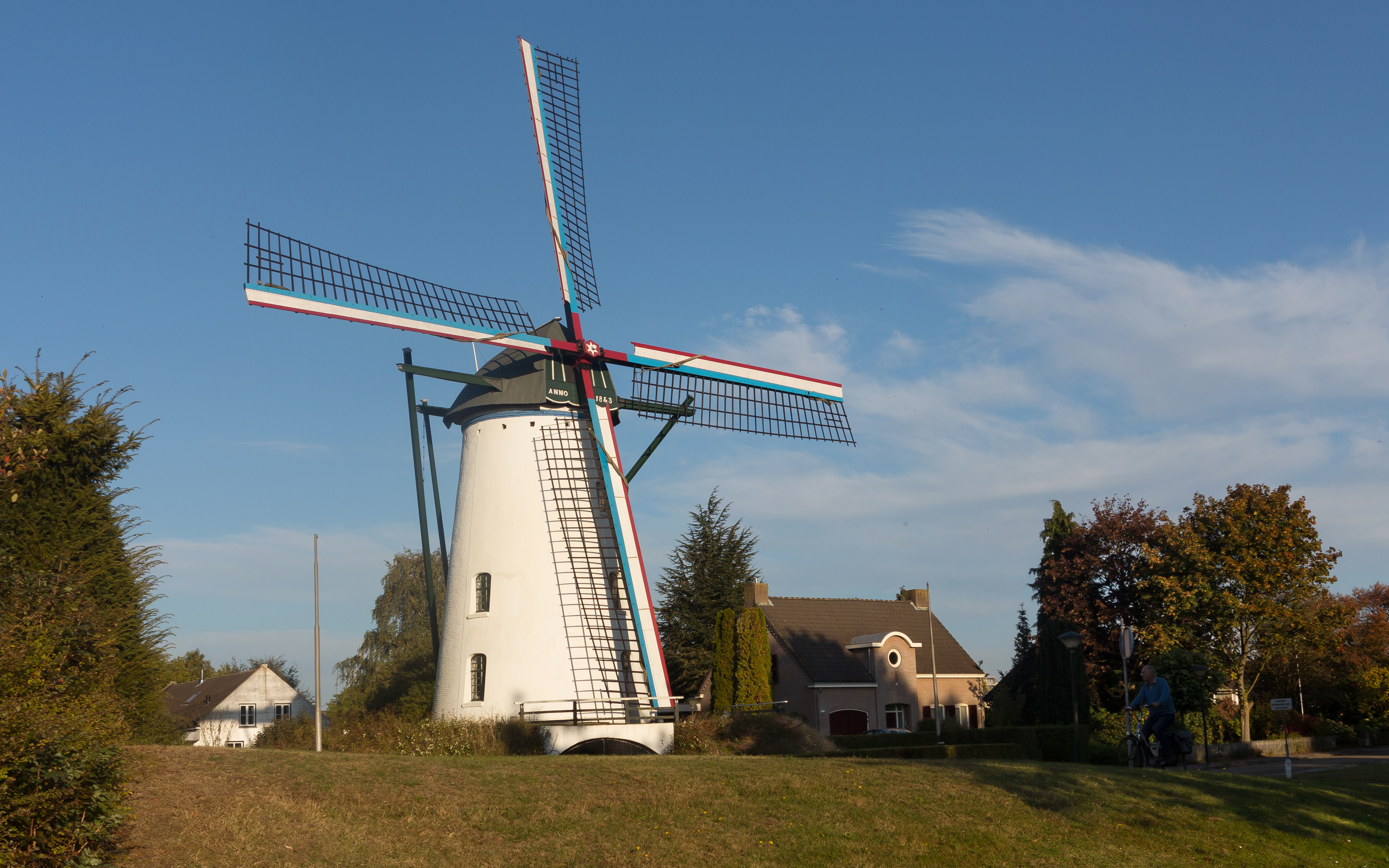
Geldrop, windmill: korenmolen 't Nupke

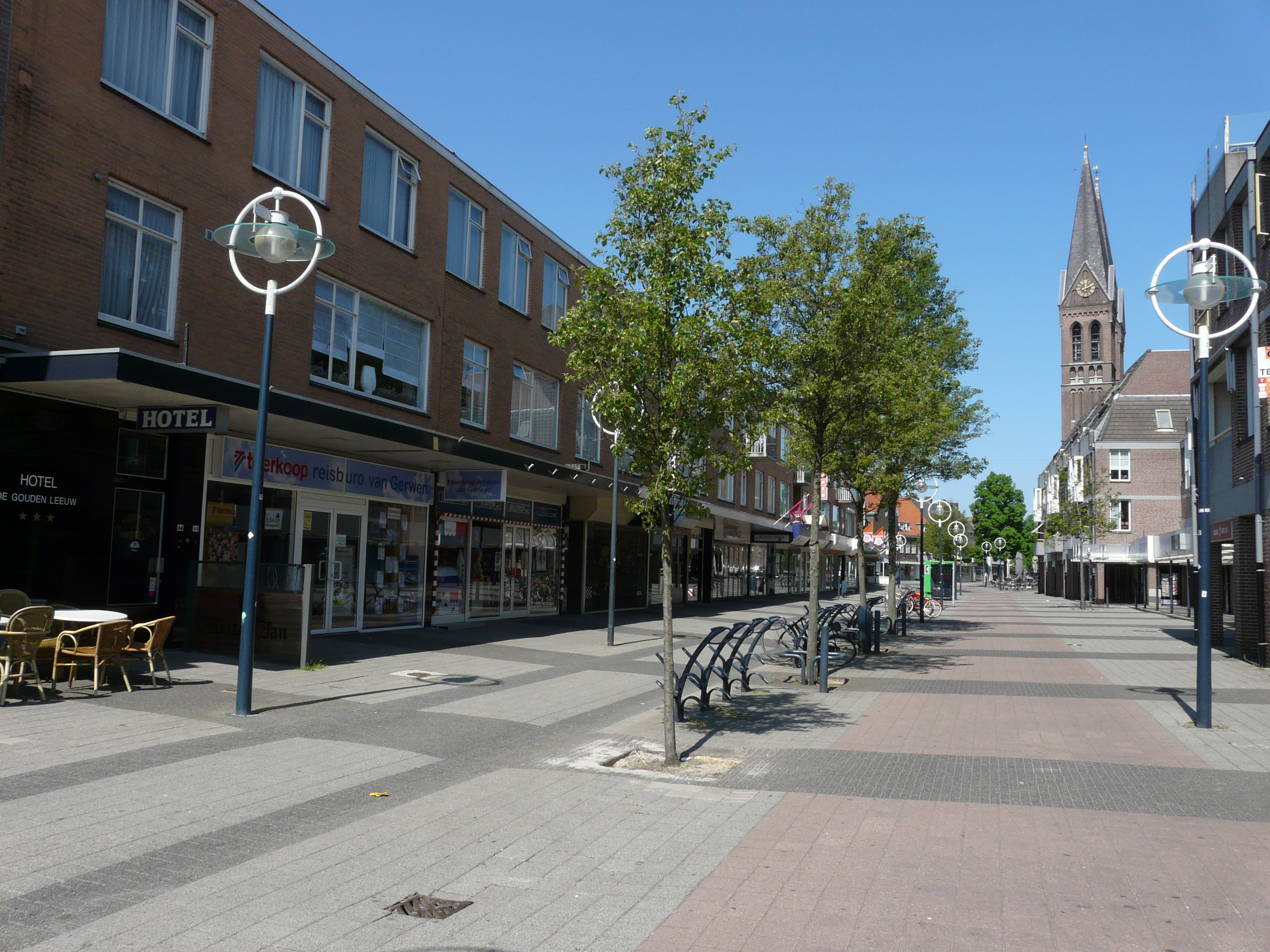
Centre of Geldrop

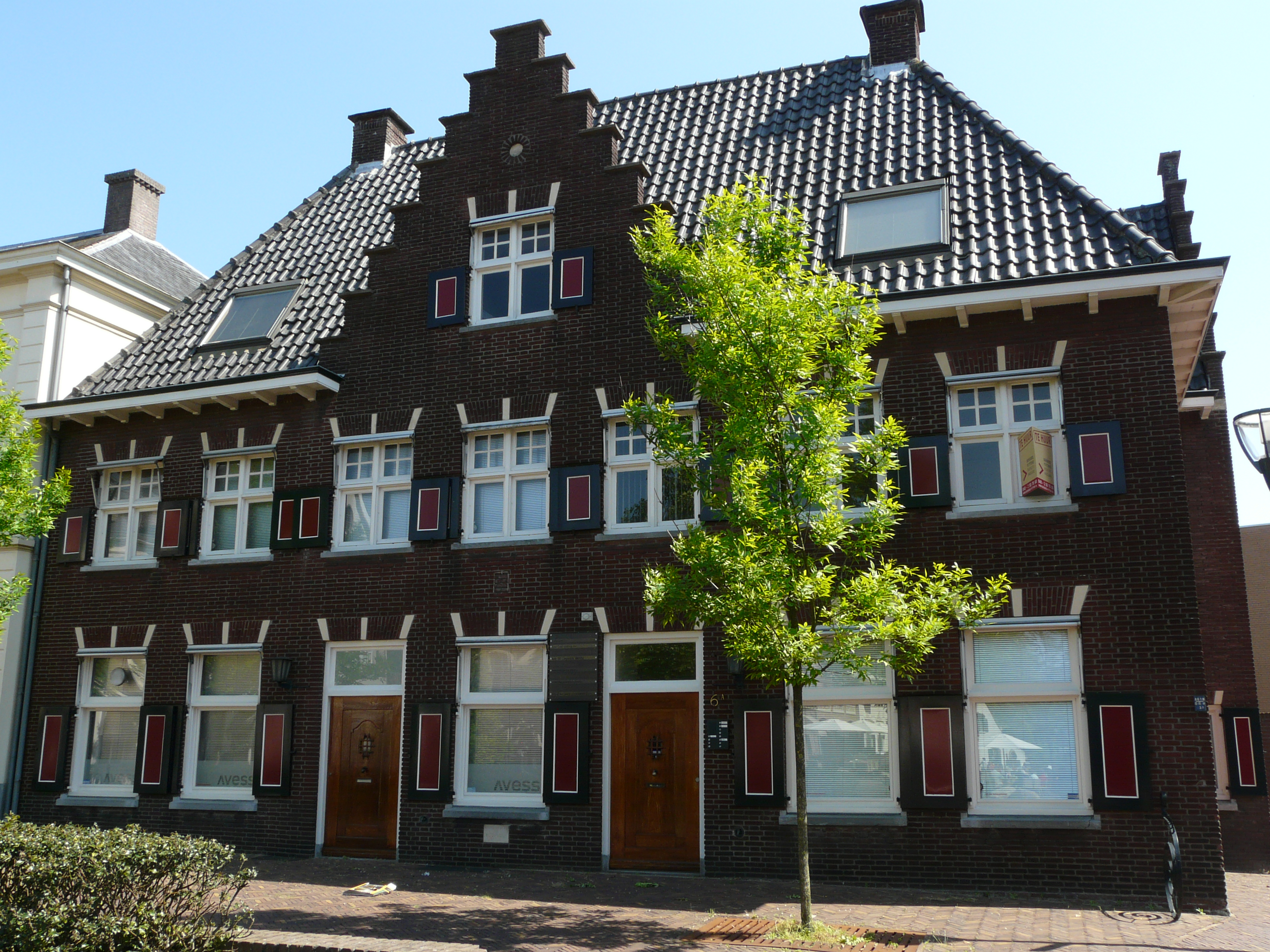
Building at Heuvel, 6

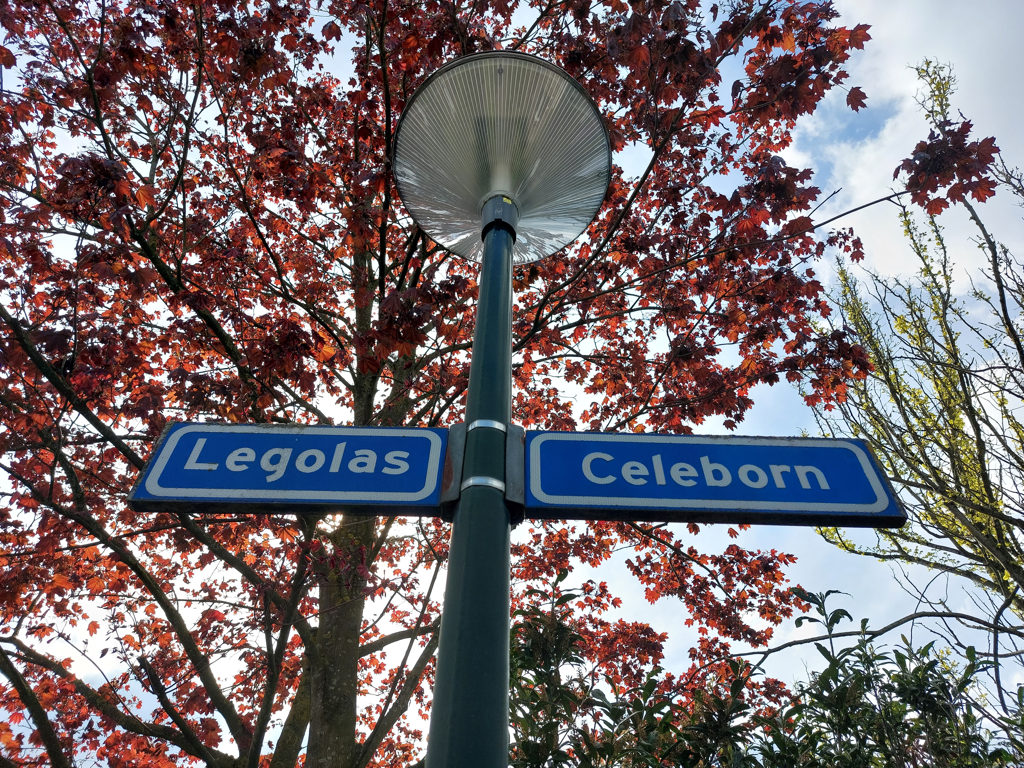
Legolas and Celeborn street in Geldrop

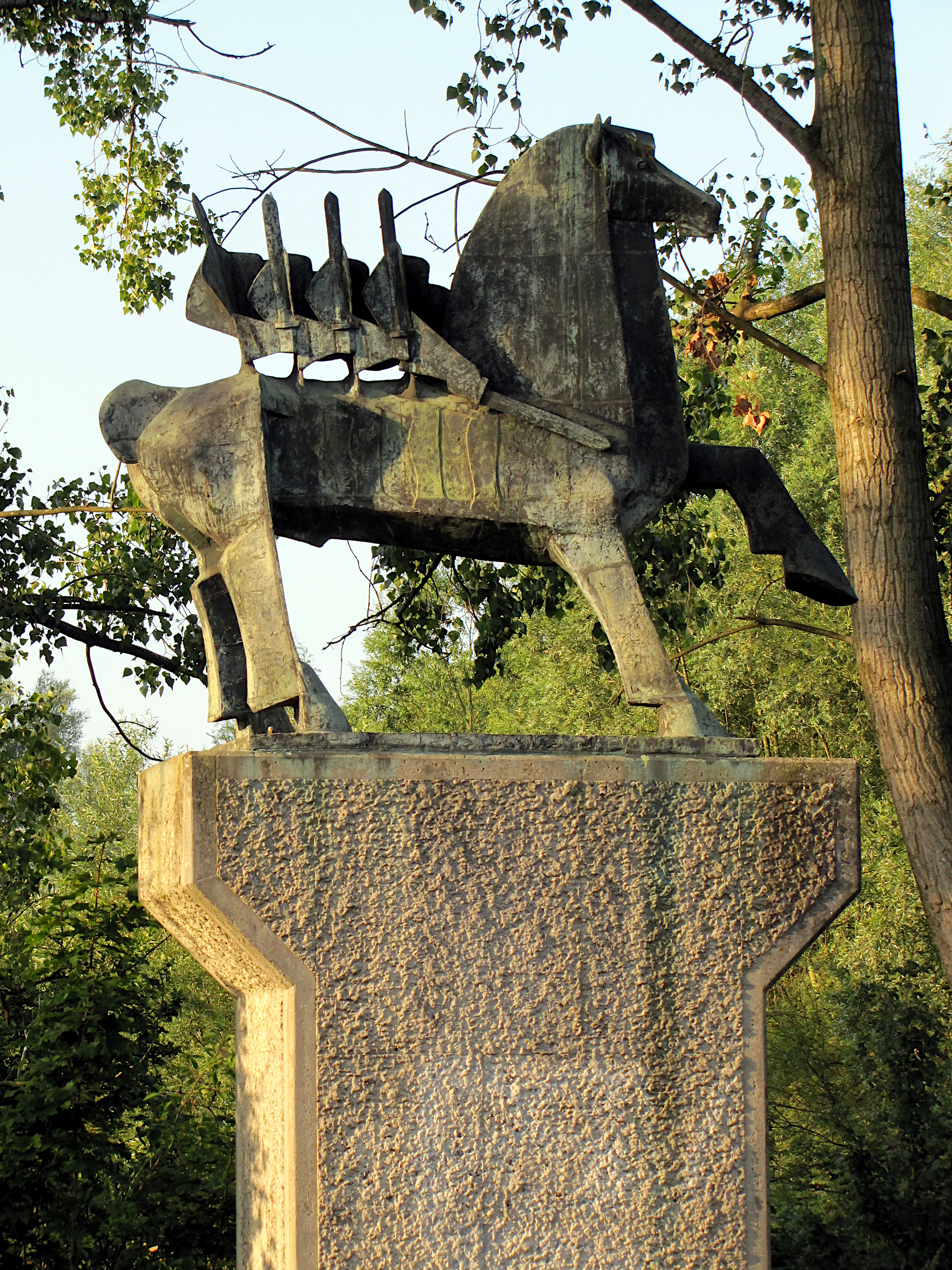
Statue of the steed Bayard

== Famous people from Geldrop ==
- Dries van Agt (born 1931), former prime minister
- Ernest Faber (born 1971), footballer for PSV and the Netherlands national football team
- A. F. Th. van der Heijden (born 1951), writer
- Jeffrey Herlings (born 1994), motocross world champion
- Pieter van den Hoogenband (born 1978), swimmer, Winner Olympic Gold
- Viktor Horsting (born 1969), fashion designer
- Guido Imbens (born 1963), Economist, Winner of the Nobel Memorial Prize in Economic Sciences
- Roos van Montfort (born 1989), Playboy model
- Cas Mudde (born 1967), political scientist
- Lara Stone (born 1983), model
- Art Rooijakkers (born 1976), television presenter
- Kelly van Santvoort (born 1992), communicator
