= Heeze railway station =

Railway station in the Netherlands

Heeze
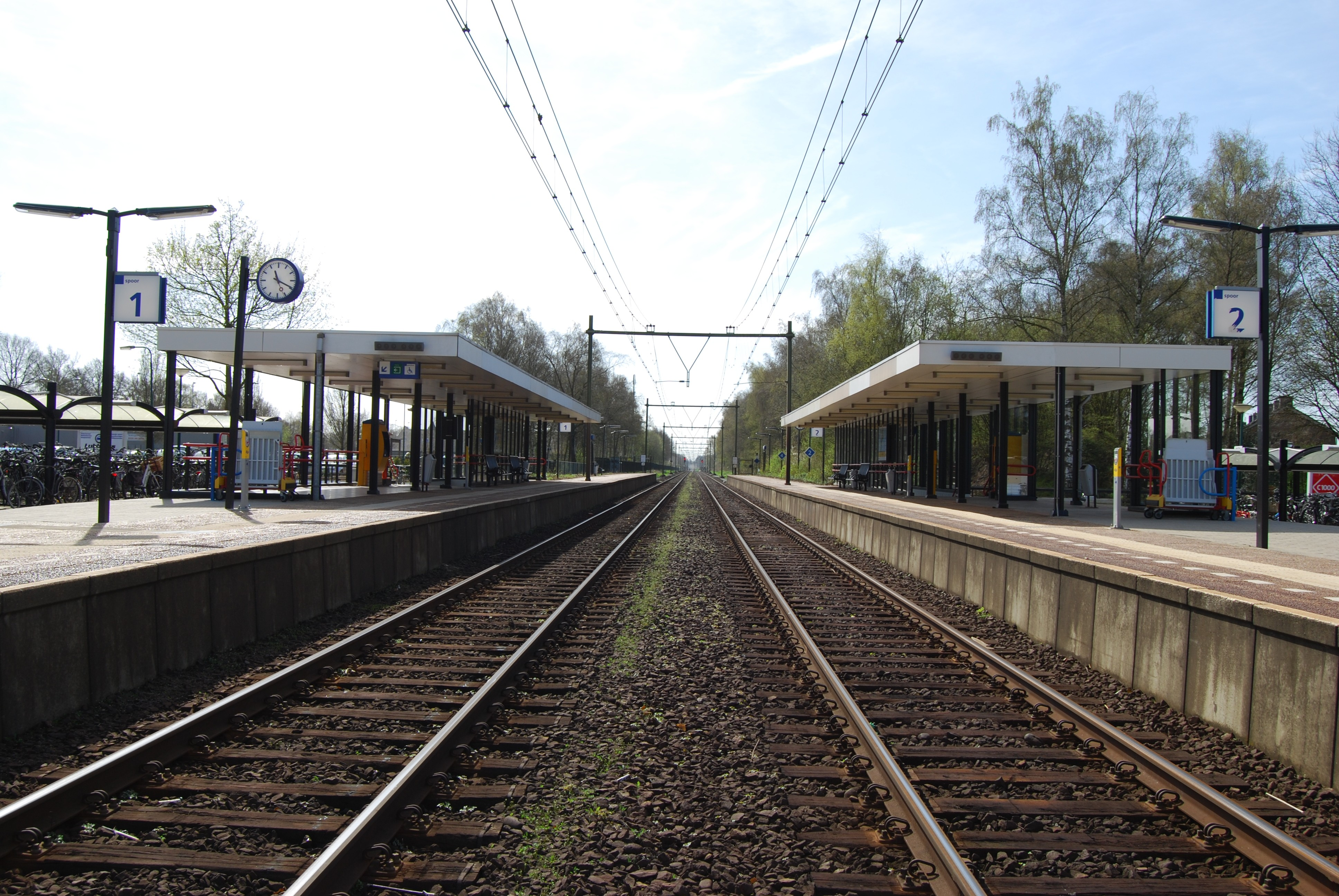

General information
- Location: Netherlands
- Coordinates: 51°23′06″N 5°34′10″E
- Line: Eindhoven–Weert railway

History
- Opened: 1 May 1977

Services
Preceding station	Nederlandse Spoorwegen	Following station
Geldrop towards Tilburg Universiteit	NS Sprinter 6400	Maarheeze towards Weert
Location
- Location within Netherlands

Heeze is a railway station in Heeze, Netherlands. The station opened on 1 May 1977 and is on the Eindhoven–Weert railway. The services are operated by Nederlandse Spoorwegen. The first station was 1 km away from its current location and was called Heeze-Leende. This station opened on 1 November 1913 and closed on 1 May 1977, although was closed for 2 months in 1945.

== Train service ==
The following services calls at Heeze:

- 2x per hour local services (sprinter) Eindhoven - Weert
