= Maarheeze railway station =

Railway station in the Netherlands

Maarheeze
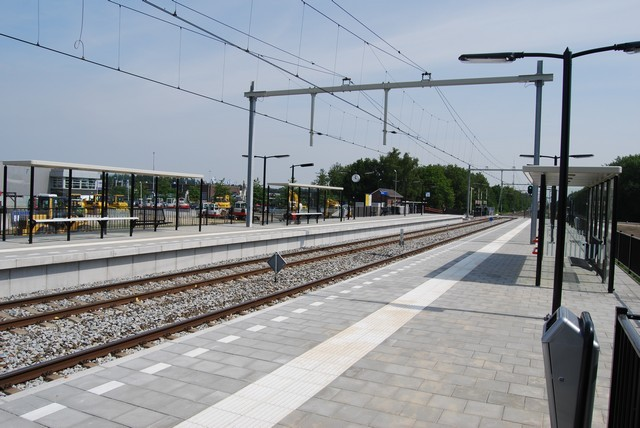

General information
- Location: Netherlands
- Coordinates: 51°18′14″N 5°37′49″E
- Line: Eindhoven–Weert railway

History
- Opened: 2010

Services
Preceding station	Nederlandse Spoorwegen	Following station
Heeze towards Tilburg Universiteit	NS Sprinter 6400	Weert Terminus
Location
- Location within Netherlands

Maarheeze is a railway station in Maarheeze, the Netherlands.

== History ==
Maarheeze had a station, closer to the centre which opened on 1 November 1913 and closed on 15 May 1938. A new station further south, next to the Philips buildings, was opened on 13 June 2010. The station lies on the Eindhoven–Weert railway and is located between Heeze and Weert.

Residents of Maarheeze have been asking for a station together since 2004. Construction work has started in October 2009.

With an interchange at Eindhoven passengers are able to reach many major places in the Netherlands, such as: Amsterdam, Utrecht, Amsterdam Airport Schiphol, The Hague, Venlo and Eindhoven Airport (by bus). In Weert passengers can change to trains towards Roermond, Maastricht and Heerlen.

== Train service ==
The following services currently call at the station:

- 2x per hour local services (sprinter) Eindhoven - Weert

== Bus service ==
The following bus services call at Maarheeze:

- Hermes line 173 Eindhoven - Leende - Budel - Weert
