= Rianne Donders-de Leest =

Dutch politician

M.J.D. "Rianne" Donders-de Leest (born 22 July 1960, in Eindhoven) is a Dutch politician for the Christian Democratic Appeal (CDA).

Donders-de Leest started her career as a teacher at a primary school. She was elected to the municipal council of Etten-Leur in 1990, eventually serving as leader of the CDA group. In 2000 she also became an alderman, dealing with spatial planning, traffic, transportation, housing and sports.

From September 2004 to January 2015 she was mayor of the municipality of Geldrop-Mierlo. In January 2015 she became Mayor of Roermond. She was appointed for a second term in January 2021, but resigned in October 2022, after disputes with thr municipal council. She served as acting Mayor of Maashorst from December 2022 to March 2024, and became acting Mayor of Best in March 2025.

Married with three children, her son Pim died while aboard Afriqiyah Airways Flight 771 which crashed near Tripoli in May 2010.
