= Zesgehuchten =

Coordinates: 51°25′16″N 5°32′16″E

- Voormalige gemeente
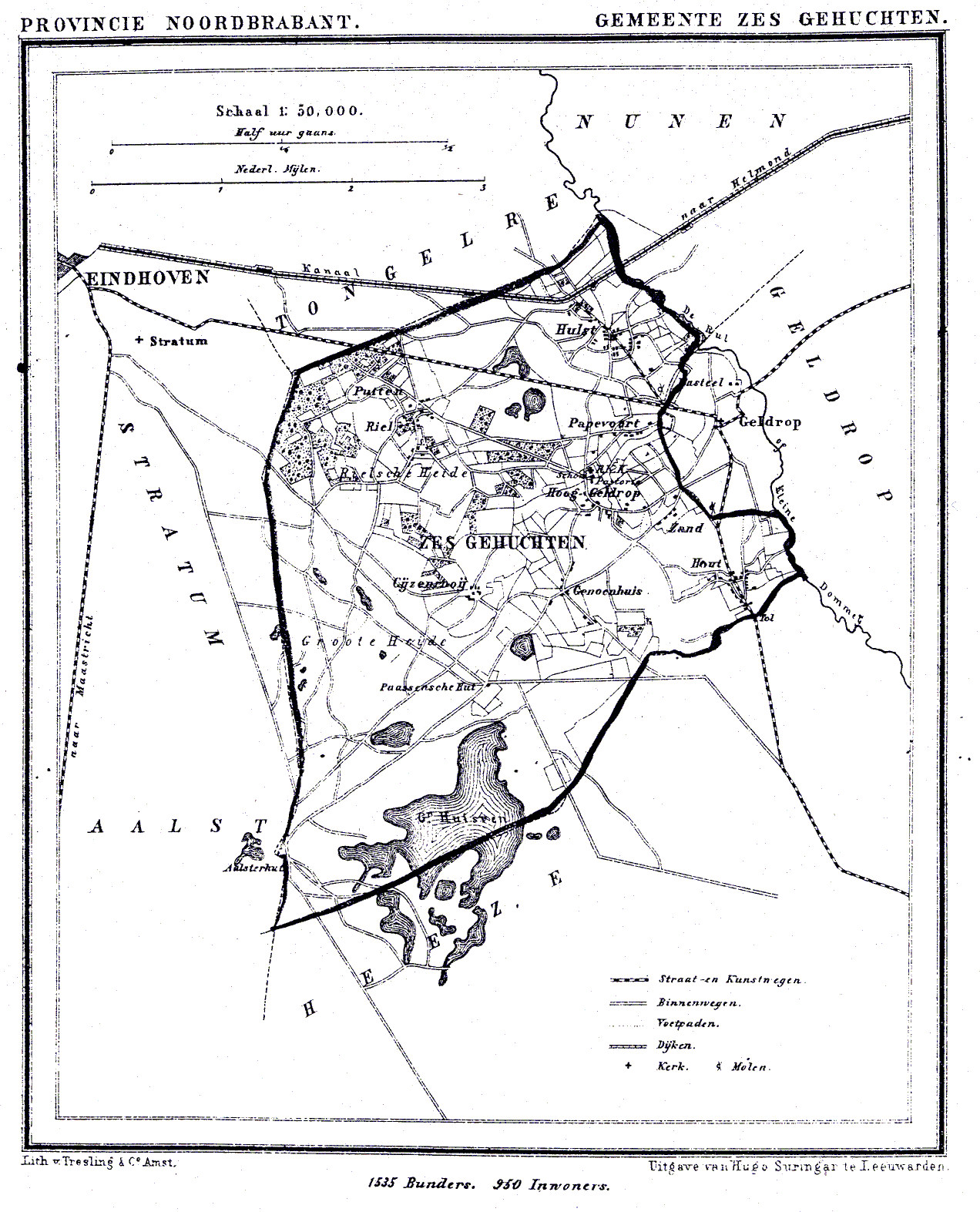
- Zesgehuchten in 1866
- Country: Netherlands
- Province: North Brabant

Zesgehuchten was a municipality in the Dutch province of North Brabant. It existed until 1921, when it became part of Geldrop. In 1972, part of its former territory was transferred to Eindhoven.

The name Zesgehuchten means "six hamlets", referring to Gijzenrooi, Genoenhuis, Hulst, Hoog Geldrop, Hout, and Riel. Only Riel and Gijzenrooi exist as separate hamlets today; the other four have been incorporated into Geldrop's town limits.
