= Geldrop-Mierlo =

- Municipality
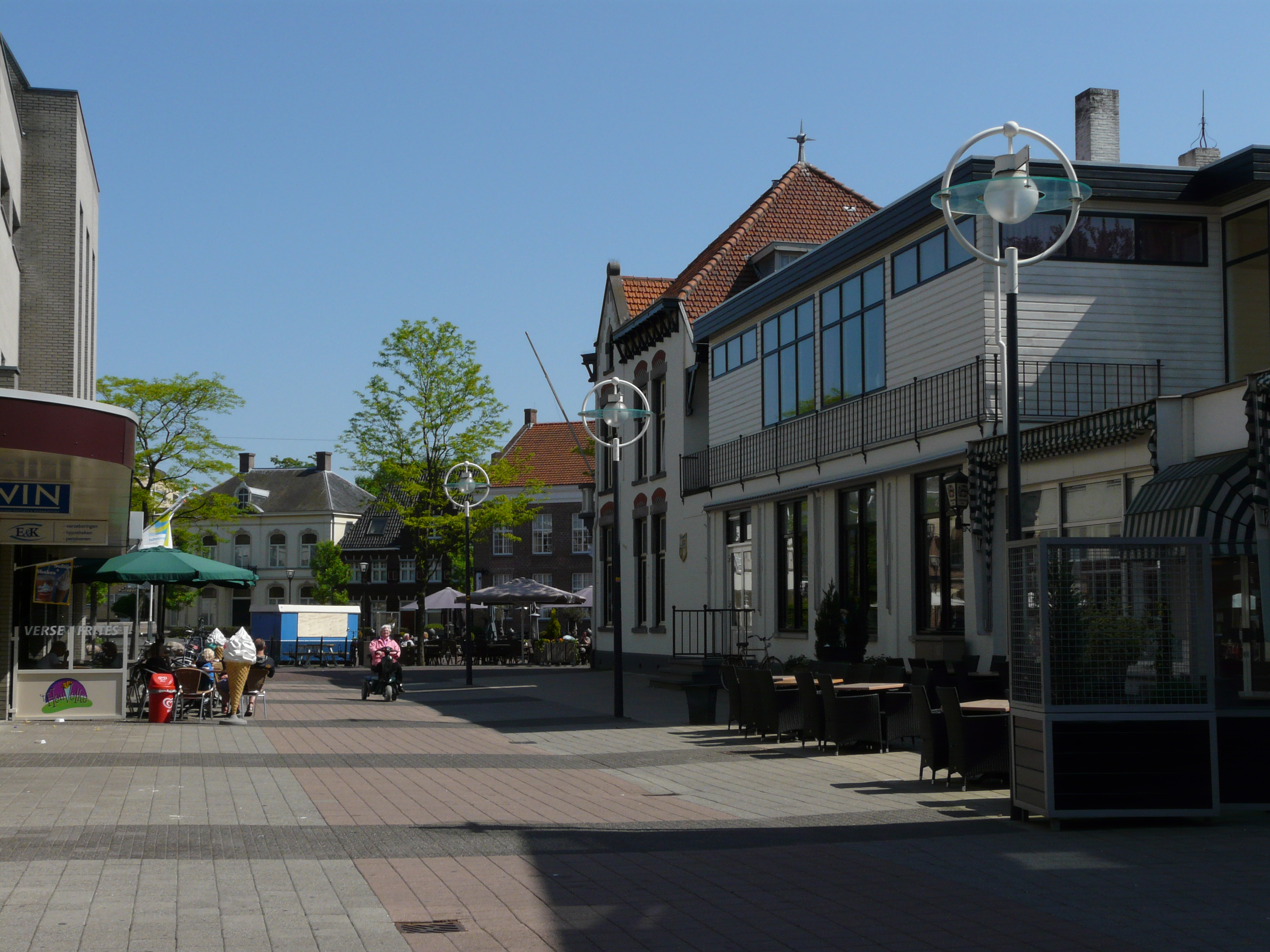
- Geldrop town centre

- Flag Coat of arms

- Location in North Brabant
- Coordinates: 51°25′N 5°34′E
- Country: Netherlands
- Province: North Brabant
- Established: 1 January 2004

Government
  - Body: Municipal council
  - Mayor: Jos van Bree (VVD)

Area
  - Total: 31.39 km^{2} (12.12 sq mi)
  - Land: 31.01 km^{2} (11.97 sq mi)
  - Water: 0.38 km^{2} (0.15 sq mi)
- Elevation: 19 m (62 ft)

Population (January 2021)
  - Total: 40,066
  - Density: 1,292/km^{2} (3,350/sq mi)
- Time zone: UTC+1 (CET)
  - Summer (DST): UTC+2 (CEST)
- Postcode: 5660–5667, 5730–5731
- Area code: 040, 0492
- Website: www.geldrop-mierlo.nl

Geldrop-Mierlo (Dutch pronunciation: [ˌɣɛldrɔp ˈmiːrloː]) is a municipality in southern Netherlands, in the province of North Brabant. The municipality was created by the merger of the two former municipalities of Geldrop and Mierlo on 1 January 2004.

== Villages ==
Geldrop-Mierlo had a population of 40,066 in 2021. It covers an area of 31.39 km^{2} (12.12 sq mi). The two villages of Geldrop and Mierlo used to be separate municipalities, but joined together after threats from Helmond to take over Mierlo.

=== Topography ===
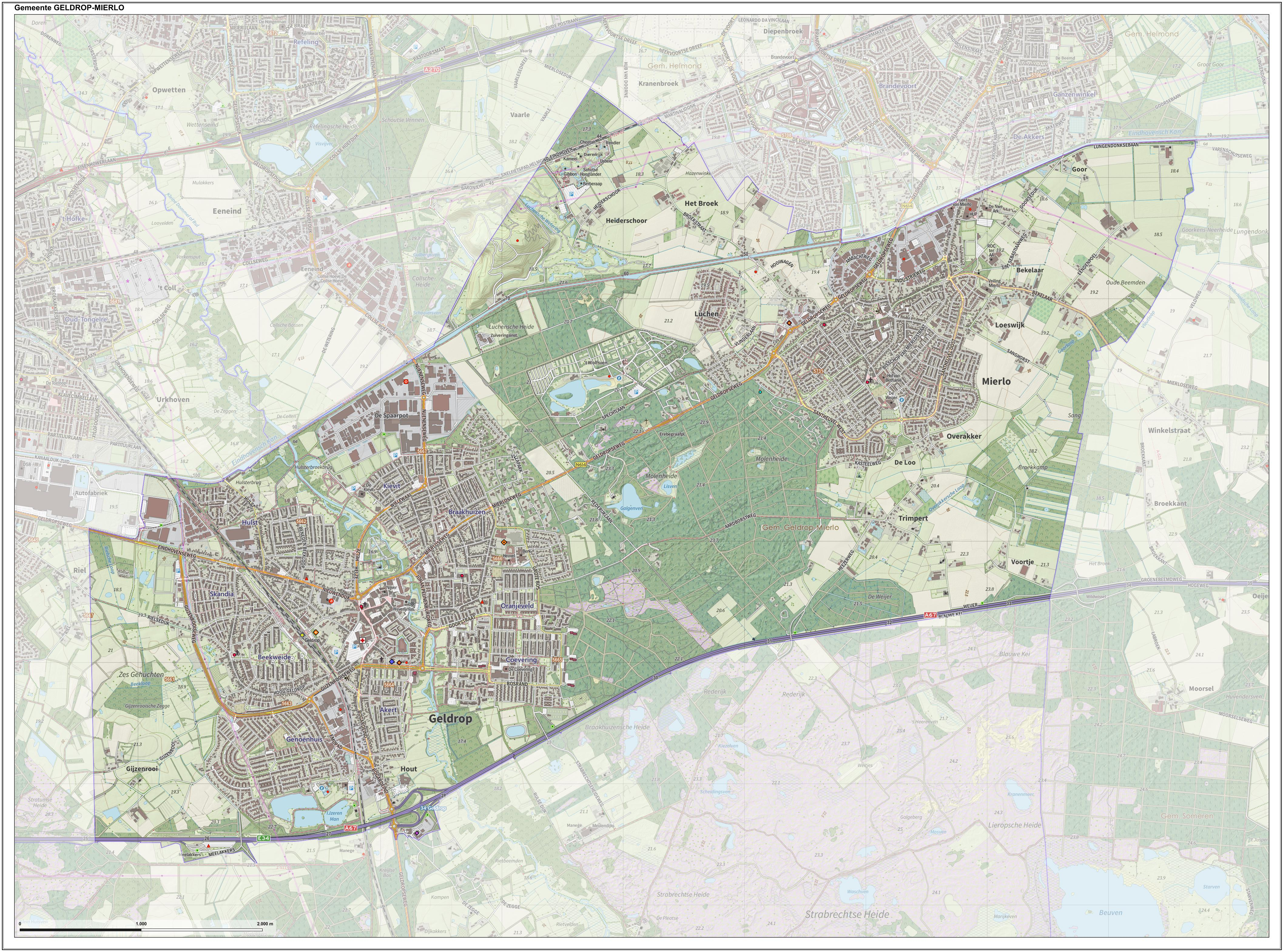

Map of the municipality of Geldrop-Mierlo, June 2015

== History ==
Over the years there have been several archaeological finds relating to prehistoric peoples who lived in or passed through the area. In the area of Geldrop, where over 10,000 years ago reindeer hunters of the so-called Ahrensburg culture camped, artifacts found include two engravings. On shows a reindeer horn, the other a dancing girl, called 'venus van Mierlo'. In the south of Zesgehuchten (district of Geldrop) finds indicate small settlements from the New Stone Age (around 3000 BC). Finds from the Roman period and the early Middle Ages have been found off Genoenhuis and Hoog Geldrop (districts in Geldrop). In the autumn of 1989 nearby 't Zand (cemetery) archaeological excavations were carried out. Four settlements were found from the late Roman Time and the Middle Ages: a period which covers the years between 350 and 1225.

== Transportation ==
- Geldrop railway station

== Notable residents ==
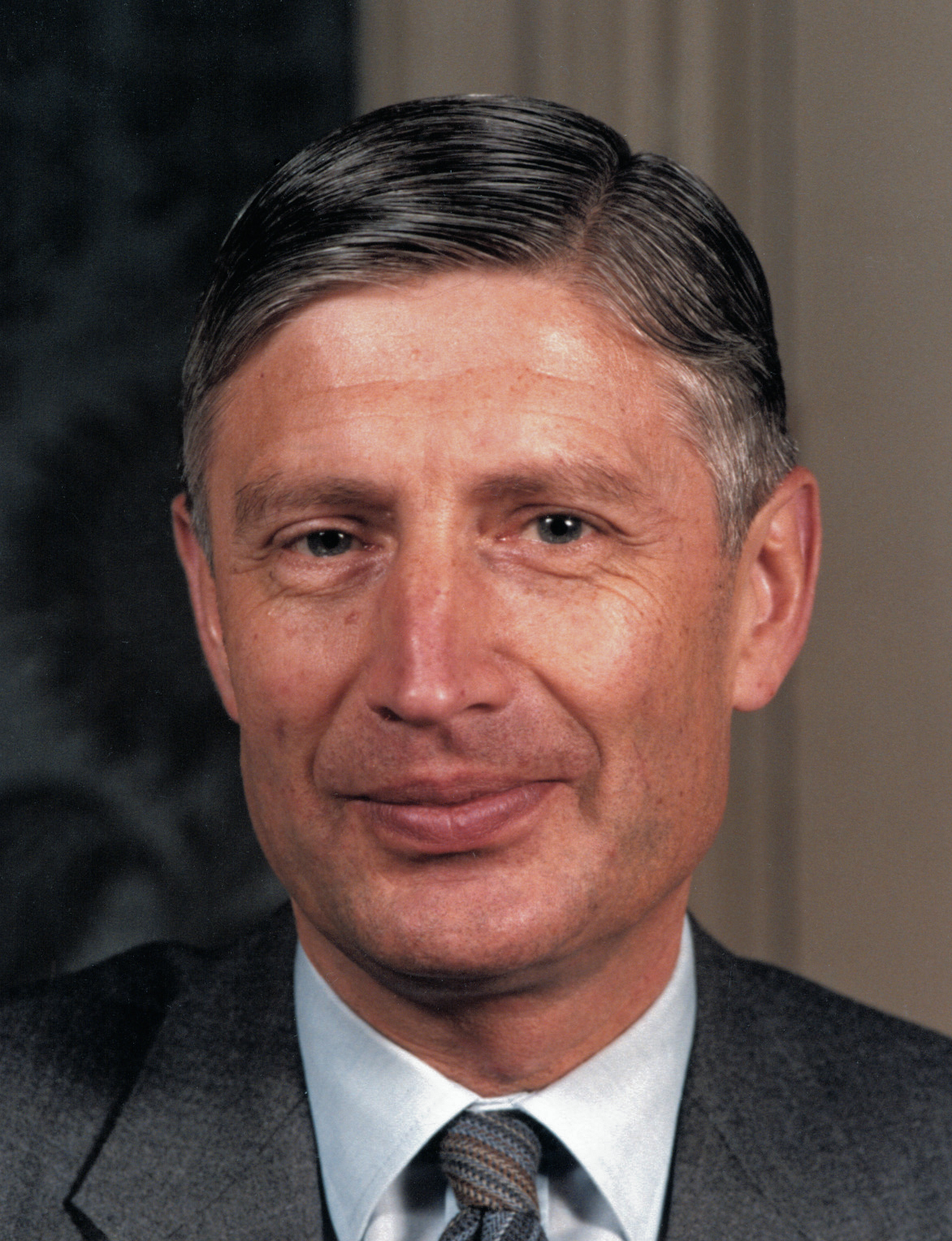
Dries van Agt, 1980

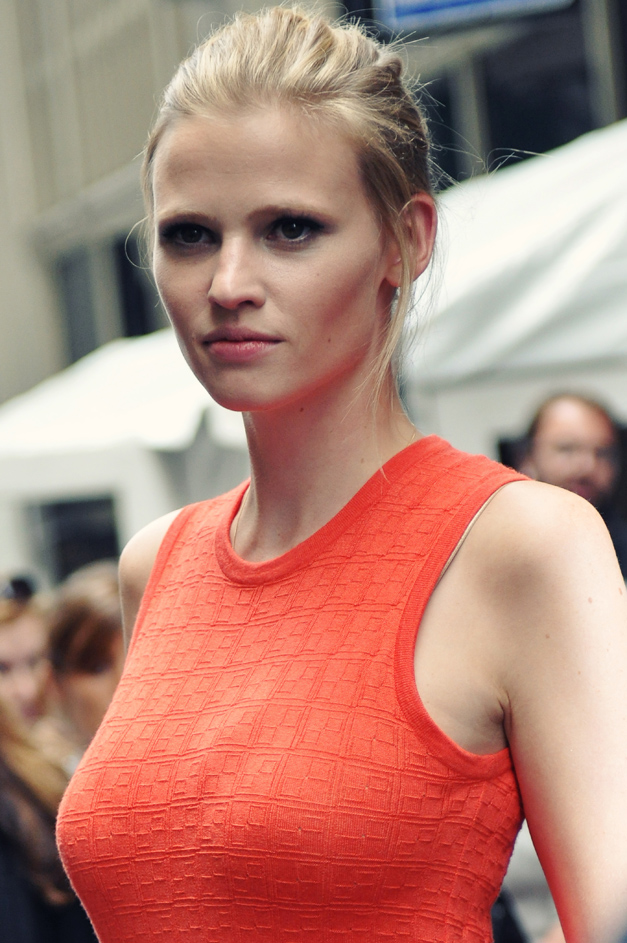
Lara Stone, 2011

- Willem van Enckevoirt (1464 in Mierlo-Hout – 1534 in Rome) a Dutch Cardinal, Bishop of Utrecht 1529 to 1534.
- Dries van Agt (born 1931 in Geldrop – 2024) former Prime Minister of the Netherlands, 1977-1982
- A.F.Th. van der Heijden (born 1951 in Geldrop) a Dutch writer
- Dr. Wijnand van der Sanden (born 1953 in Geldrop) a Dutch archaeologist and prehistorian
- Raimond Lap (born 1959 in Geldrop) a composer of music for toddlers and babies
- Rianne Donders-de Leest (born 1960) a Dutch politician, Mayor of Geldrop-Mierlo 2004-2015
- Michiel Riedijk (born 1964 in Geldrop) a Dutch architect and university professor
- Menno Westendorp (born 1969 in Geldrop) a Dutch cinematographer
- Frank Lammers (born 1972 in Mierlo) a Dutch TV and film actor
- Martijn Deijkers (born 1975 in Geldrop), stage name Martyn, a Dutch producer and DJ
- Job Roggeveen (born 1979 in Geldrop) a film director and writer
- Pieter Henket (born 1979 in Geldrop) a photographer who lives and works in New York City
- Lara Stone (born 1983 in Mierlo) a Dutch fashion model

=== Sport ===
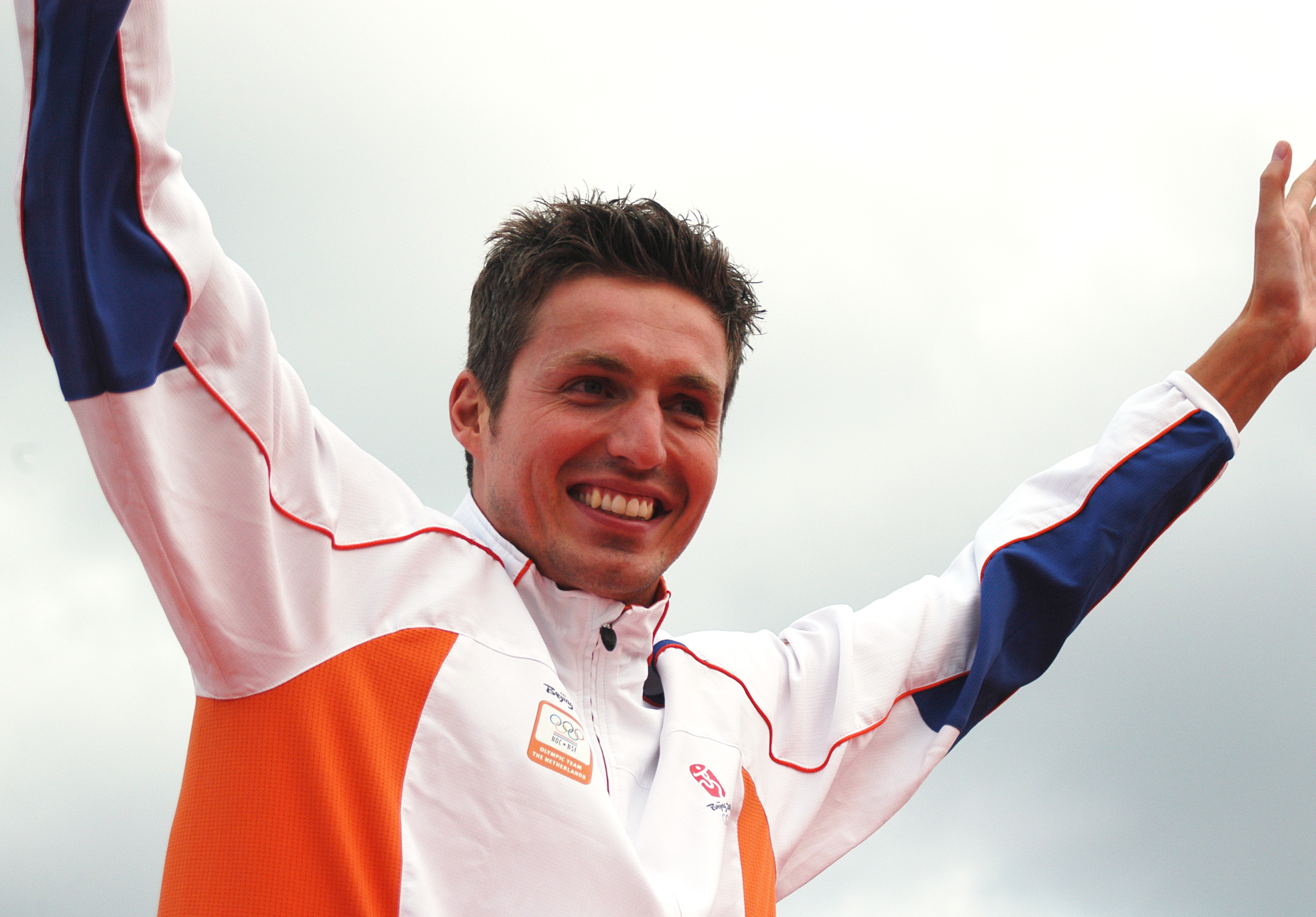
Pieter van den Hoogenband, 2008

- Ernest Faber (born 1971 in Geldrop) a football manager and former player with 248 club caps
- Dirk Lippits (born 1977 in Geldrop) a Dutch rower, silver medallist in the 2000 Summer Olympics
- Pieter van den Hoogenband (born 1978) a Dutch former swimmer, triple gold medallist at the 2000 and 2004 Summer Olympics, grew up in Geldrop
- Marcel Balkestein (born 1981 in Geldrop) a Dutch field hockey player, team silver medallist at the 2012 Summer Olympics
- Roel Koolen (born 1982 in Mierlo) a Dutch baseball player, competed at the 2008 Summer Olympics
- Mink van der Weerden (born 1988 in Geldrop) a Dutch field hockey player, team silver medallist at the 2012 Summer Olympics
- Maikel van der Vleuten (born 1988 in Geldrop) a Dutch show jumping rider, team silver medallist at the 2012 Summer Olympics
- Mitch Dielemans (born 1993 in Geldrop) a Dutch competitive archer, competed at the 2016 Summer Olympics

== Gallery ==
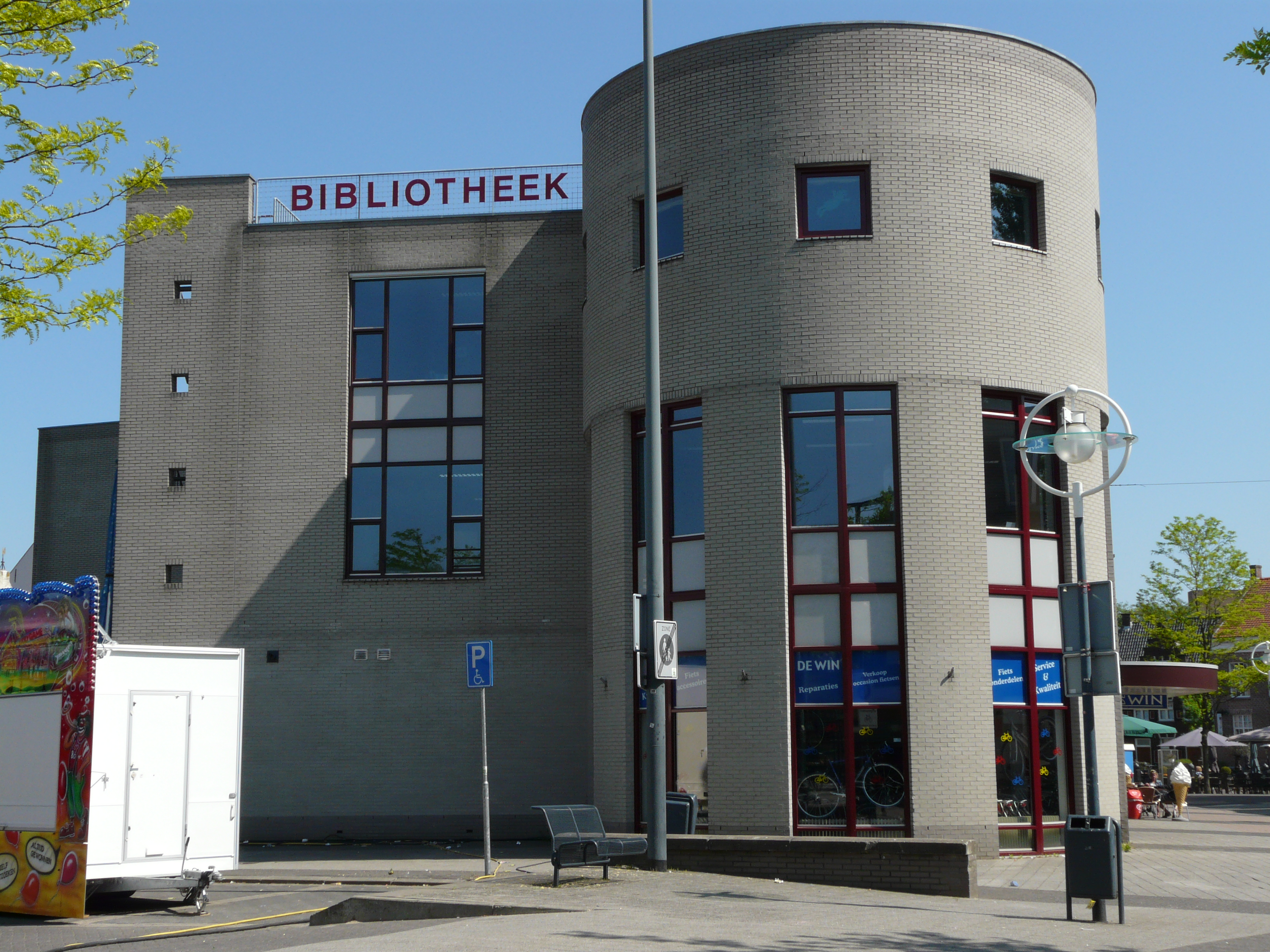
Centrum Geldrop, Library

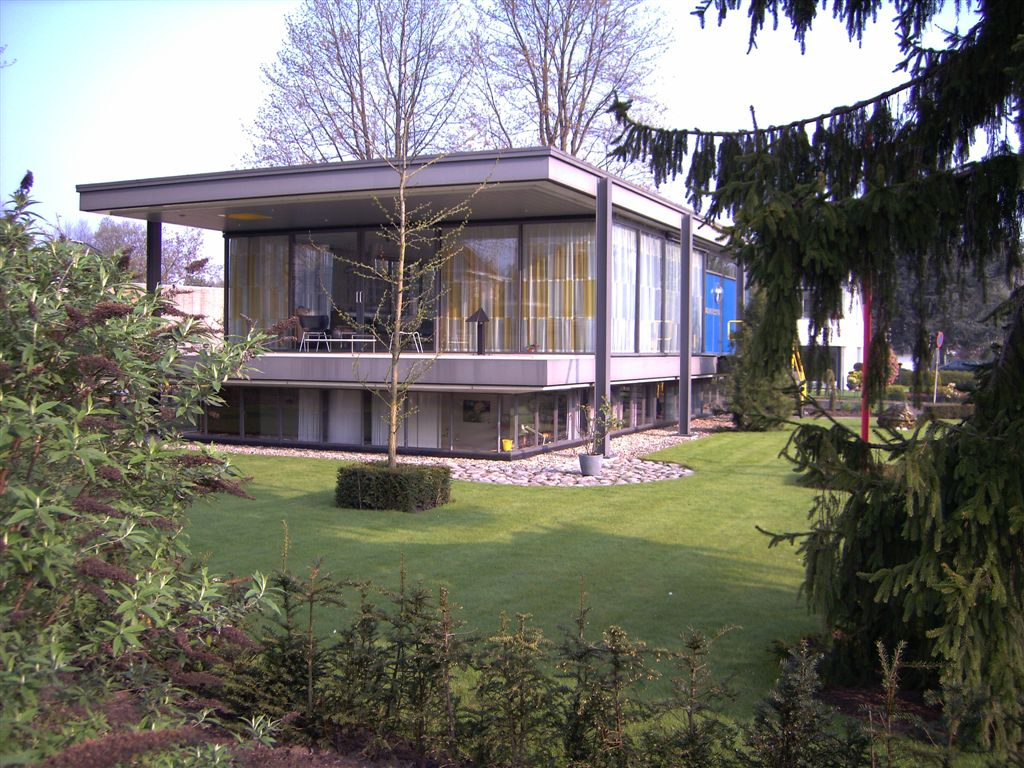
Glazen huis, Geldrop

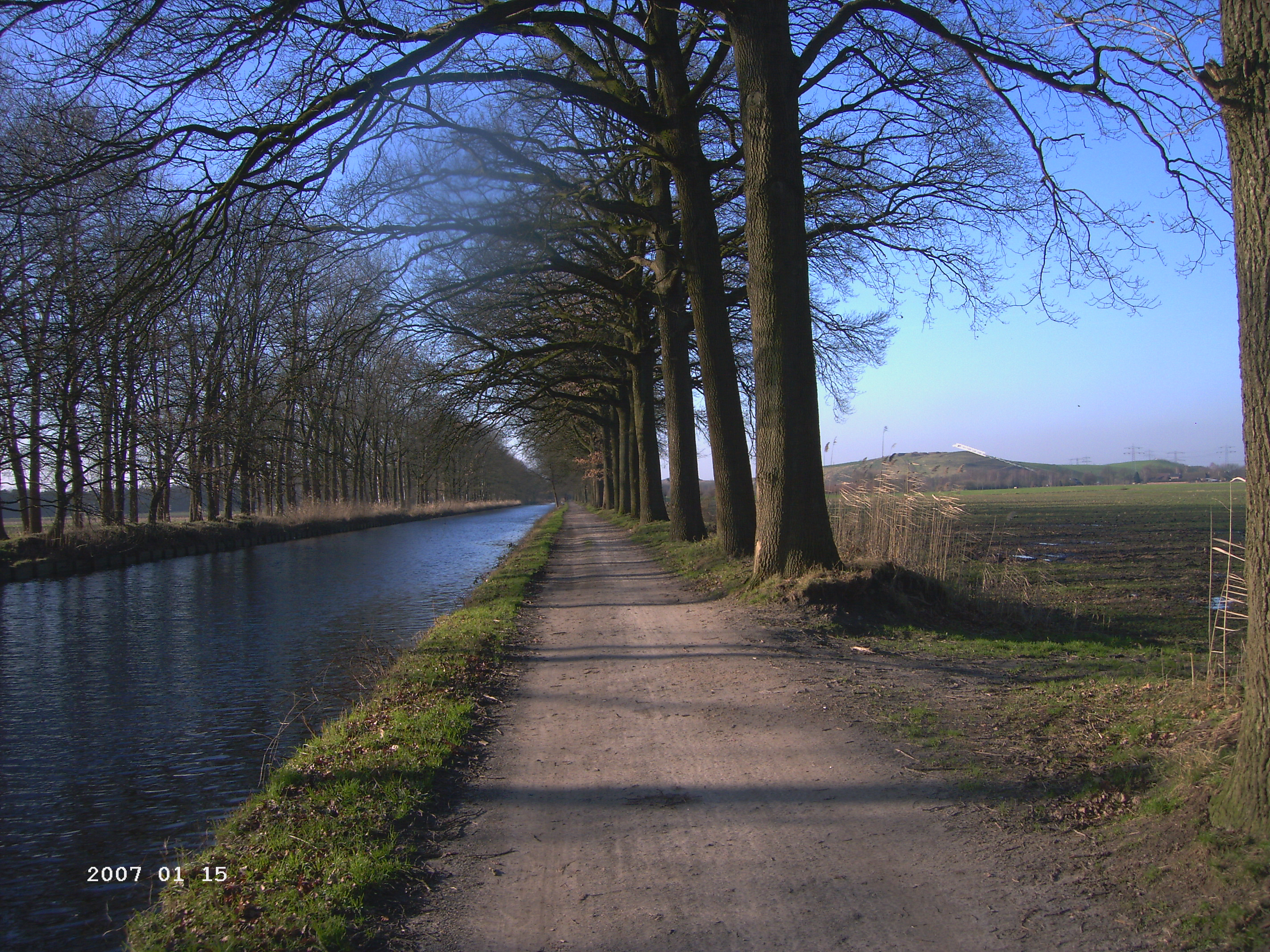
Eindhovenskanaal Gulberg Razob

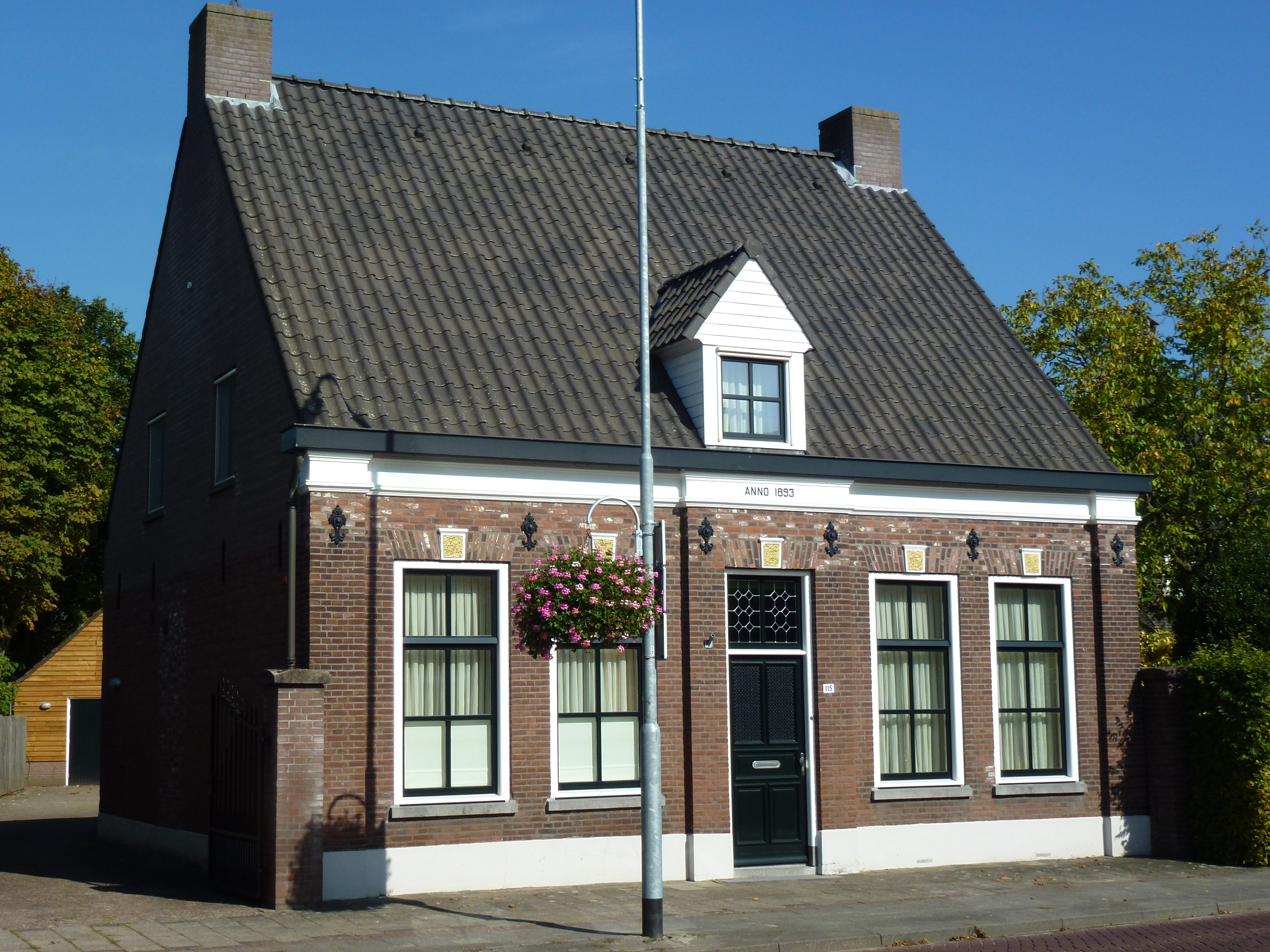
Dorpsstraat 115, Mierlo
