= Mierlo =

- Town
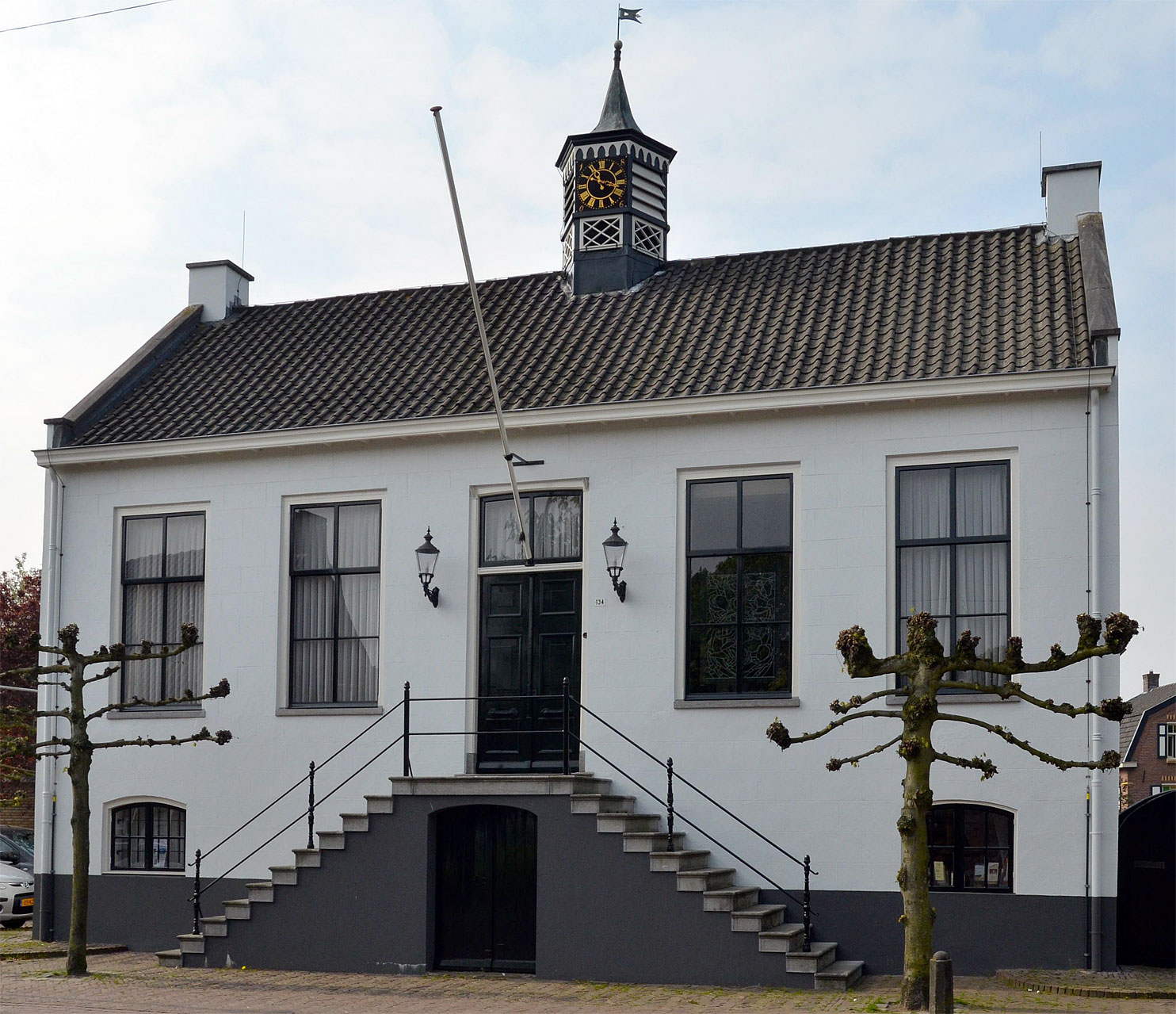
- Mierlo town hall

- Coat of arms

- Location in the province of North Brabant in the Netherlands Mierlo (Netherlands)
- Coordinates: 51°26′28″N 5°37′10″E
- Country: Netherlands
- Province: North Brabant
- Municipality: Geldrop-Mierlo

Area
  - Total: 18.03 km^{2} (6.96 sq mi)
- Elevation: 22 m (72 ft)

Population (2021)
  - Total: 11,105
  - Density: 615.9/km^{2} (1,595/sq mi)
- Time zone: UTC+1 (CET)
  - Summer (DST): UTC+2 (CEST)
- Postal code: 5731
- Dialing code: 0492

Mierlo is a village in the southern Netherlands, in the municipality of Geldrop-Mierlo, North Brabant. Until 2004, it was a separate municipality with an area of 18.09 km^{2} (7 sq mi).

Mierlo is home to a few interesting buildings, for example the old Council house and the windmill in the centre of the village. Sports clubs in Mierlo are Mifano and the Hockey Club. Just to the south, separated by the A67 motorway, lies the Strabrechtse Heide.

Mierlo is situated in the urban area of Eindhoven and Helmond. But it has many green areas. It lies on the edge of forests, moorlands and fields.

== History ==
The oldest inhabitants of the area that we have any knowledge of were the reindeer hunters. In 1961, a piece of sandstone, dated at around 9,000B.C. was discovered on the heath between Mierlo and Geldrop. On this stone a half-naked dancing female figure was etched, which is now known as the 'Venus of Mierlo.' It is the oldest artistic expression ever found in the Netherlands.

The village was first mentioned in 1245 as Henricus de Mirle, and is a combination of the words for moorland and open forest. Mierlo developed in the 12th century near a castle. The castle was rebuilt in 1210 after it was destroyed, and collapsed in a storm in 1800.

The Catholic St. Lucia Church was built between 1856 and 1858. Part of the tower of the medieval church was incorporated in the new church. The nameless grist mill of Mierlo was built around 1640. It was moved in 1860 and 1992. It was restored several times and nowadays only used occasionally.

Mierlo was home to 466 people in 1840. Mierlo was an independent municipality. In 1968, the village Mierlo-Hout was transferred to Helmond. In 2003 when it was merged into Geldrop-Mierlo.

In 2004, Mierlo acquired a zoo named 'Eindhoven Zoo' near the Gulbergen. This zoo initially began under the name 'Dierenrijk Europa,' featuring animals ranging from polar bears to apes from Gibraltar, as well as beavers that had been reintroduced in the Netherlands. When non-European animals, such as elephants and camels, were also introduced, the name was changed to 'Dierenrijk' and later 'Eindhoven Zoo'.

== Gallery ==
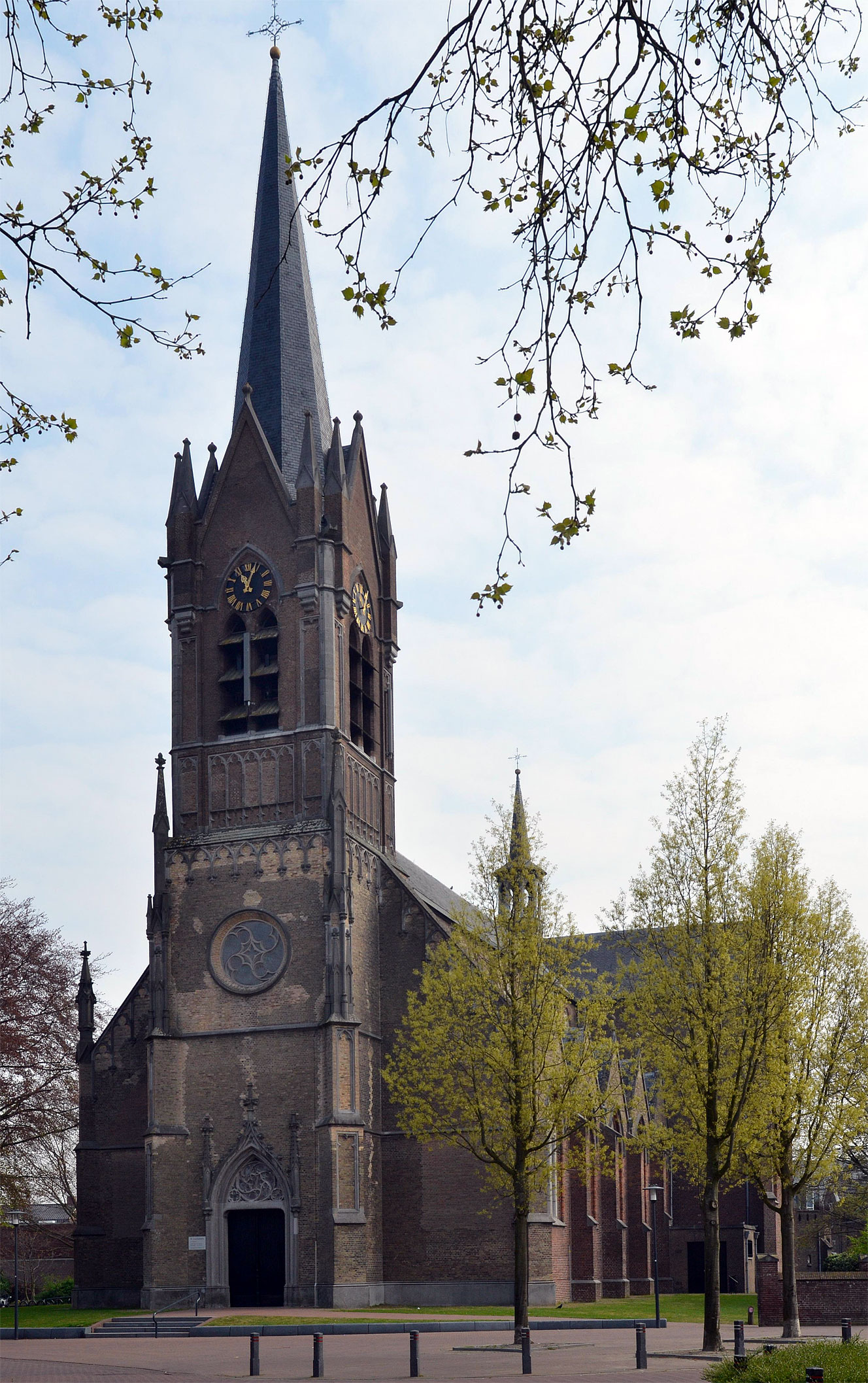
St Lucia Church

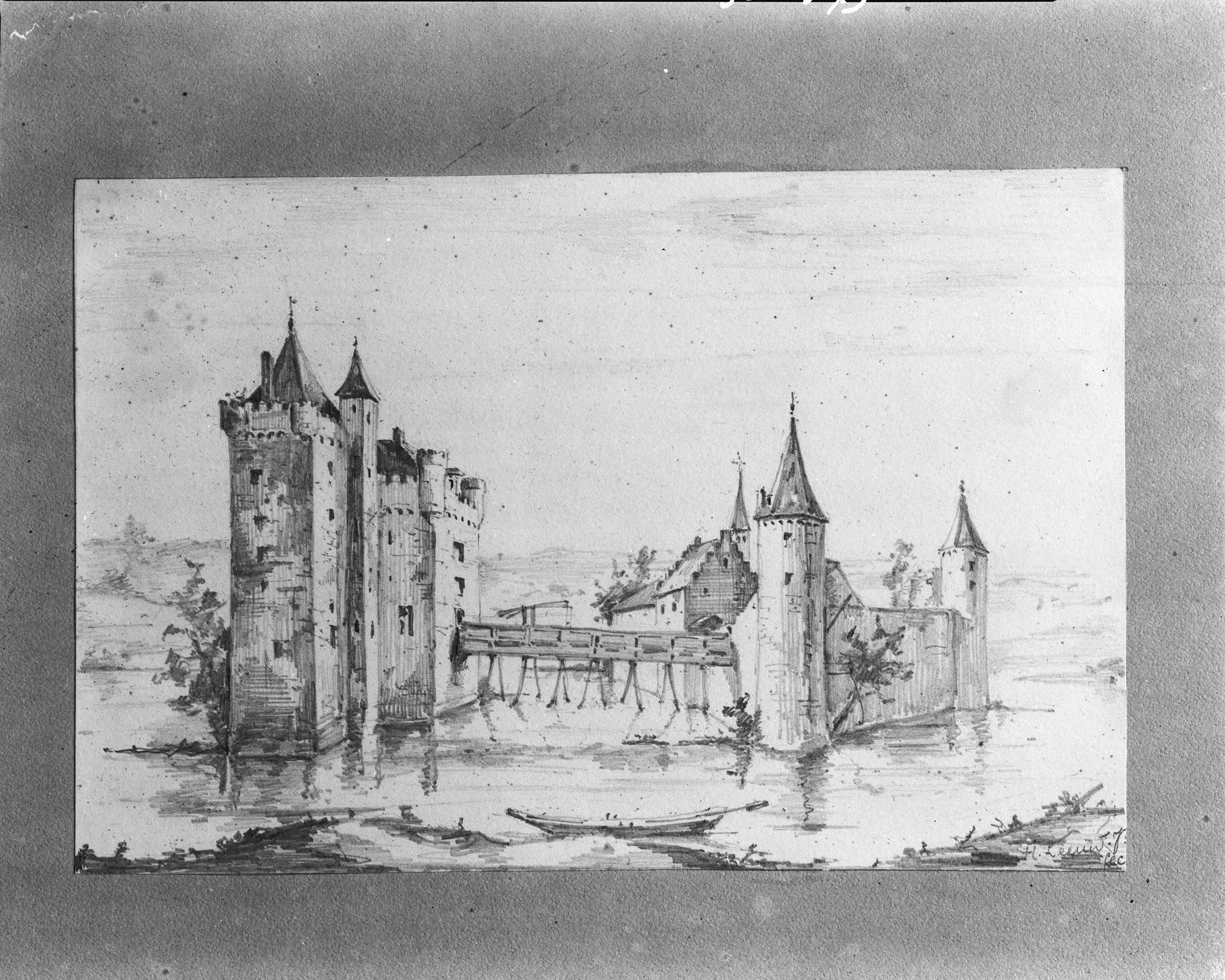
Drawing of Castle Mierlo

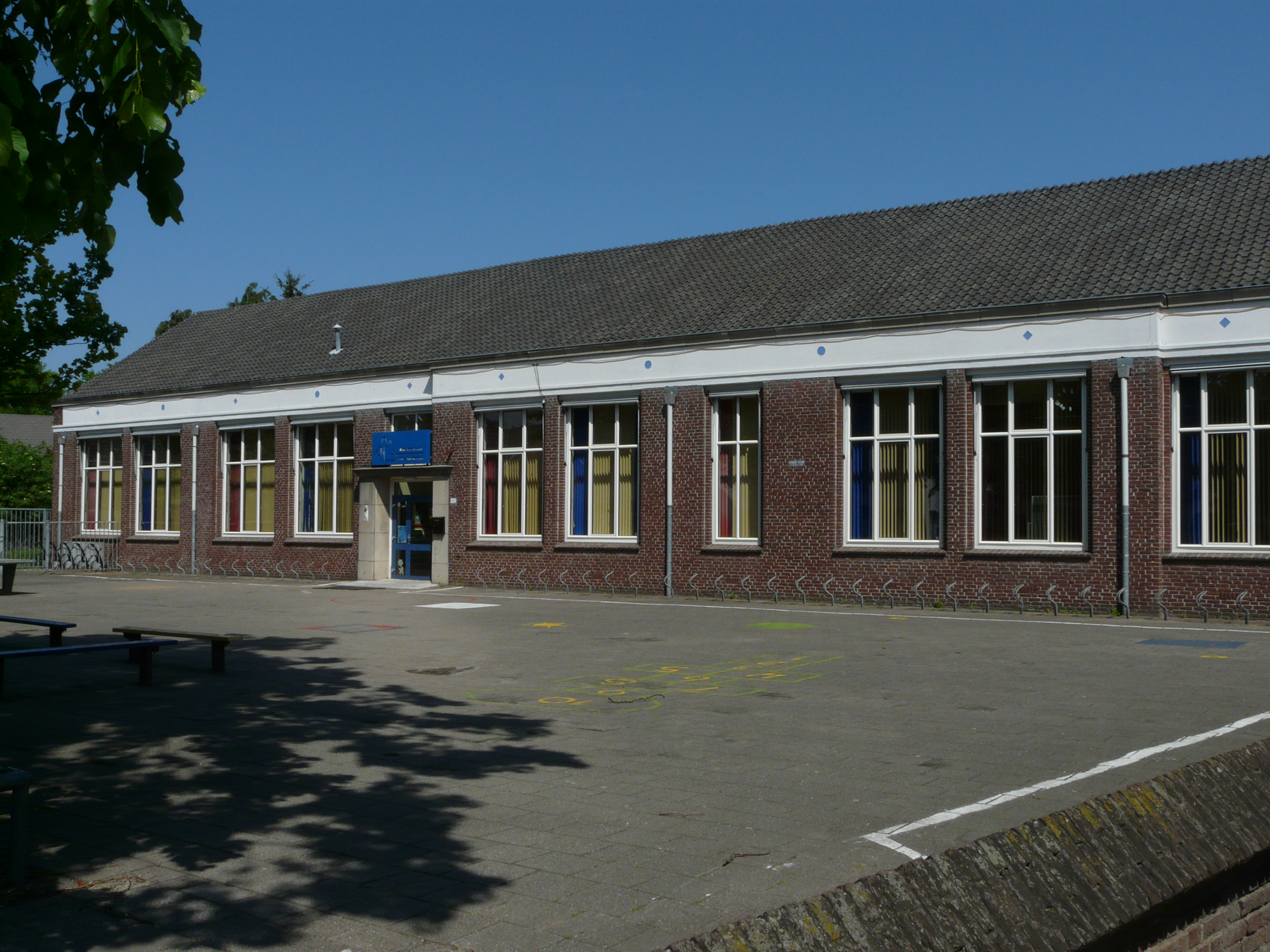
School in Mierlo

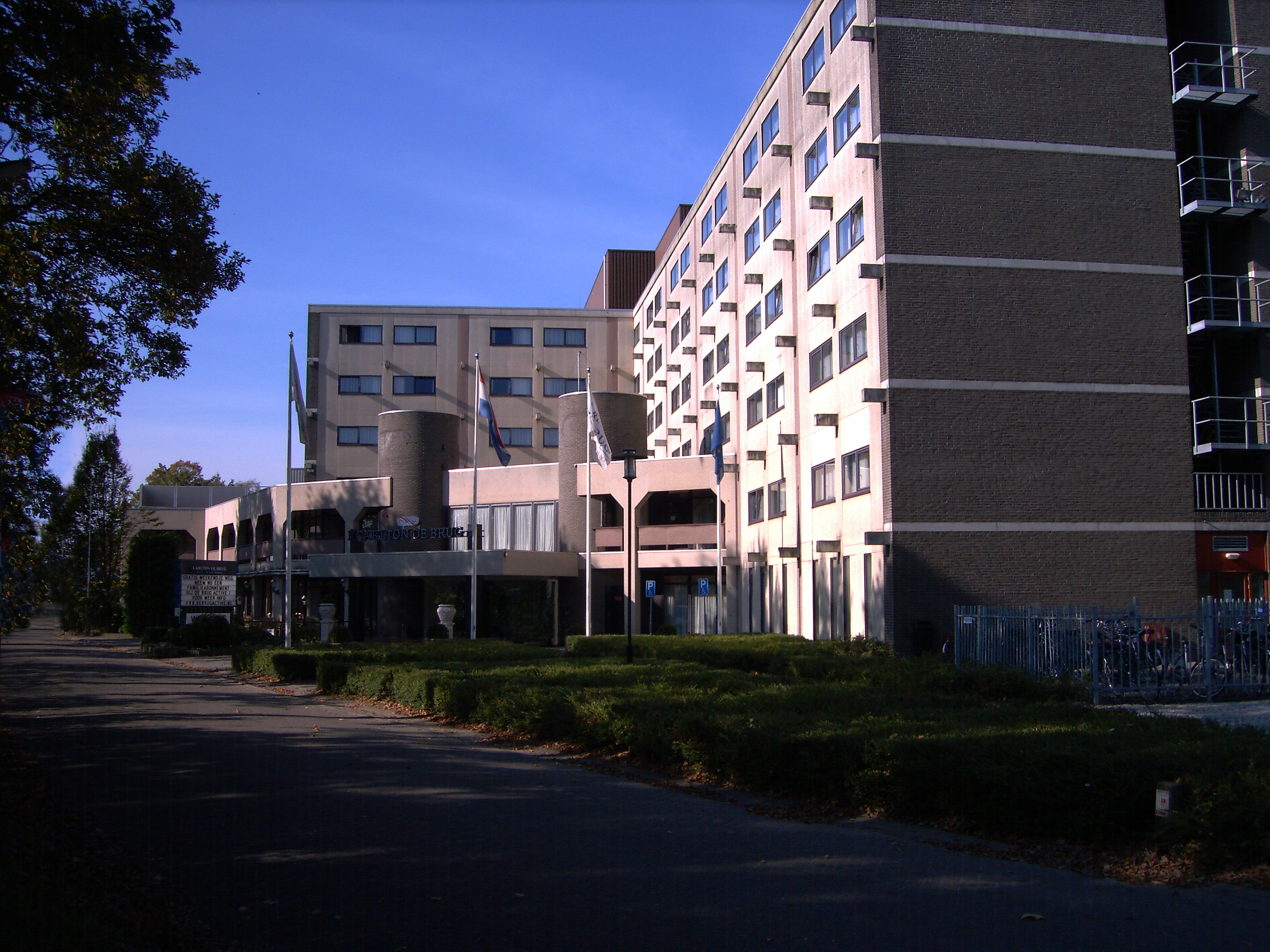
Hotel in Mierlo

== See also ==
- Geldrop-Mierlo
