= Venus of Mierlo =

Nickname of an engraving

The Venus of Mierlo is the nickname for a prehistoric engraving on stone of a young woman which was found at Geldrop-Mierlo in the North Brabant province of the Netherlands.

The name is, of course, purely modern, as the engraving predated by many millennia the Italian religion and the goddess Venus. There is no way of knowing what was the woman's name or those who made the engraving, and its exact cultural and religious significance is a matter of conjecture.
