= Weert railway station =

Railway station in the Netherlands

Weert
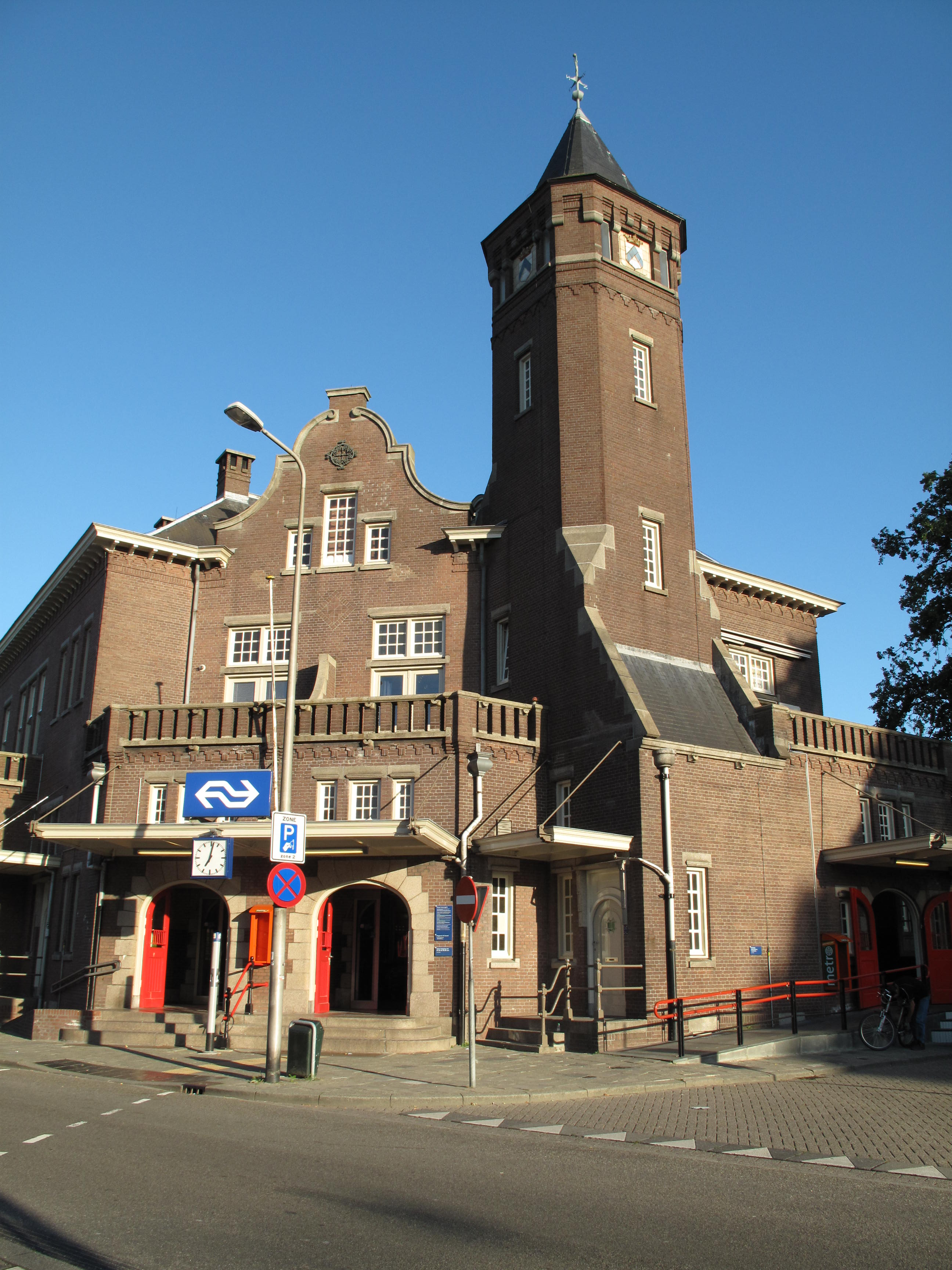

General information
- Location: Netherlands
- Coordinates: 51°14′55″N 5°42′09″E
- Lines: Eindhoven–Weert railway Weert–Roermond railway Iron Rhine

History
- Opened: 1879

Services
Preceding station	Nederlandse Spoorwegen	Following station
Eindhoven Centraal towards Alkmaar	NS Intercity 2700 Mon-Thur until 19:00	Roermond towards Maastricht
Eindhoven Centraal towards Enkhuizen	NS Intercity 2900 After 19:00 and Fri-Sun only	Roermond towards Maastricht
Eindhoven Centraal towards Enkhuizen	NS Intercity 3900 Mon-Thur until 19:30	Roermond towards Heerlen
Eindhoven Centraal Terminus	NS Intercity 3900 After 19:30 and Fri-Sun	Roermond towards Heerlen
Maarheeze towards Tilburg Universiteit	NS Sprinter 6400	Terminus
Preceding station	Arriva Netherlands	Following station
Eindhoven Centraal towards Schiphol Airport	Nachttrein 32710 Friday night only	Roermond towards Maastricht
Location
- Location within Netherlands

Weert is a railway station in Weert, Netherlands. The station is on the Eindhoven–Weert railway, Weert–Roermond railway and the Iron Rhine (Antwerp - Mönchengladbach). It was opened in 1879, the current building was built in 1913 and was declared national monument. The train services are operated by Nederlandse Spoorwegen.

== Train services ==
The following services call at Weert:

- 2x per hour intercity services (Schagen -) Alkmaar - Amsterdam - Utrecht - Eindhoven - Maastricht
- 2x per hour intercity services Amsterdam Airport Schiphol - Utrecht - Eindhoven - Heerlen
- 2x per hour local services (sprinter) Eindhoven - Weert
