= Eindhoven–Weert railway =

Railway line in the Netherlands

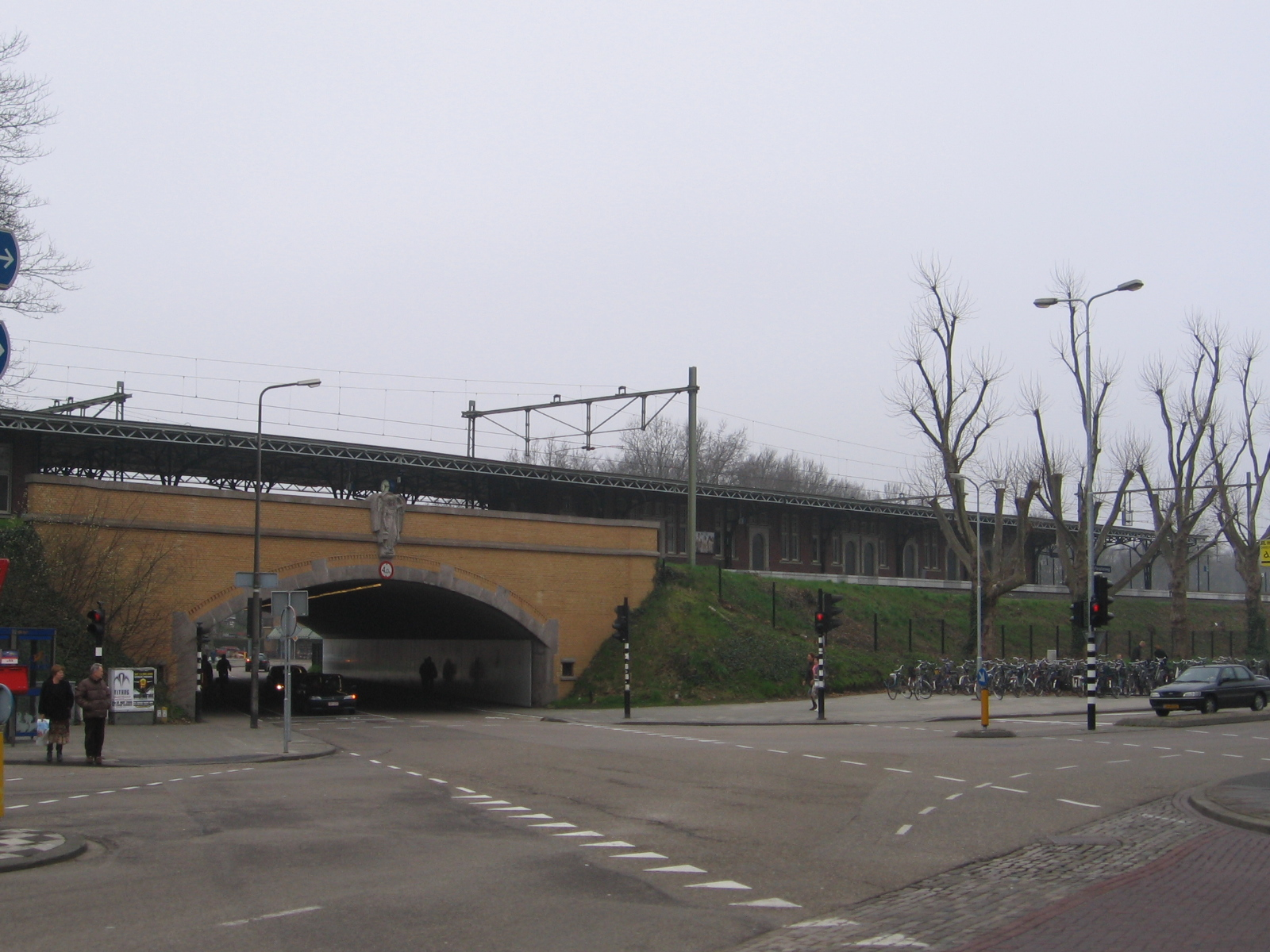
- Weert station

Overview
- Status: Operational
- Locale: The Netherlands
- Termini: Eindhoven railway station; Weert railway station

Service
- Operator(s): Nederlandse Spoorwegen

History
- Opened: 1913

Technical
- Line length: 30 km (19 mi)
- Number of tracks: double track
- Track gauge: 1,435 mm (4 ft 8 1/2 in) standard gauge
- Electrification: 1.5 kV DC

The Eindhoven–Weert railway is a railway line in the Netherlands running from Eindhoven to Weert. The line was opened in 1913. It is an important link between the cities in the western and northern part of the Netherlands, and the Limburgish cities of Maastricht and Heerlen.

== Stations ==
The main interchange stations on the Eindhoven–Weert railway are:

- Eindhoven: to Breda and Utrecht
- Weert: to Roermond, Heerlen and Maastricht
