= Deventer =

City and municipality in Overijssel, Netherlands

Deventer Daeventer (Sallands)
- City and municipality
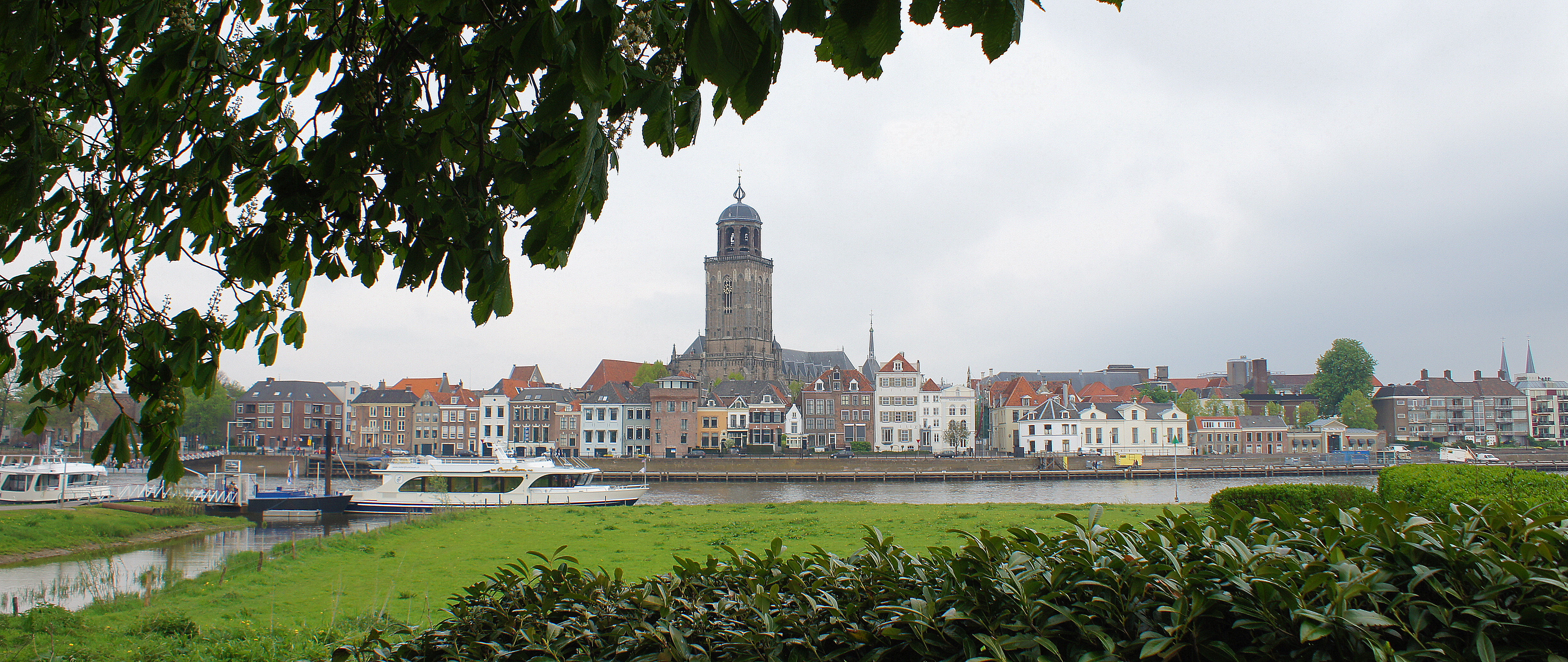
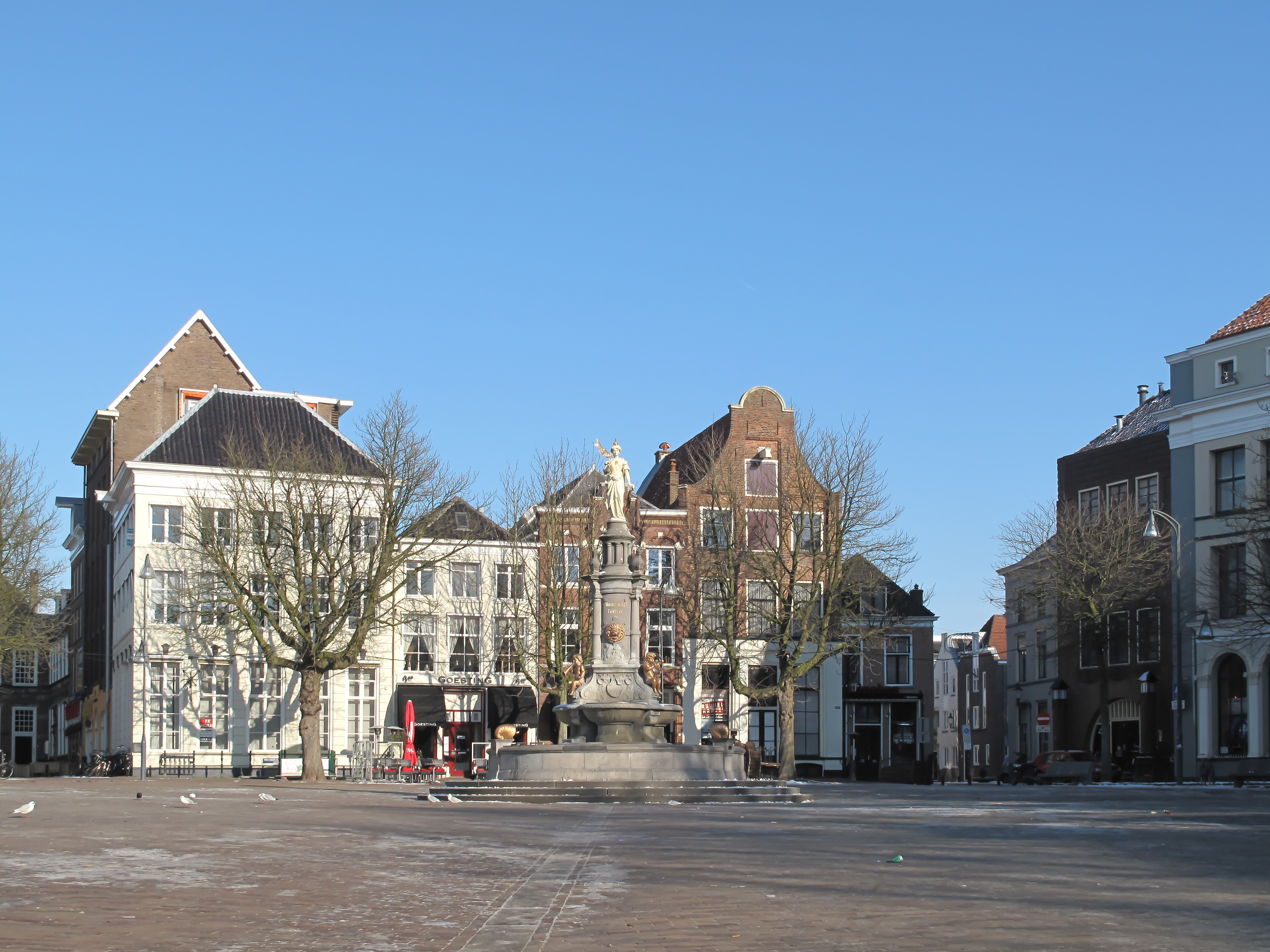
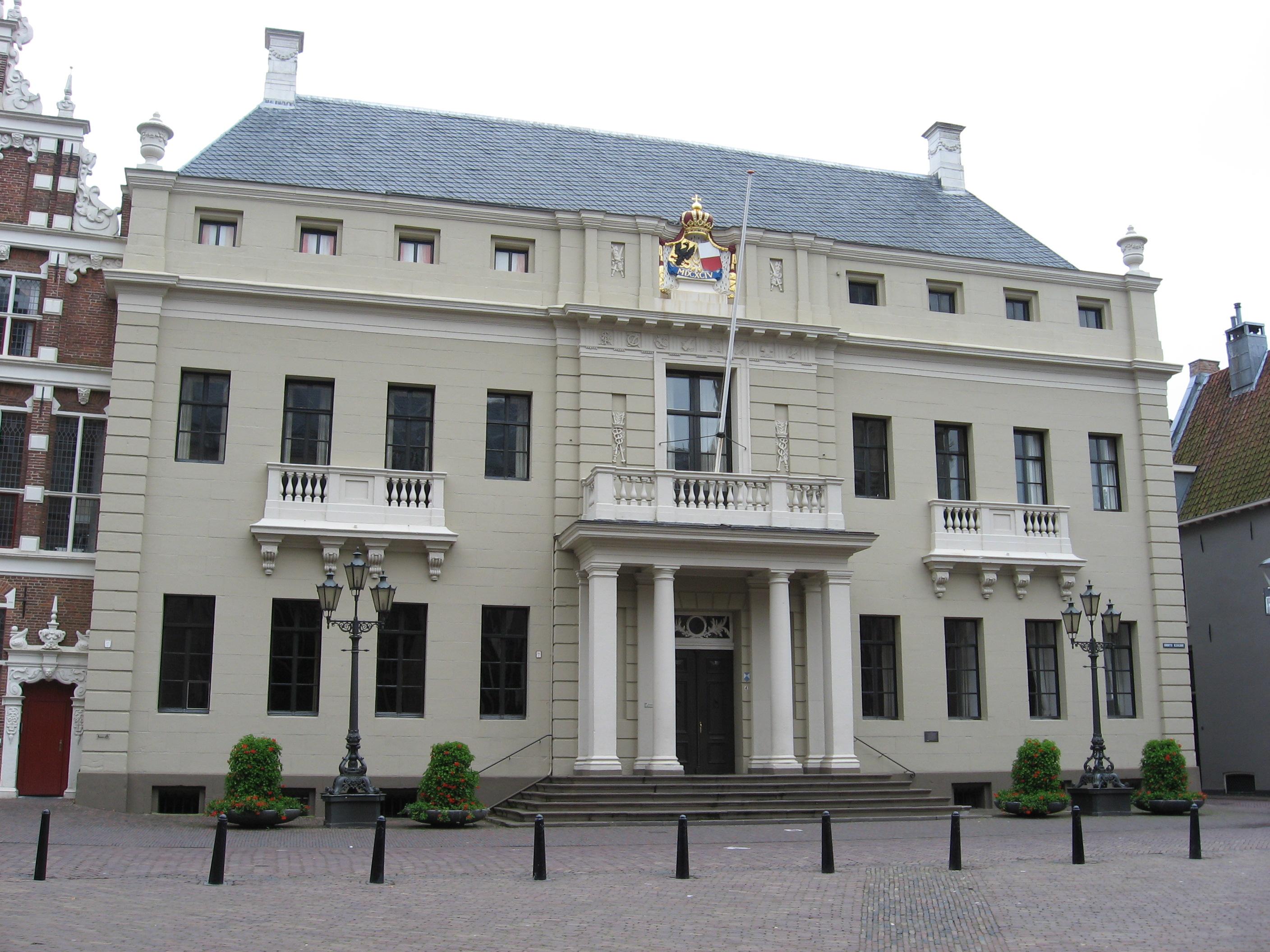
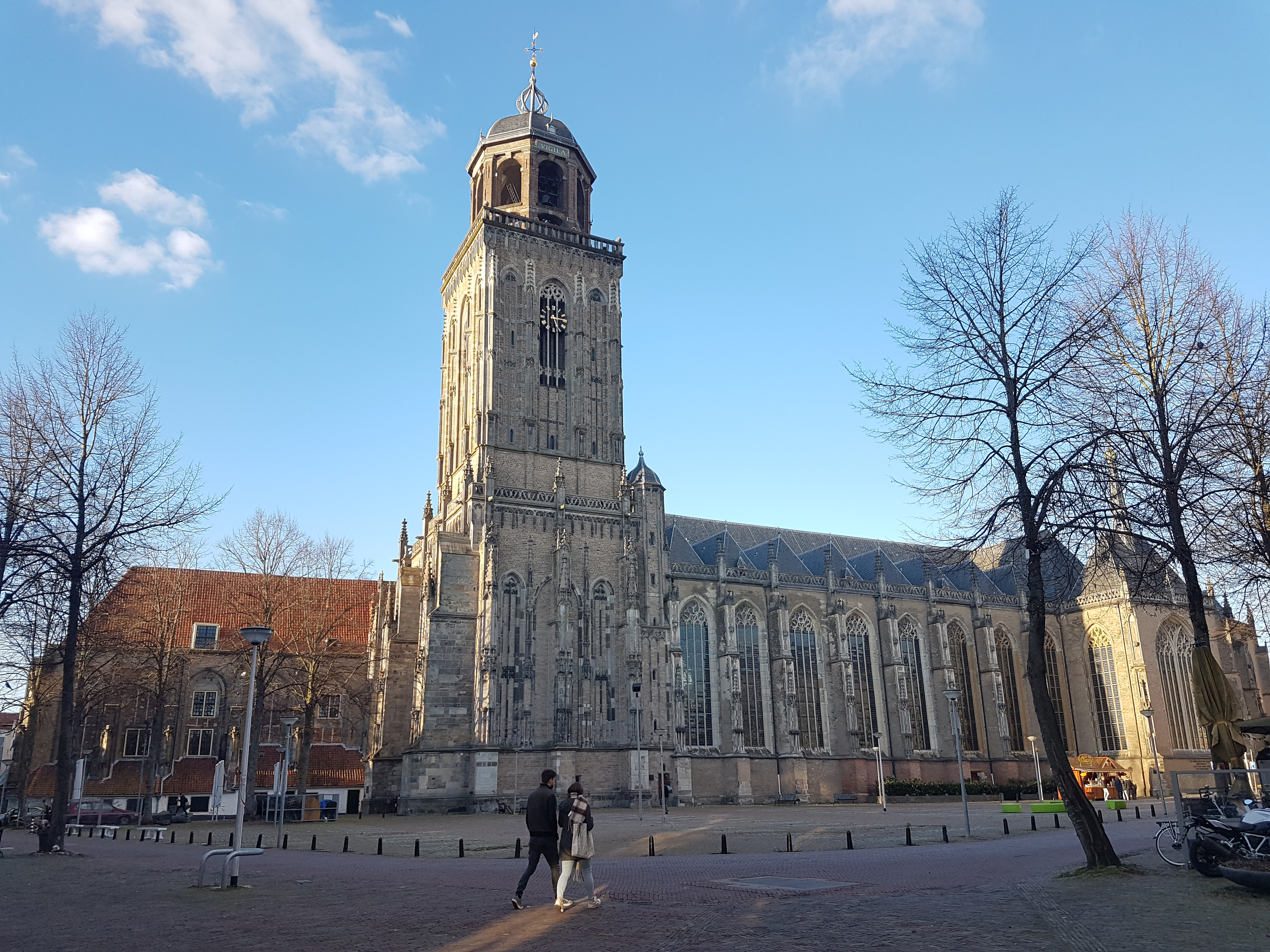
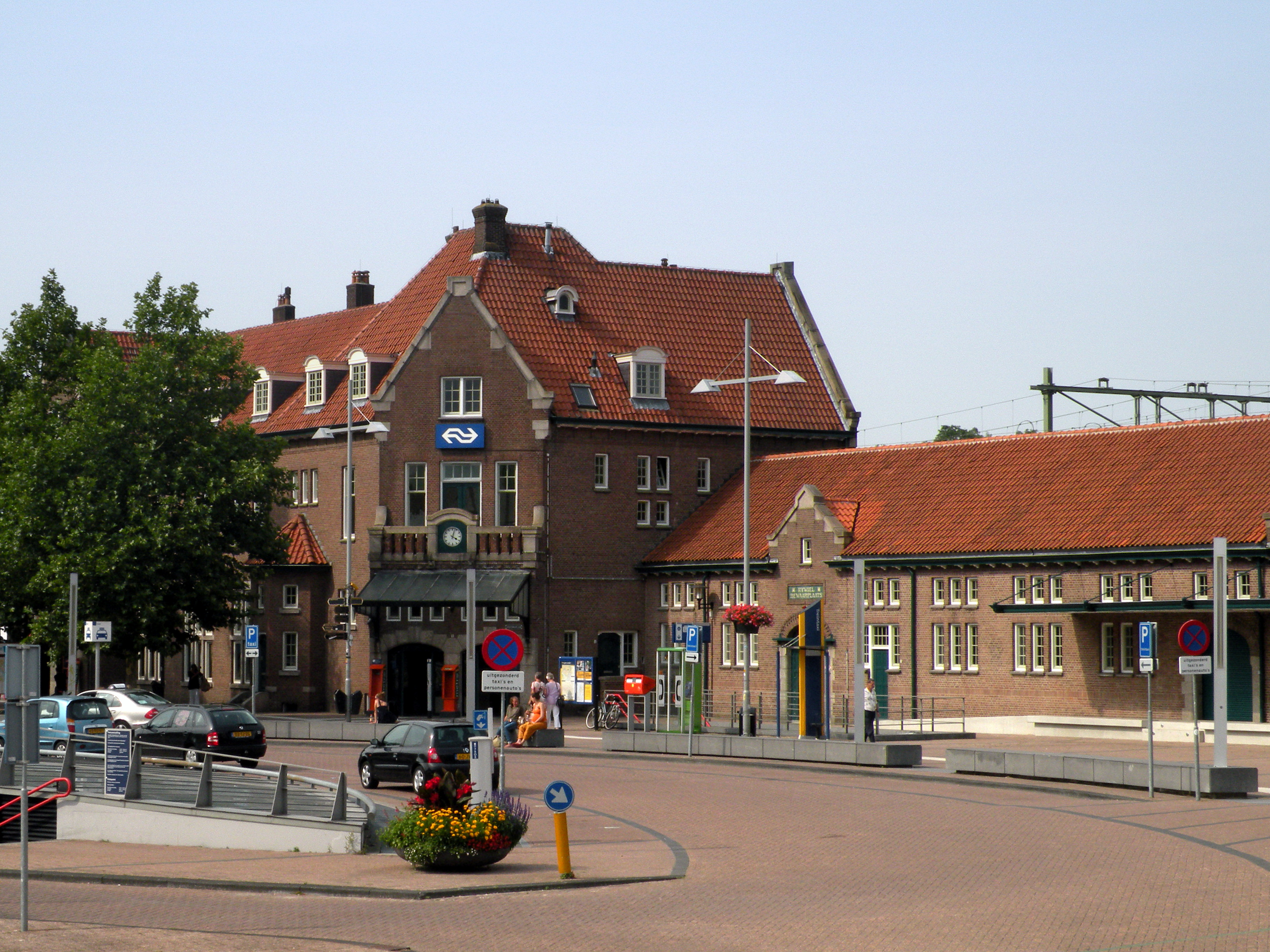
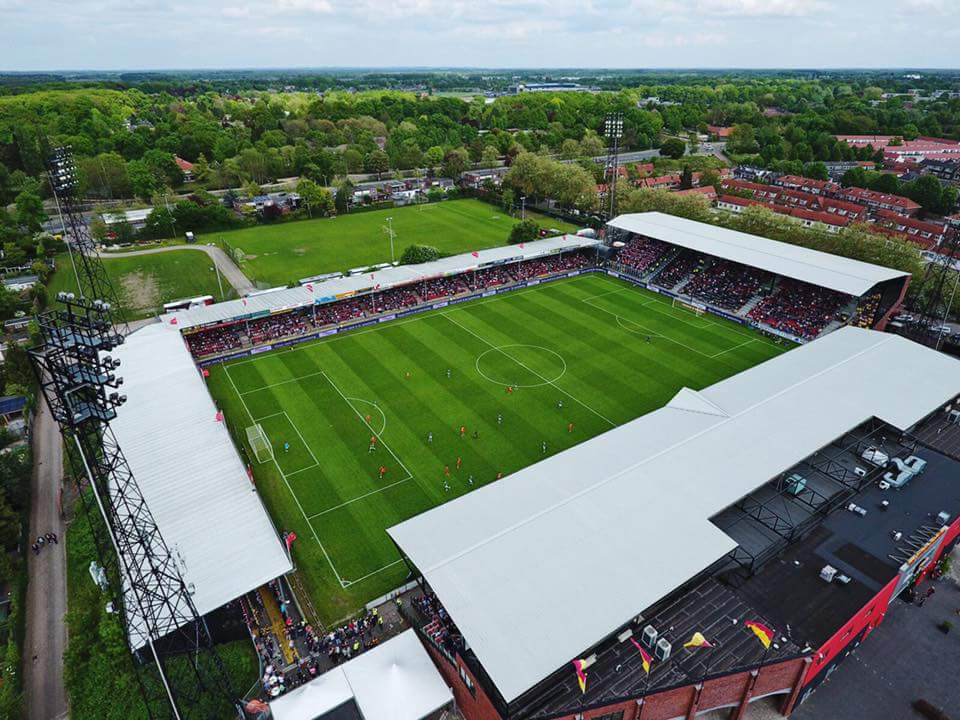
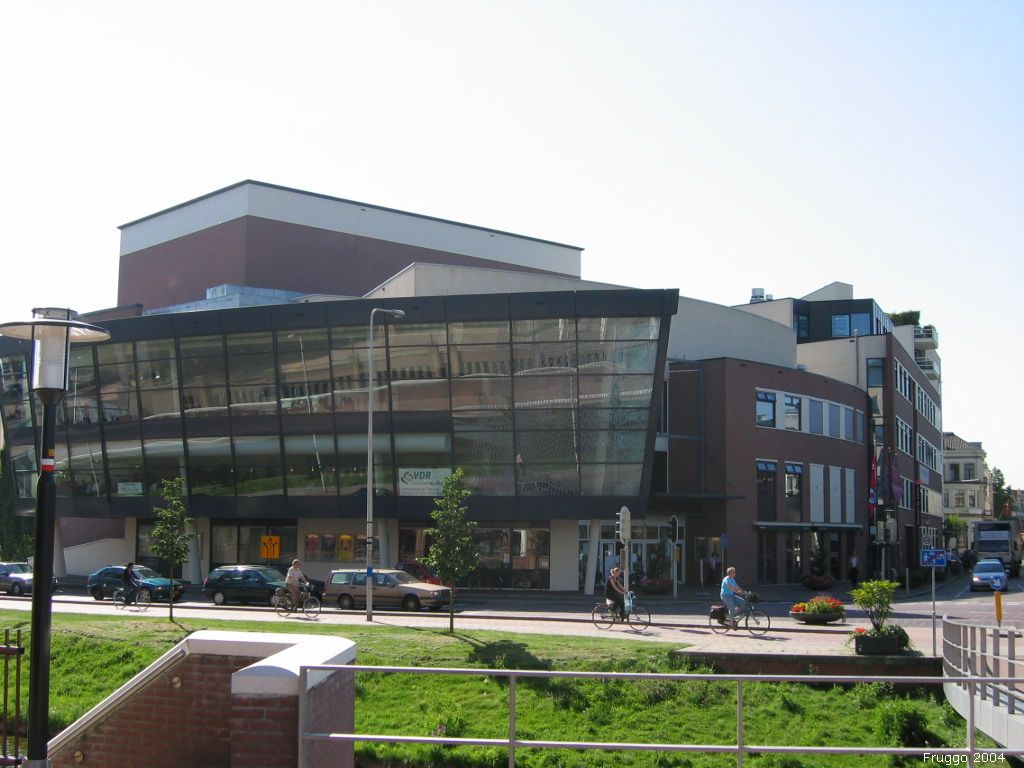
- Skyline of Deventer De Brink Square Deventer City Hall St. Lebuinus Church Deventer railway station De Adelaarshorst stadium Deventer Theatre

- Flag Coat of arms

- Location in Overijssel

- Location within the Netherlands Location within Europe
- Coordinates: 52°15′N 6°9′E
- Country: Netherlands
- Province: Overijssel

Government
  - Body: Municipal council
  - Mayor: Ron König (D66)

Area
  - Total: 134.33 km^{2} (51.87 sq mi)
  - Land: 130.68 km^{2} (50.46 sq mi)
  - Water: 3.65 km^{2} (1.41 sq mi)
- Elevation: 9 m (30 ft)

Population (January 2021)
  - Total: 101,236
  - Density: 775/km^{2} (2,010/sq mi)
- Demonym: Deventernaren
- Time zone: UTC+1 (CET)
  - Summer (DST): UTC+2 (CEST)
- Postcode: 7400–7438
- Area code: 0570
- Website: www.deventer.nl

Deventer (Dutch: [ˈdeːvəntər]; Sallands: Daeventer) is a city and municipality in the Salland historical region of the province of Overijssel, Netherlands. In 2026 the municipality of Deventer had a population of 105,111. The city is largely situated on the east bank of the river IJssel, but it also has a small part of its territory on the west bank. In 2005 the municipality of Bathmen (with a population of about 5,000 people) was merged with Deventer as part of a national effort to reduce bureaucracy in the country.

Deventer is one of the oldest cities in the Netherlands. The place is mentioned in 9th-century sources from the Diocese of Utrecht. A charter from 877 AD mentions seven farmsteads in Daventre portu (the Deventer harbour). In 952 AD, Deventer is mentioned as a city in a gift certificate from King Otto I. After the place had acquired more and more rights and privileges over time, it received the municipal lands from Emperor Henry V in 1123. This is considered by historians to be the moment of Deventer obtaining the city rights by the inhabitants. The city has the oldest stone house, the oldest walking park and with the Athenaeum library also the oldest scientific library in the Netherlands.

== History ==
=== Foundation and development in the Middle Ages ===
Deventer was probably founded around 768 AD by the English missionary Lebuinus, who built a wooden church on the east bank of the river IJssel. In January 772 AD the sack and burning of this church by a Saxon expedition was the cause for the first punitive war waged by Charlemagne to the Saxons, in which, in retribution, the Irminsul (the Saxon sacred tree, probably near modern Paderborn) was destroyed. This was not the first human settlement at the location; between 1981 and 2006, remains of a late Roman Iron Age settlement (dated to c.300 AD) were excavated at Colmschate, 4 km east of the current city.

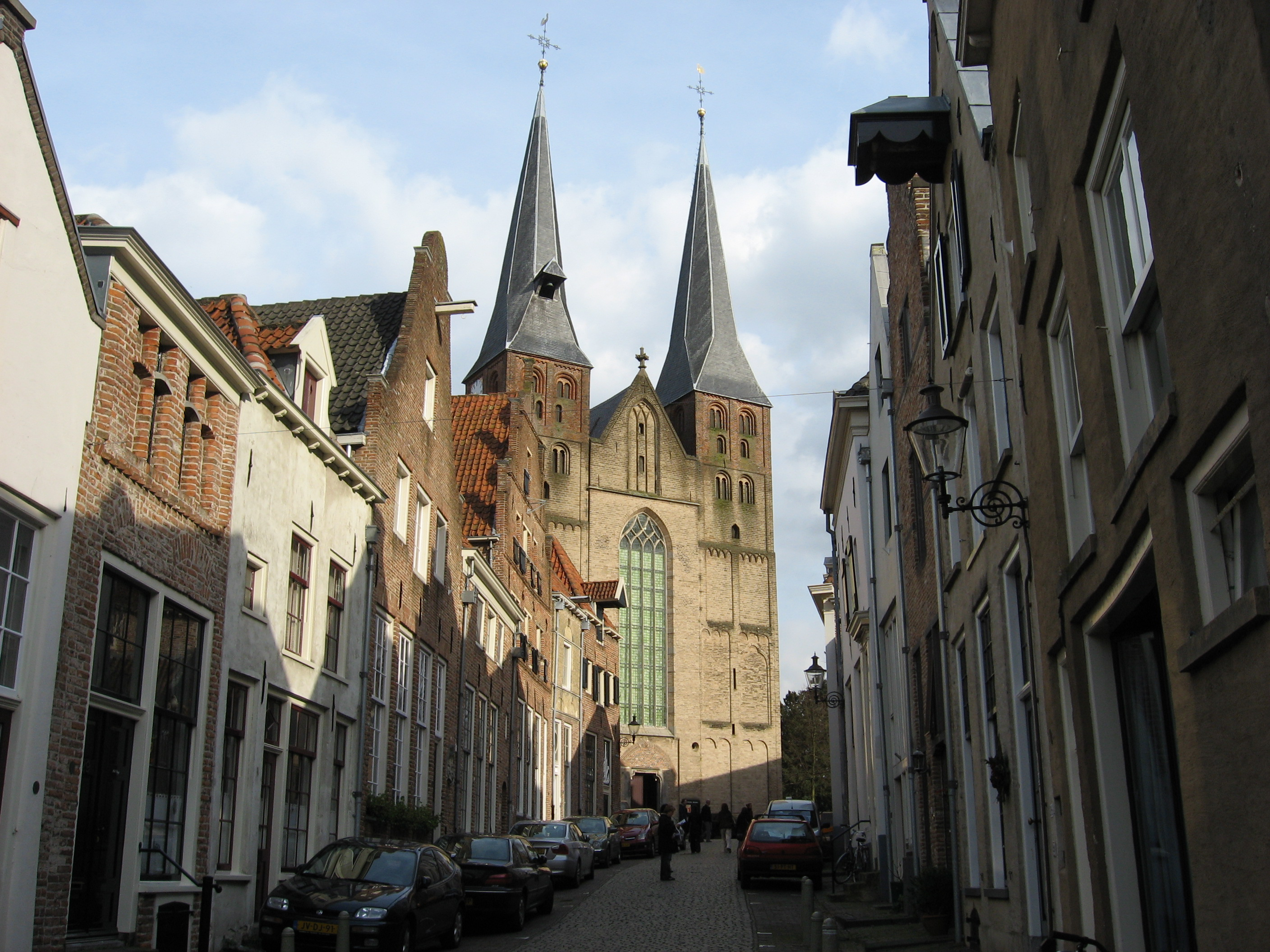
The towers of the St. Nicholas Church, now deconsecrated, date back to circa 1200

The village of Deventer, already important because of a trading road crossing the river IJssel, was looted and burnt down by the Vikings in 882. It was immediately rebuilt and fortified with an earthen wall (in the street Stenen Wal remains of this wall have been excavated and restored).

Deventer received city rights in 956, after which fortifications were built or replaced by stone walls around the city for defense. Between 1000 and 1500, Deventer grew to be a flourishing trade city because of its harbour on the river IJssel, which was capable of accommodating large ships. The city eventually joined the Hanseatic League.

One of the commodities it traded in, dried haddock and cod from Norway, gave the citizens the nickname they carry to this day: "Deventer Stokvis". In the 15th century, Deventer had a common mint, where coins for the three IJssel cities Deventer, Zwolle, and Kampen were made.

Deventer is the birthplace of Geert Groote and home to his Brethren of the Common Life, a school of religious thought that influenced Thomas à Kempis and Erasmus in later times. Together with Haarlem it was among the first cities to have printing presses, dating back to as early as 1477. From around 1300, it also housed a Latin School, which became internationally renowned, and remained in service in changing forms until 1971. Its most well-known student was the scholar Desiderius Erasmus, who was born in 1466 and attended the school from 1475 to 1484.

=== 16th–18th centuries ===
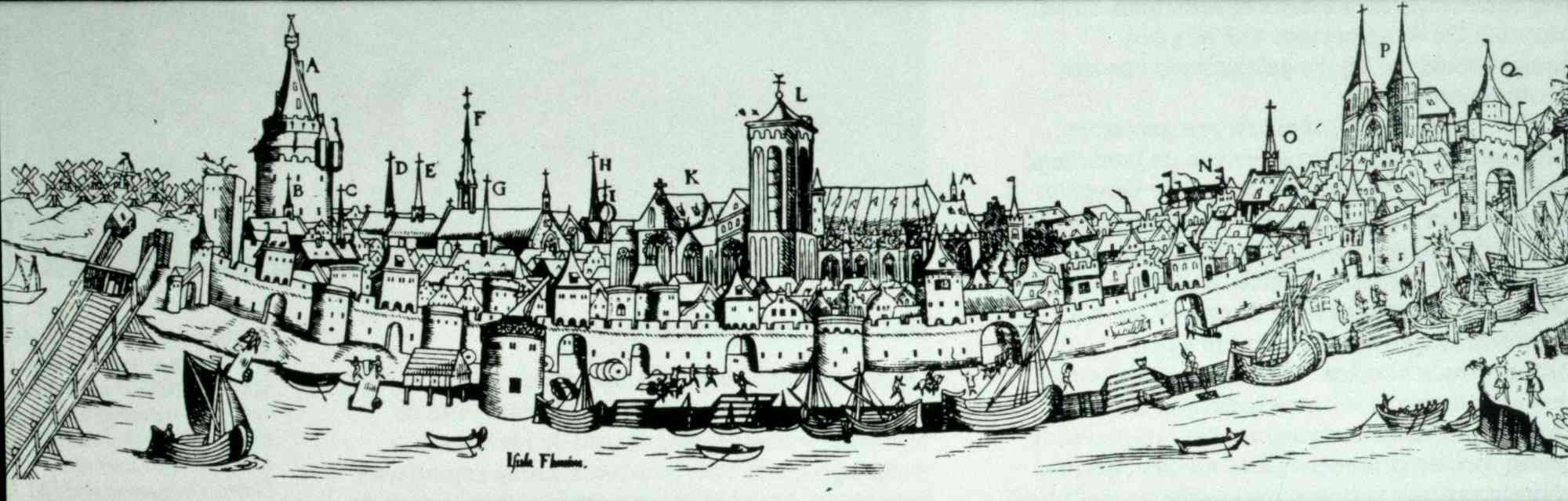
Deventer in circa 1550

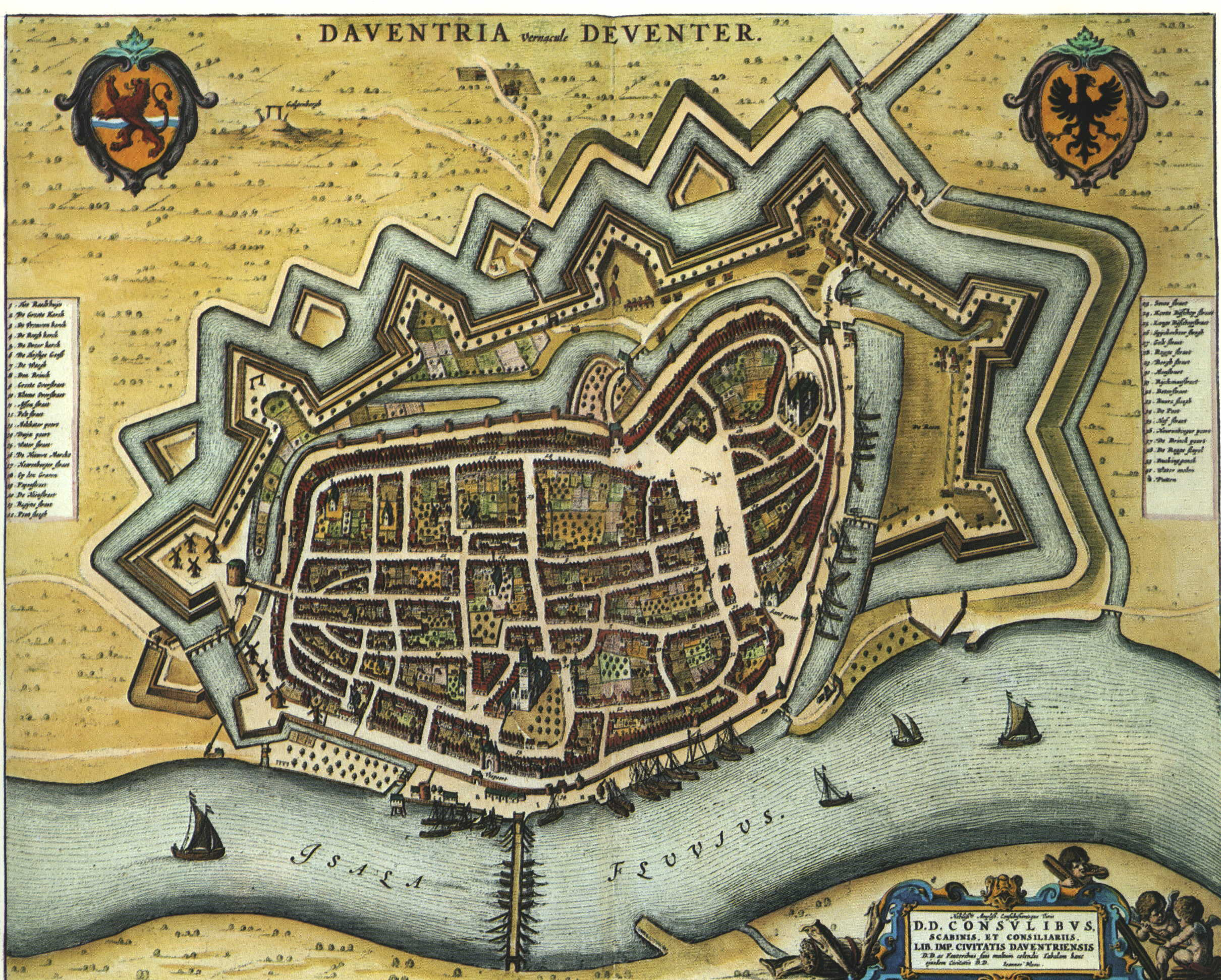
1652 map of Deventer by Willem and Joan Blaeu

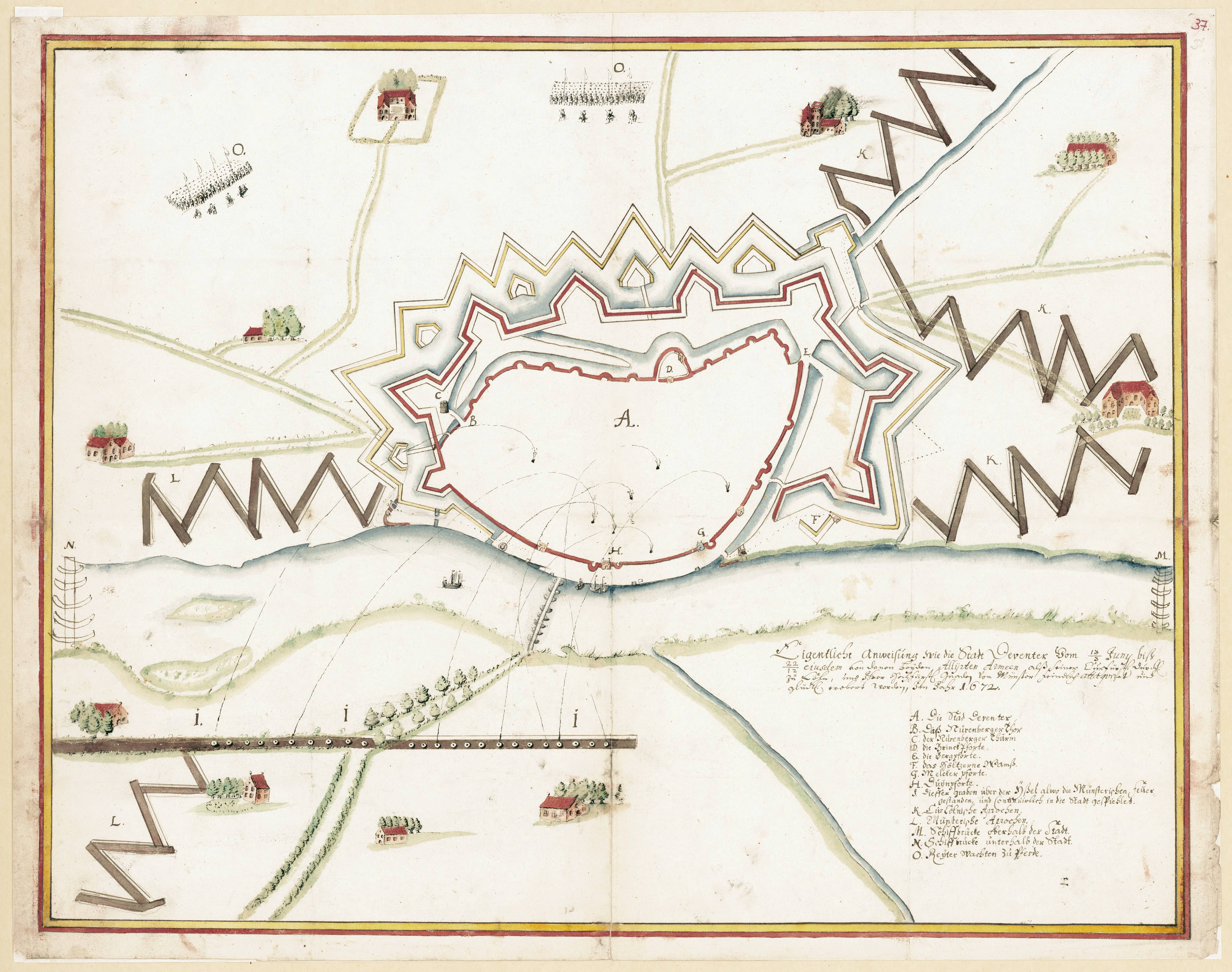
Map of Deventer at the conquest 1672

Between 1500 and 1800, the volume of water flowing through the IJssel decreased, decreasing the importance of Deventer's harbour. The competition with trade centres in Holland, as well as the religious war between 1568 and 1648, brought a decline in the city's economy.

In the 18th century, the iron industry came to Deventer. East of the town, so-called "oer", river sand containing iron, was found as early as 900. From this material, ore was produced and brought to town. The main road of the villages Okkenbroek, Lettele and Schalkhaar is still named Oerdijk (Ore Dyke).

=== Modern times ===
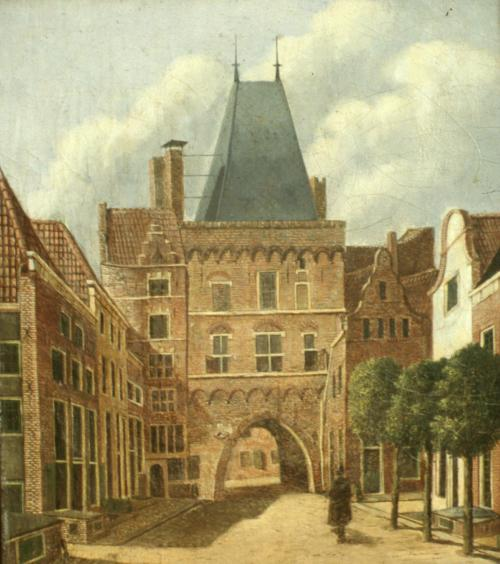
The former Binnen-Vispoort in the 19th century.

In the 19th century, Deventer became an industrial town. Bicycles (Burgers), carpets (Koninklijke Deventer Tapijtfabriek), tins and cans for food and drinks (Thomassen & Drijver), cigars (Horst & Maas en Bijdendijk & Ten Hove), foundry and heavy machinery (Nering Bögel), and textiles (Ankersmit) were produced until the mid to late 20th century. Some of these industries are still thriving today, such as beds and accessories (Auping) and publishing (Wolters Kluwer, now headquartered in Alphen aan den Rijn).

The city's trade and industry are still of some importance. The city is host to a factory producing central heating systems, as well as Wolters Kluwer, a global information services and publishing company.

The Deventer honey cake (Bussink Deventer Koek), produced in Deventer for over 500 years, is still manufactured locally and sold all over the Netherlands and beyond.

==== World War II ====
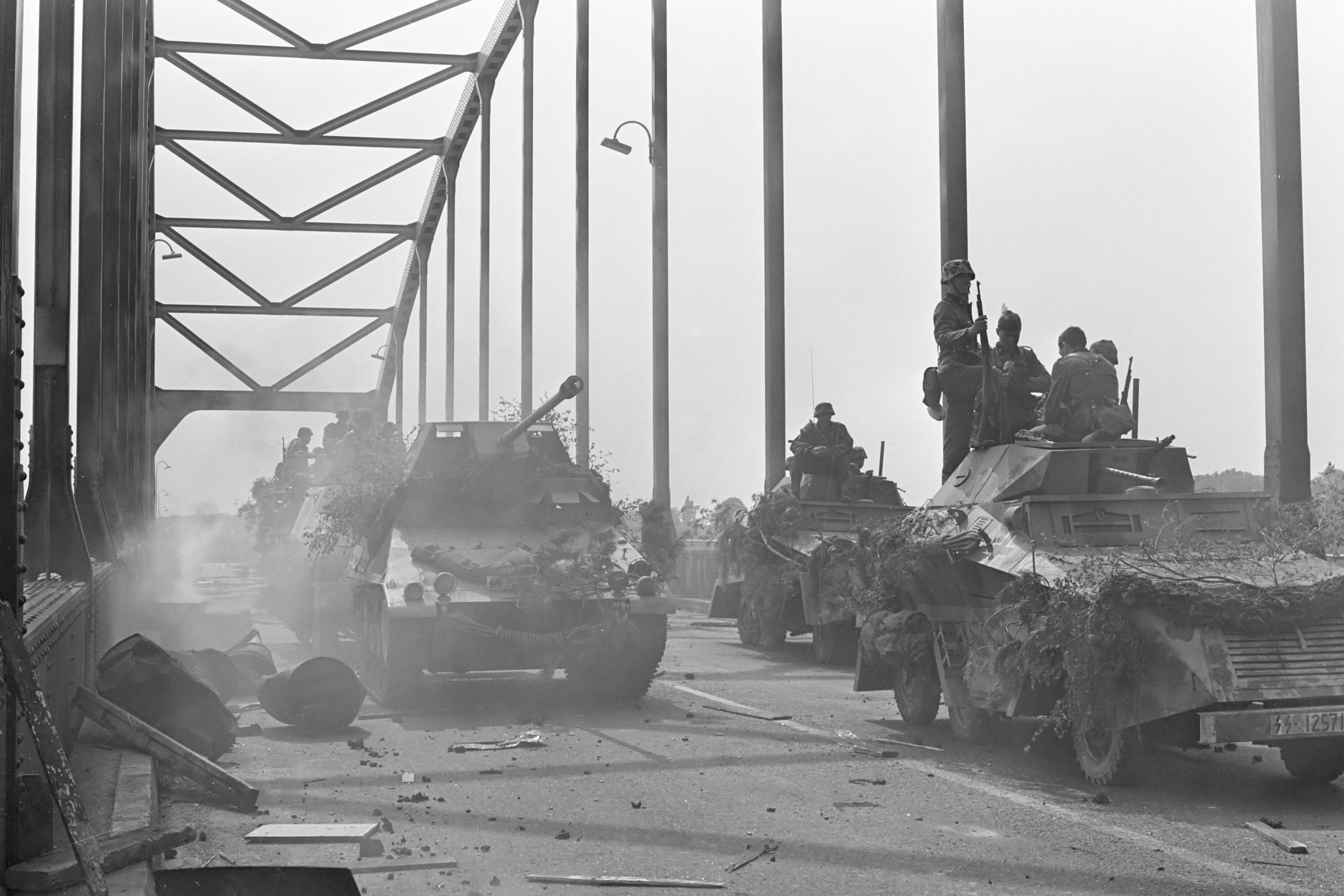
Shooting a scene from A Bridge Too Far on location in Deventer, 1977

Deventer has seen few military engagements throughout its long history, although it was a garrison city of the Dutch cavalry. The IJssel bridge area and harbour were bombed heavily during World War II. The city centre has been largely spared, but many Allied bombs, meant to shell the IJssel railway bridge, came down on buildings in the city centre. The Deventer railway bridge was considered strategically important, being a part of the main railway connection between Amsterdam and the German city of Osnabrück, leading from there to either Berlin, Hamburg or Bremen. The railway bridge, constructed of steel, was difficult to hit. Many bombs were bounced down into the river or its banks, exploding in the areas around the bridge or failing to explode at all. The three heaviest of about 15 attacks were on October 28, 1944 causing 35 fatalities; on December 15, 1944 killing 33 people; and on February 6, 1945 causing the death of 61 people. In the aftermath of this last bombardment, the German occupying forces committed a war crime. The German army used a cool warehouse in Deventer for its military food supplies. In the city centre, the retirement home of the United Foundations, originally dating back as far as the 13th century, caught fire by the shellings, as well as the army food warehouse. The Germans allowed local fire fighters only to extinguish the fire in the cool warehouse. The retirement home burnt down as good as totally. Over twenty of the elderly living there perished in the flames.

The Jewish poet and writer Etty Hillesum lived in Deventer during the war before being deported to Auschwitz.

In Schalkhaar, a village only 2 km northeast of the city centre, barracks were used by the German occupying forces to train Nazi policemen. The compound is now a centre for asylum seekers.

In a forested area between Lettele and Okkenbroek, about 10 kilometres east of Deventer, the Germans operated a V-1 flying bomb launching ramp. It was used from December, 1944, until March, 1945. Some of the 400 V-1 missiles launched there hit already liberated Belgium, including the city of Antwerp, killing many people. A war monument in the village of Lettele consists of concrete blocks from this launching site, that is a war monument itself as well.

Deventer has been somewhat popular with the film industry. During the production of the 1977 film A Bridge Too Far, all of the scenes taking place in nearby Arnhem were filmed in Deventer - as Arnhem itself had lost its historic centre.

By the end of the 1950s, the buildings had reached the boundaries of the municipality. In 1960, for further expansion, the part of the municipality of Diepenveen was annexed that now covers the Keizerslanden, Borgele and Platvoet districts, all three realized in the 1960s; all together roughly the area up to (west of) the Zandwetering.

After a plan to expand the city across the IJssel, the so-called Double City Plan, was deemed unfeasible at the end of the 1960s, Deventer turned its attention to the east again: in 1974 part of Diepenveen was once again annexed. On January 1, 1999, the municipality of Diepenveen was dissolved and added to Deventer. The same happened with the municipality of Bathmen on 1 January 2005.

== Demographics ==
Deventer has 101,378 Inhabitants on 1 July 2021.

=== Inhabitants by nationality ===
- 77.37% is Dutch
- 9.23% western migration background
- 13.4% non western migration background

== Geography ==
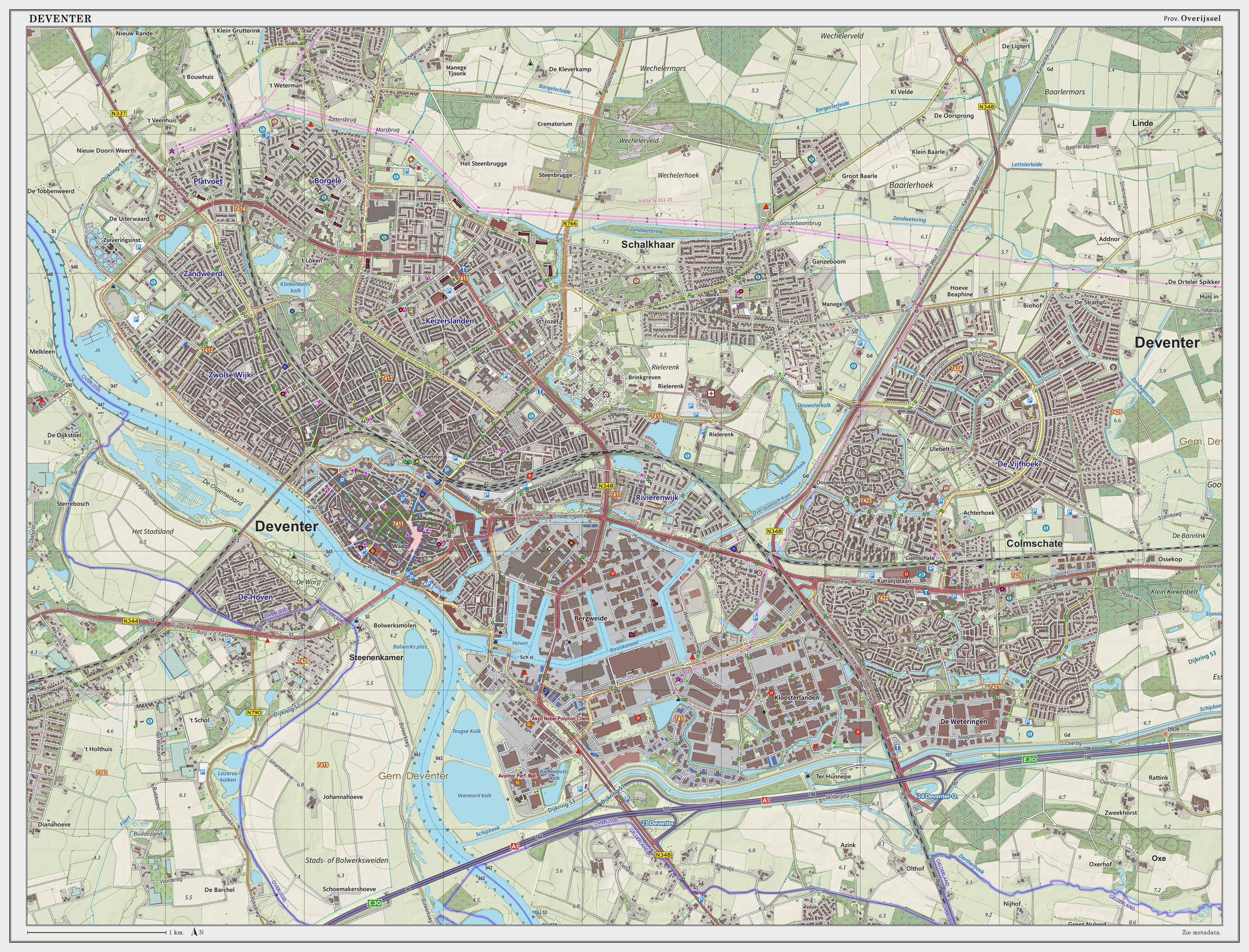
Dutch Topographic map of Deventer (city), June 2014

Associated hamlets at second level

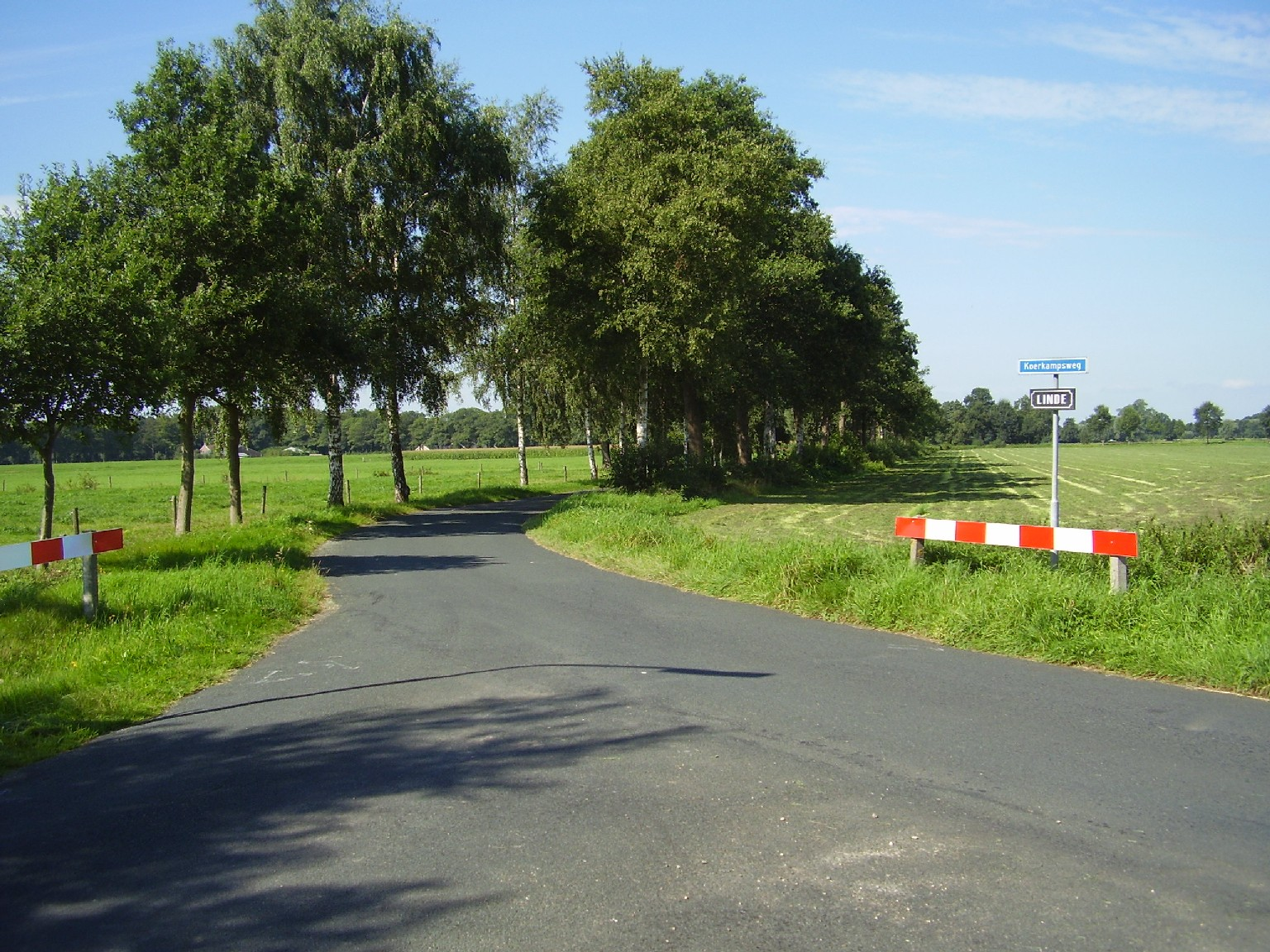
Linde in Lettele

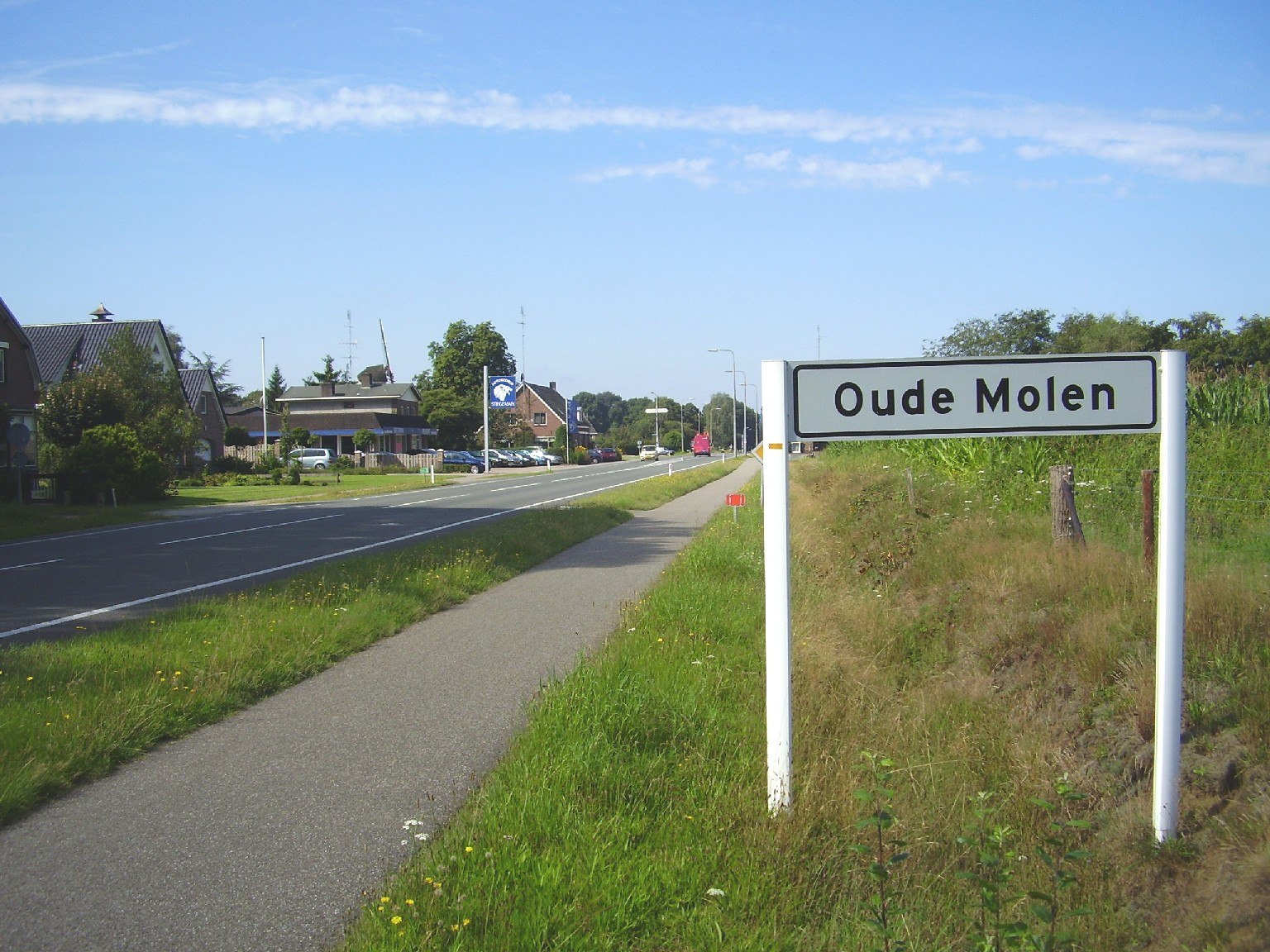
Oude Molen (old mill)

The population centres in the municipality are:

- Deventer (see below)
  - Snippeling (a small community about 2 km east of the city centre)
  - De Worp, the quarter west of the IJssel river
- Colmschate (Deventer suburb quarters surrounding eponymous village 4 km east of the city centre, ice skating hall, small railway station)
  - De Bannink
  - Oxe
- Diepenveen, a village 4 km to the north, surrounded by forest
  - Molenbelt
  - Rande
  - Tjoene
- Lettele, in a forest area
  - Linde
  - Oude Molen (old mill)
  - Zandbelt
- Okkenbroek
- Schalkhaar (former centre of Diepenveen municipality including Lettele and Okkenbroek until 1999)
  - Averlo
  - Frieswijk
- Bathmen (independent municipality until 2005)
  - Apenhuizen
  - Dortherhoek
  - Loo
  - Pieriksmars
  - Zuidloo

=== Climate ===
Deventer is in the Northern Hemisphere. Summer here starts at the end of June and ends in September. Deventer experiences an oceanic climate (Köppen climate classification Cfb) similar to almost all of the Netherlands.

Climate data for Deventer
Month	Jan	Feb	Mar	Apr	May	Jun	Jul	Aug	Sep	Oct	Nov	Dec	Year
Mean daily maximum °C (°F)	5.3 (41.5)	6.3 (43.3)	9.6 (49.3)	14.1 (57.4)	17.8 (64.0)	20.5 (68.9)	22.4 (72.3)	21.8 (71.2)	18.8 (65.8)	14.3 (57.7)	9.3 (48.7)	6.0 (42.8)	13.8 (56.8)
Daily mean °C (°F)	3.1 (37.6)	3.3 (37.9)	5.8 (42.4)	9.7 (49.5)	13.6 (56.5)	16.4 (61.5)	18.4 (65.1)	17.9 (64.2)	15.1 (59.2)	11.2 (52.2)	7.0 (44.6)	3.9 (39.0)	10.4 (50.7)
Mean daily minimum °C (°F)	0.9 (33.6)	0.7 (33.3)	2.2 (36.0)	5.2 (41.4)	9.0 (48.2)	11.9 (53.4)	14.2 (57.6)	13.9 (57.0)	11.6 (52.9)	8.4 (47.1)	4.7 (40.5)	1.8 (35.2)	7.0 (44.6)
Average precipitation mm (inches)	71.0 (2.80)	58.0 (2.28)	60.0 (2.36)	55 (2.2)	67.0 (2.64)	74.0 (2.91)	86.0 (3.39)	83.0 (3.27)	70.0 (2.76)	66.0 (2.60)	66.0 (2.60)	74.0 (2.91)	830.0 (32.68)
Mean monthly sunshine hours	72.0	96.0	127.2	189.6	216.0	228.0	235.2	208.8	165.6	124.8	86.4	69.6	1,819.2
Source: Climate-Data.org

=== Water ===
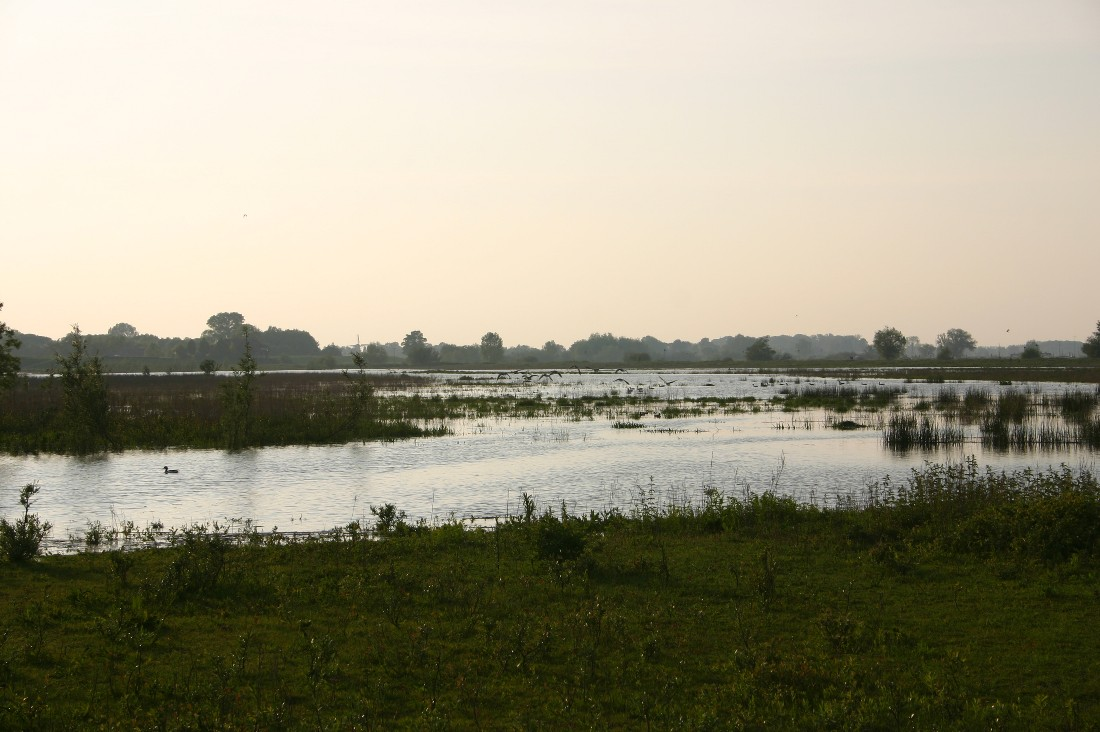
Floodplains near Deventer

The Deventer settlement was founded on a river dune on the IJssel. This river has played a major role for the city over the centuries, because of the trade that this waterway brought with it. In 1241 the city had received the Katentol on long lease from the Elten stift. This toll, which is named after the Katerveer under Zwolle, had to be paid in the Deventer toll house near the Zandpoort, and generated a lot of money in the Middle Ages.

The IJssel has also caused many problems over the centuries, because it often overflowed its banks. Nowadays Deventer has a flood defence, but the Welle ('wal', the name of the street over the quay) is still regularly under water during high water. Dike breaches of the IJssel have created many gullies in and around the city, such as the Douwelerkolk and the Klinkenbeltskolk.

In addition to the IJssel, Deventer has a number of smaller rivers. The Schipbeek is a stream partly dug on behalf of the city that rises in Germany and flows into the IJssel near Deventer. In the past, the stream was navigable, so that wood and Bentheimer sandstone could be brought in, among other things. Another waterway that was built for shipping and which flows into the IJssel in Deventer is a branch of the Overijssels canal, through which Deventer was connected to a large system of canals through Overijssel. It was dug in the mid-19th century and opened in 1858.

== Culture ==
=== Sights ===
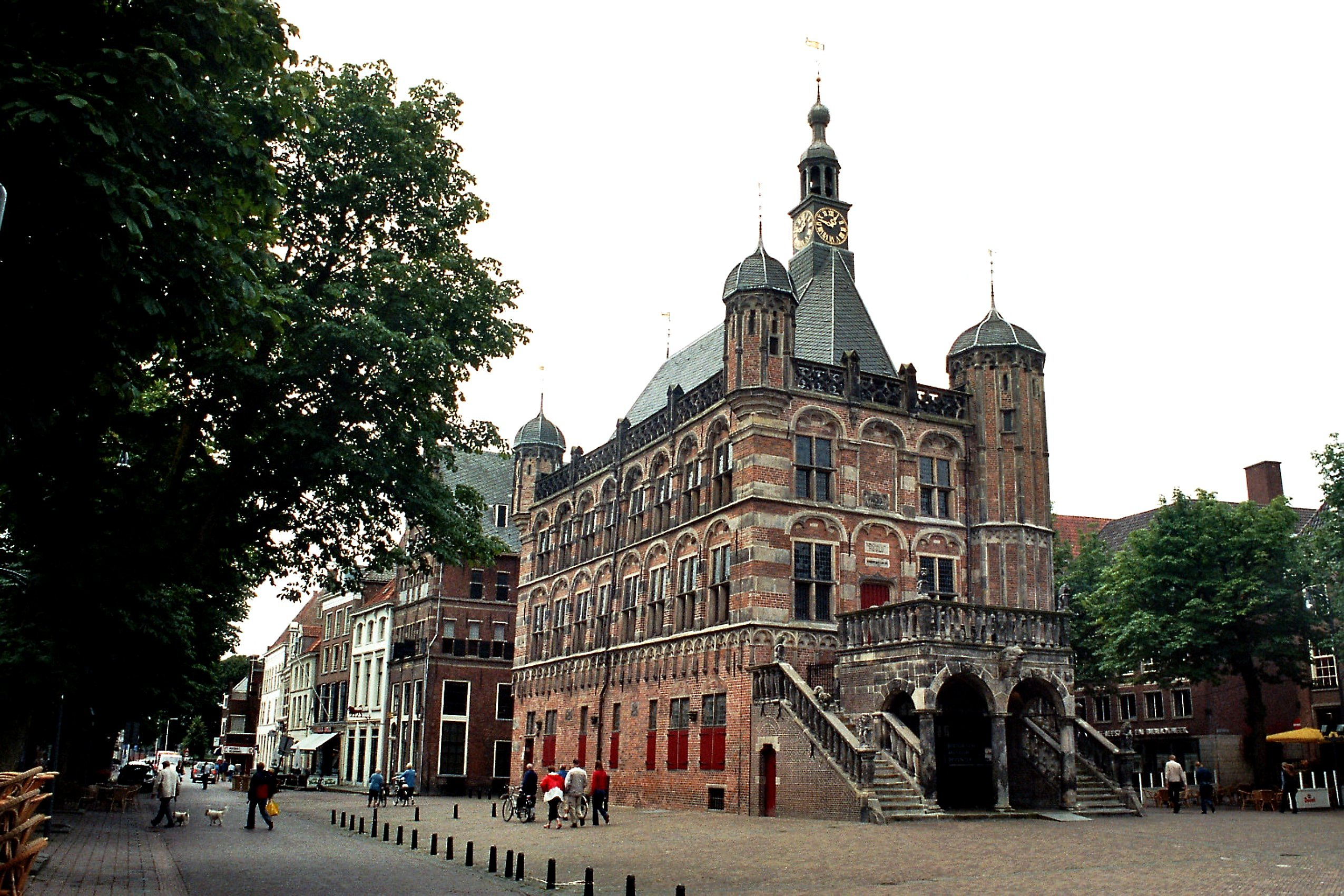
De Waag

- The Grote Kerkhof square (Grand Churchyard).
- The Saint Lebuïnuskerk (St. Lebuin's Church) in Gothic style, with ceiling paintings and an organ. Its tower can be climbed in summer.
- The City Hall with a façade built in 1693 in Dutch Baroque style.
- The Brink (market square) with houses, shops, and cafes dating from 1575 to 1900. The market square is also the centre of Deventer nightlife. Alongside this square there is the Bussink "Koekhuisje", where the honey-cake Deventer Koek is sold. Markets take place every Friday (including one on Good Friday, following a medieval tradition) and Saturday.

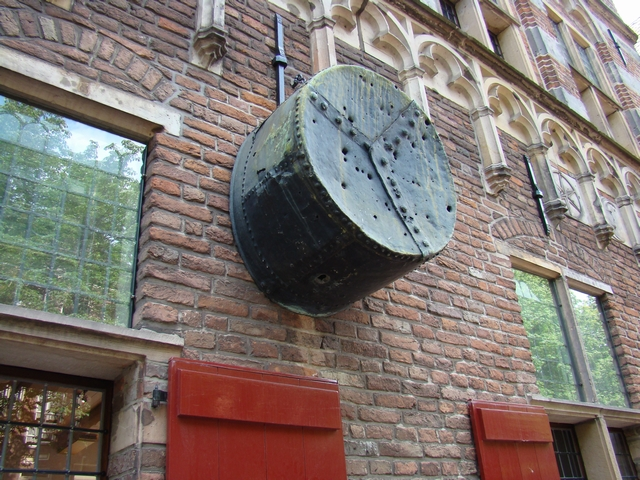
Execution kettle

- The Waag (Weighing-house) on the edge of the Brink square, built in 1550 and restored in 2003. The Deventer City Museum is housed inside the Waag. The Museum's collections include industrial and trading history, paintings by Gerard Terborch and Han van Meegeren, silver objects, and prehistoric findings). Thea Beckman's novel Het wonder van Frieswijck ("The Frieswijck Miracle") features the Waag.
  - On the outer wall of the Waag hung until 2016 a large kettle that is over 500 years old, said to have been used for a public execution in the late Middle Ages; a man who had produced counterfeit coins was cooked to death in it. According to local tradition, there are holes in the kettle shot by footmen of Napoleon's army around 1809. In 2017 the kettle has been placed inside the building, at the entrance of the museum.
- The Speelgoedmuseum (Toy Museum) behind the Waag, housed in an old house in the city called De Drie Haringen ('The Three Herrings').
- The Great Synagogue of Deventer in Neo-Renaissance style with Moorish influences.
- The medieval Bergkerk (Mountain Church), on top of a small hill (old river dune), now a place for expositions and concerts.
- The old streets around the Bergkerk, known as Bergkwartier (Mountain Quarter) situated on and around the old river dune.
- The Broederenkerk (Friars church) in Gothic and neo-Gothic style
- The Stadsarchief en Athenaeumbibliotheek (City Archive and Athenaeum Library), the oldest scientific library of the Netherlands (founded in 1560).
- De Proosdij in the Sandrasteeg is the oldest stone house of the Netherlands still in use. The earliest parts dating back to around 1130.
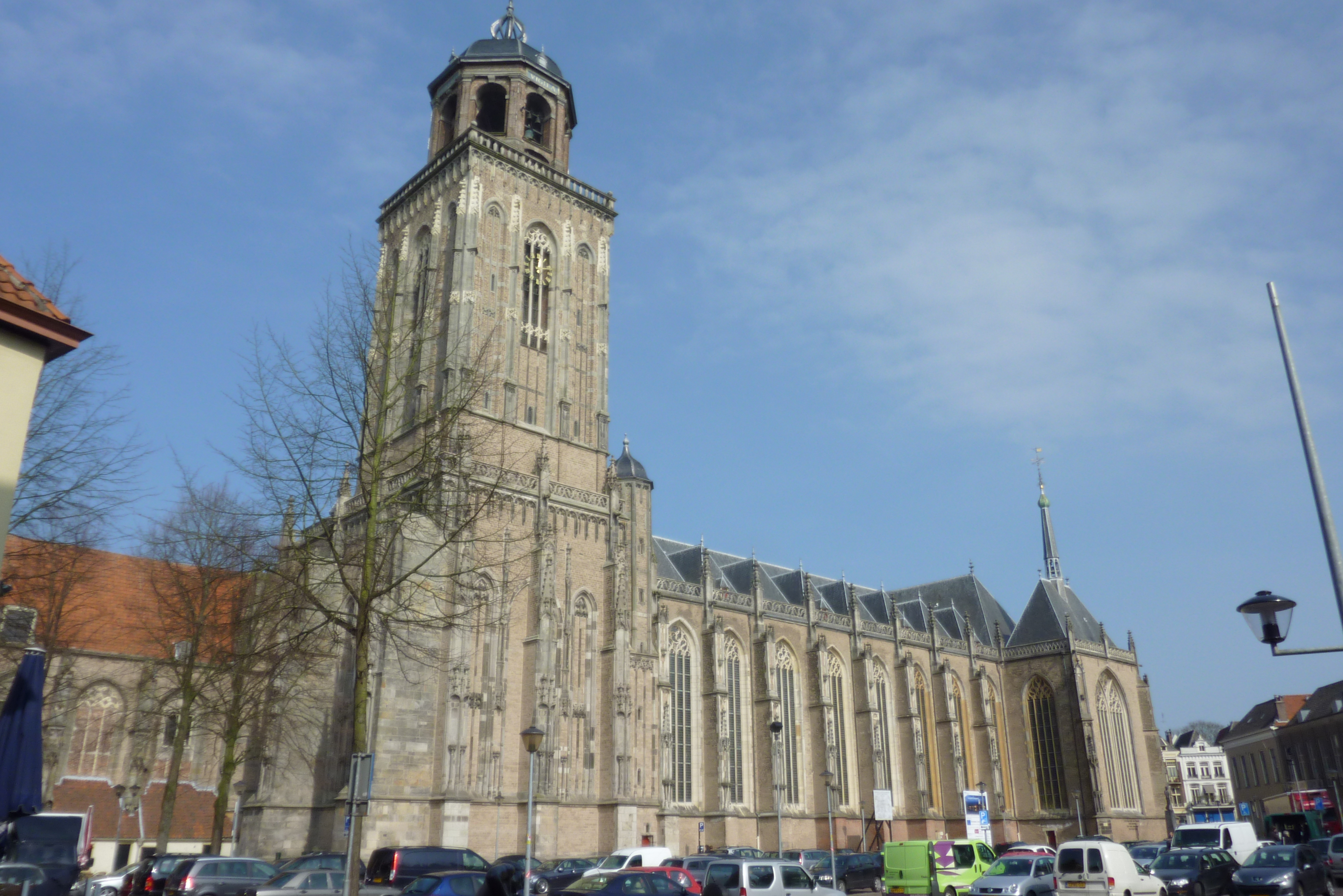
St. Lebuinus Church

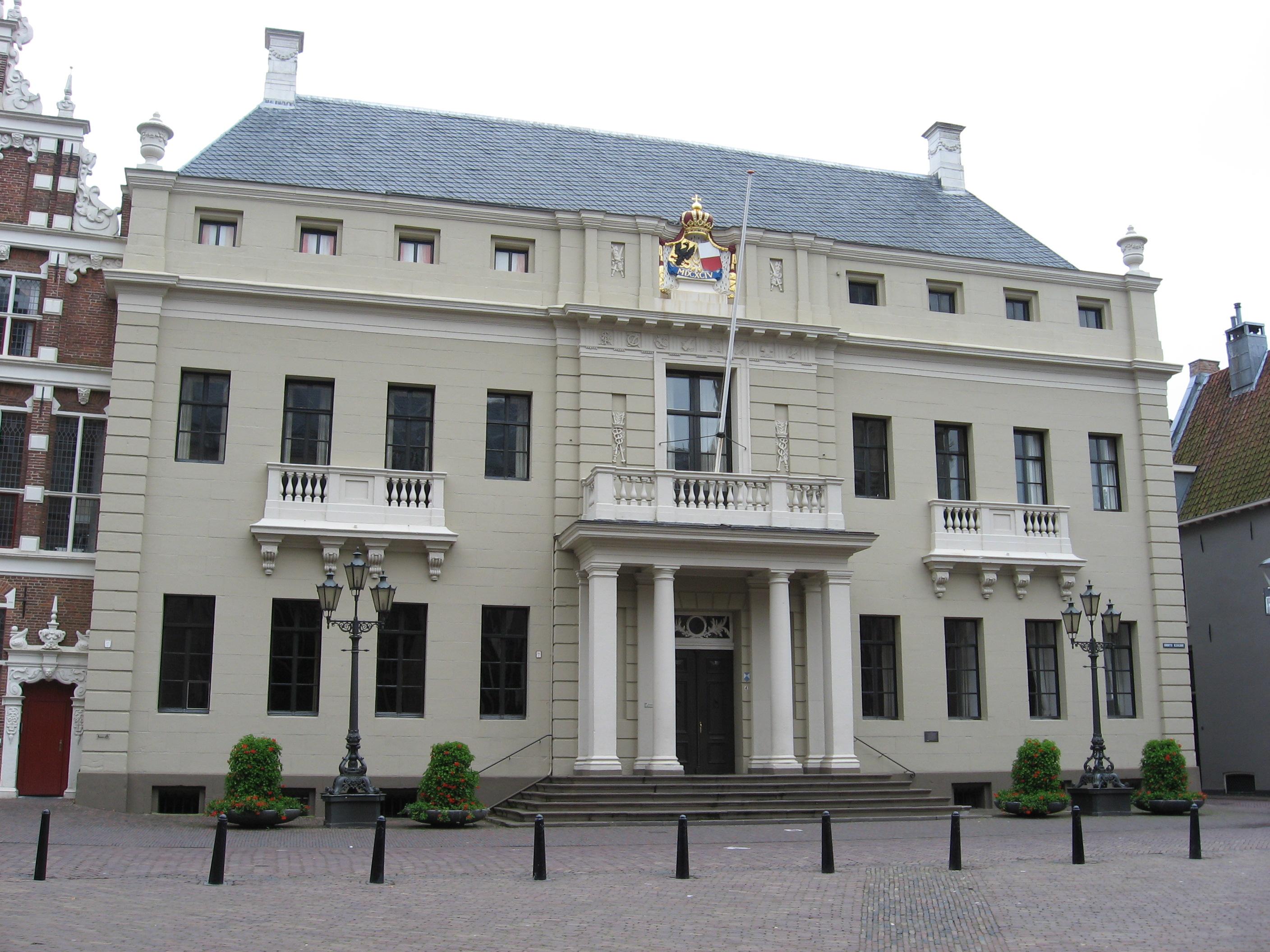
Deventer City Hall

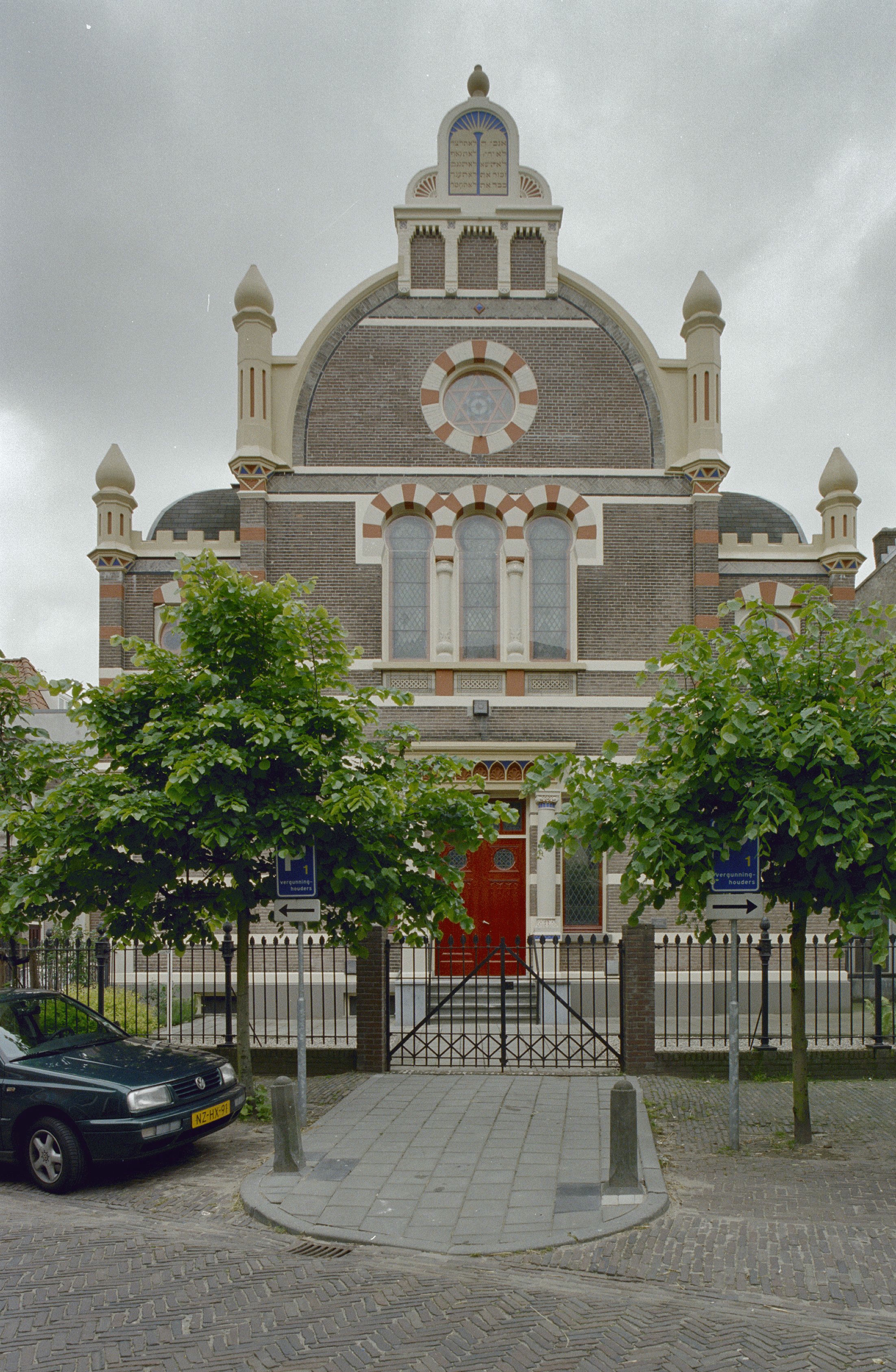
Great Synagogue of Deventer

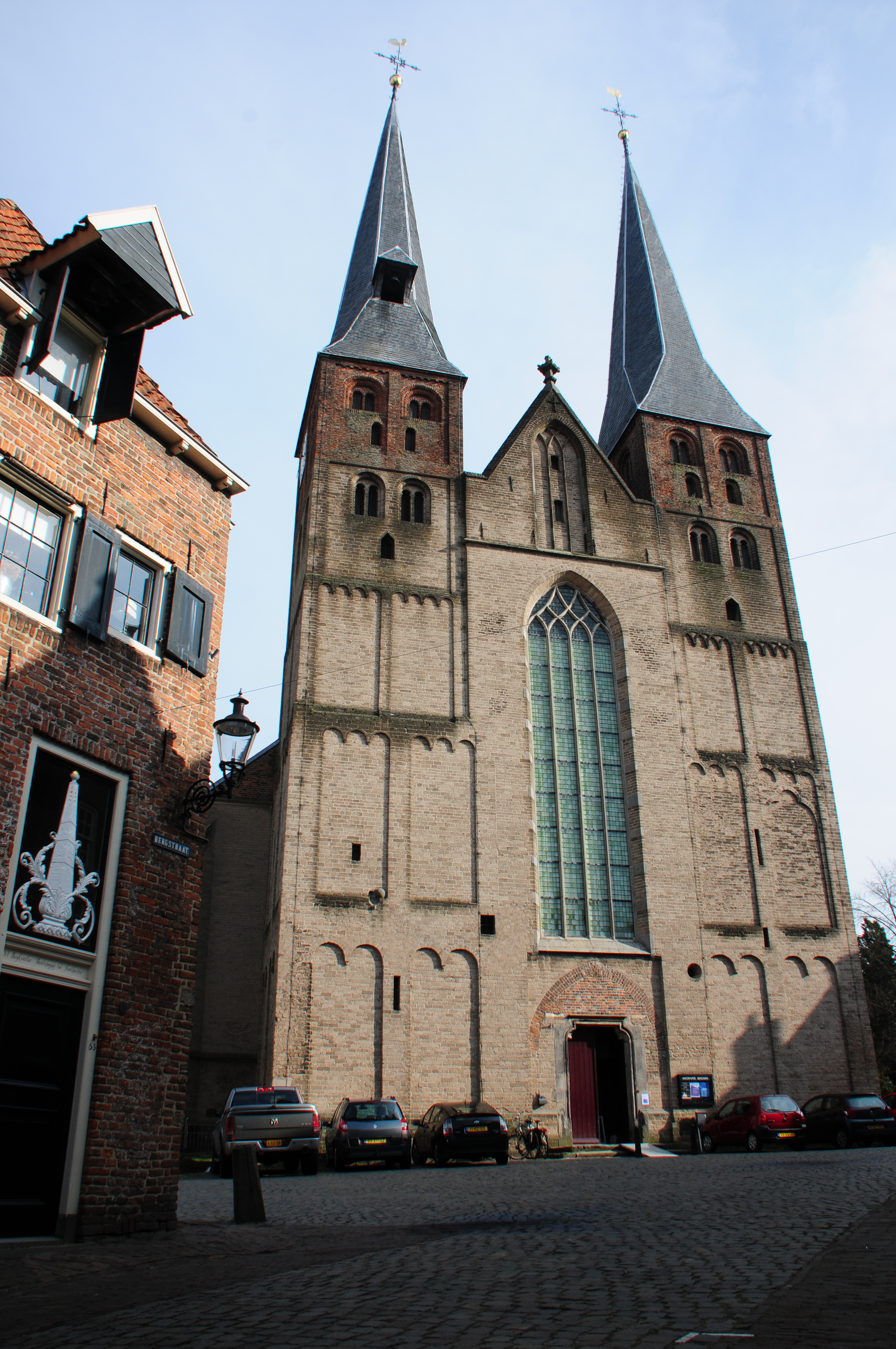
St. Nicholas Church

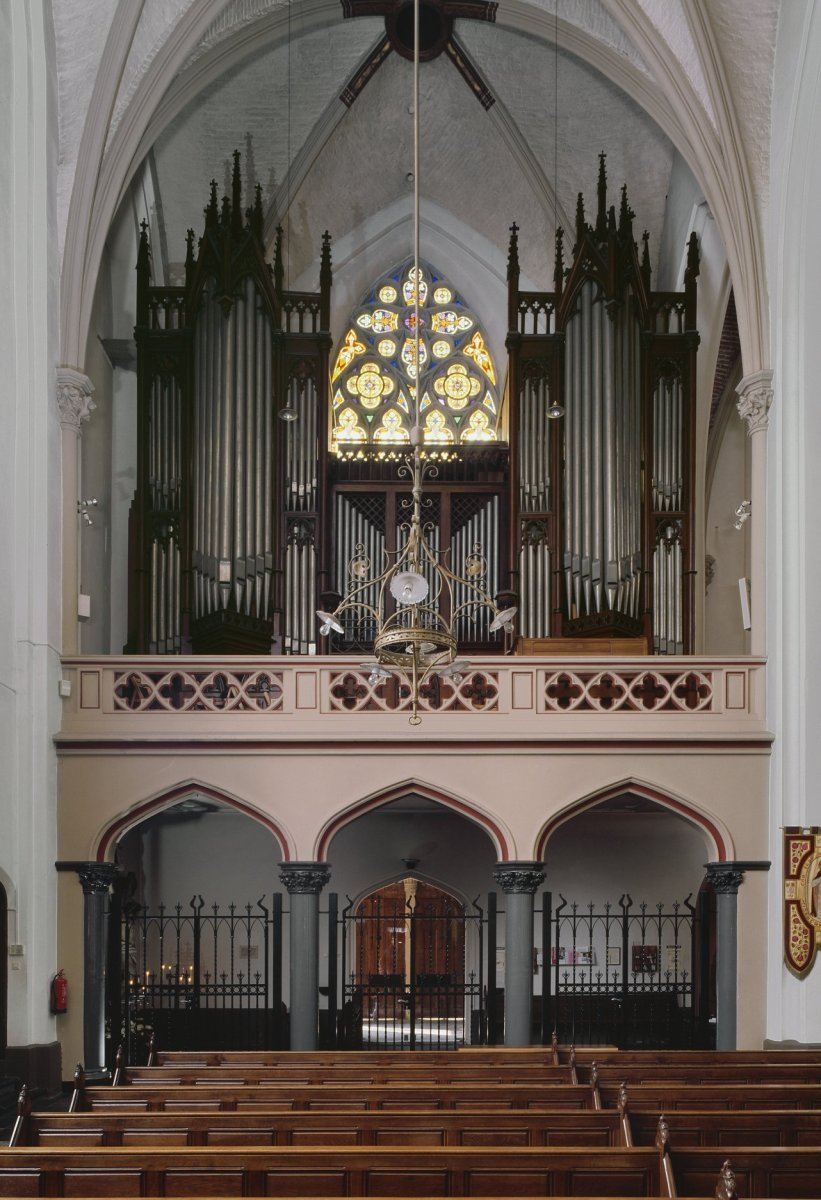
Interior of Broederenkerk

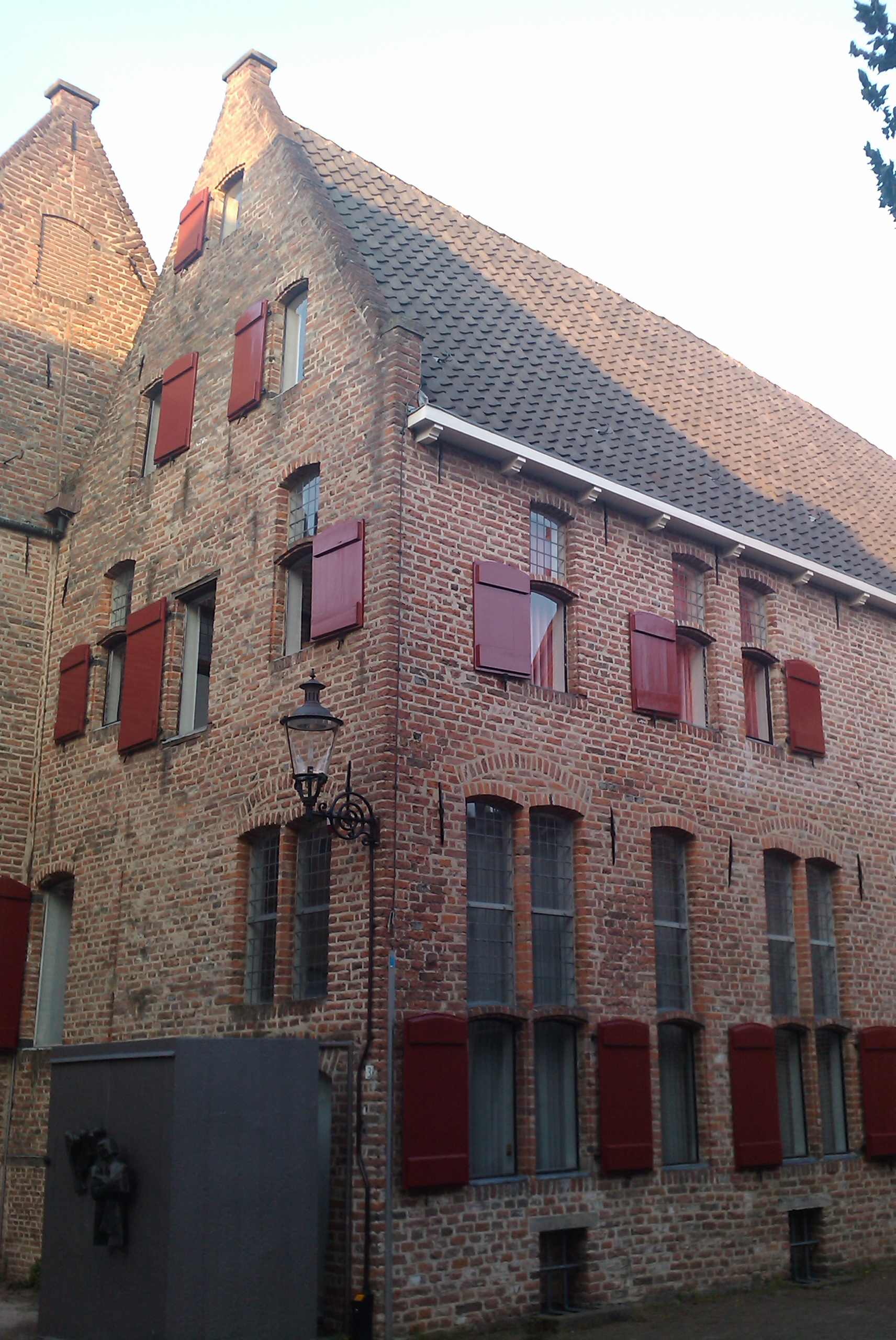
City Archives and Athenaeum Library

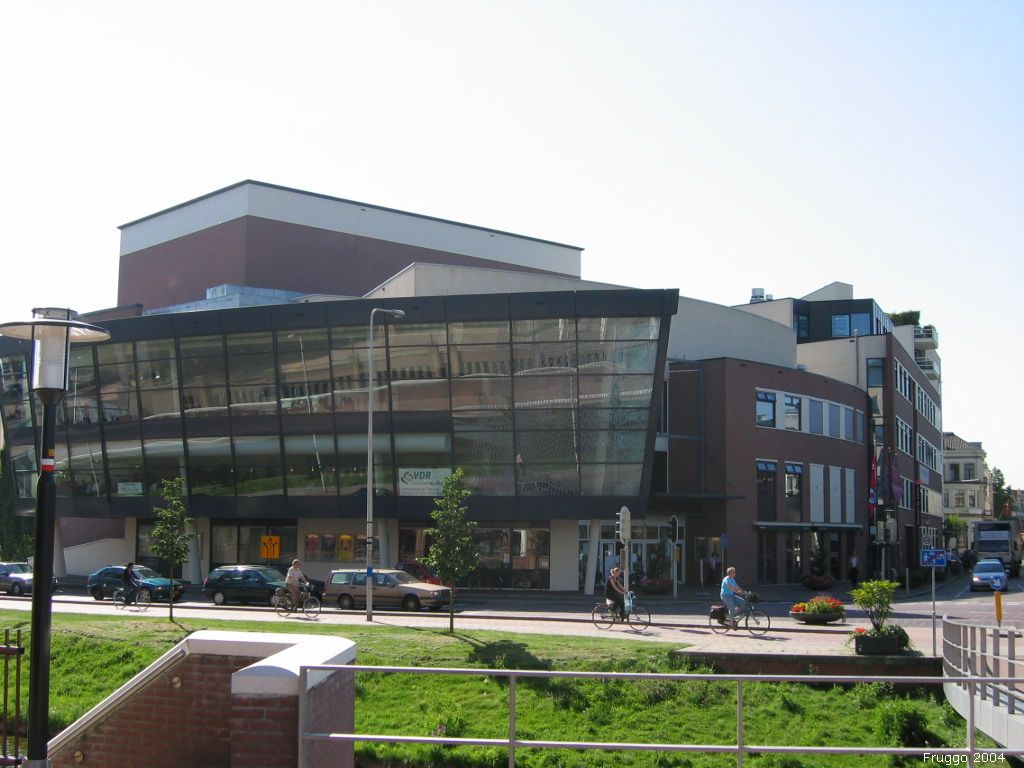
Theater of Deventer

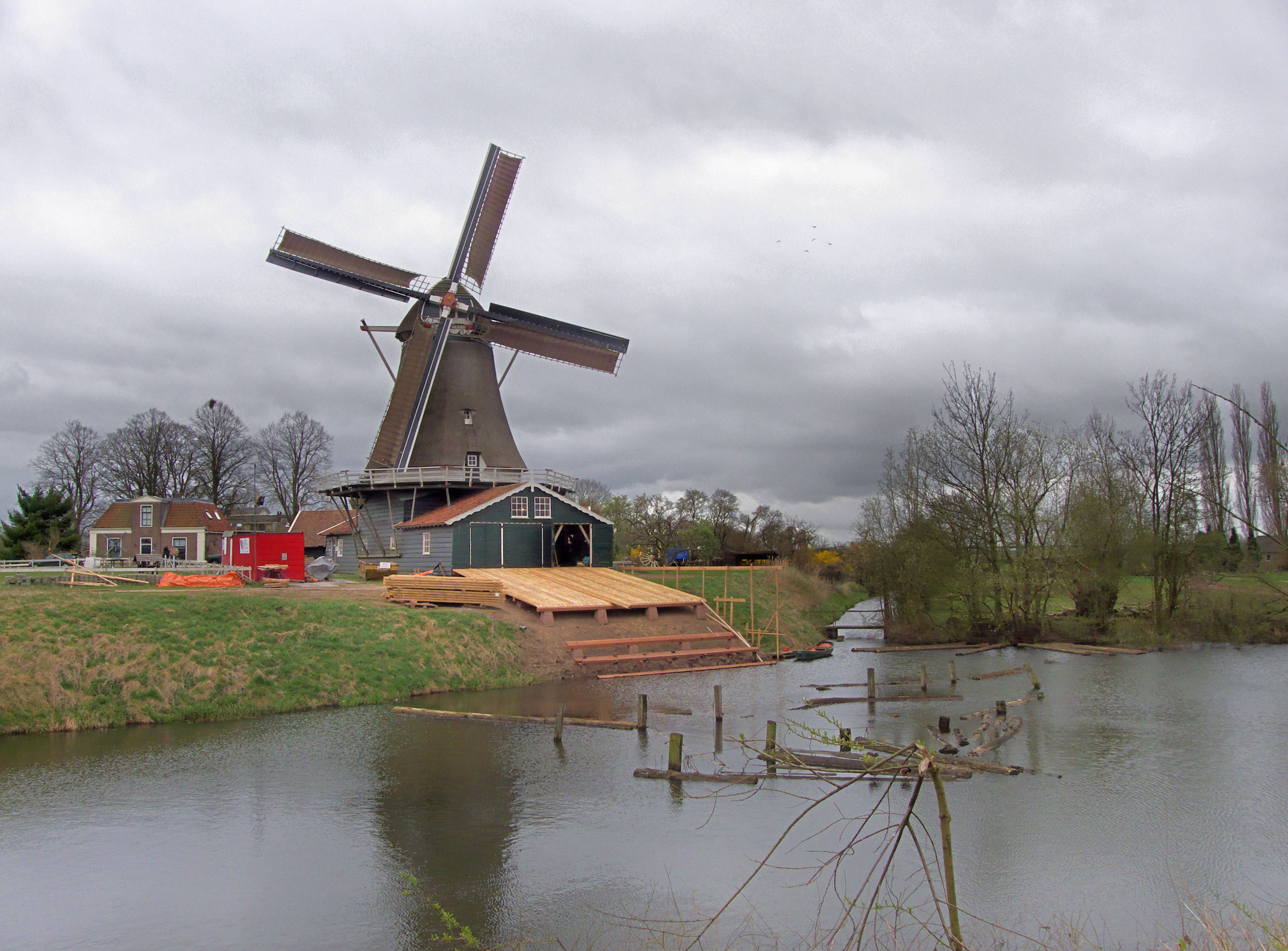
The 19th-century Bolwerksmolen

=== Sports ===
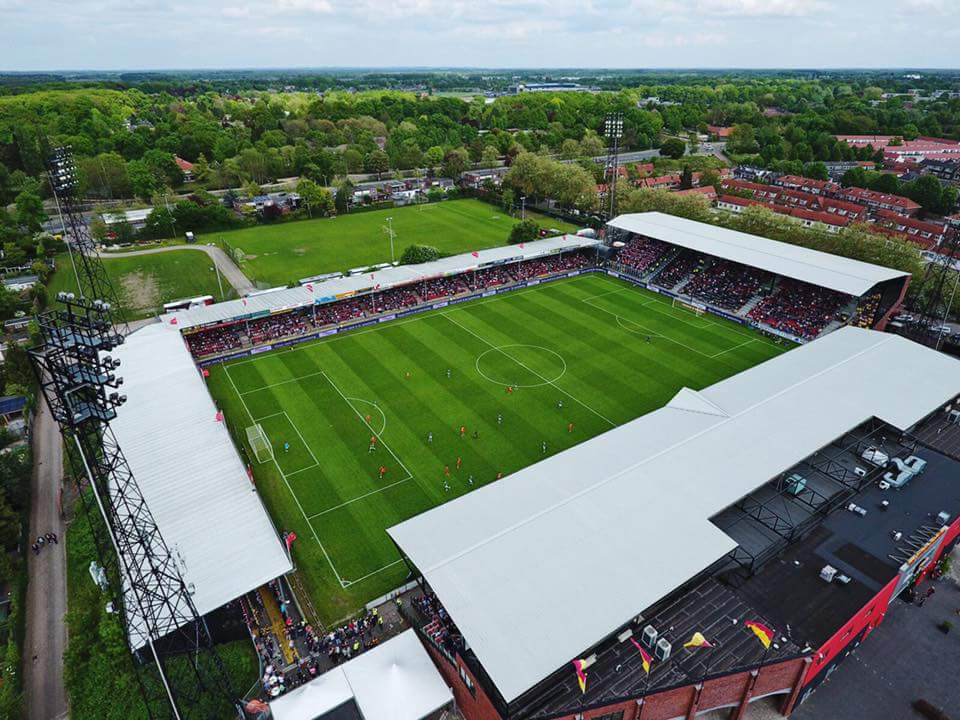
De Adelaarshorst Stadium

Deventer is the home of professional Football club Go Ahead Eagles, who are housed in stadium De Adelaarshorst. De Adelaarshorst is situated in a 1930s neighbourhood and one of the oldest stadiums still in use today. The club was founded in 1902 as Be Quick, although the name was soon changed to Go Ahead at the request of the Dutch Football Association. The suffix Eagles was added in 1971, following a suggestion from the then coach, Barry Hughes. Go Ahead Eagles has been the club of Marc Overmars, Paul Bosvelt, and Bert van Marwijk, whilst providing Henk ten Cate and Leo Beenhakker with their first experience of management.

The 1992 founded skating rink De Scheg, which is semi-indoor since 2011, is in the top 10 of fastest skating tracks of the Netherlands. It has been the training accommodation of skaters including Olympic champion Mark Tuitert and the retired former world champion sprint Erben Wennemars.

Deventer also houses a number of watersports clubs, due to its situation on the banks of the river IJssel.

=== Events and festivals ===
- In the first weekend of July, the city centre is the scene of the open air festival "Deventer op stelten" (Deventer on Stilts). Actors and artists give performances in the streets and on the Brink square. Originally all actors used stilts during their acts.
- In August, Deventer is home to Europe's largest book fair, attracting 125,000 visitors.
- The Dickens Festival in December sees some of the oldest streets and alleys in the city dressed up in the style of the Victorian era. In 2018, the festival attracted 125,000 visitors.

== Government ==
=== City council ===
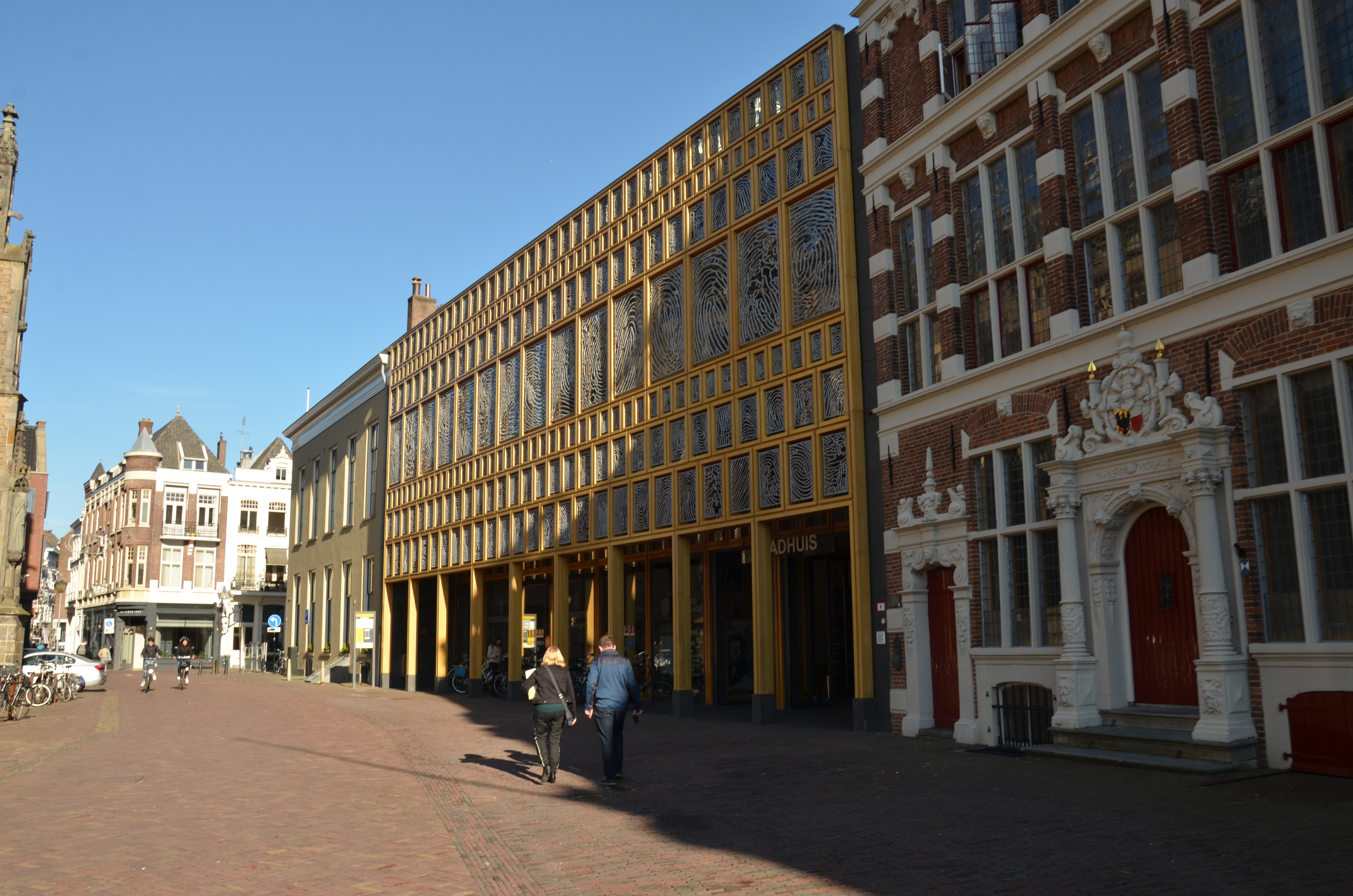
The Deventer City Office (2015), built alongside the old City Hall

In the redivision elections of November 17, 2004, a municipal executive was elected for the period 2005-2010. This municipal election was earlier than in the rest of the Netherlands, because the municipality of Deventer was merged with the then municipality of Bathmen. The March 2006 elections were therefore skipped.

An issue that has occupied the municipal council and public opinion in Deventer since 2006 was the housing of municipal officials and public services in a (new) municipal office adjacent to the old town hall of Deventer. In 2009, the college fell over it. At the end of January 2012, the Municipal Executive approved an adapted design for the new city office by architect Michiel Riedijk. However, a 'popular poll' by telephone two weeks later would have shown that only 13% of the population of Deventer supported the plans. On March 21 that year, a large majority of the city council voted in favor of the municipal office. In October 2013, the Council of State ruled positive about the arrival of the municipal office, after objections were raised. On December 6 of that year, the official opening act for construction was performed. In December 2015, the complex was completed and municipal staff moved in. In November 2017, the architect received the Abe Bonnema Prize for the design.

== Economy ==
=== Business ===
- Girasolar, founded in 2003

== Education ==
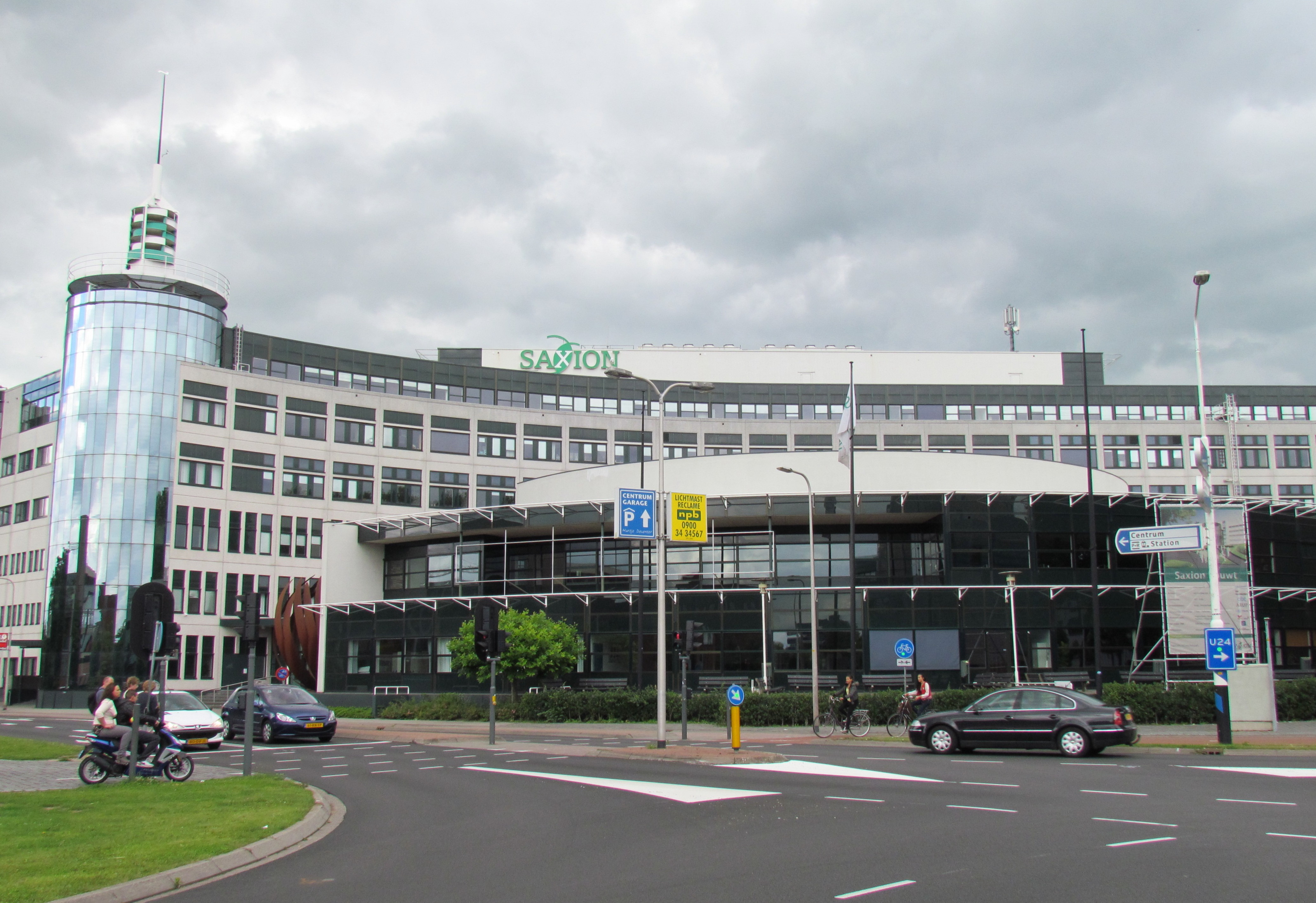
Saxion University of Applied Sciences

Deventer is also home to one of the three campuses of Saxion University of Applied Sciences (Saxion Hogeschool), a polytechnical school offering internationally recognized Bachelor's degrees and Master's degrees in a wide range of fields, including engineering, economics, social work, investigations and health care. The other campuses are located in Enschede and Apeldoorn.

In 1912 the Secondary Colonial Agricultural School was founded, which grew out of the National Agricultural School Wageningen. After decolonization took effect, the name was changed into Tropical Agricultural School. In 1957 the school was transformed into the National Higher School for Tropical Agriculture. After a merger with study programs from Boskoop, Wageningen and Velp, it became the International Agricultural College Larenstein. The school was located at the Ceintuurbaan/Brinkgreverweg intersection. The building was given a residential destination in 2018.

== Transport ==
=== Rail ===
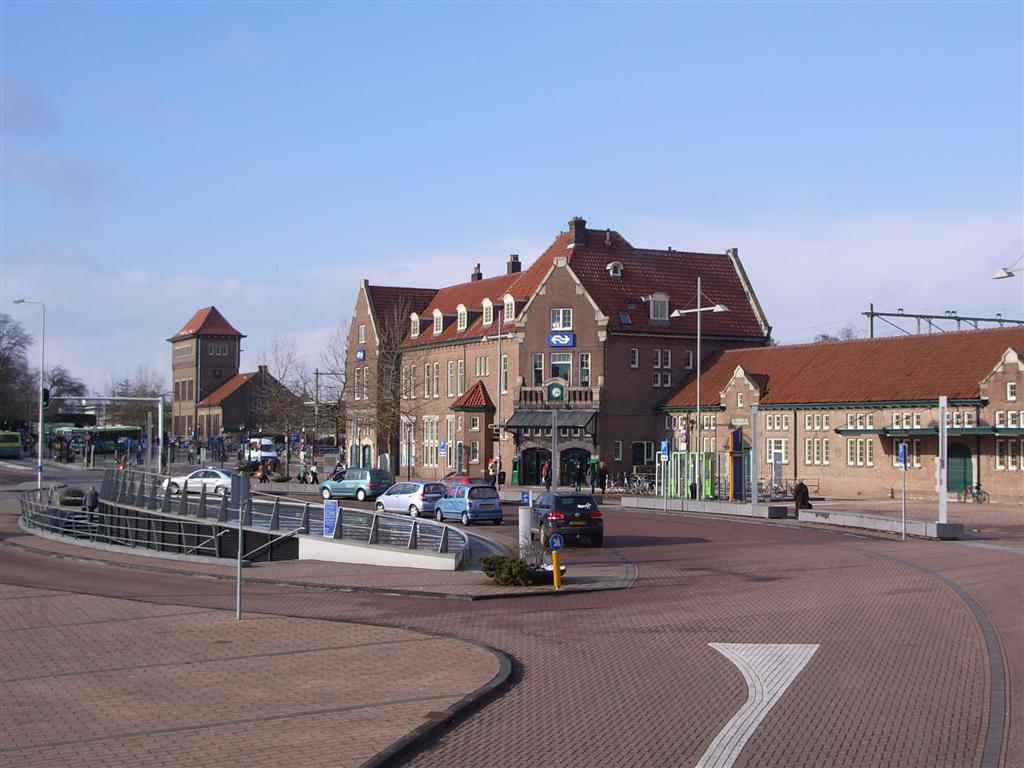
Deventer railway station

Since 1989, Deventer has two train stations, Deventer railway station and Deventer Colmschate station. Previously, Deventer has known several so-called stopping points. Most of them closed around 1920. In addition to the current rail connections from Deventer train station, over the Arnhem–Leeuwarden railway, Apeldoorn–Deventer railway, and Deventer–Almelo railway lines, a train connection existed from 1910 to 1935 on the Deventer–Ommen railway line. This was operated by the Overijsselsche Lokaalspoorweg-Maatschappij Deventer - Ommen (OLDO), but had to stop the train service due to competition from the bus.

=== Public transport ===
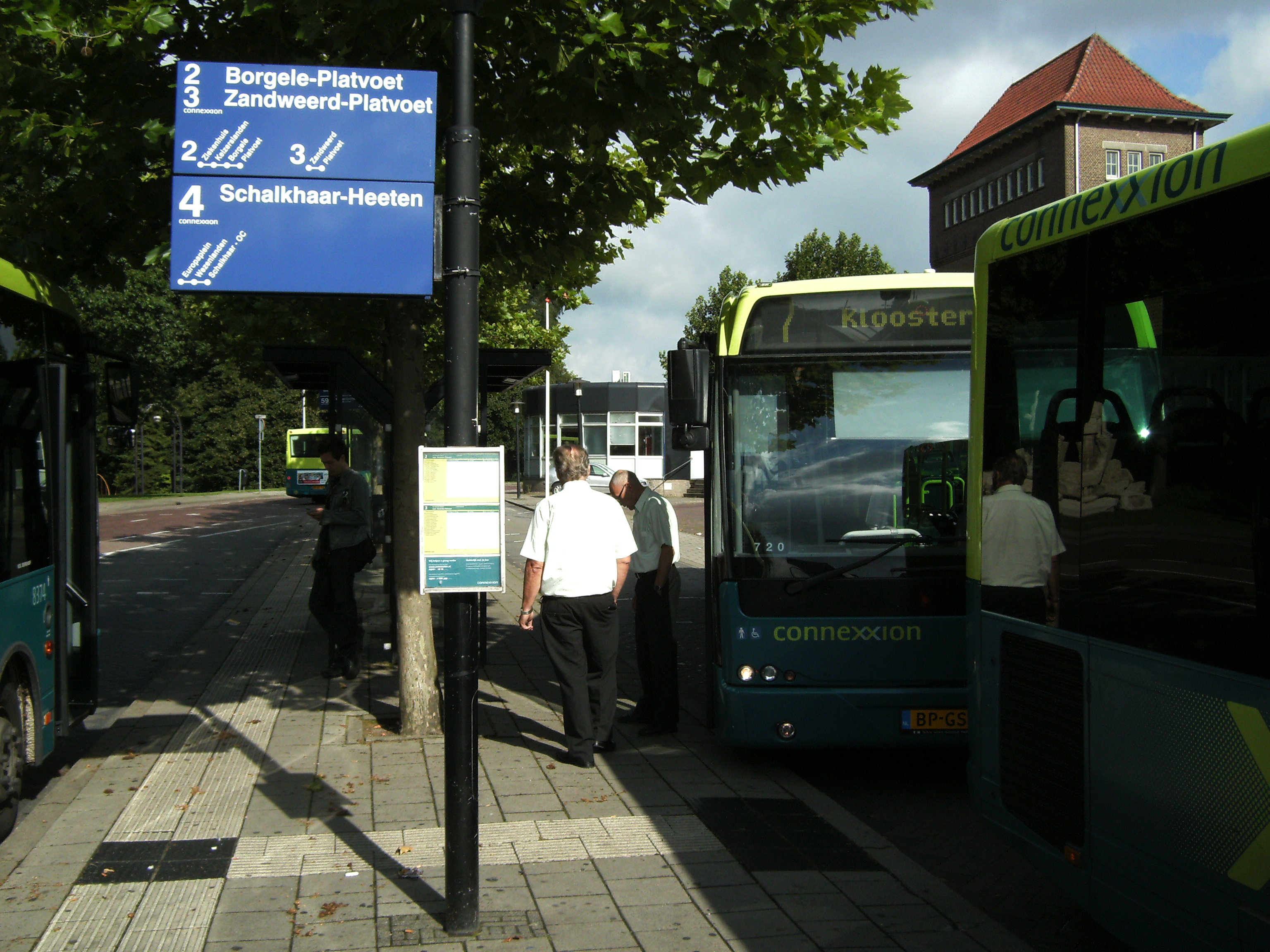
A bus station in Deventer

In the 19th and 20th centuries, Deventer was connected to the extensive tram network of the Achterhoek. The tram line between Deventer and Borculo was operated from 1885 to 1944 by the Geldersch-Overijsselsche Stoomtram Maatschappij (GOSM) and its successors. Another tram company, the Tramweg Maatschappij Zutphen-Emmerik, operated the tram line between Deventer and Zutphen. The tram station of Deventer stood on the Pothoofd. It was not combined with Deventer train station because the trams were too heavy to drive over two intermediate bridges. It seemed unprofitable for the tram company to reinforce two bridges, so they used the Pothoofd as a terminal station. After the Second World War, the tram lines were dismantled.

Since the end of 2020, bus transport has been provided by Keolis Nederland under the name RRReis, with the exception of the lines from the Achterhoek, which are provided by Arriva.

== Notable residents ==
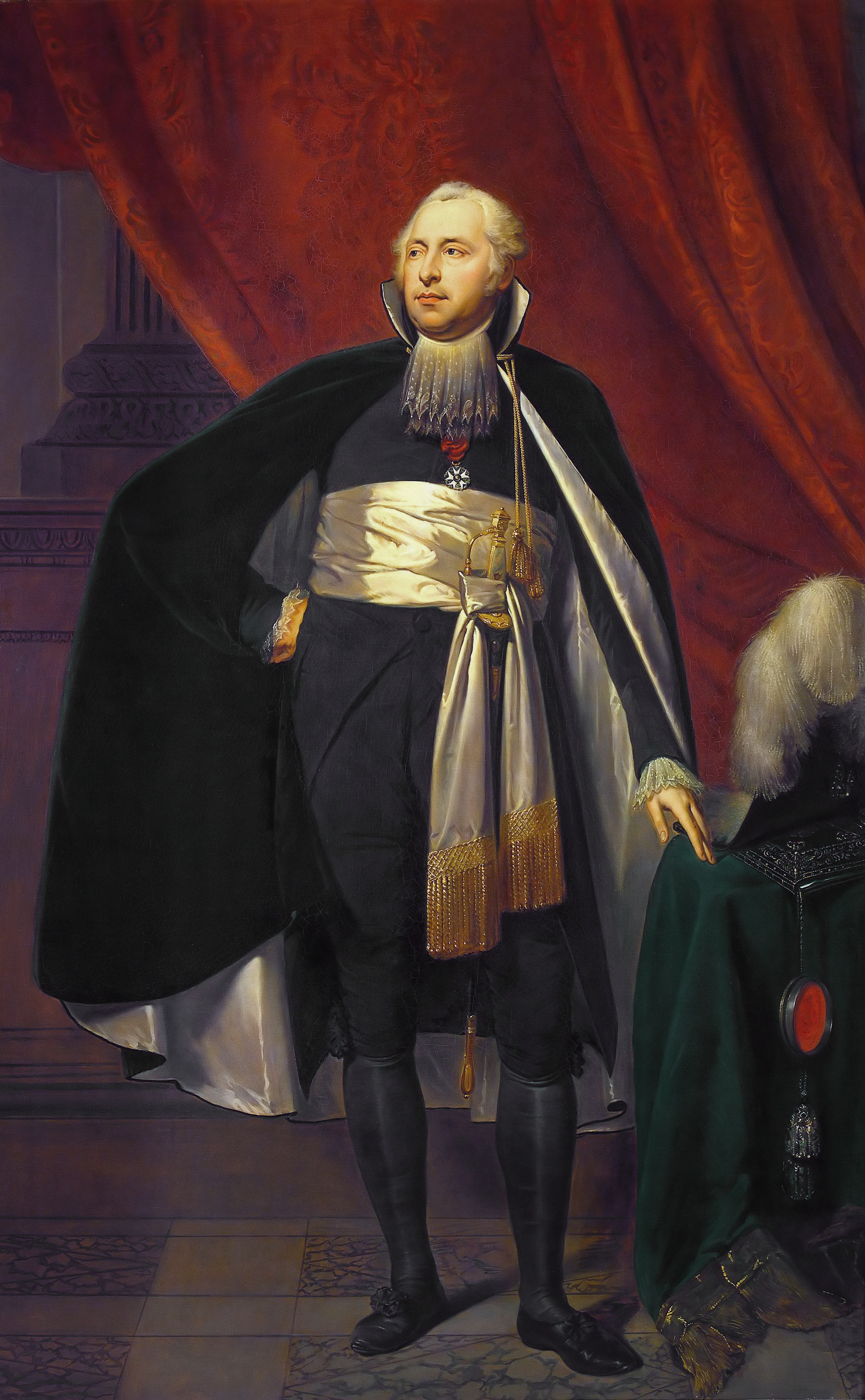
Rutger Jan Schimmelpenninck, ca.1805

=== Public thinking & public service ===
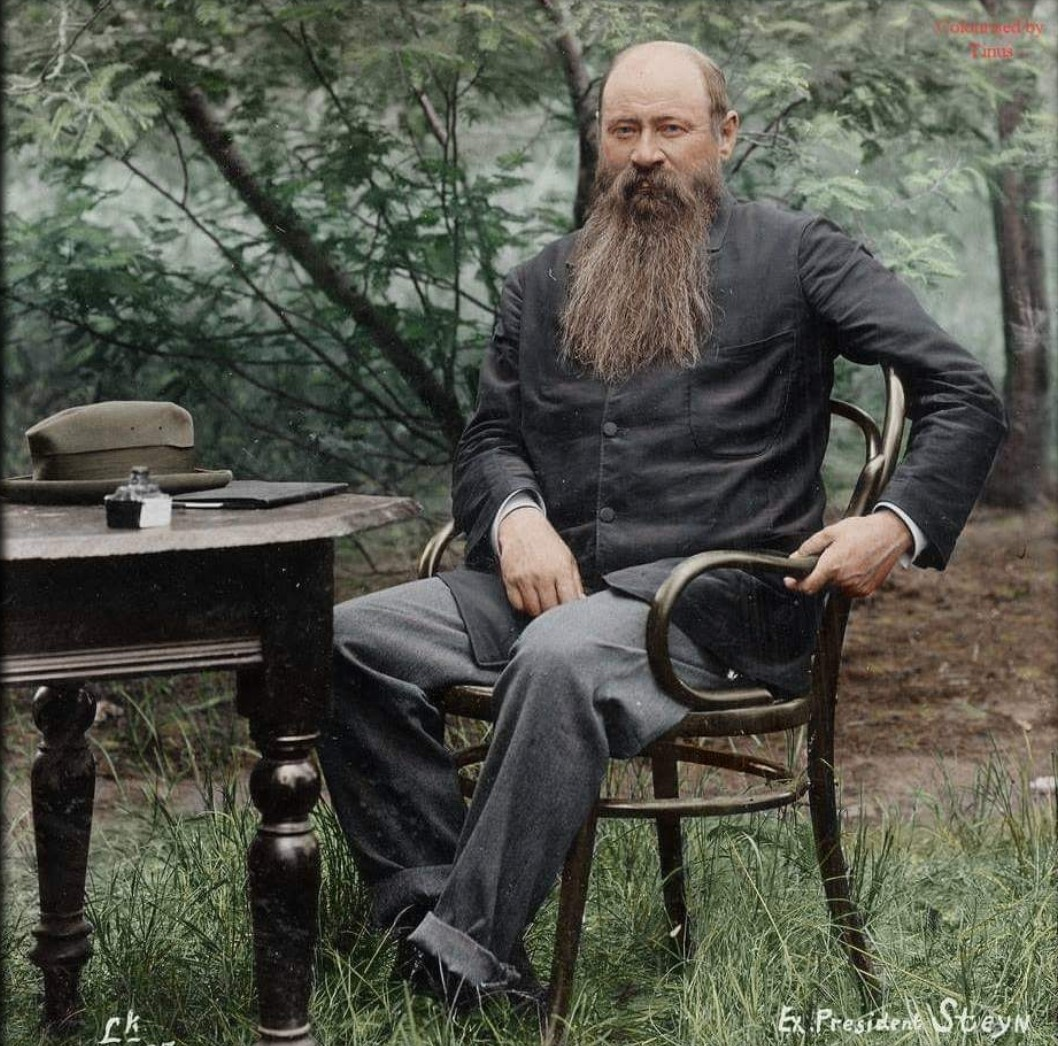
M.T. Steyn

- Lebuinus (??-ca.775) the Apostle of the Frisians and patron of Deventer
- Saint Radboud (before 850 – 917) Bishop of Utrecht 899 to 917
- Geert Groote (1340–1384) a Dutch Roman Catholic deacon, founder of the Brethren of the Common Life
- Gerlac Peterssen (ca.1377 – 1411) a Dutch mystic
- Alexander Hegius von Heek (ca.1435–1498) a German humanist who settled in Deventer
- Jan Pieterszoon Sweelinck (1562-1621) a Dutch composer and organist at the Oude Kerk in Amsterdam was born in Deventer
- Jacobus Revius (1586–1658) a Dutch poet, Calvinist theologian and church historian
- Samuel Holland (1728–1801) a Royal Engineer and Surveyor General of British North America
- Abraham Josias Sluysken (1736-1799) last Governor of the Dutch Cape Colony
- Rutger Jan Schimmelpenninck (1761–1825) a Dutch jurist, ambassador, politician and Grand Pensionary of the Batavian Republic
- Frans Adam van der Duyn van Maasdam (1771-1848) nobleman, officer and politician
- Louis Gerlach Pareau (1800–1866) a theologian and academic, co-founded Groningen theology
- Willem Jan Knoop (1811–1894) a Dutch lieutenant-general, military historian, and politician
- W. R. van Hoëvell (1812–1879) a minister in the Dutch East Indies, politician and reformer
- Elisabeth van Dedem Lecky (1842–1912) a Dutch-Irish writer, historian and suffragist
- Martinus Theunis Steyn (1857–1916) a South African lawyer, politician and statesman
- Han Hollander (1886–1943) the first Dutch radio sports journalist
- Etty Hillesum (1914–1943) wrote about the persecutions of the Jews during the German occupation
- Bé Udink (1926–2016) a Dutch politician, government minister, diplomat and businessman
- Willem Scholten (1927–2005) a Dutch politician, government minister and economist
- Jomanda (born 1948) a controversial Dutch healing medium
- Guusje Ter Horst (born 1952) a retired Dutch politician and psychologist
- Caroline van der Plas leader of the BBB political party and member of the house of Netherlands representatives since 2021.

=== The arts ===
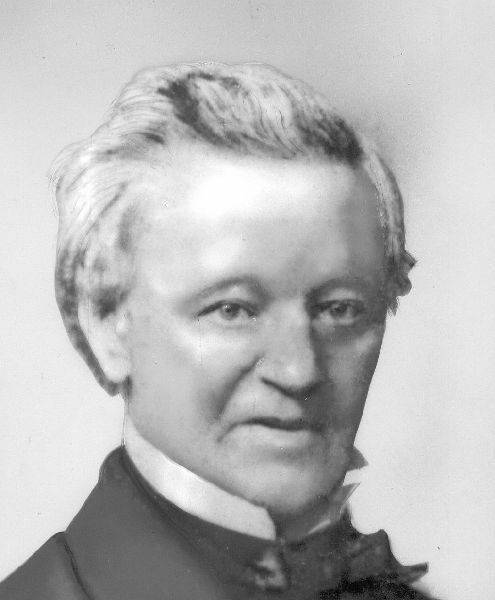
Justus Hiddes Halbertsma

- Jan Pieterszoon Sweelinck (1562–1621) a Dutch composer, organist and pedagogue
- Bartholomeus Breenbergh (1598–1657) a Dutch Golden Age painter of Italianate landscapes
- Gerard Ter Borch (1617–1681) a Dutch Golden Age genre painter
- Justus Hiddes Halbertsma (1789–1869) a Frisian writer, poet, minister and linguist
- Han van Meegeren (1889–1947) a Dutch painter, portraitist and art forger
- Truus Schröder-Schräder (1889–1985) a Dutch socialite, involved with avant-garde artists and architects of the De Stijl movement, lived in the Rietveld Schröder House
- Mannus Franken (1899–1953) a Dutch filmmaker, developed the Indonesian cinema
- Jan Kleinbussink (born 1946) a classical musician, cantor-organist of the Lebuïnus Church
- Pieter Jan Brugge (born 1955) a Dutch film producer
- Rob Voerman (born 1966) a Dutch graphic artist, sculptor and installation artist
- Clara Wildschut (1906-1950), a Dutch composer

=== Science & business ===
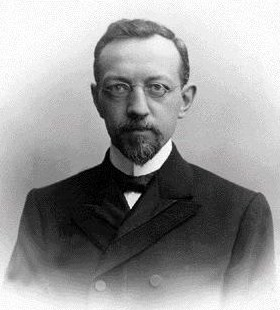
J.C.H. de Meijere

- Jacob van Deventer (ca. 1500 in Kampen – 1575) a Dutch cartographer of the Renaissance
- John Groenveldt M.D. (ca.1647-ca.1710) a physician, member of the Royal College of Physicians
- Willem ten Rhijne (1647–1700) a doctor and botanist with the Dutch East India Company
- Hendrik van Deventer M.D. (1651–1724), considered the world's foremost obstetrician and gynaecologist at the time
- Johannes C. H. de Meijere (1866–1947) a Dutch zoologist and entomologist
- Lourens Baas Becking (1895–1963) a Dutch botanist and microbiologist
- David de Wied (1925–2004) a Dutch professor of pharmacology at the University of Utrecht
- Hubert Schoemaker (1950–2006) a Dutch biotechnologist

=== Sport ===
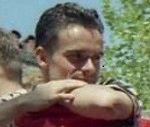
Marc Overmars, 1998

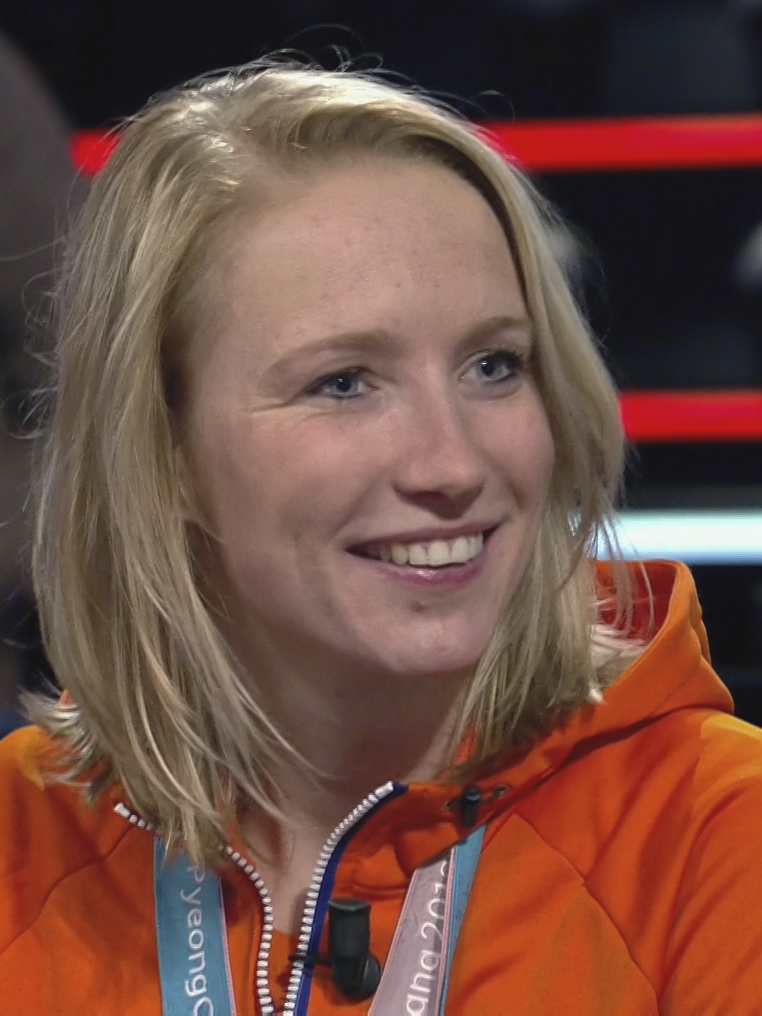
Carlijn Achtereekte, 2018

- Gerard le Heux (1885–1973) a horse rider, team bronze medallist at the 1928 Summer Olympics
- Jan Bultman (born 1942) a former water polo player, competed at the 1964 Summer Olympics
- Dick Schneider (born 1948) a retired Dutch footballer with over 500 club appearances
- Bert van Marwijk (born 1952) a Dutch former footballer with 468 club appearances and current manager
- Jan van Dijk (born 1956) a footballer with 465 club appearances with FC Groningen and current manager
- René Temmink (born 1960) a Dutch former football referee
- Gertjan Verbeek (born 1962) a Dutch former footballer with 285 club appearances and current manager
- Ron Dekker (born 1966) a breaststroke swimmer, competed at the 1988 Summer Olympics
- Jan Michels (born 1970) a Dutch footballer with over 400 club appearances
- Marc Overmars (born 1973) footballer with 399 club appearances, director of football at AFC Ajax
- Victor Sikora (born 1978) a Dutch football player with 330 club appearances
- Marloes Coenen (born 1981 in Olst) a retired Dutch mixed martial artist
- Boaz Meylink (born 1984) a Dutch rower, team bronze medallist at the 2016 Summer Olympics
- Bas Dost (born 1989) a Dutch professional footballer with over 300 club appearances
- Carlijn Achtereekte (born 1990) a long-distance speed skater, gold medallist at the 2018 Winter Olympics
- Elis Ligtlee (born 1994) a Dutch track cyclist, gold medallist at the 2016 Summer Olympics

== International relations ==
Deventer is twinned with four cities:

Arnsberg, Germany, (since 1956); London, Ontario, Canada	Sibiu, Romania, (since 2007); Tartu, Estonia

== Gallery ==
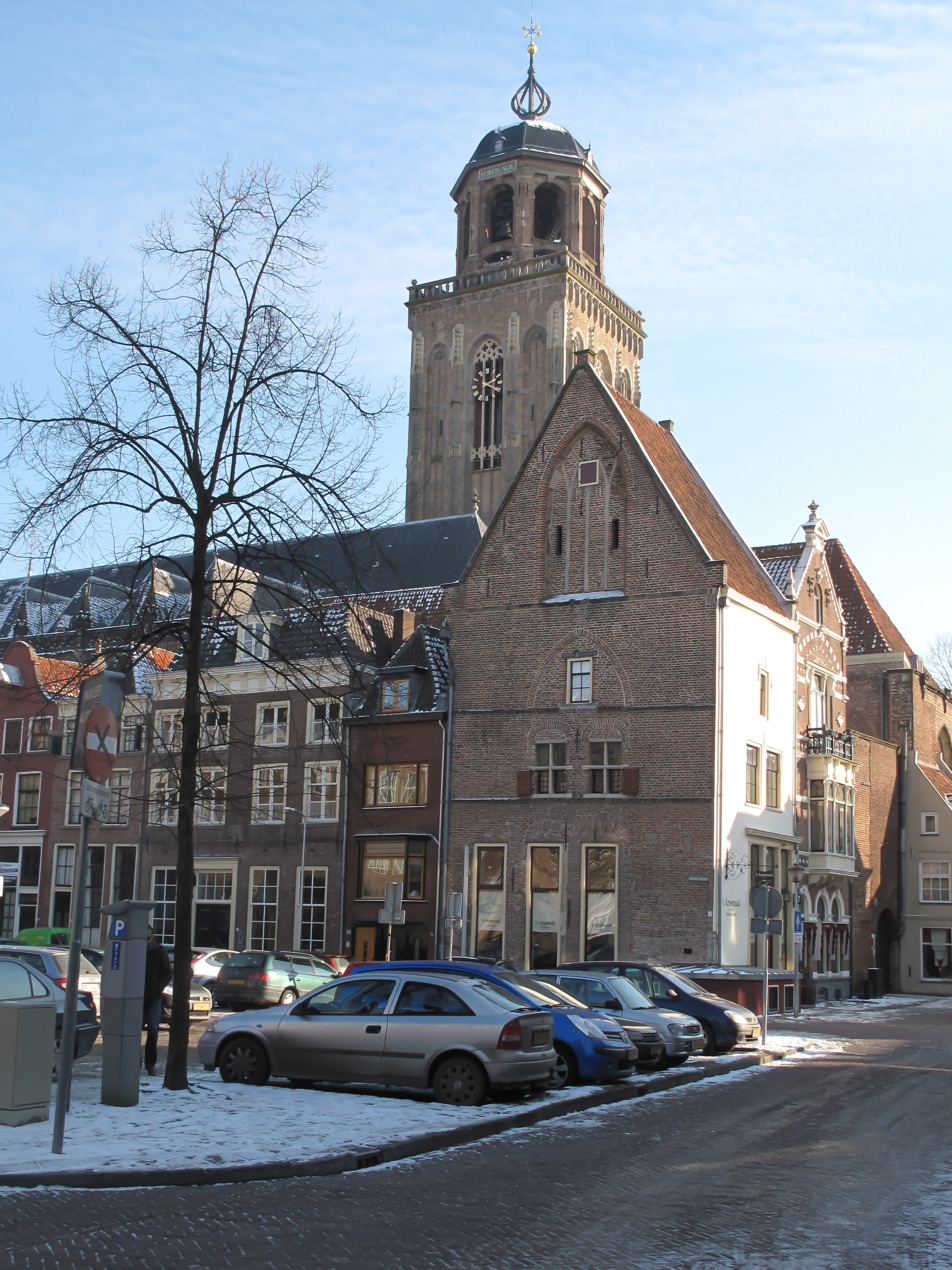
Tower of the St. Lebuinus Church

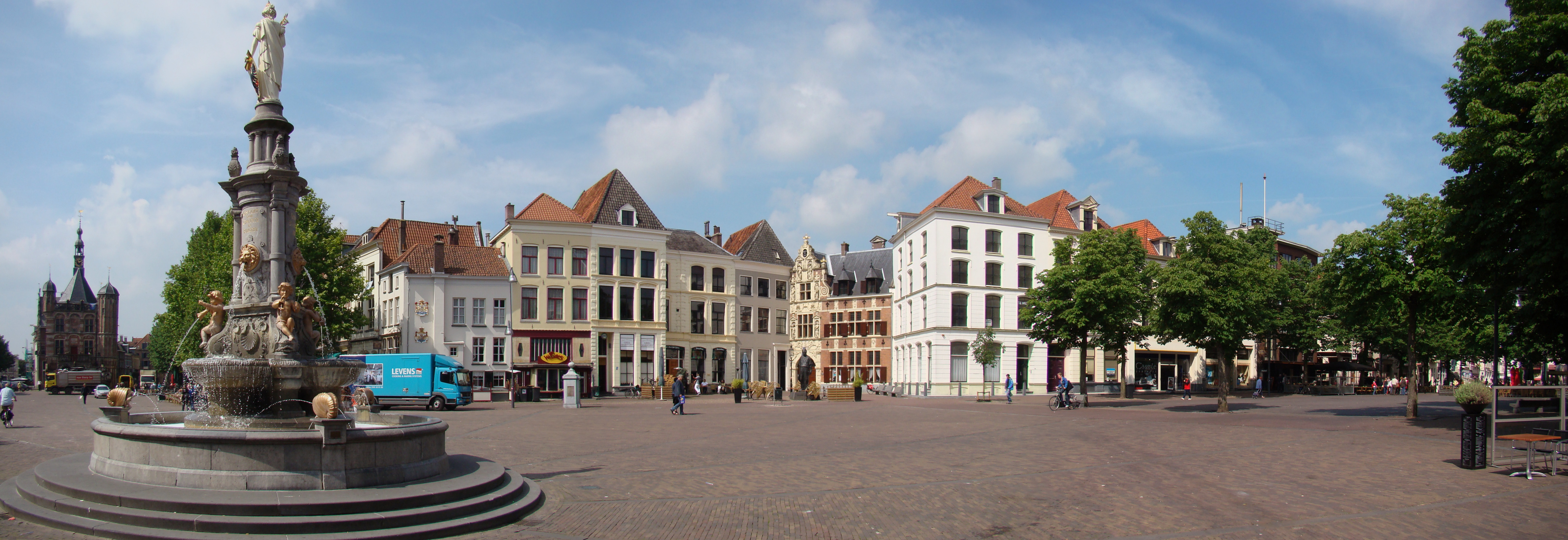
De Brink panorama

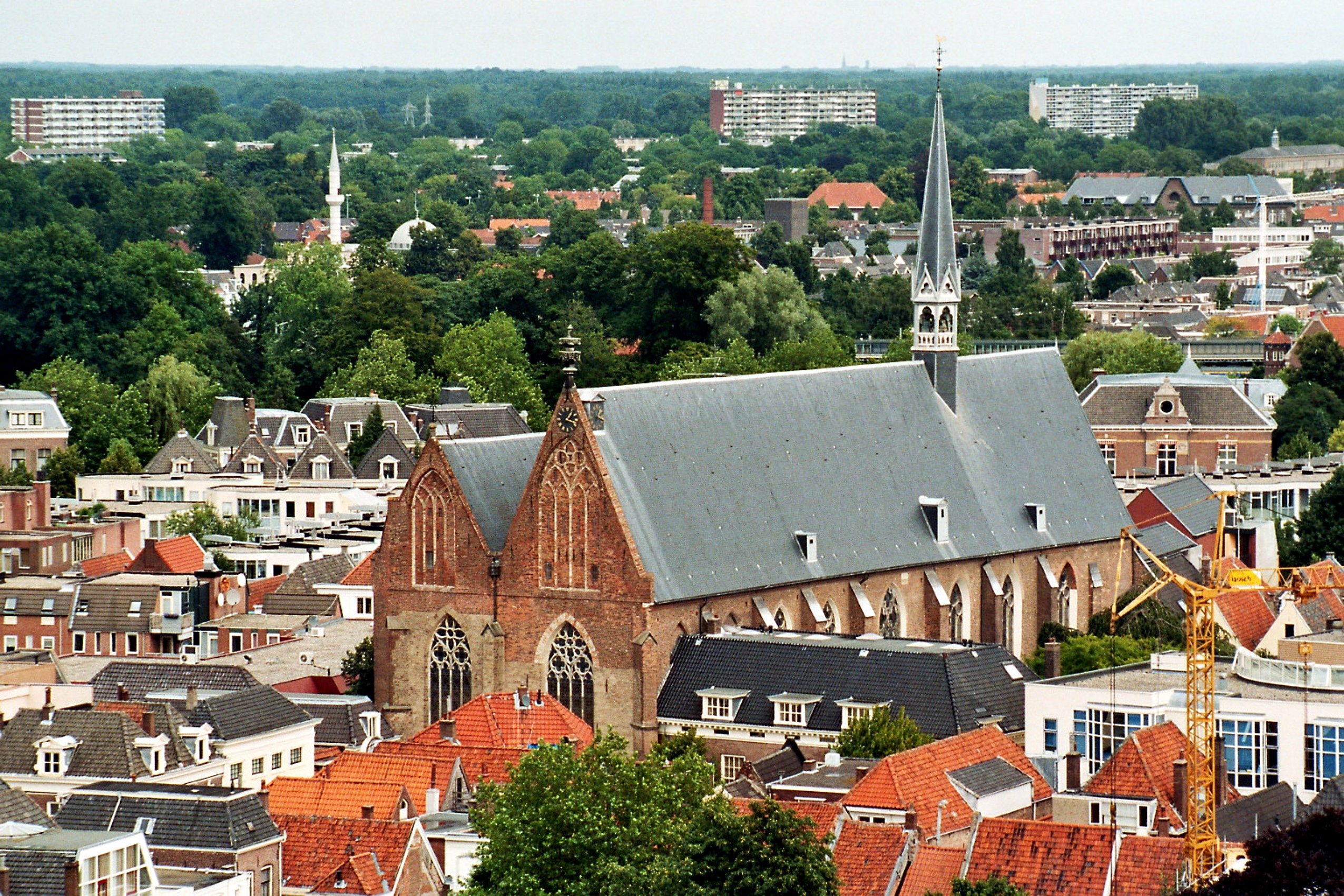
Aerial view of Broederenkerk

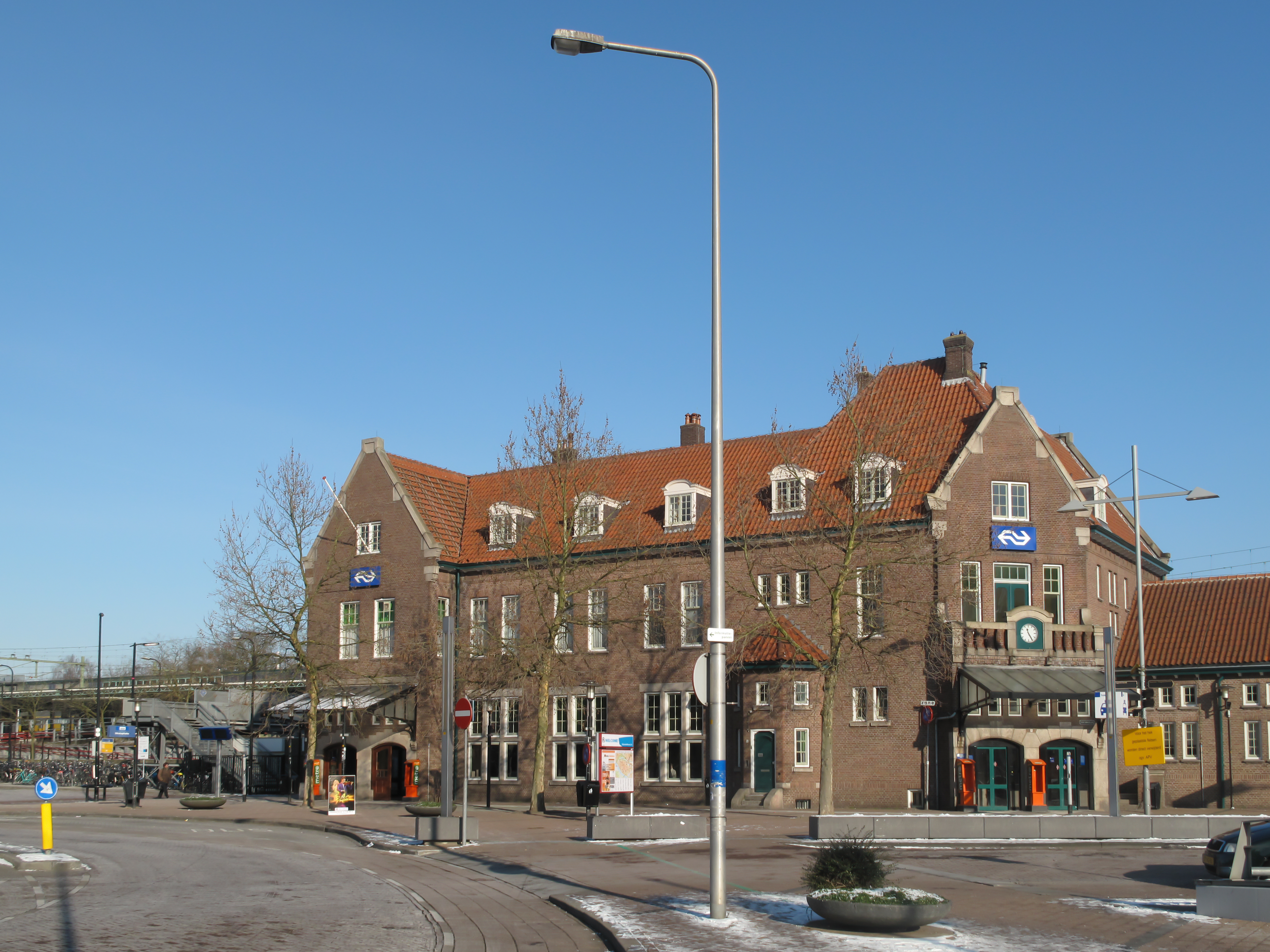
Deventer railway station

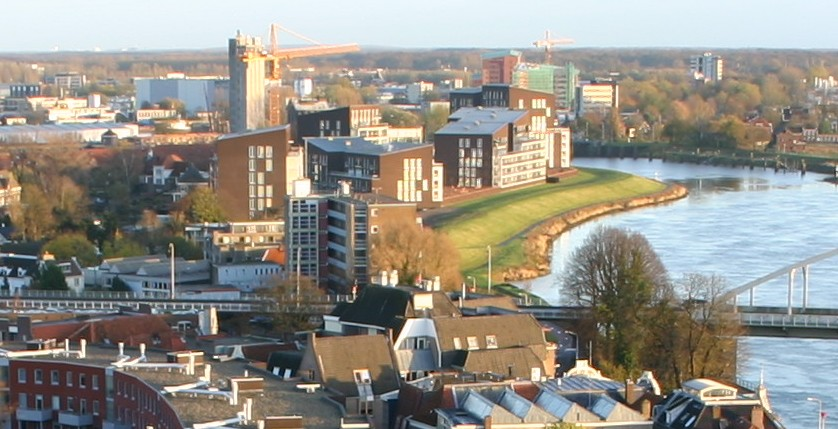
Pothoofd panorama

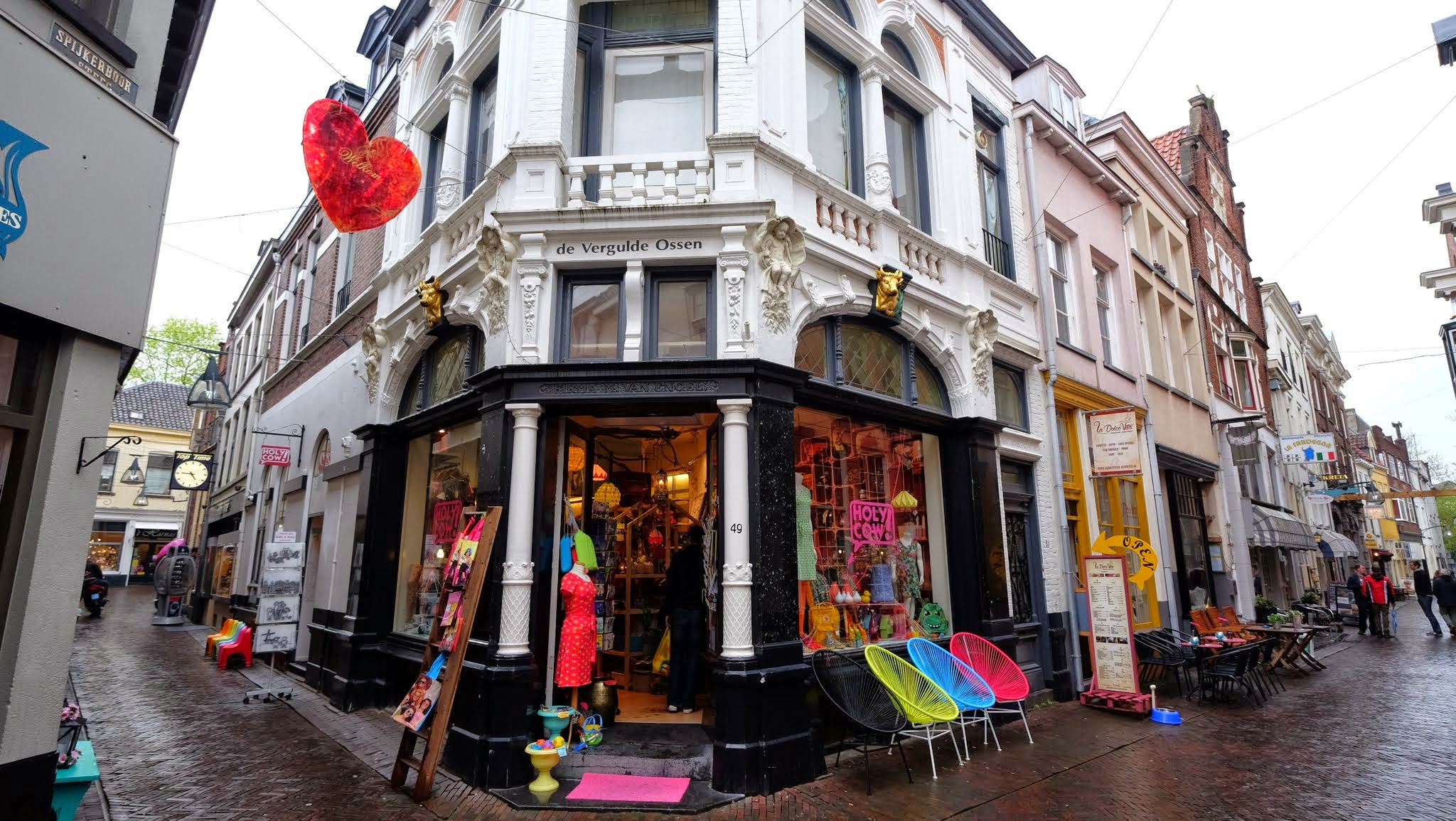
Panorama of Deventer city centre

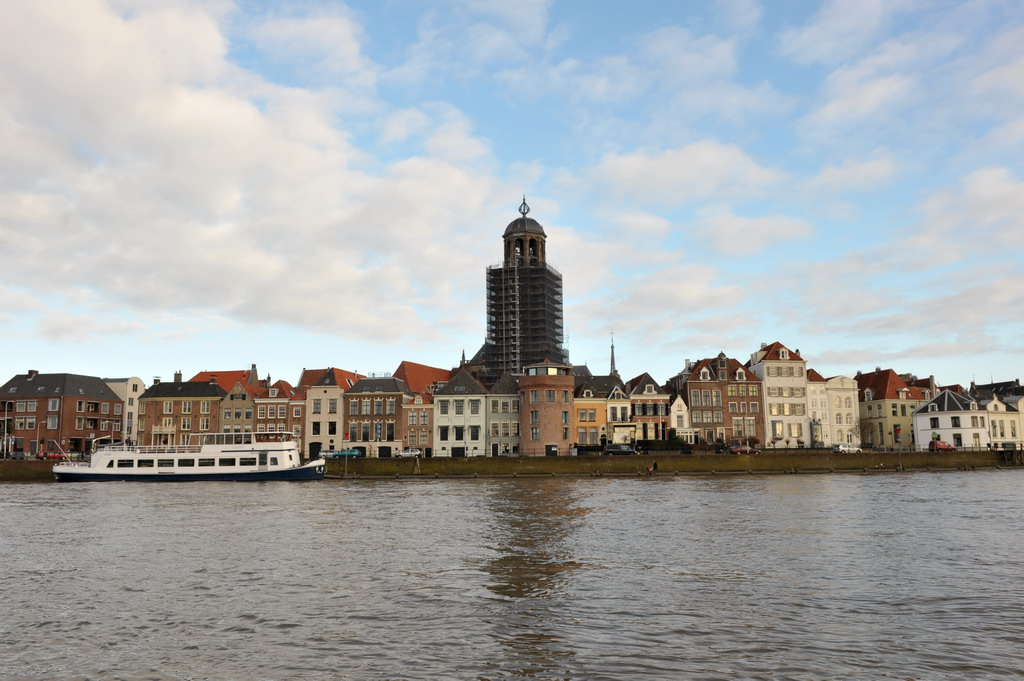
View of St. Lebuinus Church from the river

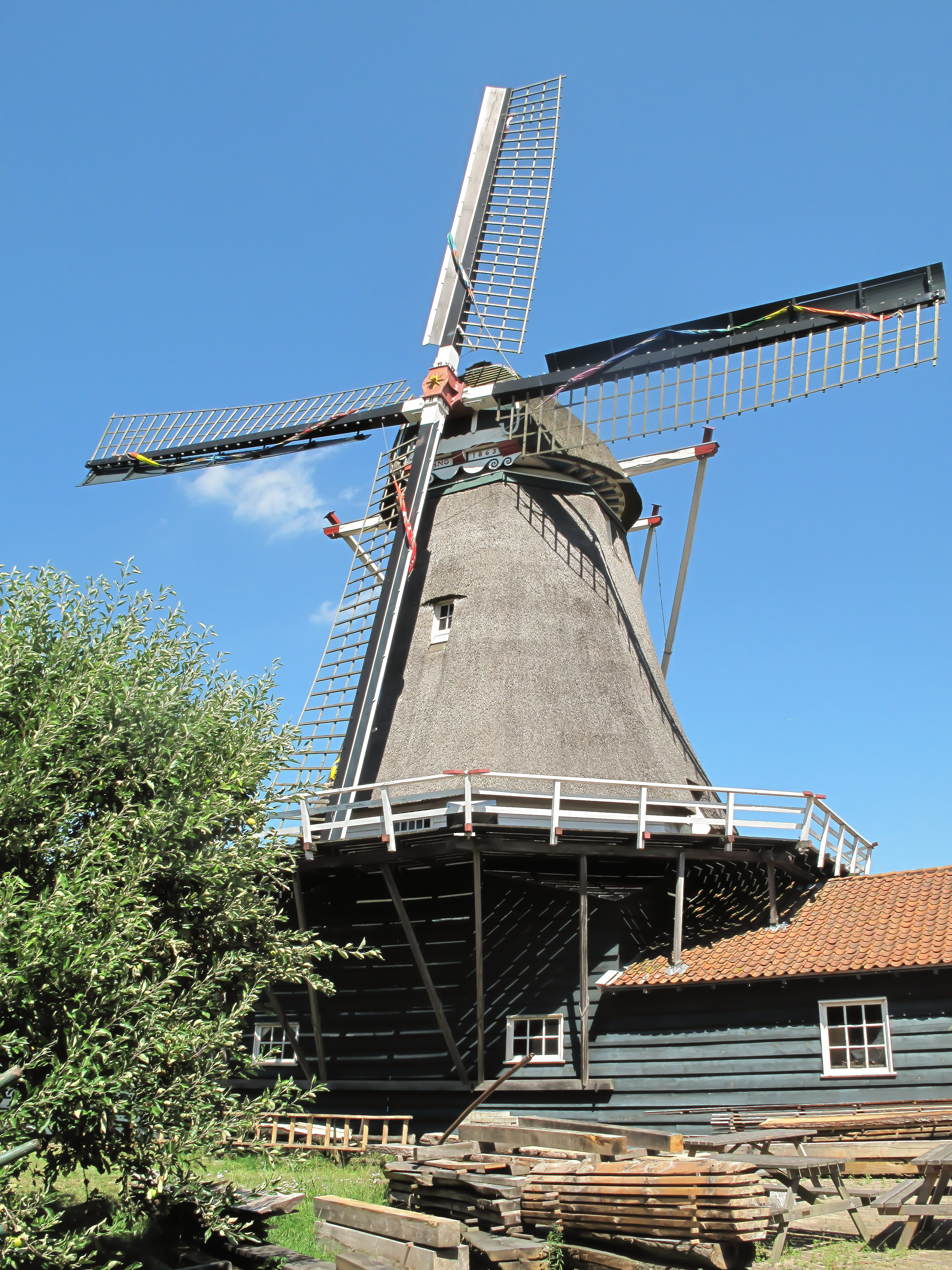
Bolwerksmolen windmill

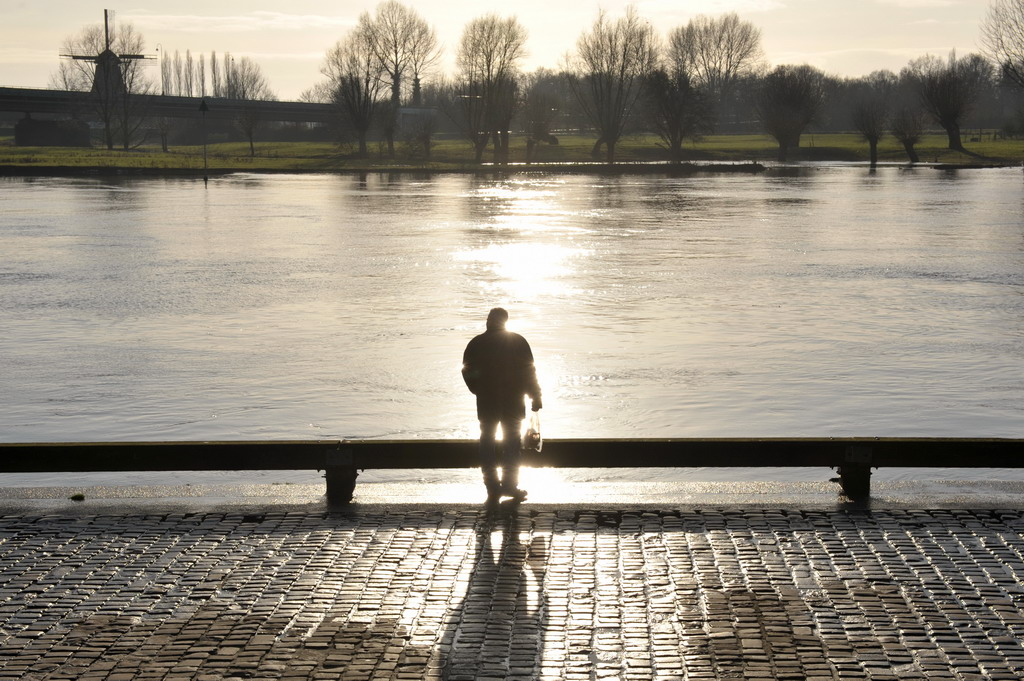
IJssel near Deventer, Wellekade

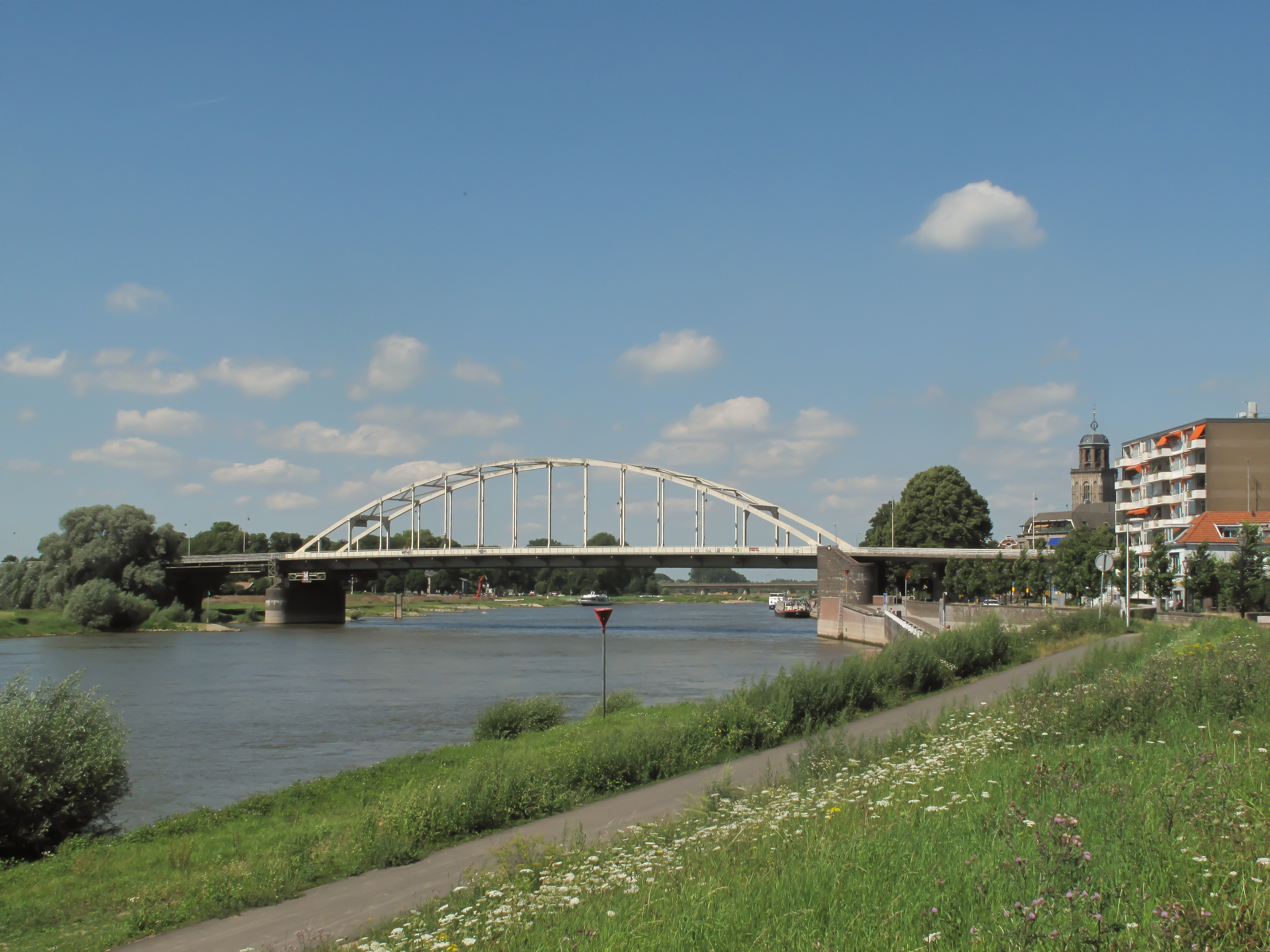
De Wilhelminabrug bridge
