= Arenda =

Arenda is a given name of the following notable people:

- Arenda Grimberg (born 1978), Dutch racing cyclist
- Arenda Haasnoot (born 1973), Dutch theologian and preacher
- Arenda Troutman (born 1957), American politician
- Arenda Wright Allen (born 1960), American judge

== See also ==
- 1502 Arenda, a minor planet named after the Belgian astronomer Sylvain Arend
- Arend (given name)
