= Voorst-Empe railway station =

Railway station in Voorst and Empe, the Netherlands

Voorst-Empe
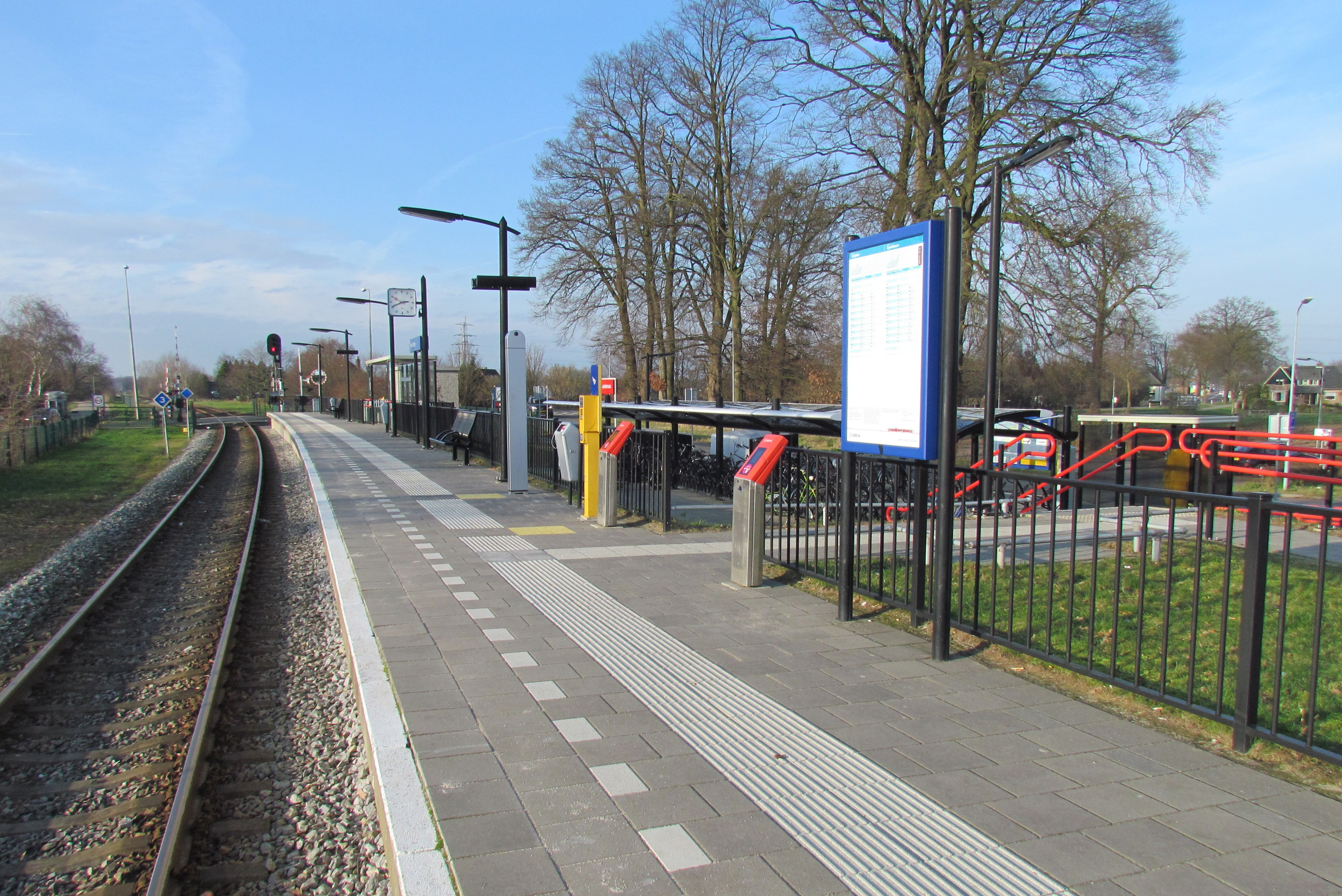
- Voorst-Empe railway station in 2014

General information
- Location: Brummen, Netherlands
- Coordinates: 52°9′28″N 6°8′34″E
- Line: Amsterdam–Zutphen railway

History
- Opened: 1876, reopened 2006
- Closed: 1938

Services
Preceding station	Arriva Netherlands	Following station
Klarenbeek towards Apeldoorn	Stoptrein 17800	Zutphen Terminus
Location
- Location within Netherlands

Voorst-Empe is a railway station serving the villages Voorst and Empe in the Netherlands. The station was opened in 1876 (as Voorst), closed in 1938 and reopened in 2006. It is located on the Amsterdam–Zutphen railway, between Apeldoorn and Zutphen. The train services are operated by Arriva.

== Train services ==
The following services currently call at Voorst-Empe:

- 2x per hour local services (stoptrein) Apeldoorn - Zutphen
