= Empe =

- Village
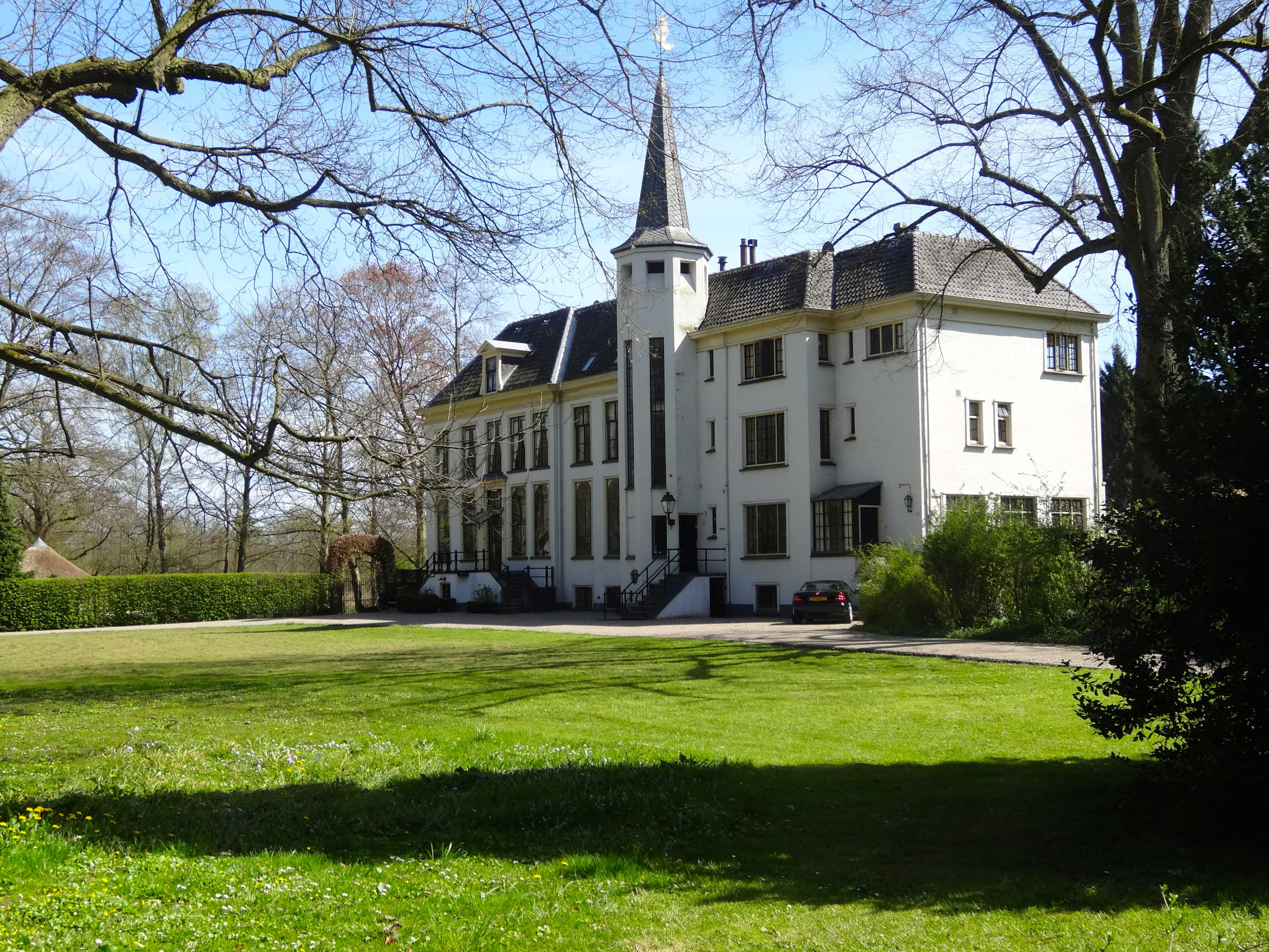
- Huis Empe

- Location in the province of Gelderland in the Netherlands Empe (Netherlands)
- Coordinates: 52°9′N 6°8′E
- Country: Netherlands
- Province: Gelderland
- Municipality: Brummen

Area
  - Total: 6.51 km^{2} (2.51 sq mi)
- Elevation: 8 m (26 ft)

Population (2021)
  - Total: 580
  - Density: 89/km^{2} (230/sq mi)
- Time zone: UTC+1 (CET)
  - Summer (DST): UTC+2 (CEST)
- Postal code: 7399
- Dialing code: 0575

Empe is a village in the municipality of Brummen in the province of Gelderland in the Netherlands. Empe is located on the Apeldoorn-Zutphen railway, 4 km west of Zutphen. The NS railway station Voorst-Empe was reopened on 10 December 2006. The castle Huis Empe, built around 1550 lies on the edge of the village.

== History ==
The village was first mentioned in 1046 as Suthempe. The etymology is unknown. The oldest forms have Sut (south) as prefix to distinguish between Noord-Empe.

The manor house Huis Empe was built around 1550. In 1710, it was bought by Thomas van Buerlo, mayor of Zutphen, and would remain in the family. It was redesigned in 1825 in neoclassic style. The south and the west wing were significantly altered in 1930. In late 1950, the east wing was turned into a clergy house. In 1983, the foundation Stichting Huis Empe was established to preserve the estate. It is currently used as residential houses.

Empe was home to 544 people in 1840. A joint railway station with Voorst opened in 1876 on the Amsterdam to Zutphen railway line. It closed in 1938. It was briefly in operation between 25 September 1940 and 5 May 1941. The building was demolished in 1946. In 2006, it reopened again.

== Notable people ==
- Dick Dolman (1935-2019), politician, member of parliament 1970-1990
- Stefan Groothuis (b. 1981), speed skater

== Gallery ==
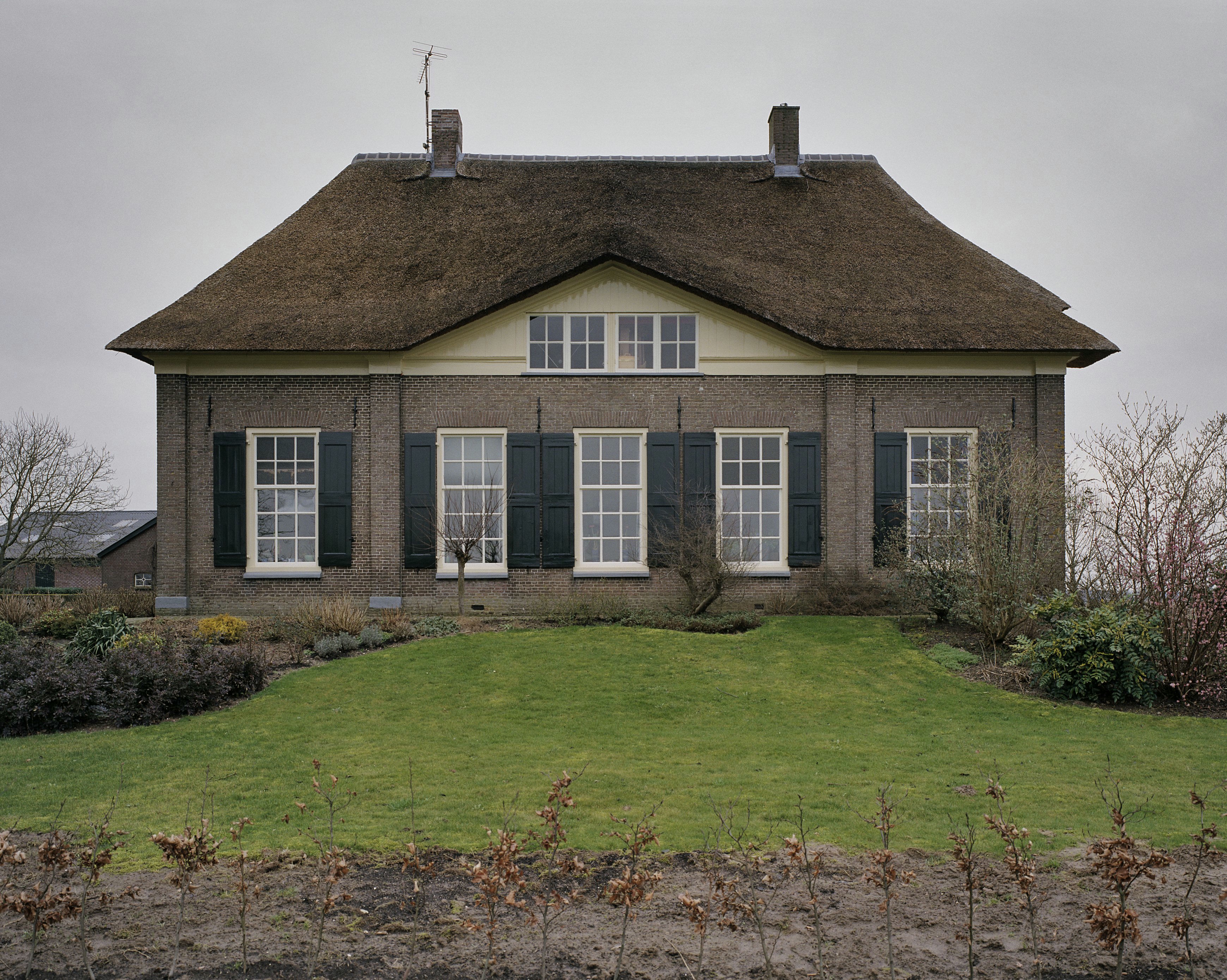
Farm in Empe

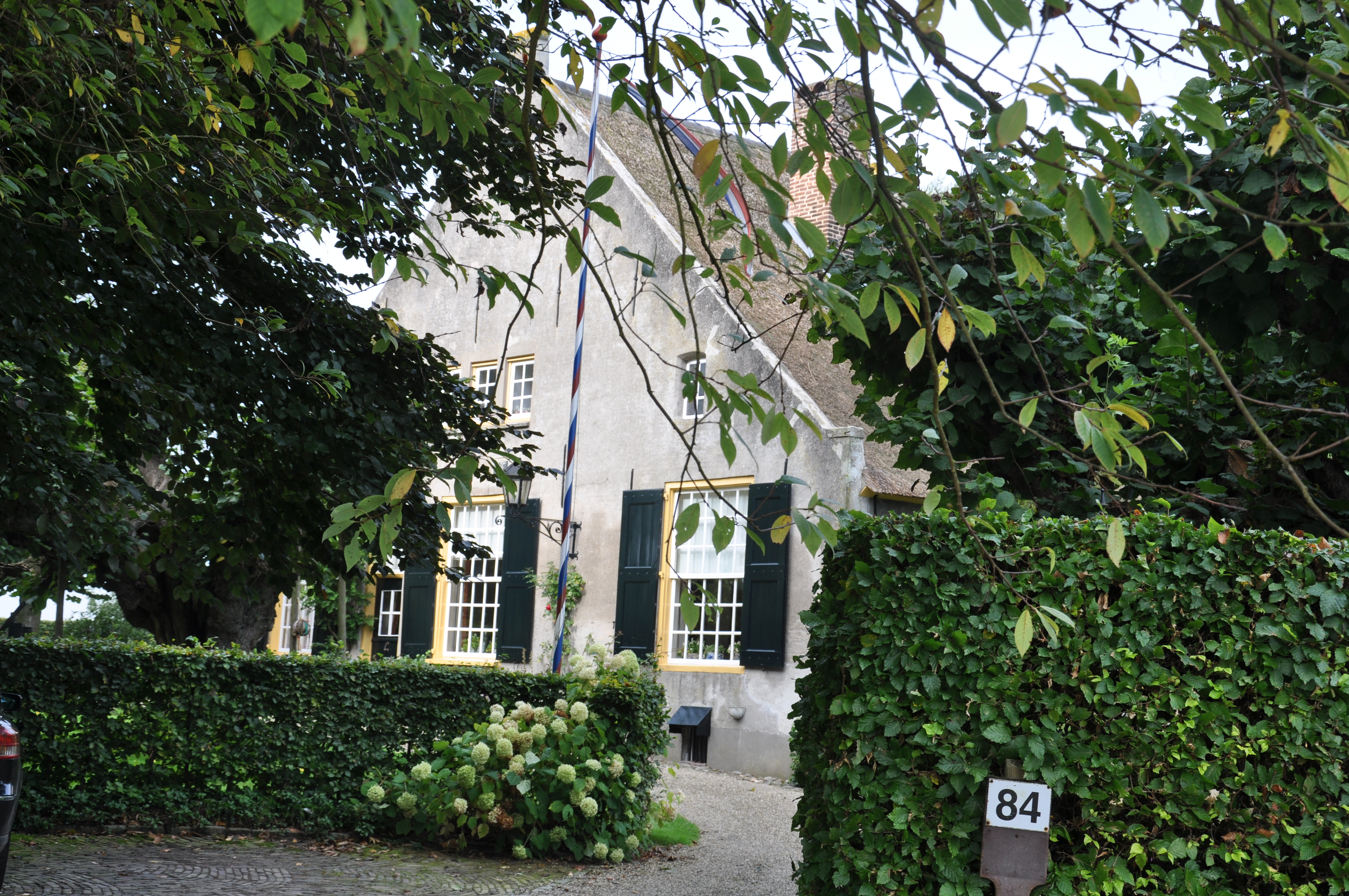
Farm in Empe

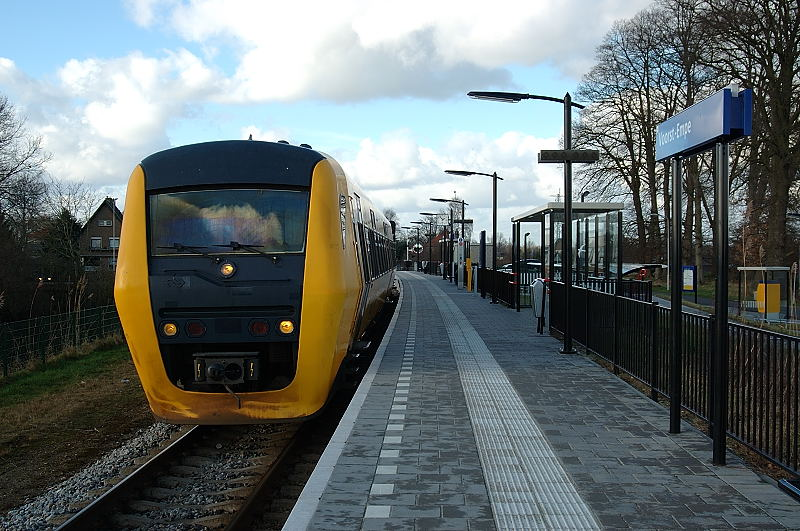
Voorst-Empe railway station

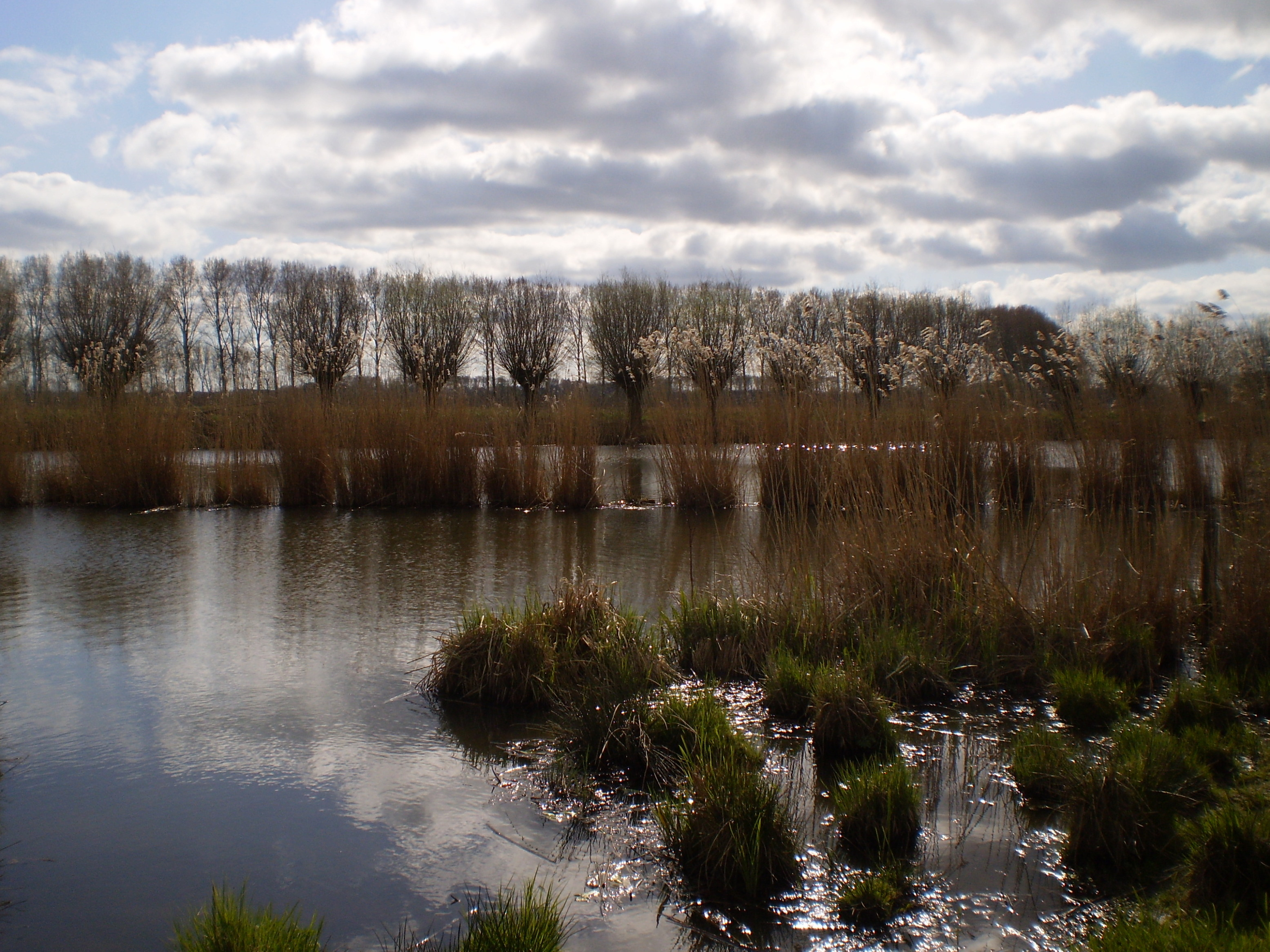
Oude IJssel near Empe
