= Appen, Netherlands =

Appen
- Hamlet
- Location in the Netherlands Appen (Netherlands)
- Coordinates: 52°10′54″N 6°7′45″E
- Country: Netherlands
- Province: Gelderland
- Municipality: Voorst

Area
  - Total: 5.67 km^{2} (2.19 sq mi)
- Elevation: 8 m (26 ft)

Population (2021)
  - Total: 50
  - Density: 8.8/km^{2} (23/sq mi)
- Time zone: UTC+1 (CET)
  - Summer (DST): UTC+2 (CEST)
- Postal code: 7383
- Dialing code: 0575

Appen (Dutch pronunciation: [ˈɑpə(n)]) is a hamlet in the Dutch province of Gelderland. It is located in the municipality of Voorst, about 0.5 km southwest of Gietelo, to which it belongs.

It was first mentioned in 1299 as Appenses. The etymology is unknown. The postal authorities have placed it under Voorst. In 1840, it was home to 808 people. Nowadays, it consists of about 20 houses.
