= Johannes Gijsbertus Bastiaans =

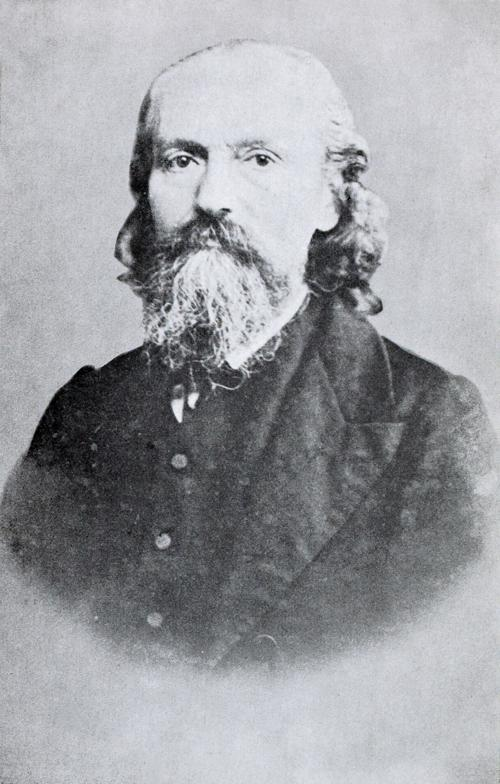
Johannes Gijsbertus Bastiaans

Johannes Gijsbertus Bastiaans (31 October 1812 in Wilp – 16 February 1875 in Haarlem) was a Dutch organist, composer and music theorist. Bastiaans was educated in organ playing from the age of ten in Deventer. He studied to become a watchmaker and settled in Rotterdam. There he meet C.F. Hommert, who introduced him to the works of Johann Sebastian Bach.

He moved to Germany where he studied with amongst others Felix Mendelssohn-Bartholdy and F. Becker. In 1839 he became organist for the Mennonite congregation in Deventer. In 1840 he became organist at the Zuiderkerk in Amsterdam, and between 1858 and 1878 he was cityorganist at the Grote Kerk in Haarlem.

He was one of the driving forces behind the growing attention for J.S. Bach in the Netherlands. Bastiaans wrote several chorales and works for the organ and piano. He also wrote several melodies for the church book Vervolgbundel op de Evangelische Gezangen. The church song book Liedboek voor de Kerken lists 9 songs that are accompanied by his melodies.
