= Klarenbeek railway station =

Railway station in the Netherlands

Klarenbeek
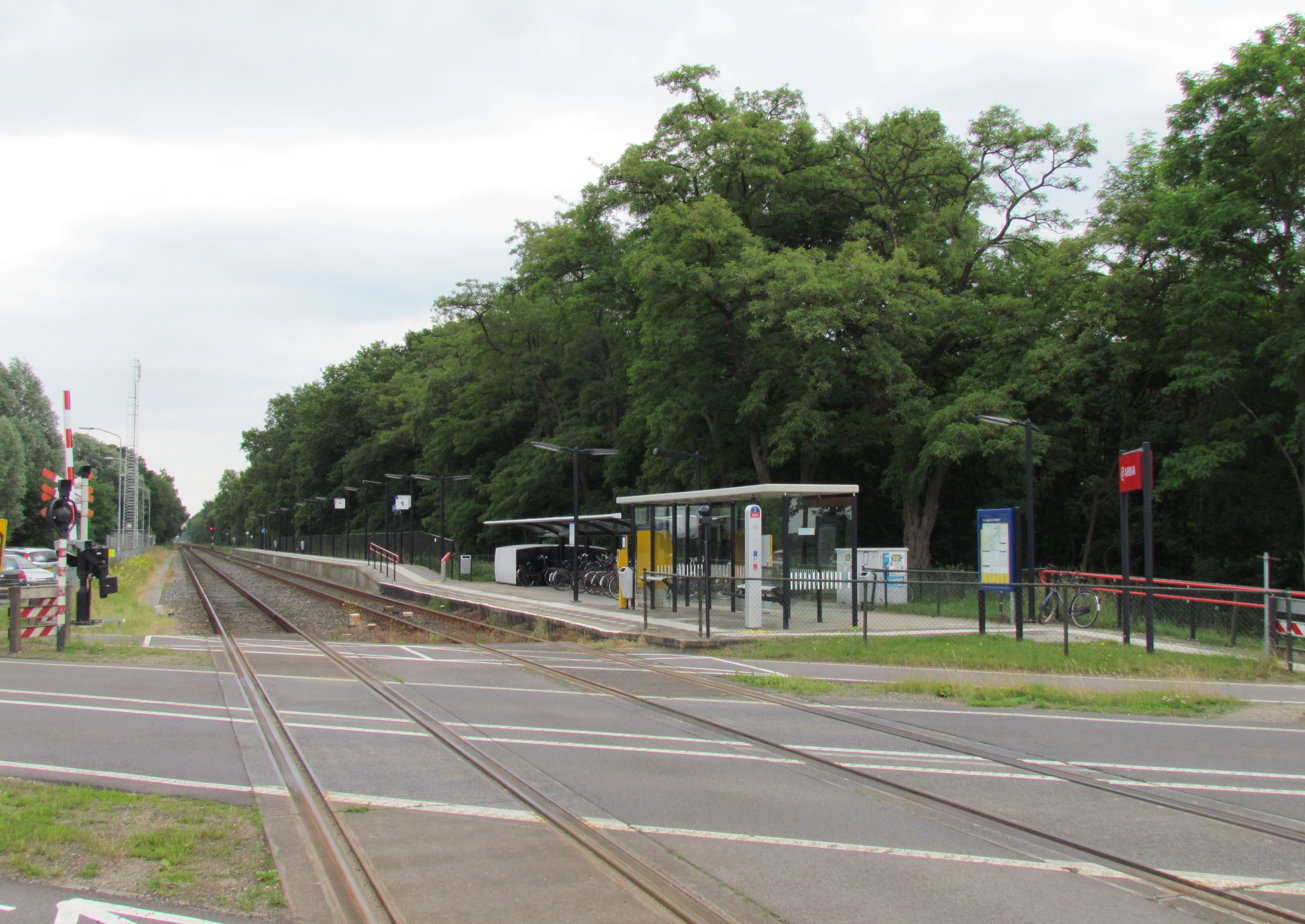

General information
- Location: Netherlands
- Coordinates: 52°10′40″N 6°5′3″E
- Line: Amsterdam–Zutphen railway

History
- Opened: 1882

Services
Preceding station	Arriva Netherlands	Following station
Apeldoorn De Maten towards Apeldoorn	Stoptrein 17800	Voorst-Empe towards Zutphen
Location
- Location within Netherlands

Klarenbeek is a railway station, located in Klarenbeek, Netherlands. The station opened on 1 June 1882 and is on the Amsterdam–Zutphen railway (Oosterspoorweg). The station is actually 2 km north-east of Klarenbeek. The station was originally only built because the line between Apeldoorn and Zutphen was single track, a passing point was needed, this was here. Until December 2006, the station had just 1 platform and one train each way per hour stopped at the station, allowing the other to pass. In December 2006, when 2 more new stations were built on the line, the station received 2 platforms. The train services are operated by Arriva.

== Tourism ==
The station is the beginning point for many walks in the area, many people start their journey at the station to see the famous country-side. The Dutch Railways offers many walks in this area via their magazine which is sent to all their customers around The Netherlands.

== Train service ==
The following services call at Klarenbeek:

- 2x per hour local services (stoptrein) Apeldoorn – Zutphen

== Bus service ==
- 508 Klarenbeek Station – Klarenbeek – Klein Amsterdam – Empe – Voorst-Empe Station operates 1x per hour (Monday to Saturday) and is operated by Syntus.
