= Nijbroek =

- Village
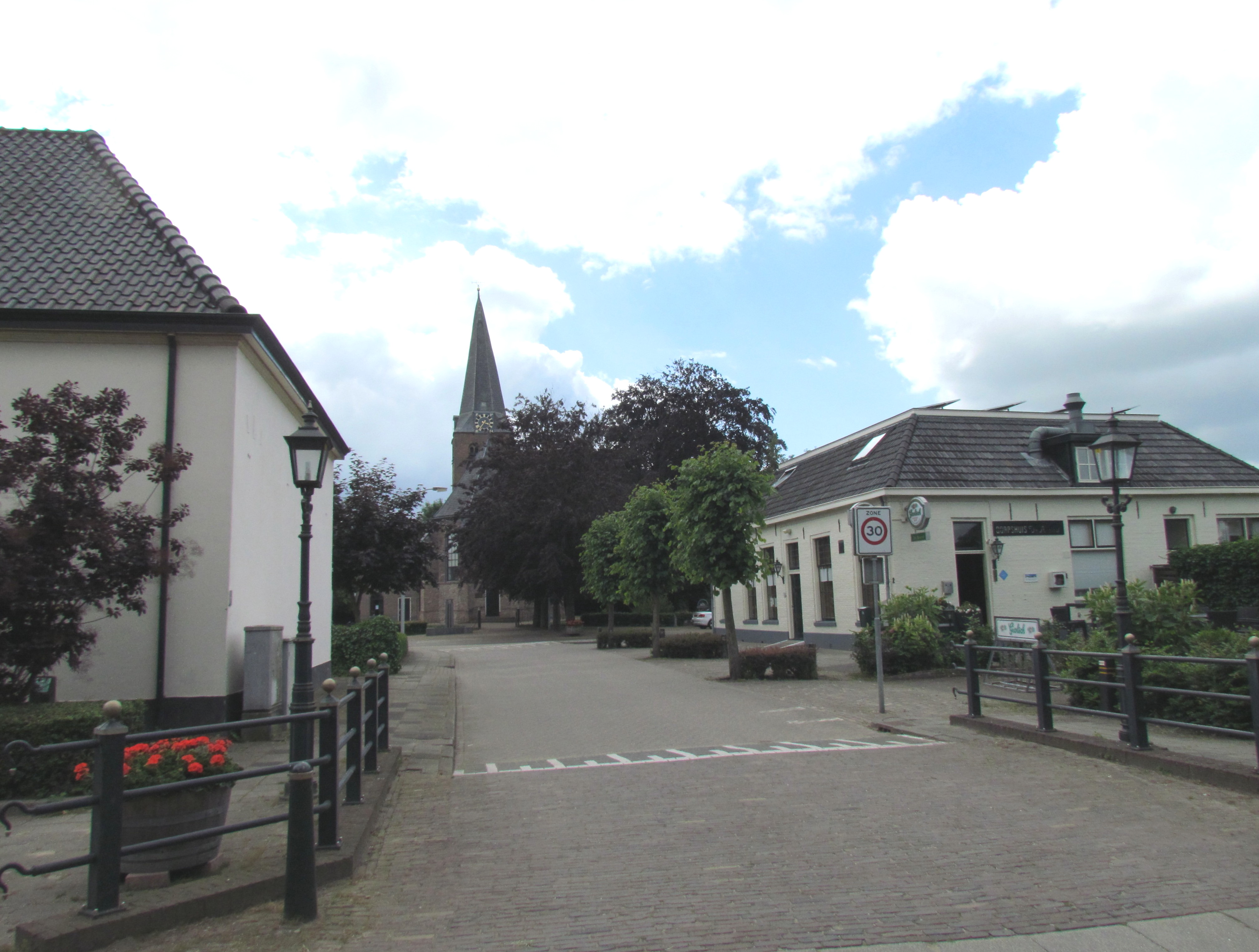
- Street view

- Coat of arms

- Location in the Netherlands Nijbroek (Netherlands)
- Coordinates: 52°17′34″N 6°3′45″E
- Country: Netherlands
- Province: Gelderland
- Municipality: Voorst

Area
  - Total: 20.16 km^{2} (7.78 sq mi)
- Elevation: 4 m (13 ft)

Population (2021)
  - Total: 930
  - Density: 46/km^{2} (120/sq mi)
- Time zone: UTC+1 (CET)
  - Summer (DST): UTC+2 (CEST)
- Postal code: 7397
- Dialing code: 0571

Nijbroek is a village in the Dutch province of Gelderland. It is located in the municipality of Voorst, about 12 km northeast of Apeldoorn.

Nijbroek was a separate municipality until 1818, when it was merged with Voorst.

== History ==
It was first mentioned in 1328 as Niebroeck, and means "new swampy land". In 1328, Reginald II, Duke of Guelders ordered the cultivation and poldering of the area. In 1339, the village became a parish. A church was in the 14th century, and the tower was enlarged in the 16th century. Fransenburg was built in the 14th century as a monastery. It is named after Frans van Apeldoorn who became the proprietor in 1658 and turned it into a castle. The castle was demolished before 1810. In 1840, Nijbroek was home to 713 people.

== Gallery ==
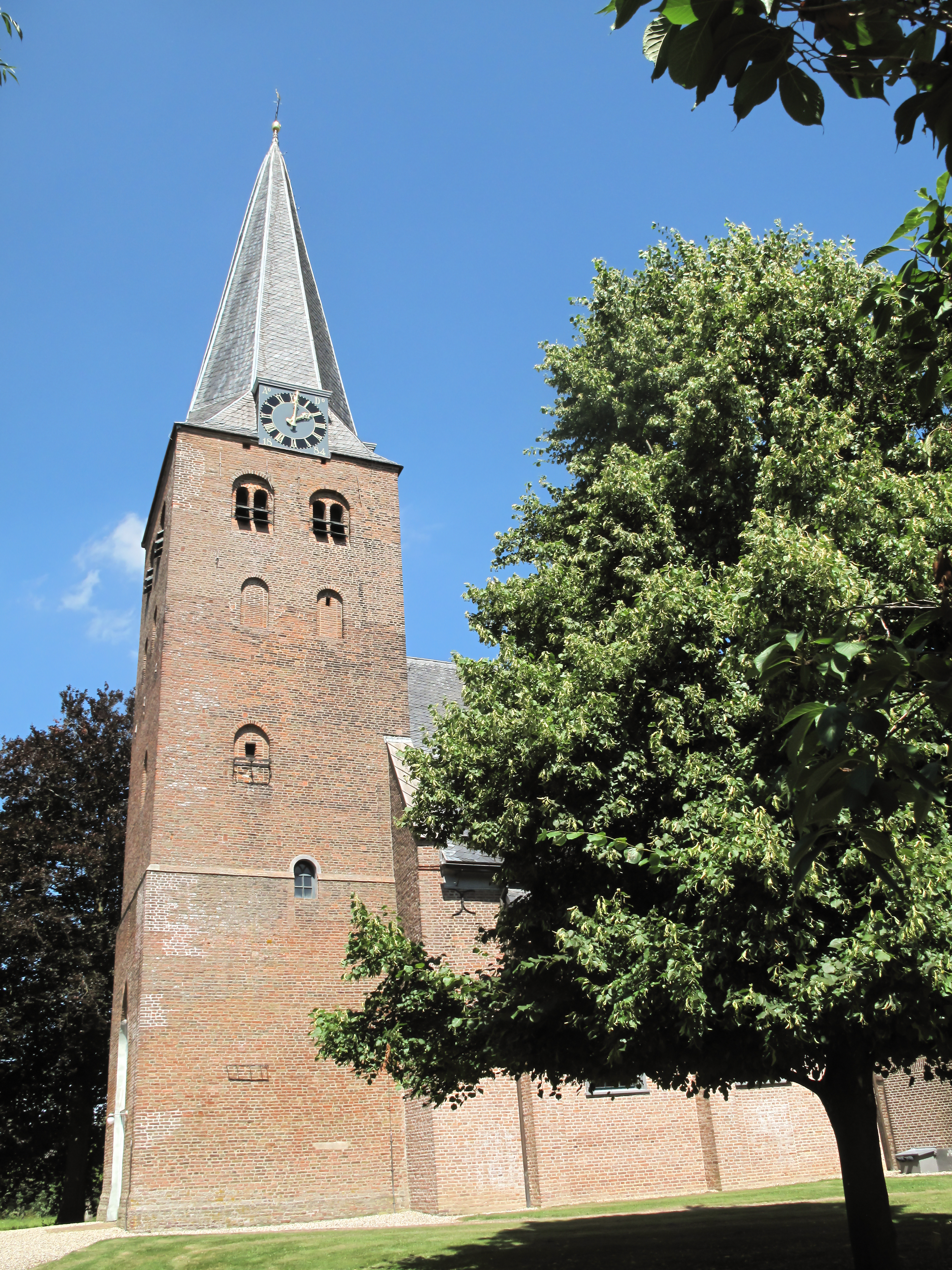
Reformed church in Nijbroek

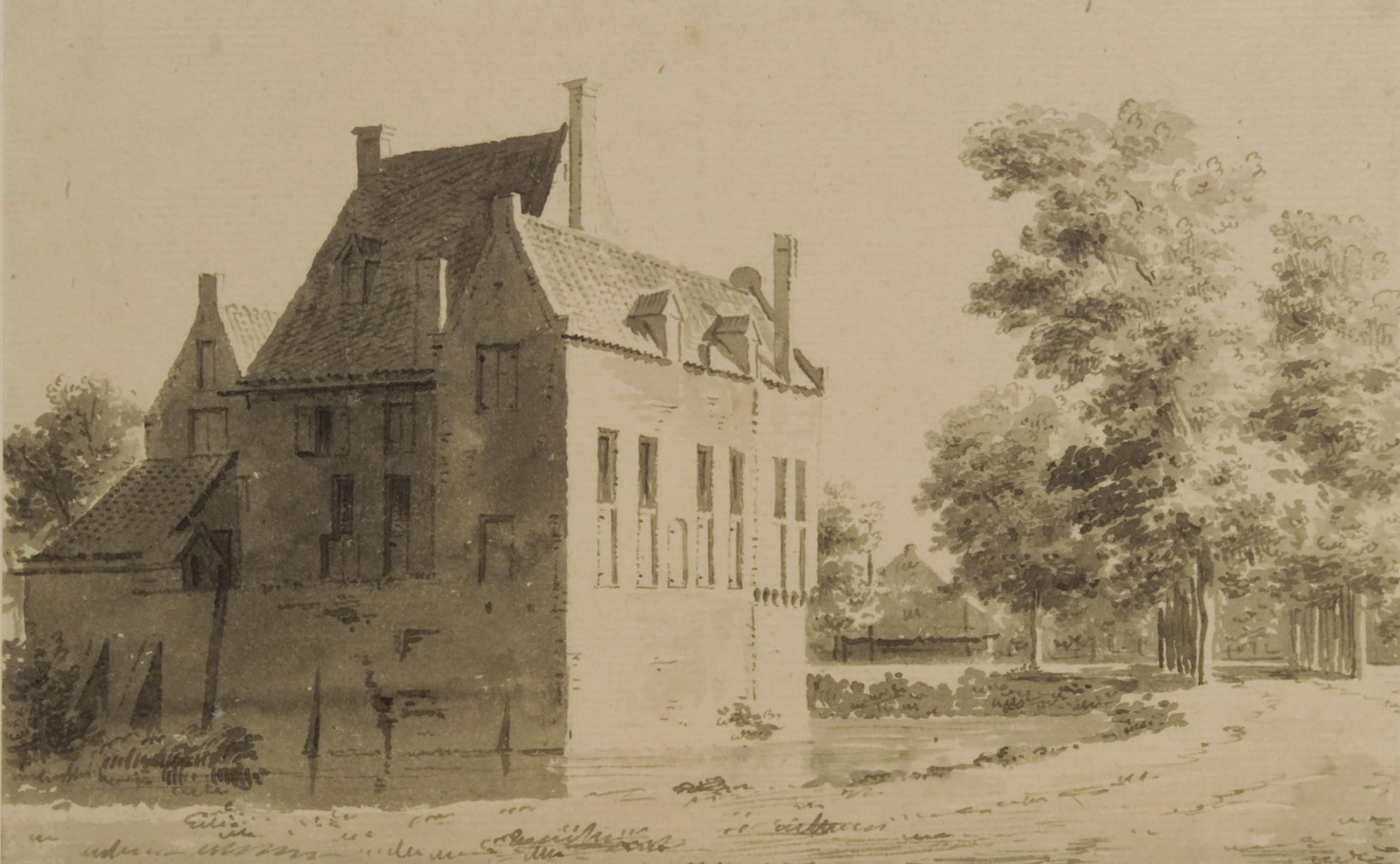
Fransenburg

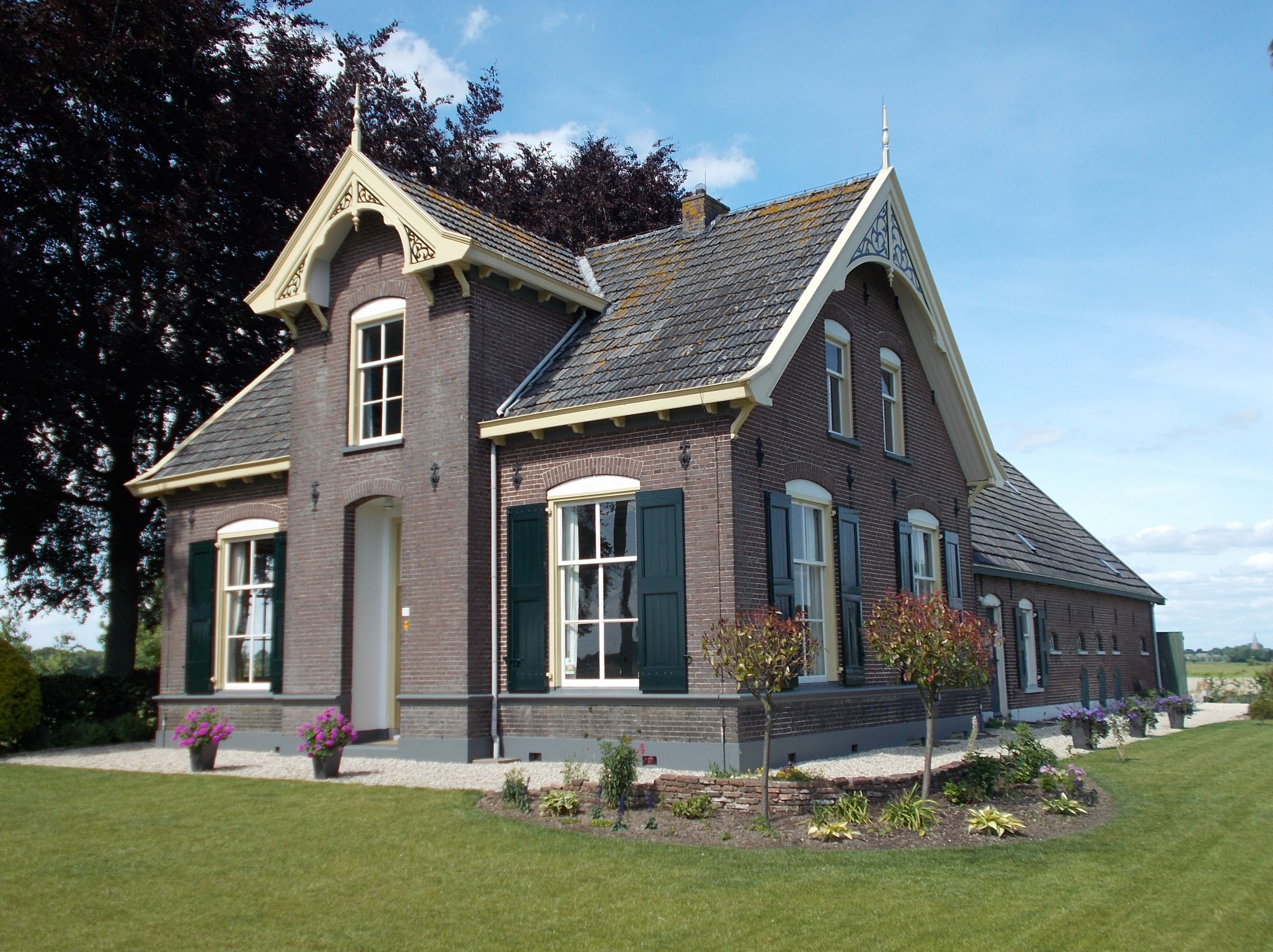
Farm in Nijbroek

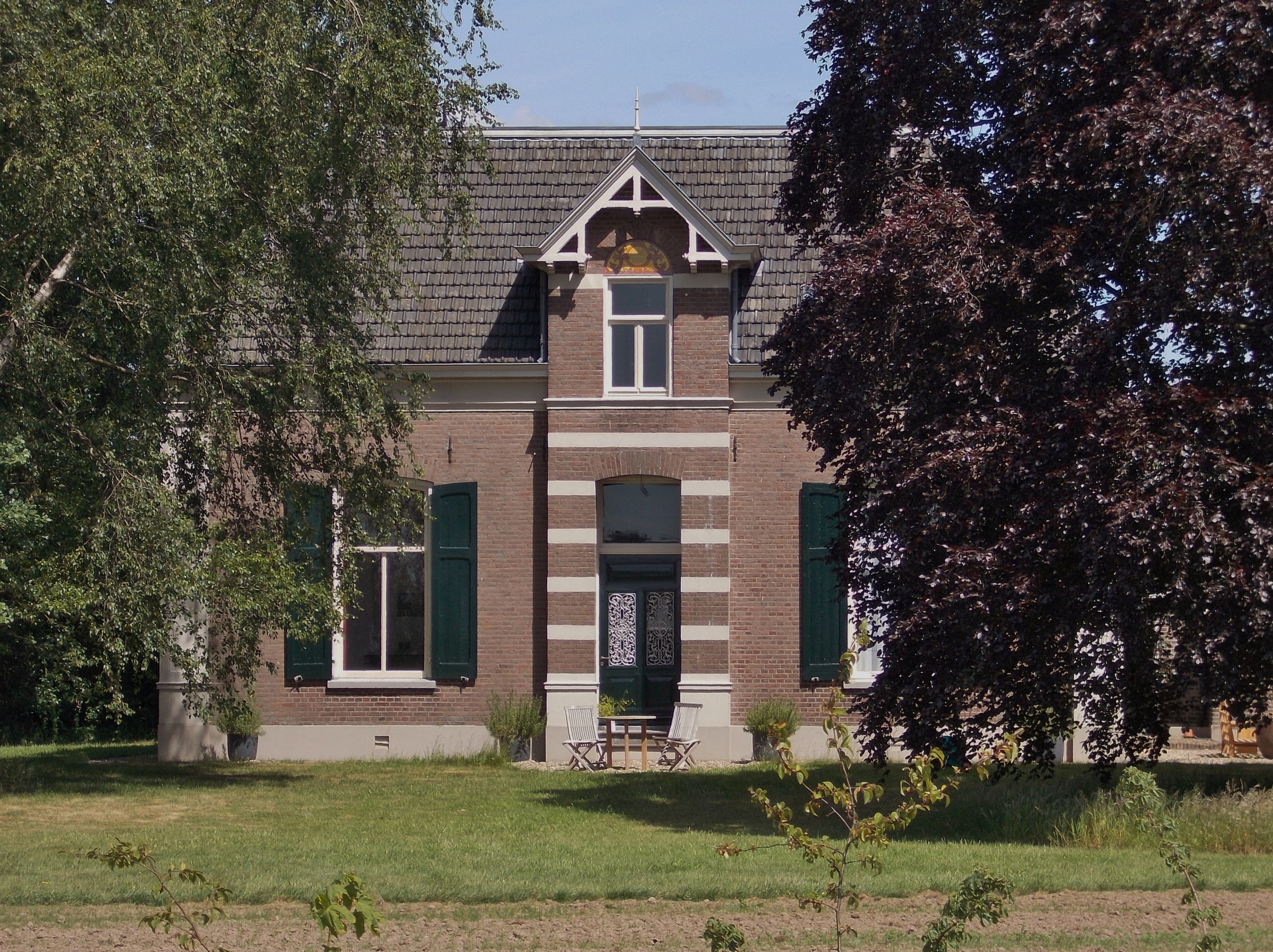
Villa in Nijbroek
