= Arenda Haasnoot =

Dutch theologian

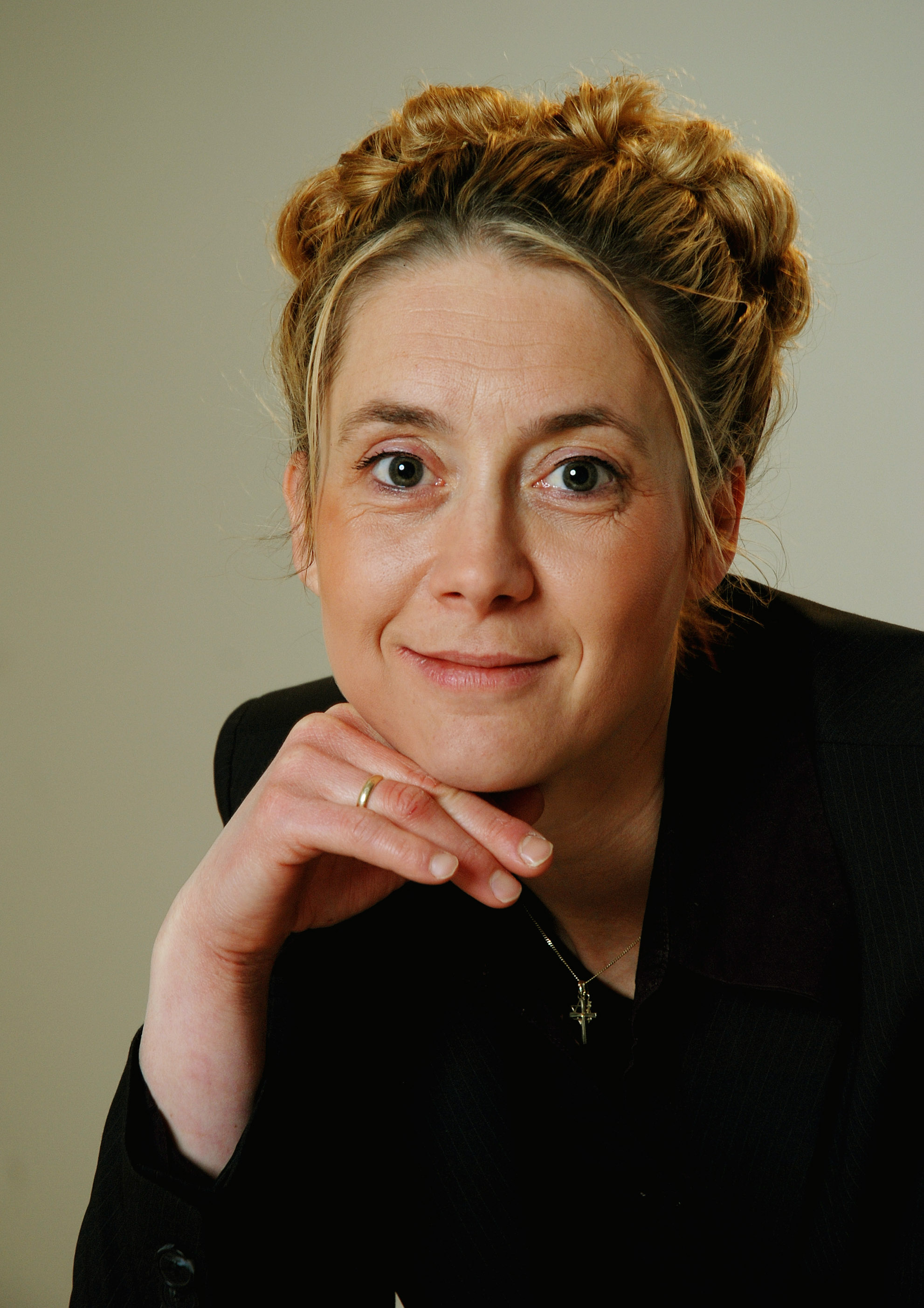
- Arenda Haasnoot, c. 2011
- Born: 28 March 1973 (age 53); Leiden, Netherlands
- Occupations: Theologian, preacher
- Employer: Protestant Church in the Netherlands (PKN)
- Spouse: Jeroen Tiggelman
- Children: 5

Arenda Haasnoot (born 28 March 1973) is a Dutch theologian and preacher in the Protestant Church in the Netherlands (PKN). From 2007 to 2010 she was the Vice Chairman of the General Synod, the supreme governing body of the PKN. She is currently preacher at the Reformed Church, Rijnsburg.

Haasnoot has published a book titled Neem je plaats in meaning "Take your place" in which she has explained her personal quest for the place which God has ordained her. She tells people to attend church, giving practical guidelines.

== Early life and education ==
Haasnoot was born on 28 March 1973 in Leiden, Netherlands. She grew up in Katwijk in a religious family. After attending the local grammar school, she studied and trained to be a nurse but subsequently studied theology from 1993 to 1995 at the University of Leiden. In 2002 she successfully studied for her doctorate in theology at the University of Amsterdam.

== Clergy career ==
Haasnoot started her religious career in 2000 as a trainee minister at the Reformed Church of The Hague-East. From 2001 to 2003 as a member of the clergy, she worked at the Reformed Church of 's Gravenmoer (sharing the task with her husband) and as a consultant at the Protestant Church Dongen-Rijen during 2003–2004. Between 2004 and 2012 she worked for the Reformed Church of Geldermalsen.

She also held positions such as member of the General Synod from 2005–2007, Board member St. Evangelical Werkverband during 2006–2007, Vice-president of the General Synod of the Protestant Church in the Netherlands from 2007 to 2011, Board member of Alpha Course Netherlands from 2009 and also currently its chairman. Her approach to religious discourse is "my heart is there where I could help further in the faith, or where I can bring people into contact with the core, namely that they need Christ in their lives." At the pulpit of the synod of the Protestant Church she said, "This is my calling. Here I am in my place."

In the Xnoizz Flevo festival held in August 2007 for four days in the open air in Bussloo, Netherlands, which attracted more than 10,000 young people, Haasnoot was one of the speakers who talked on the subjects of "faith, God, politics and sexuality".

== Family ==
She married Rev. Jeroen Tiggelman in 1998. They have five children: Elise (born in 1998), Timo and Jesse (born in 2002) and Luke and Rebecca (born in 2011).
