= Klarenbeek =

- Village
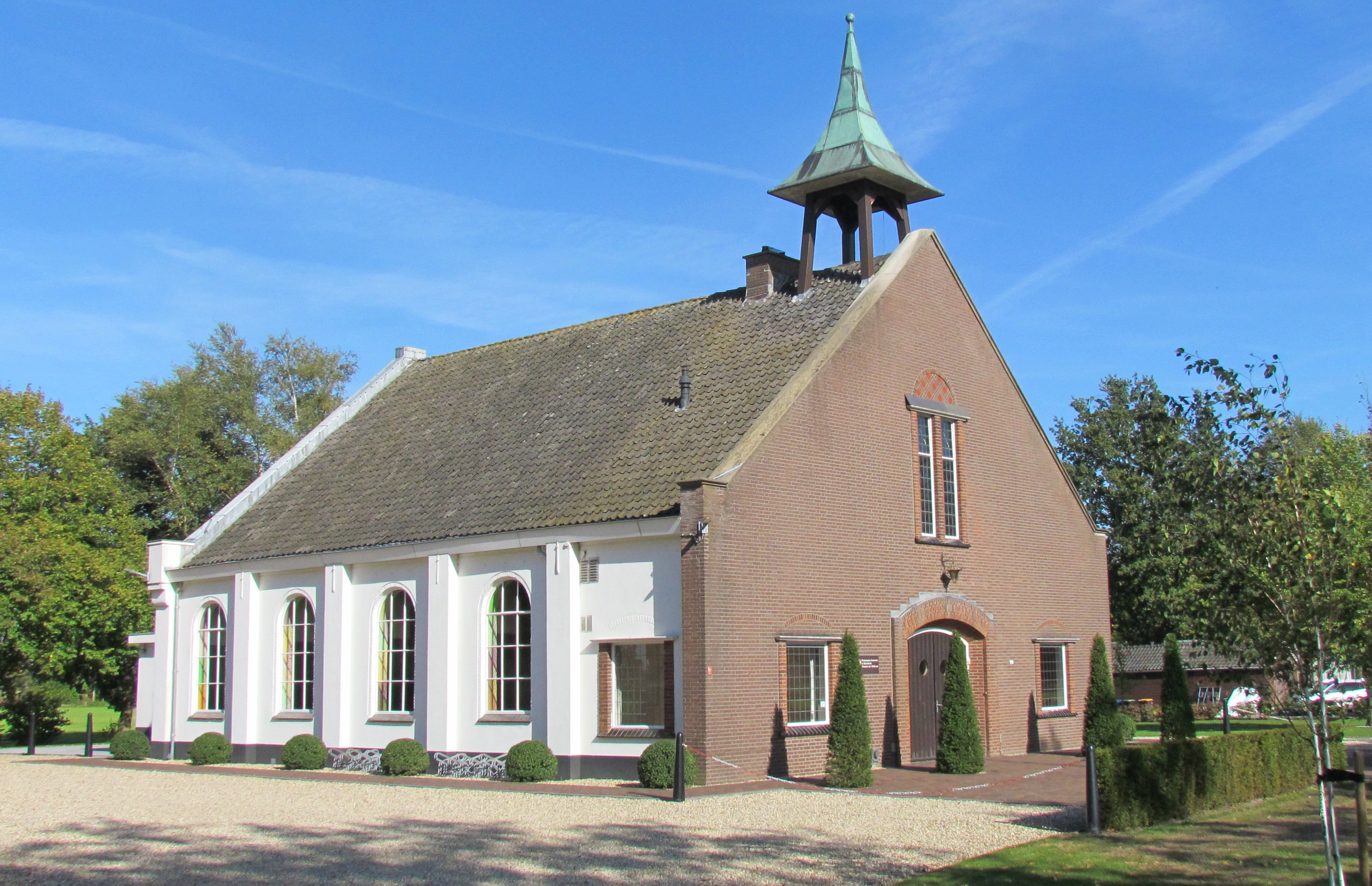
- Bethlehem Church (2022)

- Flag

- Location in the province of Gelderland Klarenbeek (Netherlands)
- Coordinates: 52°9′56″N 6°3′32″E
- Country: Netherlands
- Province: Gelderland
- Municipality: Apeldoorn; Voorst

Area
  - Total: 24.84 km^{2} (9.59 sq mi)
- Elevation: 92 m (302 ft)

Population (2021)
  - Total: 2,885
  - Density: 116.1/km^{2} (300.8/sq mi)
- Time zone: UTC+1 (CET)
  - Summer (DST): UTC+2 (CEST)
- Postal code: 7325, 7381 & 7382
- Dialing code: 055

Klarenbeek is a village in the eastern Netherlands. The village belongs to two municipalities, Apeldoorn and Voorst, with the municipality border situated in the middle of the village.

Klarenbeek is named after an estate situated next to the Klaarbeek. This estate was later also named Klarenbeek. Both Klaarbeek and Klarenbeek translate to "Clear Stream" in English.

Klarenbeek has its own railway station, Klarenbeek railway station, 2 km northeast of the village on the railway line between Apeldoorn and Zutphen. The station can be reached by Buurtbus service. This service connects with the station hourly, from 7am to 6pm. The railway station lies within the borders of the municipality of Voorst.

The village is located along the European hiking route E11, locally known as the Marskramerpad or Handelsweg.

== History ==
The village of Klarenbeek was founded in 1732 when a copper mill was established next to the Beekbergse Beek. In 1764, this copper mill was bought by the family of Krepel. To increase the capacity of the mill, the Beekbergse Beek was enlarged and heightened, causing the water to fall down faster. Later, a water reservoir called "De Wiert" was added to this. The Wiert still exists, and when the winters are cold enough, it is a common location for ice skating. The Krepel family built homes for their employees, creating the first non-farm houses in Klarenbeek.

== Gallery ==
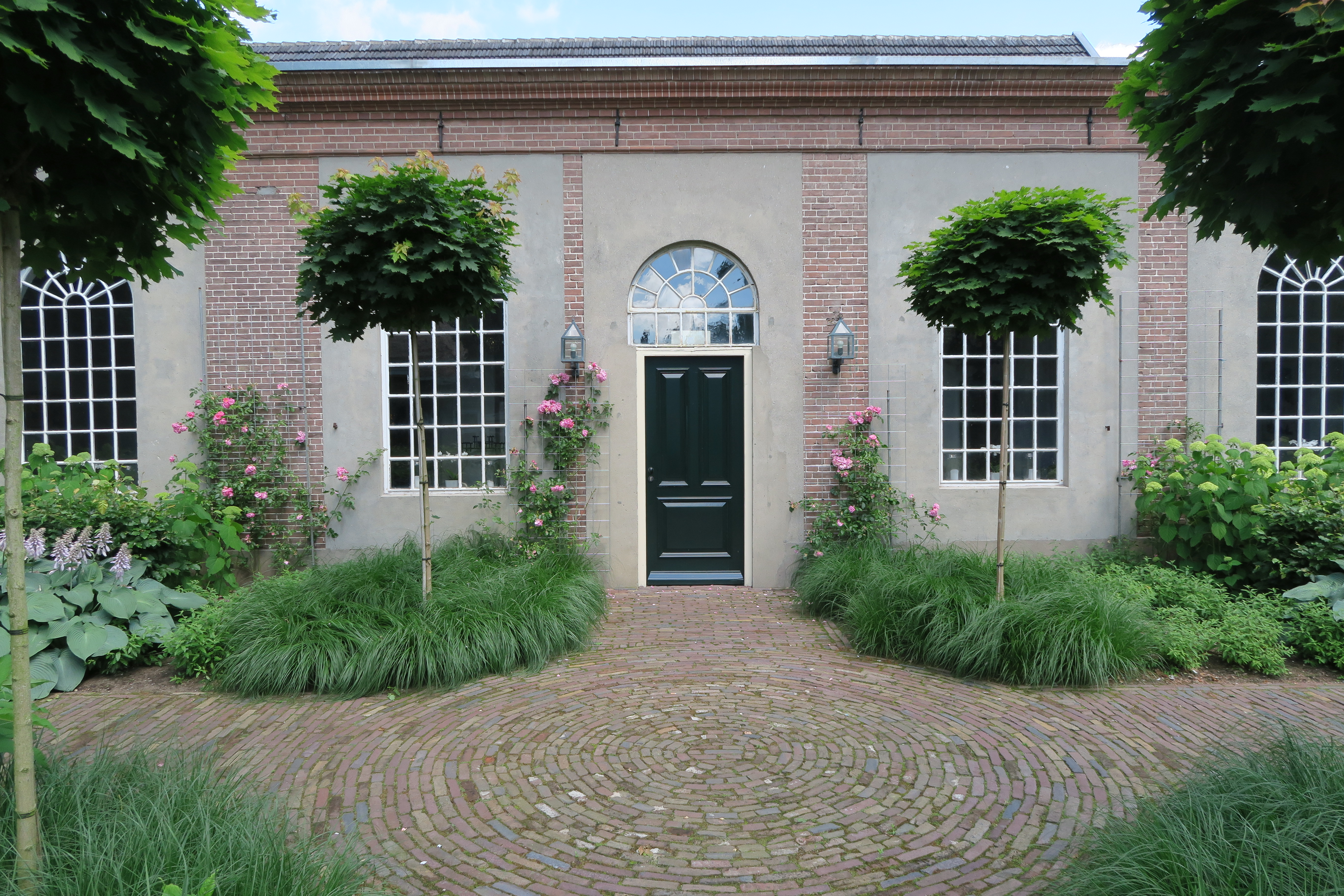
Carriage house of Huize Klarenbeek

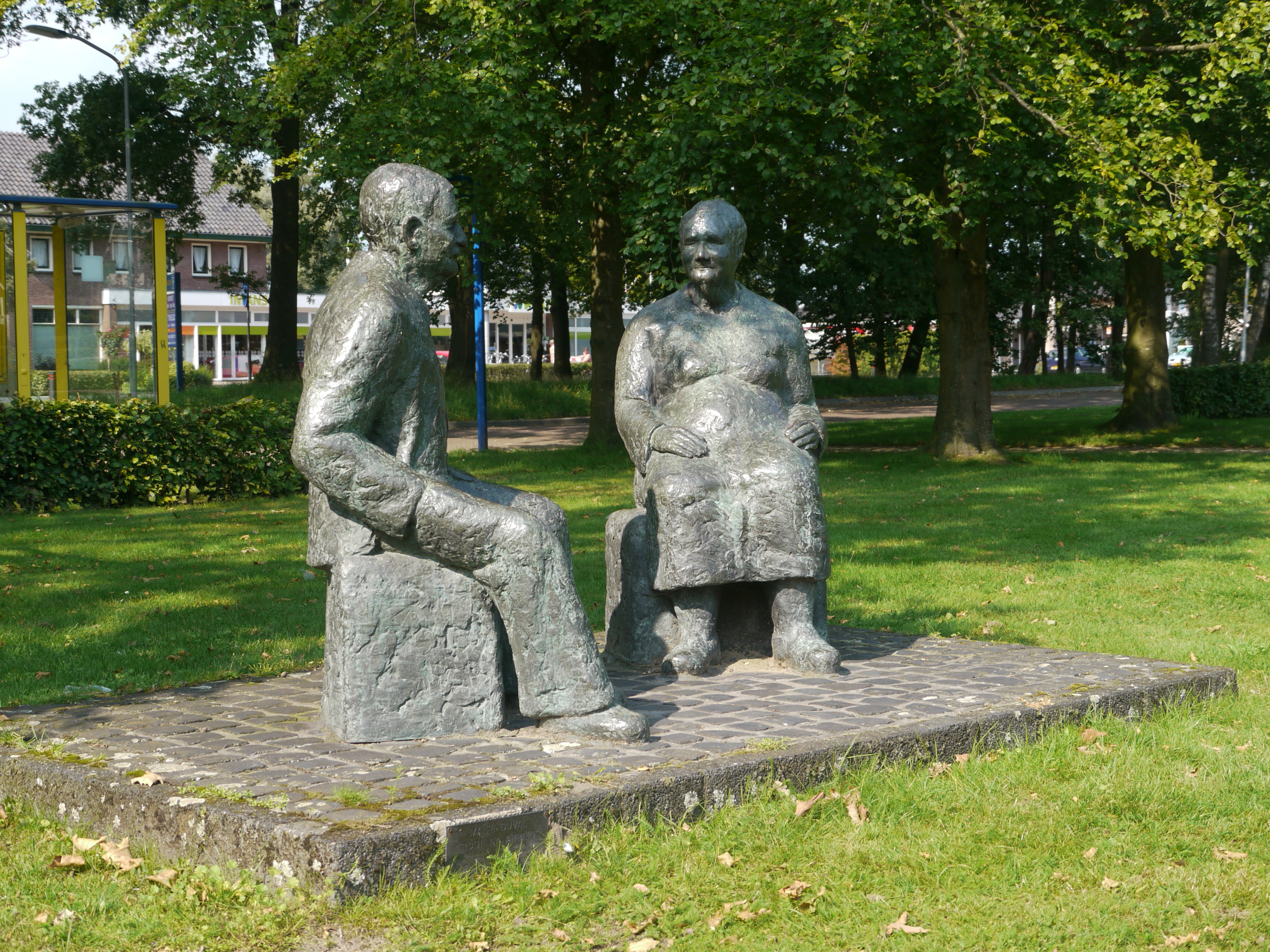
Statue of granddad and grandma by Maïté Duval

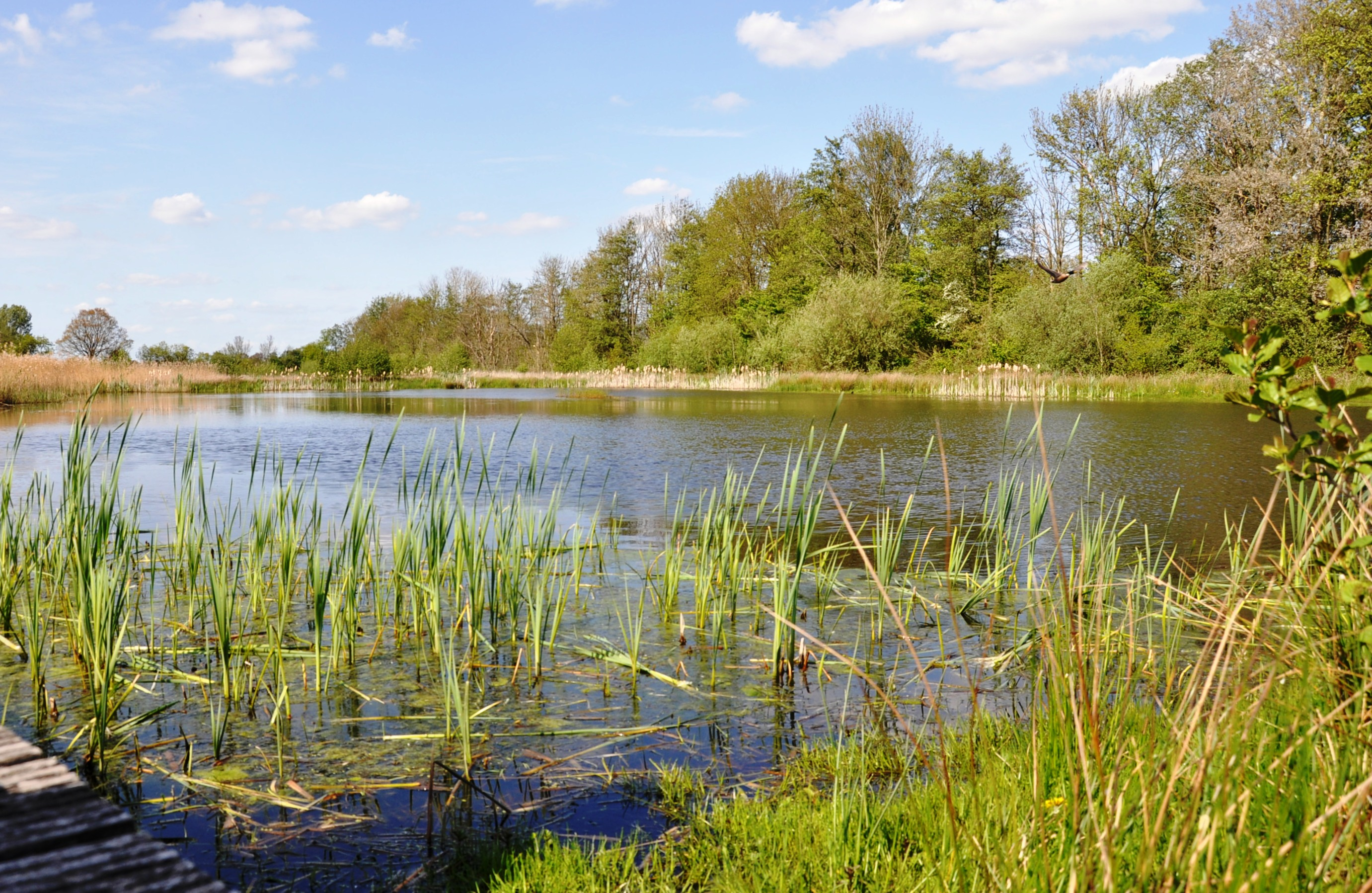
Beekbergerwoud

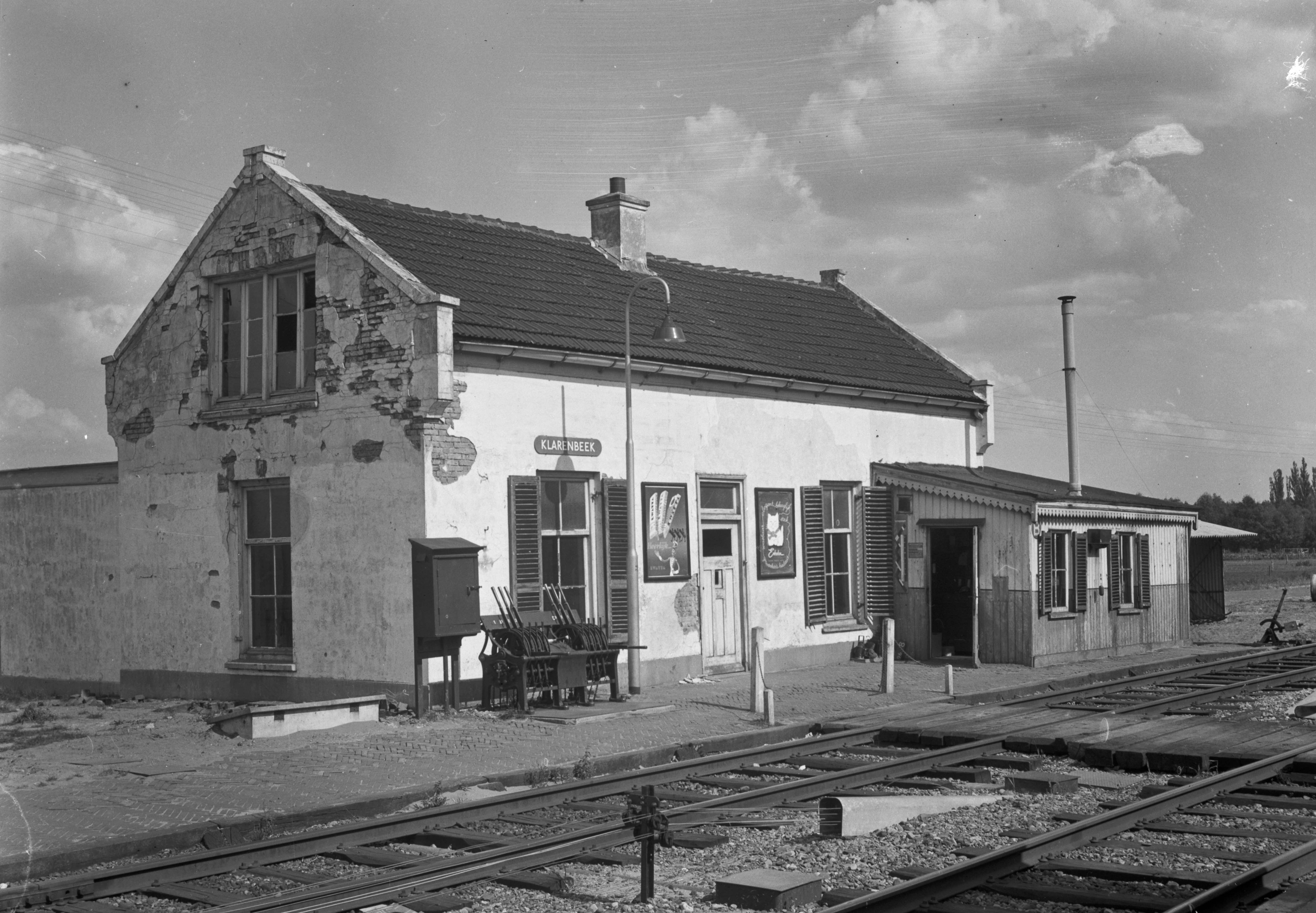
Former railway station building (demolished)
