= Wilp =

- Village
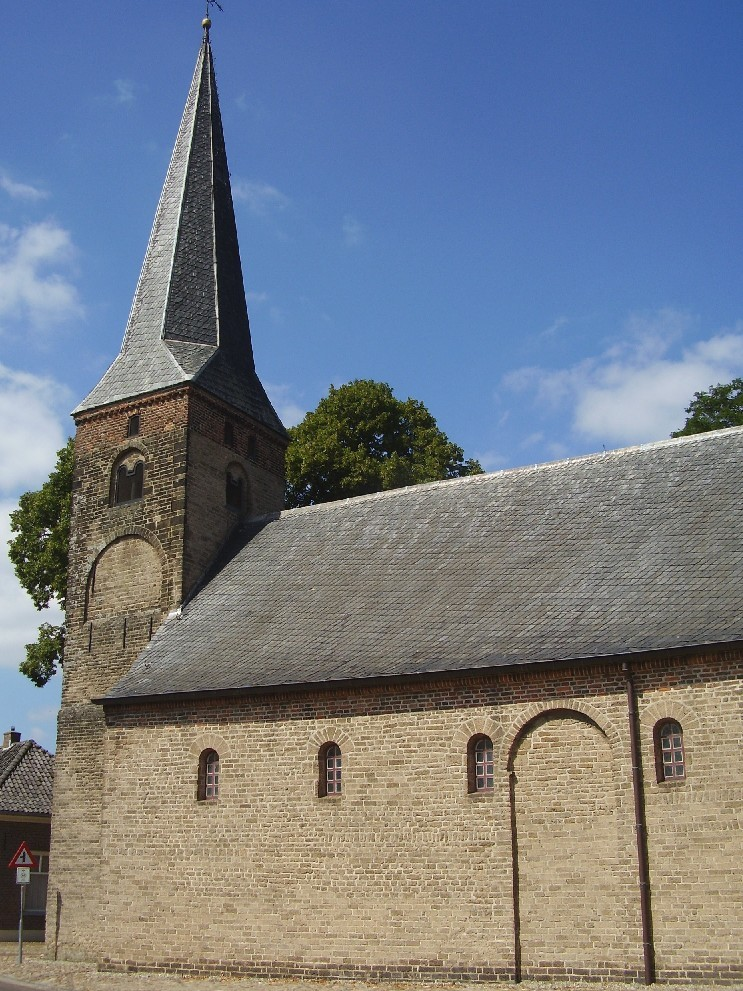
- Church in Wilp

- Location in the Netherlands Wilp (Netherlands)
- Coordinates: 52°13′7″N 6°8′59″E
- Country: Netherlands
- Province: Gelderland
- Municipality: Voorst

Area
  - Total: 13.52 km^{2} (5.22 sq mi)
- Elevation: 7 m (23 ft)

Population (2021)
  - Total: 1,940
  - Density: 143/km^{2} (372/sq mi)
- Time zone: UTC+1 (CET)
  - Summer (DST): UTC+2 (CEST)
- Postal code: 7384
- Dialing code: 0571

Wilp is a village in the Dutch province of Gelderland. It is located in the municipality of Voorst, about 4 km south of Deventer.

Wilp was a separate municipality between 1812 and 1818, when it was merged with Voorst.

== History ==
It was first mentioned between 840 and 849 as Huilpa. The etymology is unknown. The settlement started along the IJssel river. Around 765, a chapel was founded by Lebuinus. During the 19th century, a linear settlement appeared along the road from Deventer to Voorst. The church dates from the 11th century, the tower has been enlarged around 1500. In 1945, it was damaged and restored between 1949 and 1953.

The estate Lathmer was originally a havezate and probably dated from the 16th century. A new estate was built in 1866 which burned down in 1911, and was replaced by the current building which was based on drawings of the old havezate.

The Wilpermolen is a grist mill which was originally built in 1736 and rebuilt in 1766. In the early 20th century, it changed to an electromotor, but in 1941, it was put back into service. In 1991, the wind mill was restored and often used to grind fodder.

In 1840, Wilp was home to 1,103 people. Estate Lathmer is nowadays used as a school for children with general learning disabilities.

== Gallery ==
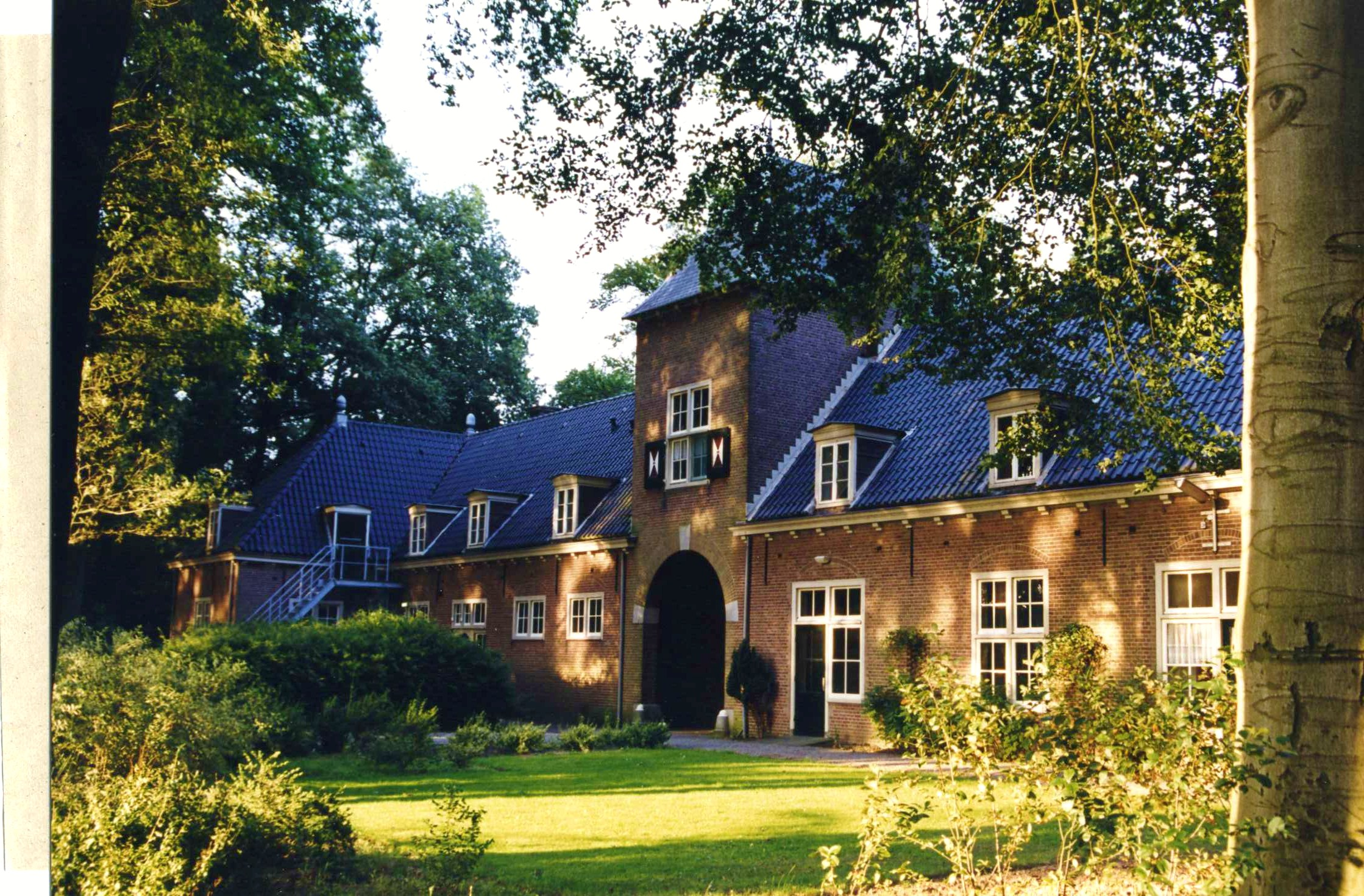
Estate Lathmer

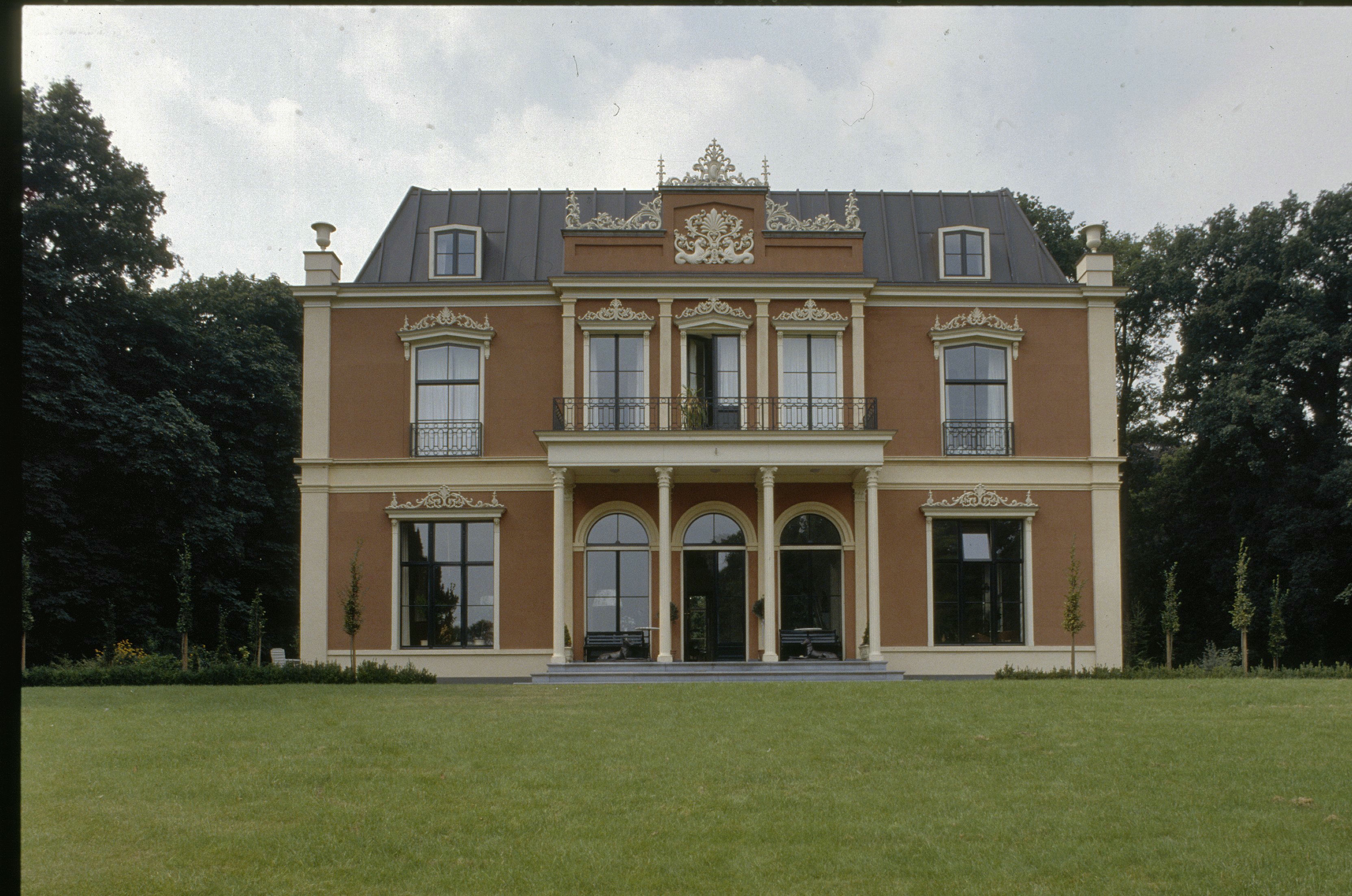
Huis 't Schol

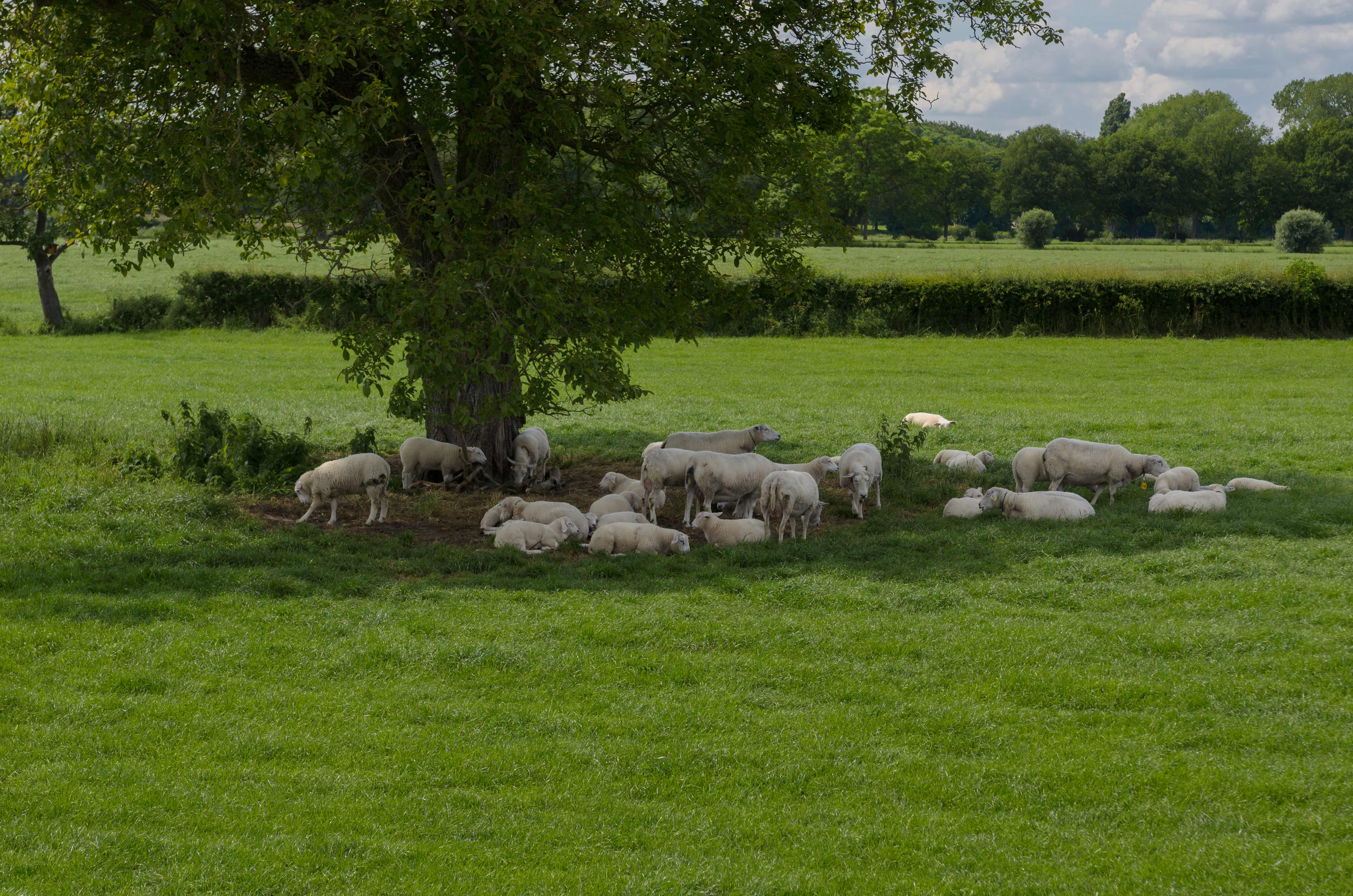
Sheep in the shade

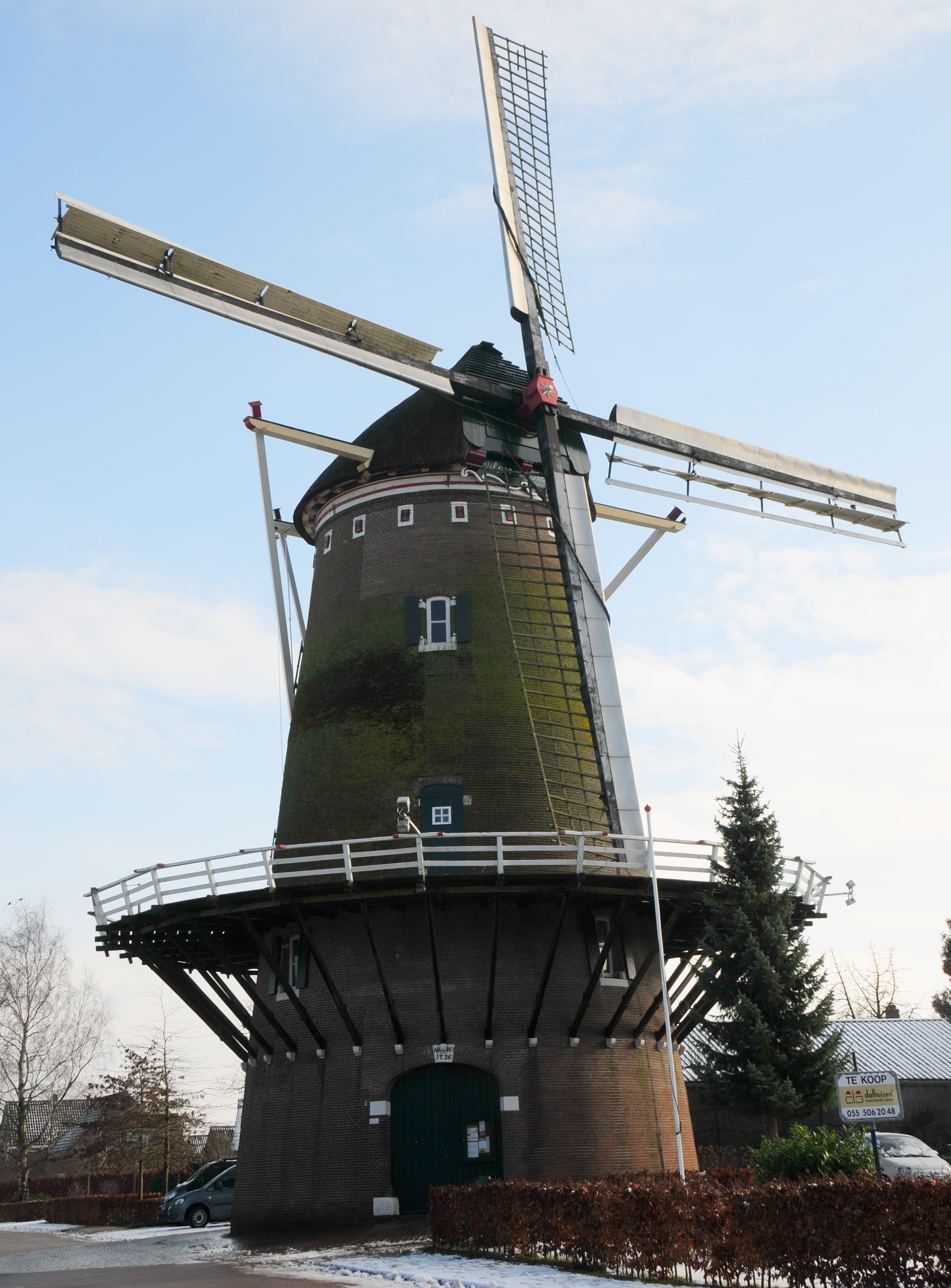
Floormill Wilp
