= Bussloo =

Village in the Netherlands

- Village
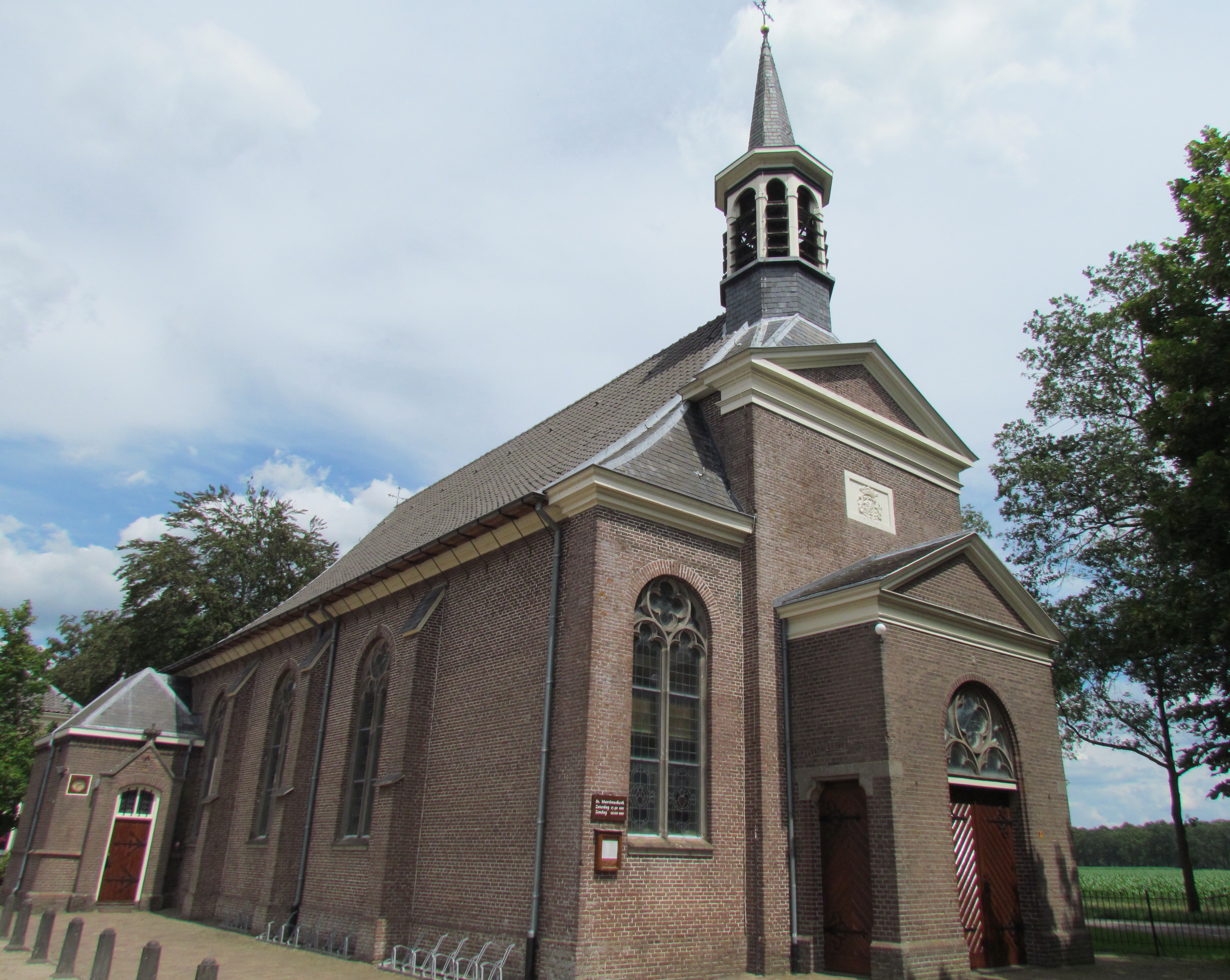
- Church of Bussloo

- Location in the Netherlands Bussloo (Netherlands)
- Coordinates: 52.1981°N 6.1314°E
- Country: Netherlands
- Province: Gelderland
- Municipality: Voorst

Area
  - Total: 4.58 km^{2} (1.77 sq mi)
- Elevation: 8 m (26 ft)

Population (2021)
  - Total: 195
  - Density: 42.6/km^{2} (110/sq mi)
- Time zone: UTC+1 (CET)
  - Summer (DST): UTC+2 (CEST)
- Postal code: 7383
- Dialing code: 0571

Bussloo is a village in the municipality of Voorst in the province of Gelderland, the Netherlands. On the beach De Kuiter, on the South Western side of the lake, nudist recreation is permitted.

It was first mentioned in 1390 as ten Loe, and means forest. In 1818, a church is built on the estate of the Baron of Wijnbergen. The ruins of Castle Bussloo are near the church. Bussloo consists of about 55 houses.

== Gallery ==
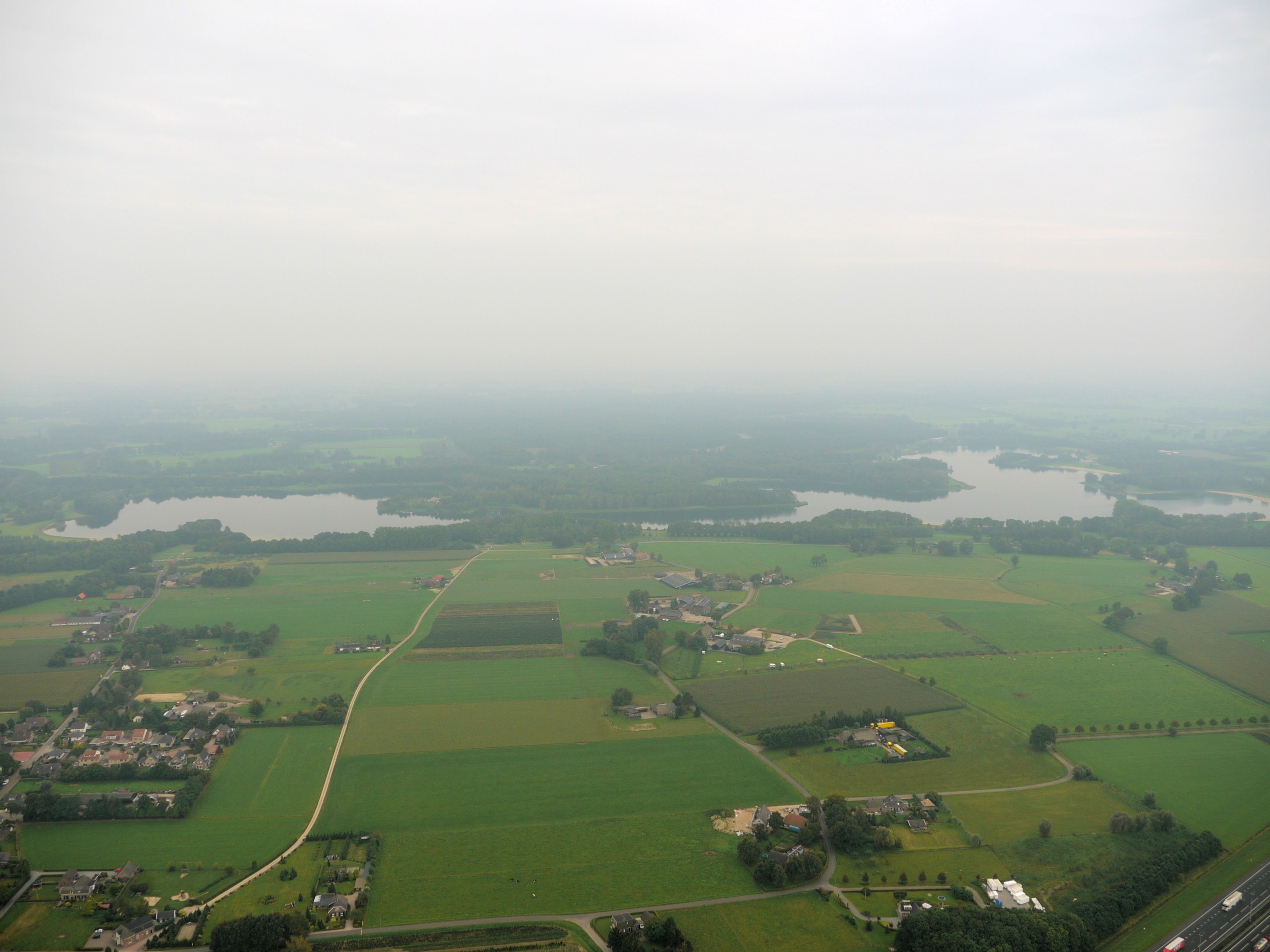
Bussloo recreation site

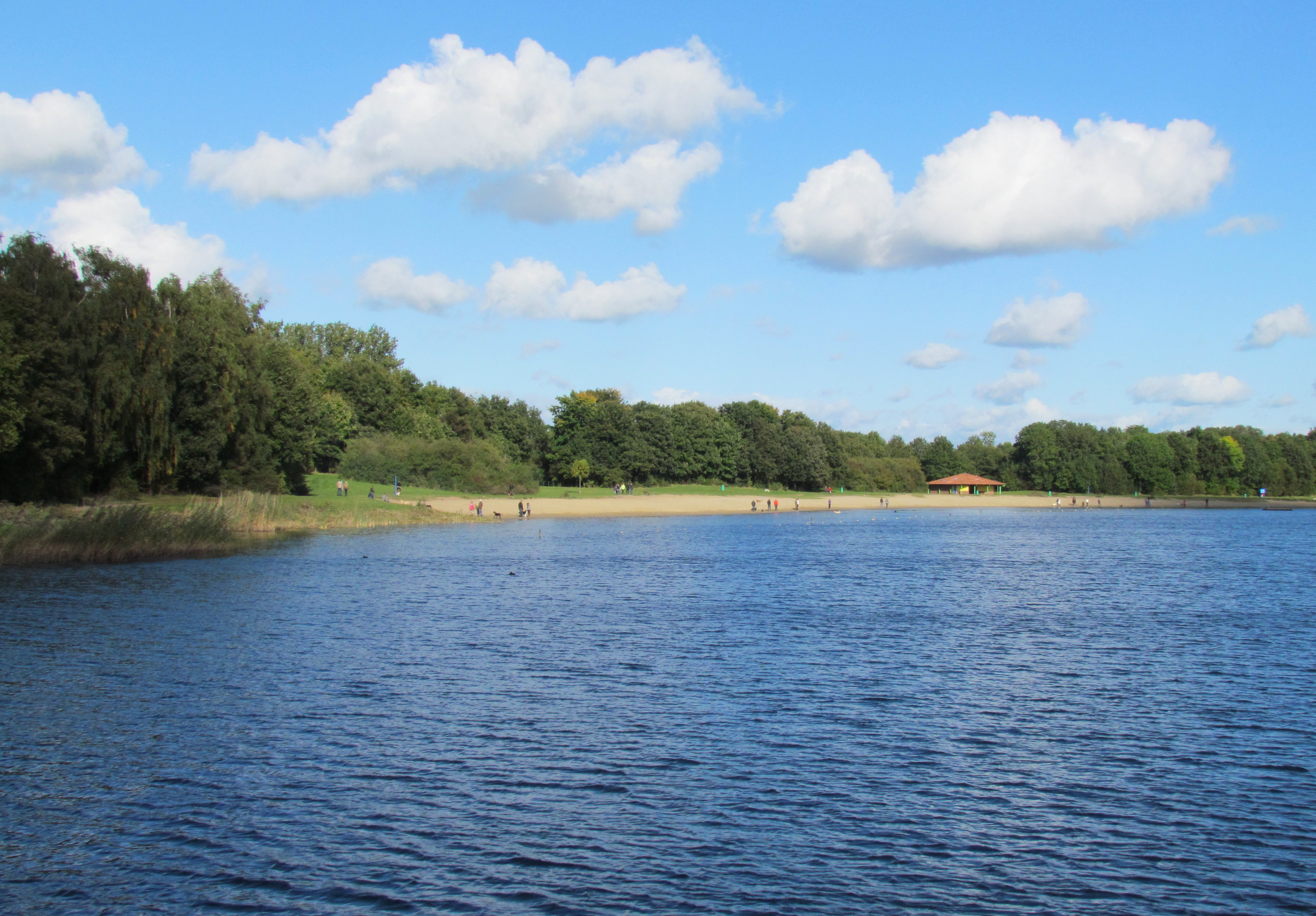

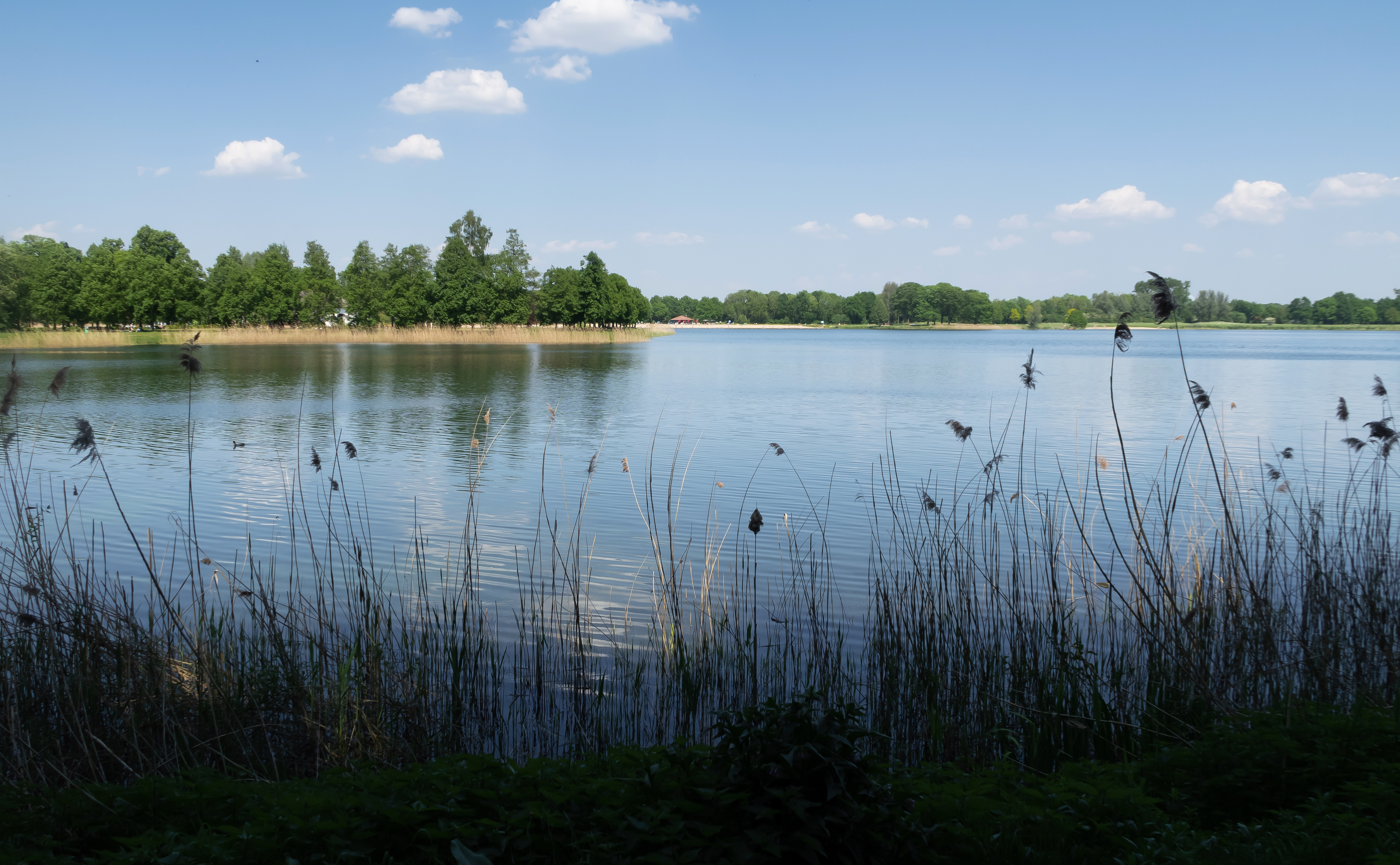
