= Voorst =

- Municipality
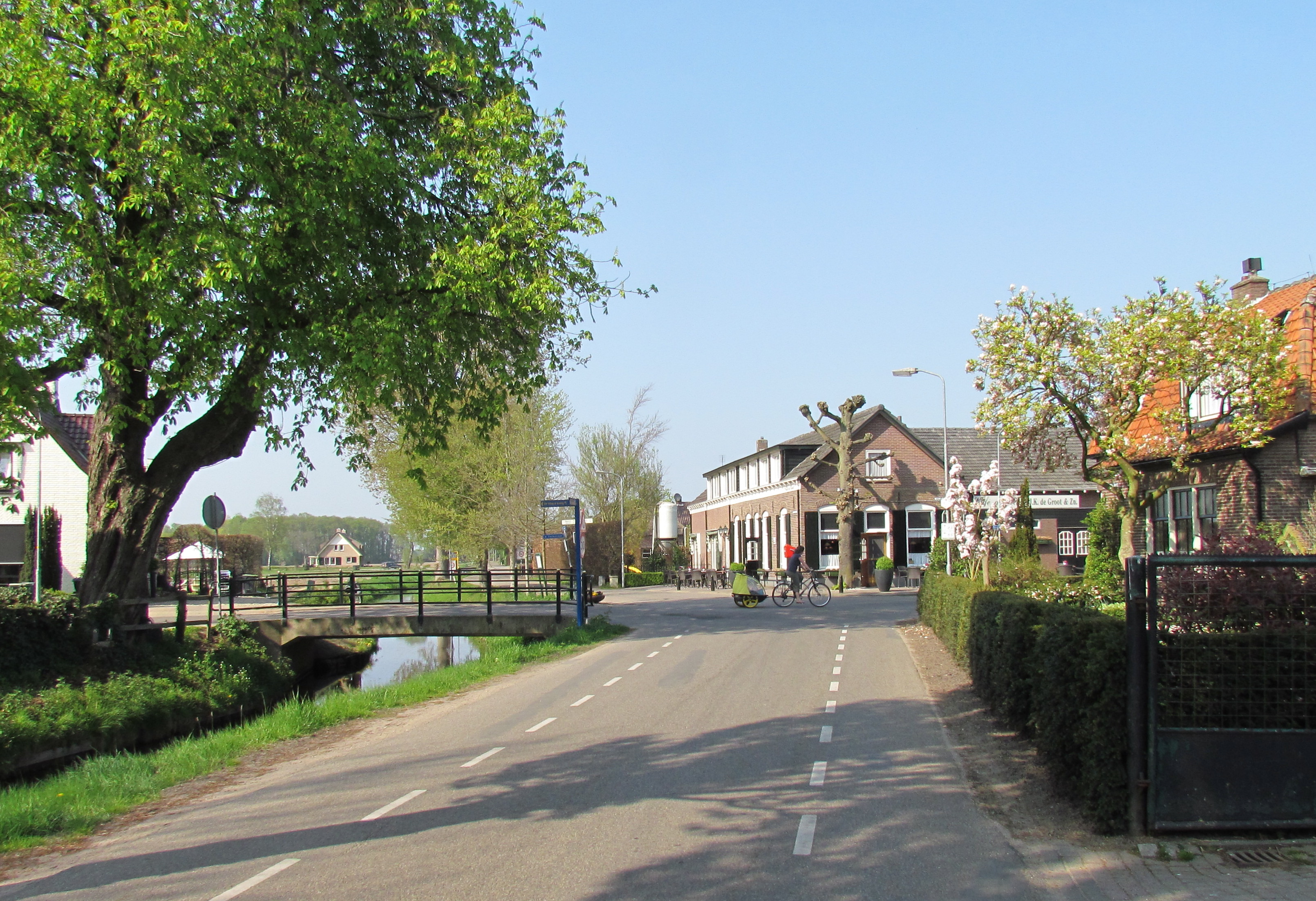
- De Vecht

- Flag Coat of arms

- Location in Gelderland
- Coordinates: 52°14′N 6°7′E
- Country: Netherlands
- Province: Gelderland

Government
  - Body: Municipal council
  - Mayor: Paula Jorritsma-Verkade (PvdA)

Area
  - Total: 126.47 km^{2} (48.83 sq mi)
  - Land: 122.97 km^{2} (47.48 sq mi)
  - Water: 3.50 km^{2} (1.35 sq mi)
- Elevation: 6 m (20 ft)

Population (January 2021)
  - Total: 24,790
  - Density: 202/km^{2} (520/sq mi)
- Demonym: Voorstenaar
- Time zone: UTC+1 (CET)
  - Summer (DST): UTC+2 (CEST)
- Postcode: 7382–7397, 7439
- Area code: 055, 0571
- Website: www.voorst.nl

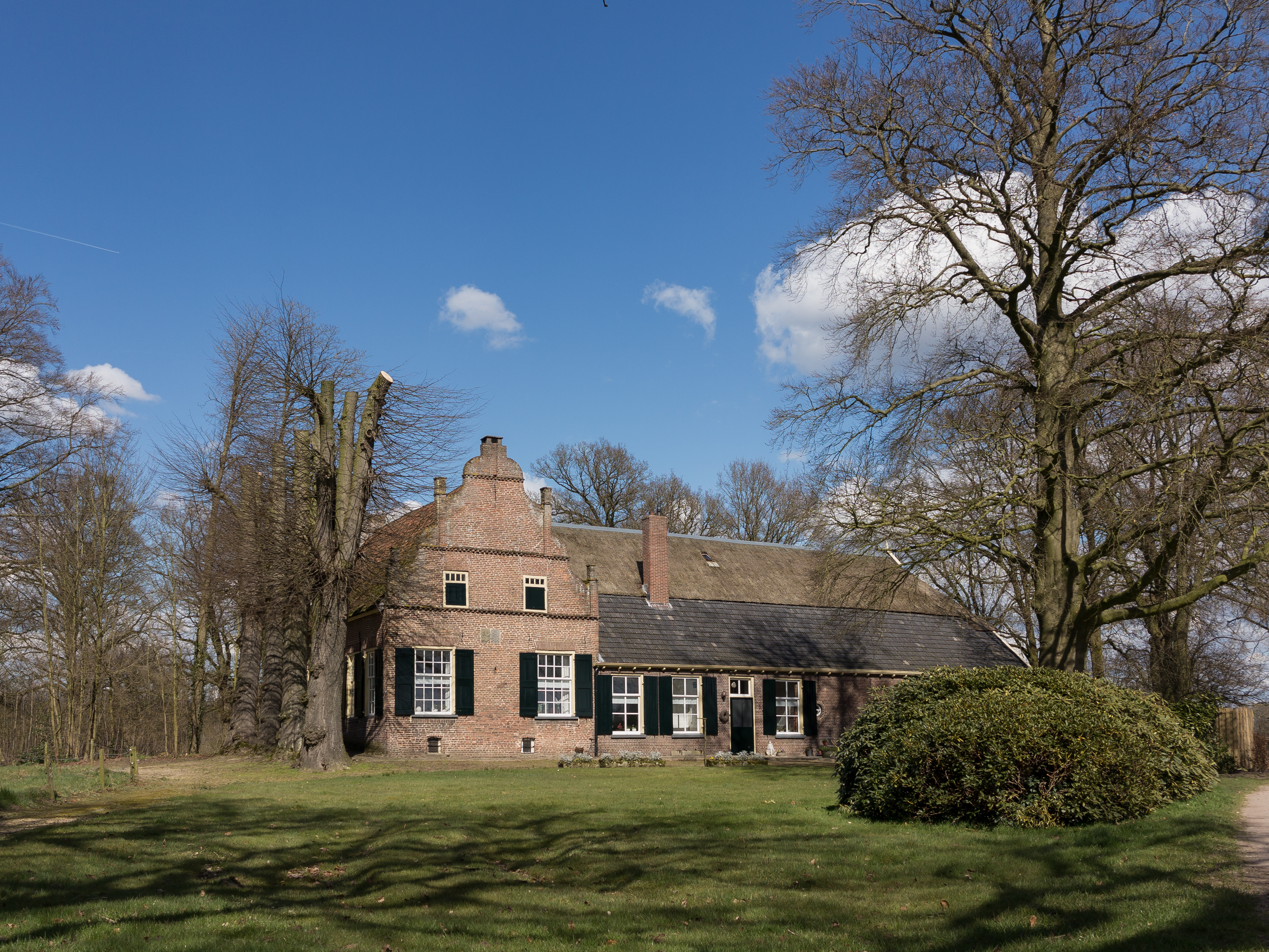
Voorst, camping-farm de Adelaar

Voorst (Dutch pronunciation: [voːrst]) is a municipality and a town in the eastern Netherlands, in the province of Gelderland.

== Population centres ==
- Appen (near a wood where nice walks can be taken)
- Bussloo (with a recreation centre with a small lake and beach)
- De Kar (near a motorway junction (A1, Amsterdam- Berlin)
- De Vecht
- De Wijk
- Gietelo (castle ruin of Nijenbeek on the IJssel dyke)
- Klarenbeek (partly in the municipality Apeldoorn; small railroad station)
- Klein-Amsterdam
- Nijbroek
- Posterenk (also near the A1, with an old Dutch wind-mill)
- Spekhoek
- Steenenkamer, actually an outskirt of Deventer
- Terwolde
- Teuge (with an airfield, where parachuting is taught)
- Twello, half-way between Apeldoorn and Deventer, which is the main village of the municipality, having over 11,000 inhabitants; the town-hall, some industry, most schools, a railway station, a shopping centre etc. can be found there
- Voorst, an old village along the road between Apeldoorn and Zutphen, with a beautiful old church; 1 mile south of Voorst, another small railroad station was opened in 2006
- Wilp, a small village on the IJssel opposite to Deventer; it has a small, old church and a hospital for the mentally disabled; the village already existed in 768; Saint Lebuinus built a chapel there; the name is allegedly derived from wel-apa that is: well-water; it is possible that prehistoric Celtic or Germanic people worshipped a holy well there.

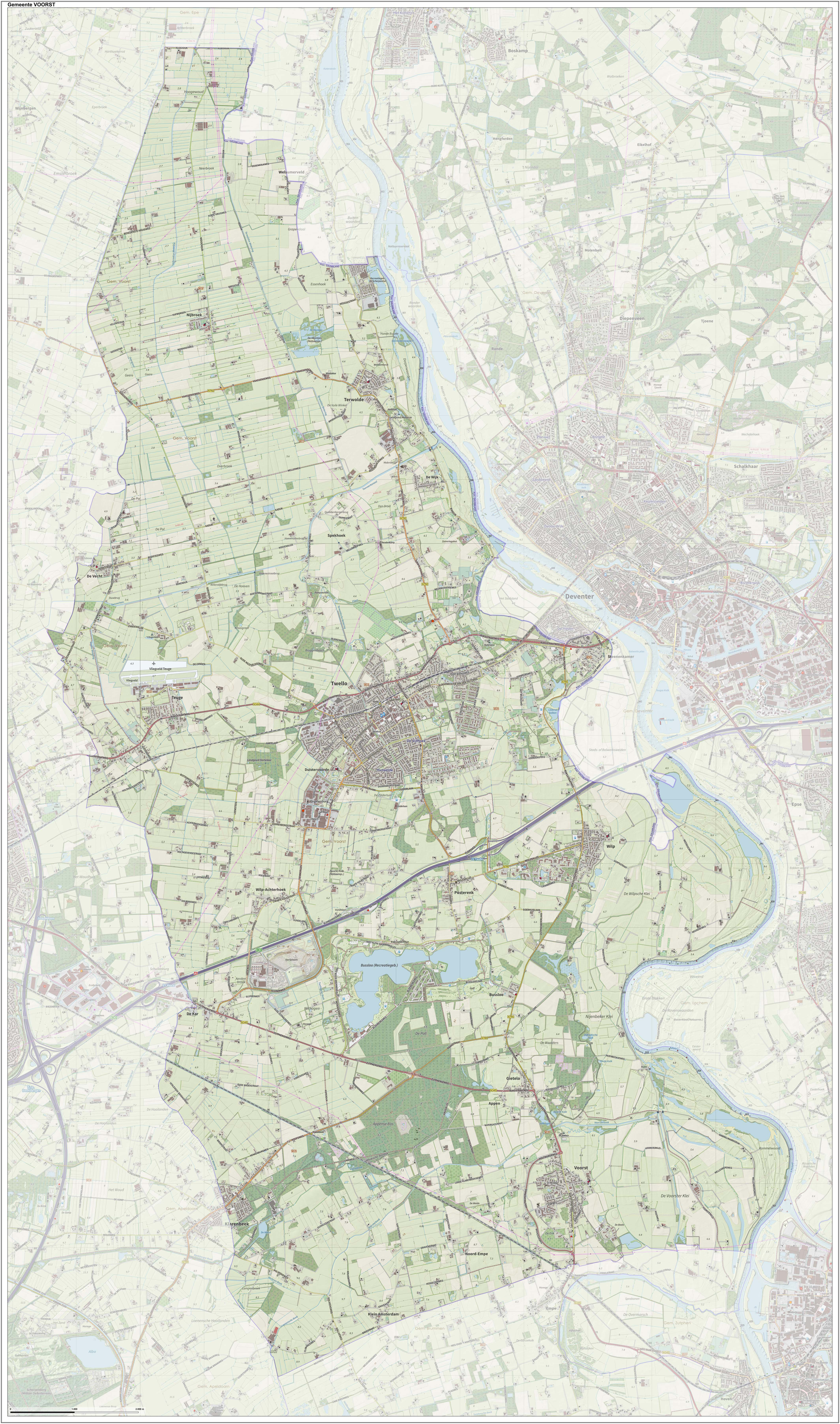

Map of the municipality of Voorst, June 2015

== Notable people ==
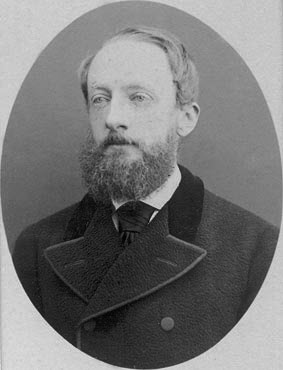
W.A.A.J. Schimmelpenninck van der Oye

- Ludolph Anne Jan Wilt Sloet van de Beele (1806 in Voorst – 1890) the Governor-General of the Dutch East Indies 1861/1866
- Johannes Gijsbertus Bastiaans (1812 in Wilp - 1875) an organist, composer and music theorist
- Anthony Winkler Prins (1817 in Voorst – 1908) a writer of the Winkler Prins encyclopedia
- Willem Anne Assueer Jacob Schimmelpenninck van der Oye (1834 in Voorst – 1889) a baron and politician
- Jan Terlouw (born 1931 in Kamperveen – 2025) a politician, physicist and author
- Evert Jan Baerends (born 1945 in Voorst) a theoretical chemist and academic

=== Sport ===
- Jan-Dirk Nijkamp (born 1964 in Voorst) a Dutch sprint canoer who competed in the 1992 Summer Olympics
- Jurgen Streppel (born 1969 in Voorst) a retired football player with 373 club caps
- Robert Horstink (born 1981 in Twello) a volleyball player, competed in the 2004 Summer Olympics

== Gallery ==
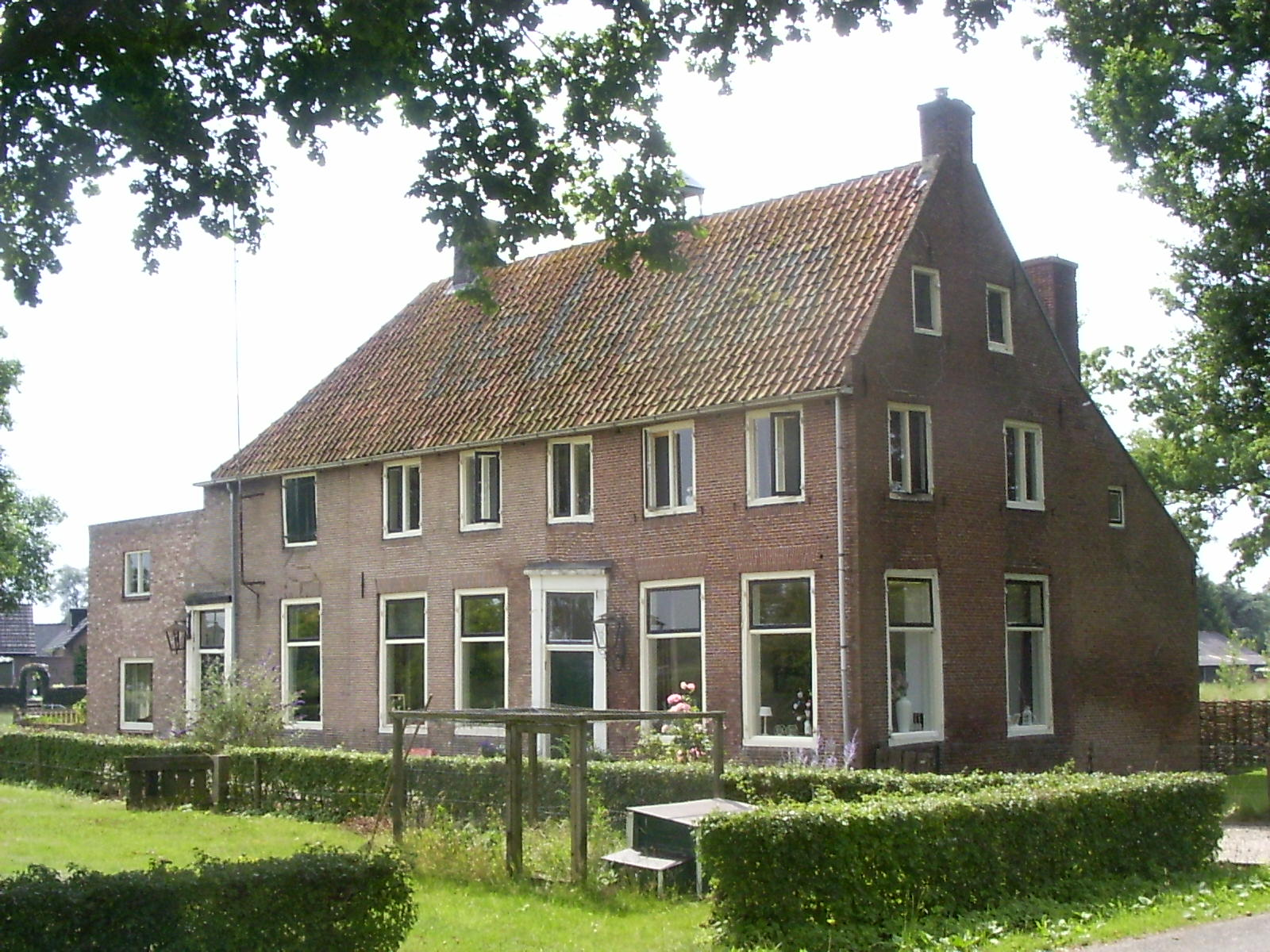
Terwolde, Lochemsestraat

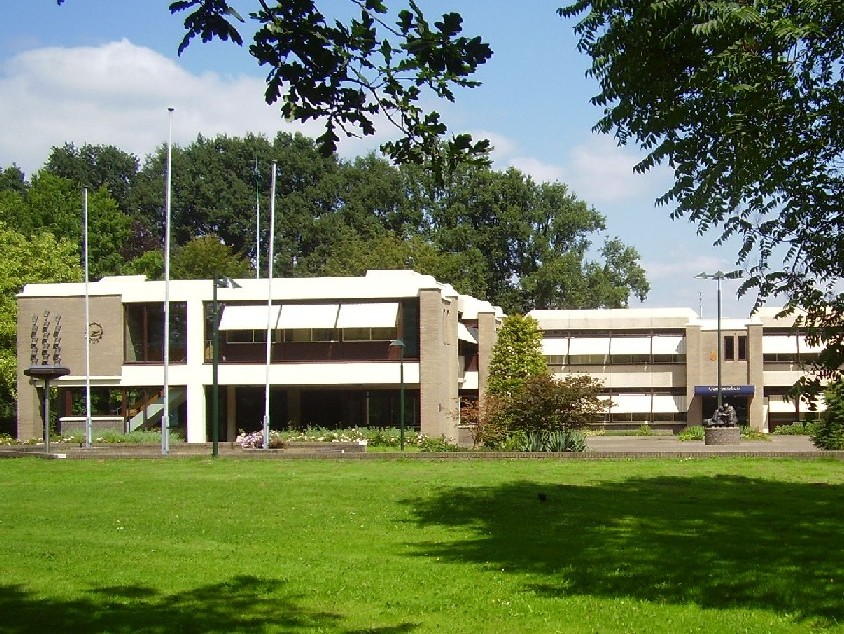
Voorst gemeentehuis

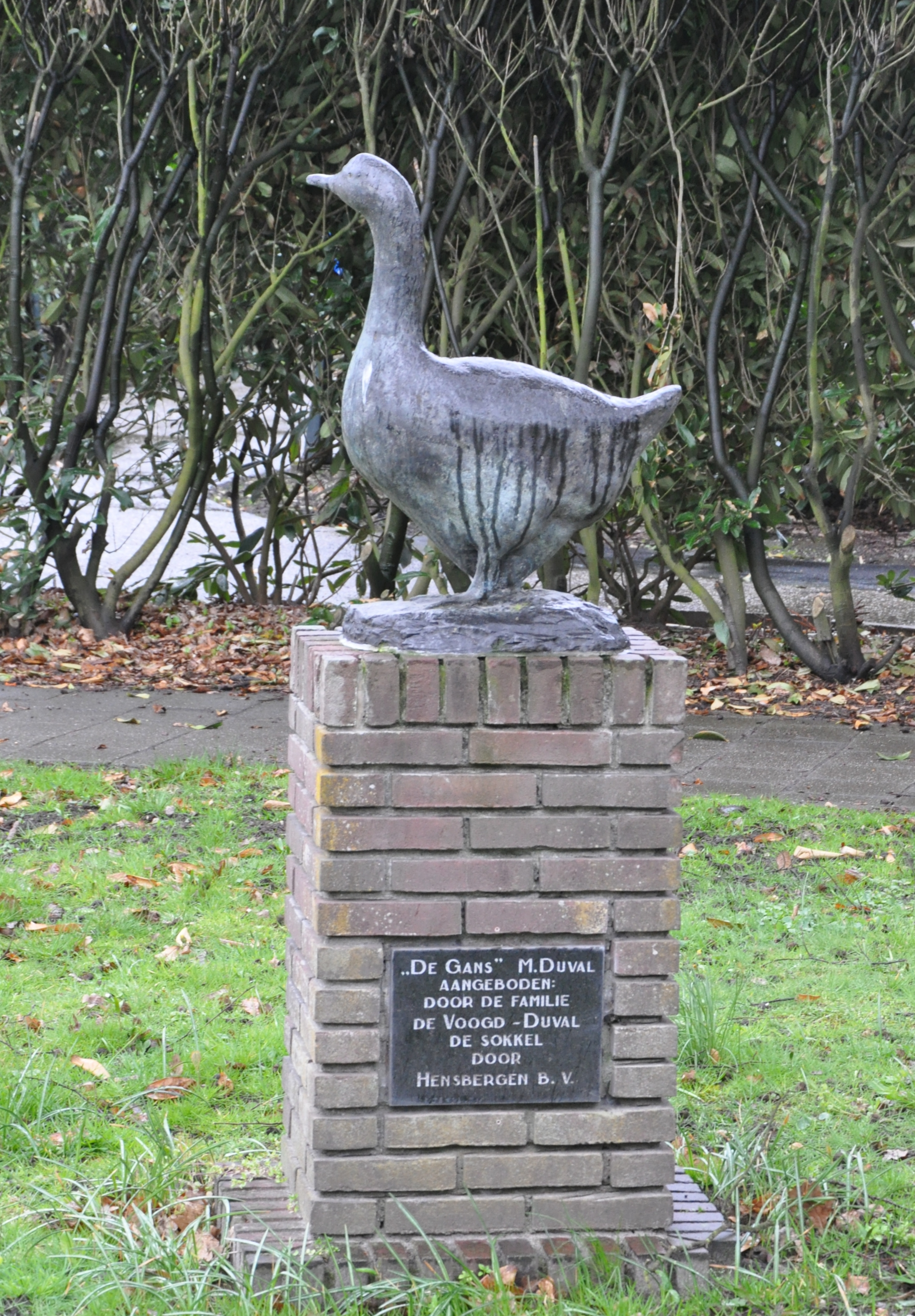
De gans, Voorst

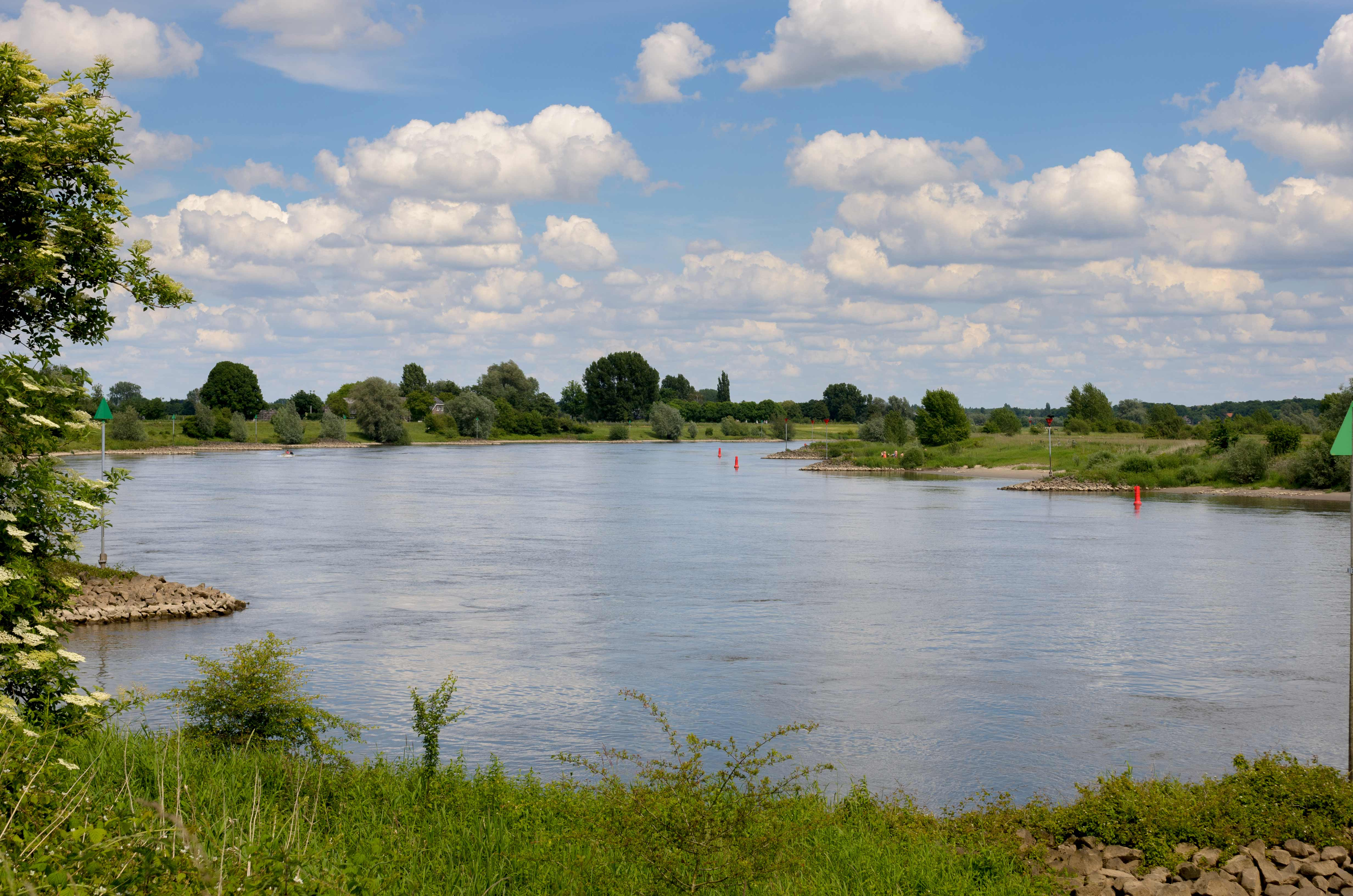
The IJssel near Bussloo
