= Transport in Apeldoorn =

This article discusses transport in Apeldoorn, the Netherlands. Apeldoorn is a city located 60 miles southeast of Amsterdam. The municipality has a population of about 156,000, with 138,000 living in the town itself.

== Urban transport ==
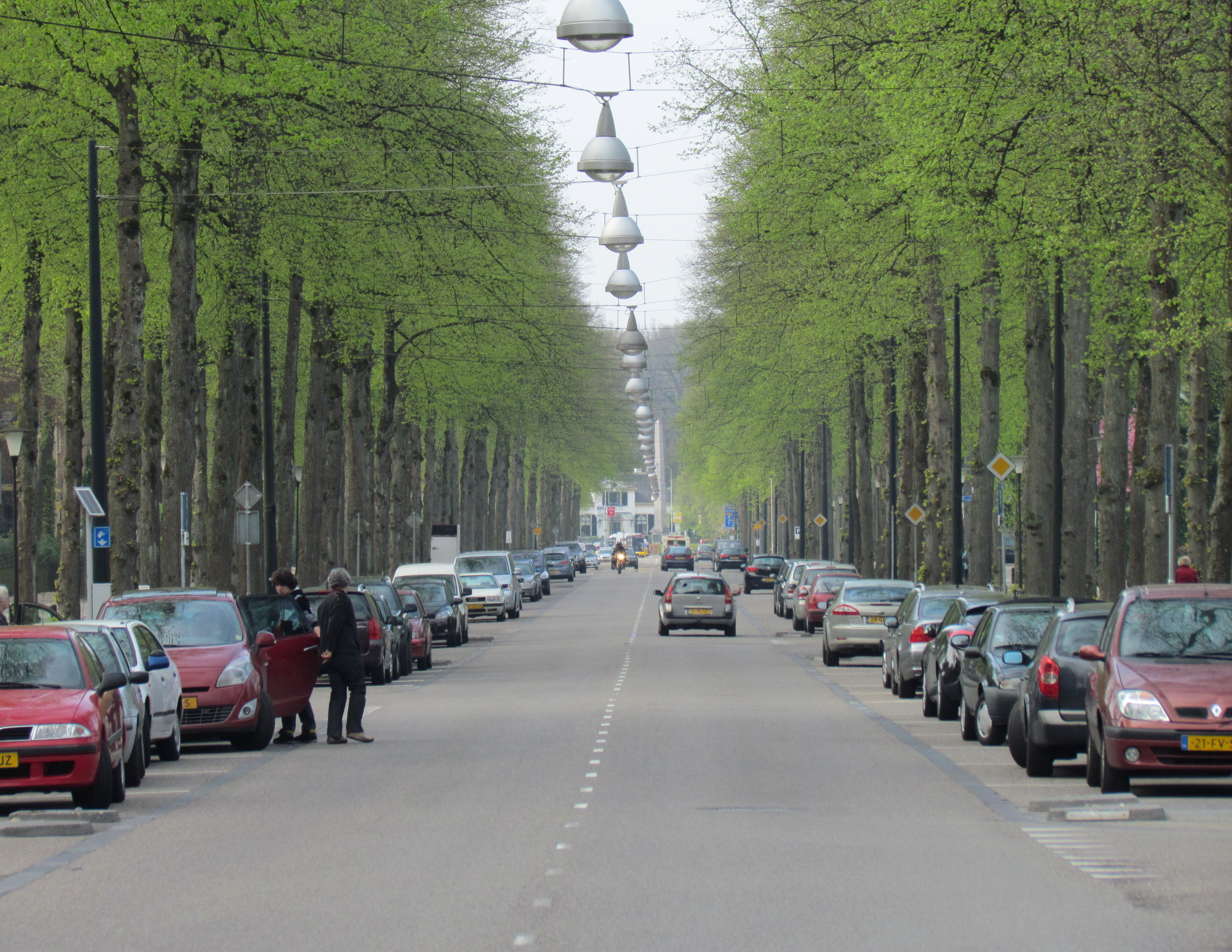
Loolaan, one of the main roads into Apeldoorn from the north west

=== Bus ===
Bus services in and around Apeldoorn are provided by Keolis Nederland, with a few services operated by Breng. All buses depart from the bus station, which is at the railway station. Many services also serve stops closer to the shopping areas of Apeldoorn.

There is an expansive network of services within the town, with 17 services serving all parts of the town. Regional bus services operate to Arnhem, Beekbergen, Dieren, Ede, Epe, Harderwijk, Hoenderloo, Hoge Veluwe National Park, Vaassen and Zwolle.

Town services operate every 30 minutes, regional services operate every two hours or more often.

=== Cycle ===
Like most of the Netherlands, it is easy to cycle to get around Apeldoorn with many cycle paths or on the roads, A cycle tunnel under the central station to allow easier travel between the town centre and the south of the town.

EuroVelo cycle route 2 passes through Apeldoorn.

== Longer distance transport ==
=== Car ===
Apeldoorn is directly connected to the Dutch motorway network. It is situated on the A1 Motorway and A50 Motorway.

=== Rail ===
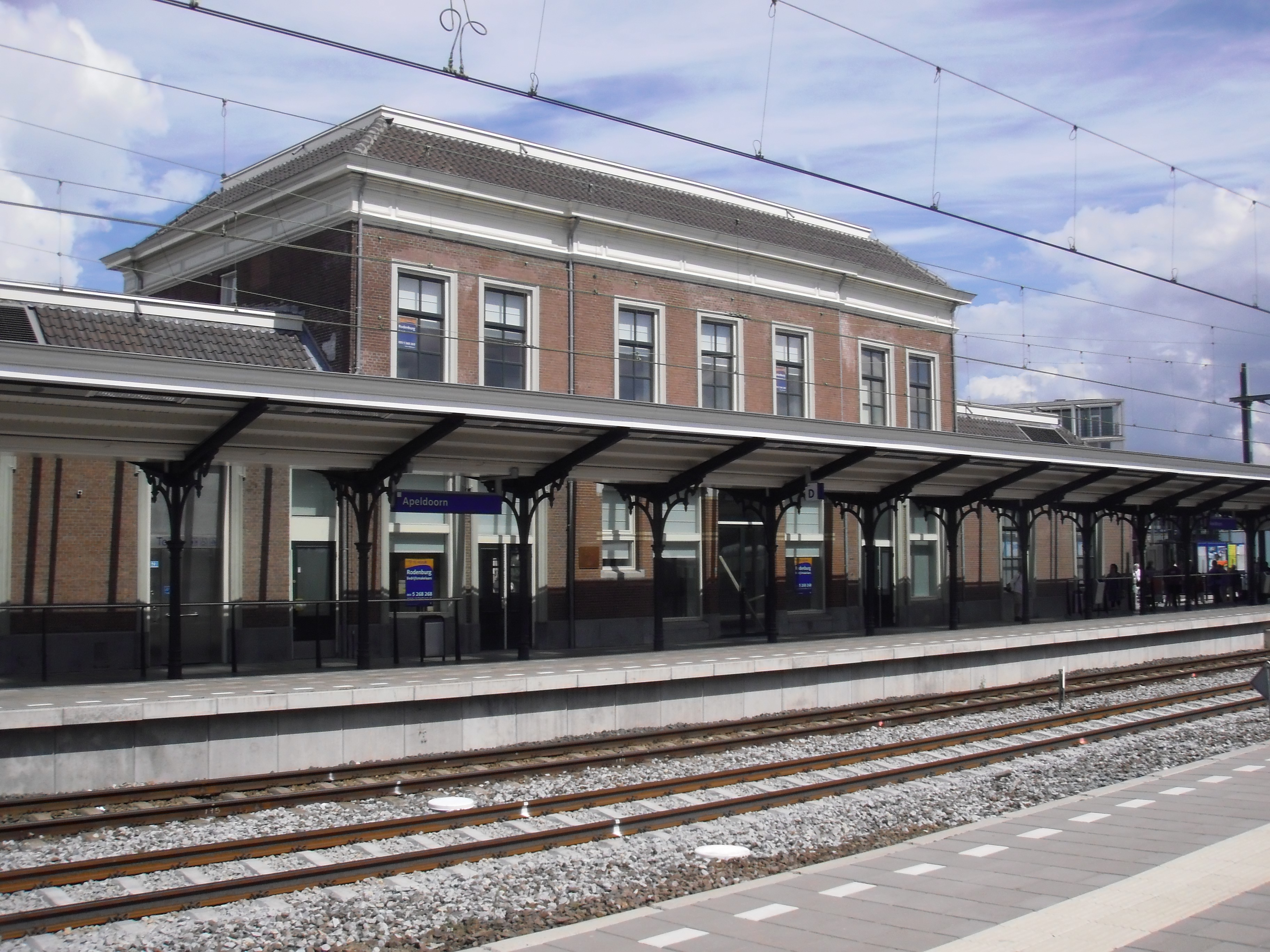
Apeldoorn station

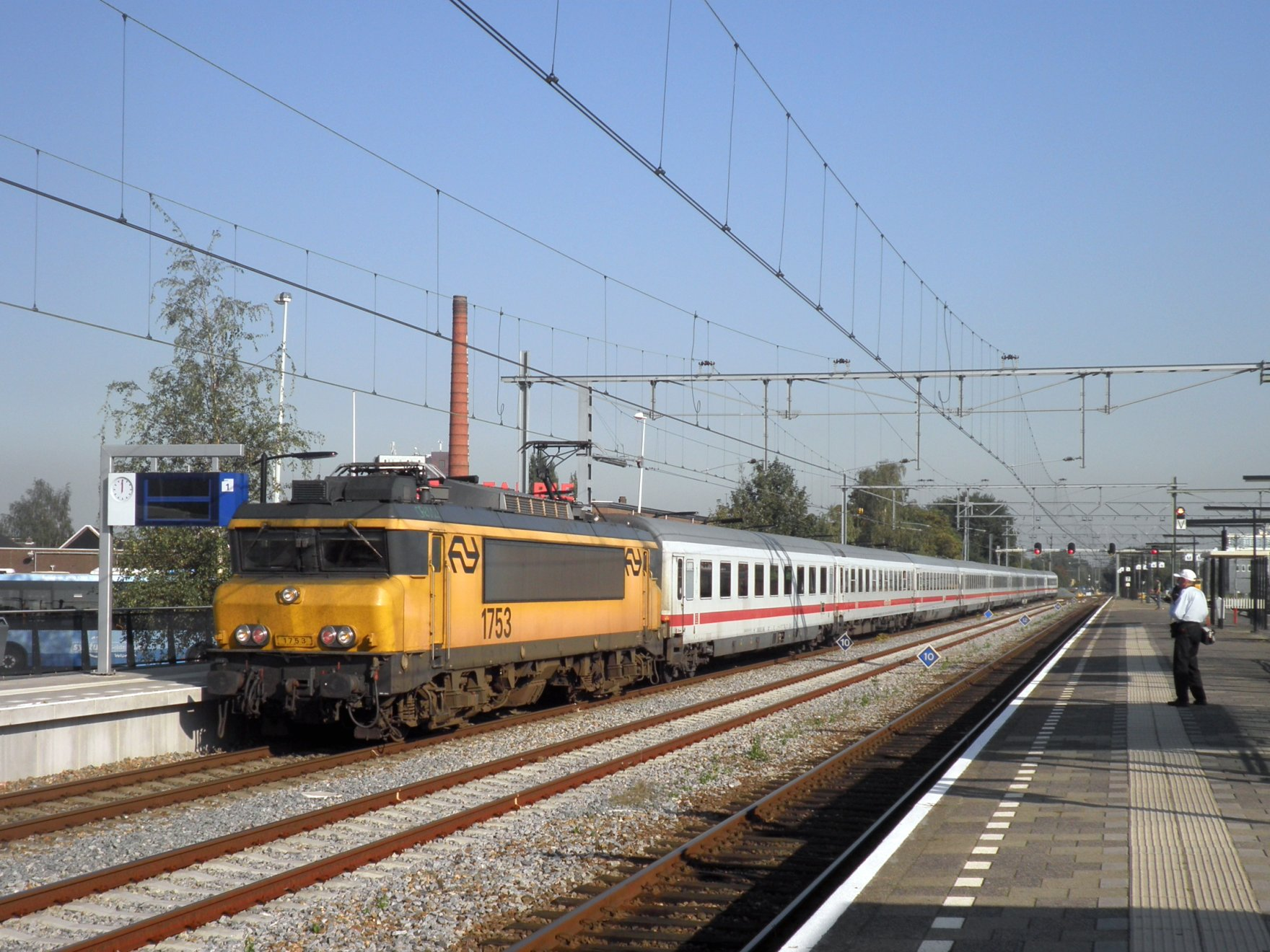
Intercity from Berlin arriving at Apeldoorn station

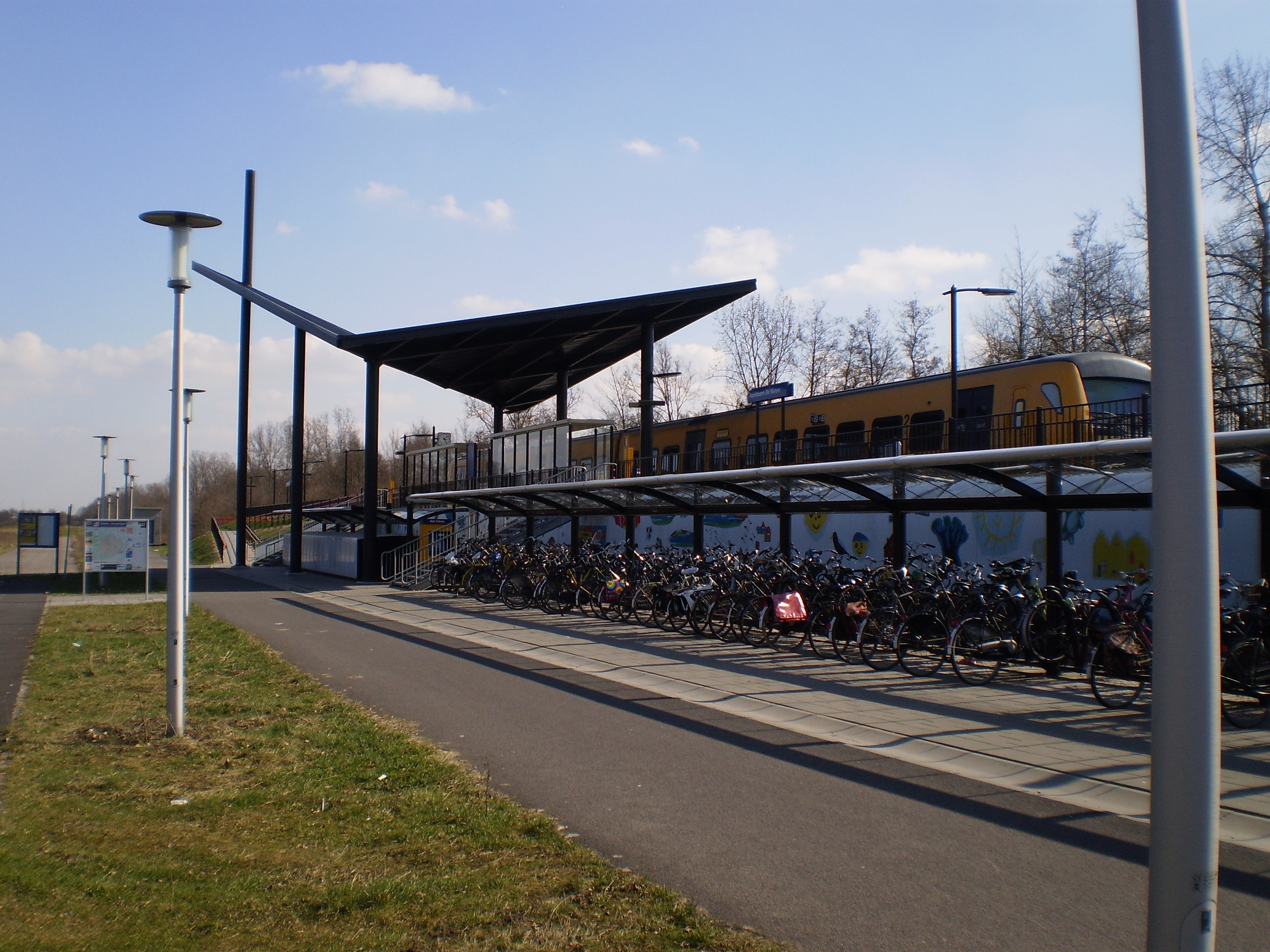
Apeldoorn De Maten station

Apeldoorn railway station, close to the town centre, serves trains to Amersfoort, Amsterdam, Amsterdam Airport Schiphol, Utrecht, Rotterdam, The Hague, Enschede, Osnabrück, Hannover and Berlin. Smaller towns and villages are also served by local trains, such as Zutphen.

Apeldoorn also has two stations served by local trains, both in the east of the town; Apeldoorn de Maten on the line to Zutphen and Apeldoorn Osseveld on the line to Deventer.

Train services are operated by Nederlandse Spoorwegen and Arriva.

=== Coach ===
Flixbus operates coach services which call at Apeldoorn since 3 December 2015. These depart from the railway station. Currently the town is served by the service from Groningen to Apeldoorn and Eindhoven.

=== Air ===
There is a small airport in the village of Teuge 6 kilometres (3.7 mi) east of Apeldoorn, although there are no passenger flights from this airport.

The nearest international flights are from Amsterdam Airport Schiphol approximately 80 kilometres (50 mi) away.

== See also ==
- Transport in the Netherlands
