= Apeldoorn railway station =

Railway station in the Netherlands

Apeldoorn
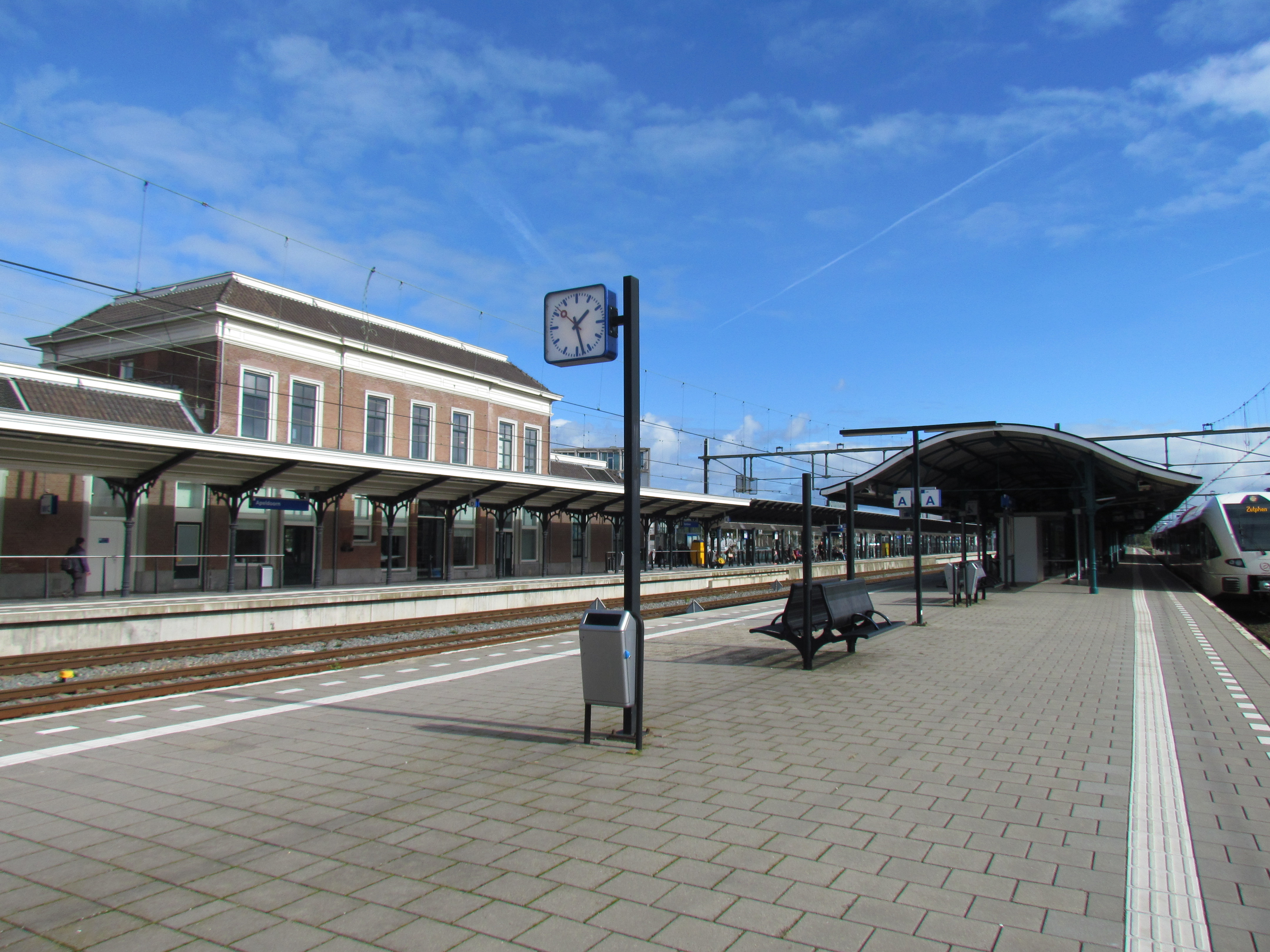
- Apeldoorn railway station in October 2017

General information
- Location: Stationsplein 8 Apeldoorn, Netherlands
- Coordinates: 52°12′33″N 5°58′10″E
- Operator: NS Stations
- Lines: Amsterdam–Zutphen railway; Apeldoorn–Deventer railway; Apeldoorn–Dieren railway
- Platforms: 4
- Tracks: 8
- Train operators: Arriva; NS; NS International
- Bus operators: EBS; Hermes

Construction
- Parking: P+R on the south side.
- Cycle facilities: Unguarded parking facilities on both sides. Guarded underground parking facility with a repair shop and OV-fiets rental on the north side.
- Accessible: Elevators and stair-free entrances are available.

Other information
- Station code: Apd
- Website: ns.nl/stationsinformatie/apd/apeldoorn

History
- Opened: 15 May 1876
- Rebuilt: 1911, 2004-2008.
- Electrified: 1951

Passengers
- 12.590 in 2024.
Services
Preceding station	NS International	Following station
Amersfoort Centraal towards Amsterdam Centraal	Intercity (DB) 140	Deventer towards Berlin Ostbahnhof
Preceding station	Nederlandse Spoorwegen	Following station
Amersfoort Centraal towards Amsterdam Centraal	NS Intercity 1500	Deventer Terminus
Amersfoort Centraal towards Den Haag Centraal	NS Intercity 1700	Deventer towards Enschede
Amersfoort Centraal towards Rotterdam Centraal	NS Intercity 1700 After 20:00.	Deventer towards Enschede
Terminus	NS Sprinter 7000 Ends at Almelo in off-peak hours.	Apeldoorn Osseveld towards Enschede
Preceding station	Arriva Netherlands	Following station
Terminus	Stoptrein 17800	Apeldoorn De Maten towards Zutphen
Terminus	Stoptrein 30800 Only runs after 20:00 and on the weekend.	Zutphen towards Winterswijk
Location
- Location within Netherlands

Apeldoorn railway station (Dutch pronunciation: [ˈaːpəldoːr(ə)n]; abbreviation: Apd) is a railway station in Apeldoorn, Netherlands. The station was opened on 15 May 1876, on the Amsterdam–Zutphen railway. It was opened when the Amersfoort to Zutphen section was completed.

== Location ==
The railway station is located at the Stationsplein (English: Station Square) in the town center of Apeldoorn in the province of Gelderland in the middle of the Netherlands. It is situated on the Amsterdam–Zutphen railway between the railway stations of Hoevelaken in the west and Apeldoorn De Maten in the east. It is also the western terminus of the Apeldoorn–Deventer railway before Apeldoorn Osseveld in the east and the northern terminus of the Apeldoorn–Dieren railway before Beekbergen in the south.

== History ==
The railway station was opened on 15 May 1876.

In 1887 there were local lines from Apeldoorn in three directions:

- Apeldoorn–Zwolle railway (dismantled)
- Apeldoorn–Dieren railway (now property of the VSM Steam Railway)
- Apeldoorn–Deventer railway in use since 1887.

The renovation in 1911 added an vestibule on the platforms in the middle of the station.

The station became electrified along with the Apeldoorn–Deventer railway line in 1951.

The station building was saved in connection with a massive refurbishment of the station from 2004 to 2008.

== Station building and layout ==
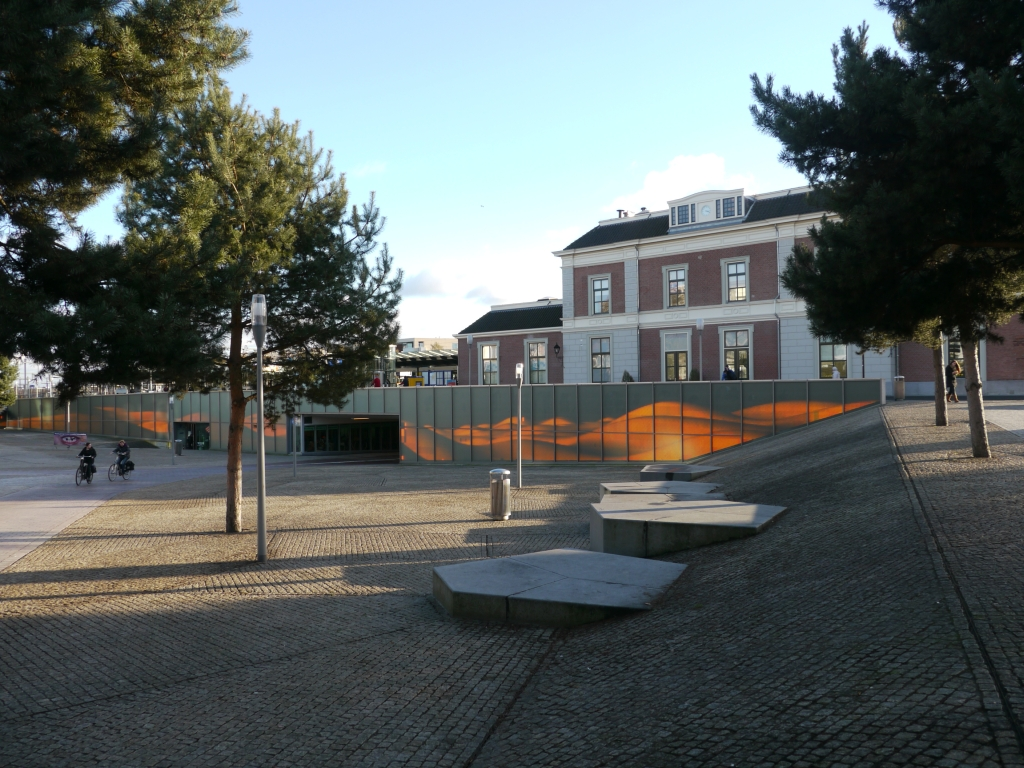
North façade of the building in 2011

The Apeldoorn station building is not related to any of the standard stations, but it has similarities with stations built in that period. It consists of an upper middle portion with two lower short side wings, eight tracks, and four platforms. The building previously included a royal waiting room for the Dutch monarchy. The building now contains a restaurant.

The 2004–2008 refurbishment included, closure of the level crossings at and near the station where passengers and cyclists would pass to get to Apeldoorn Zuid and opening of a new cycle tunnel under the station, railway and the adjacent road. The front square of the station was renewed in conjunction with this. There are also lifts to go up to the platforms.

== Services ==
=== Trains ===
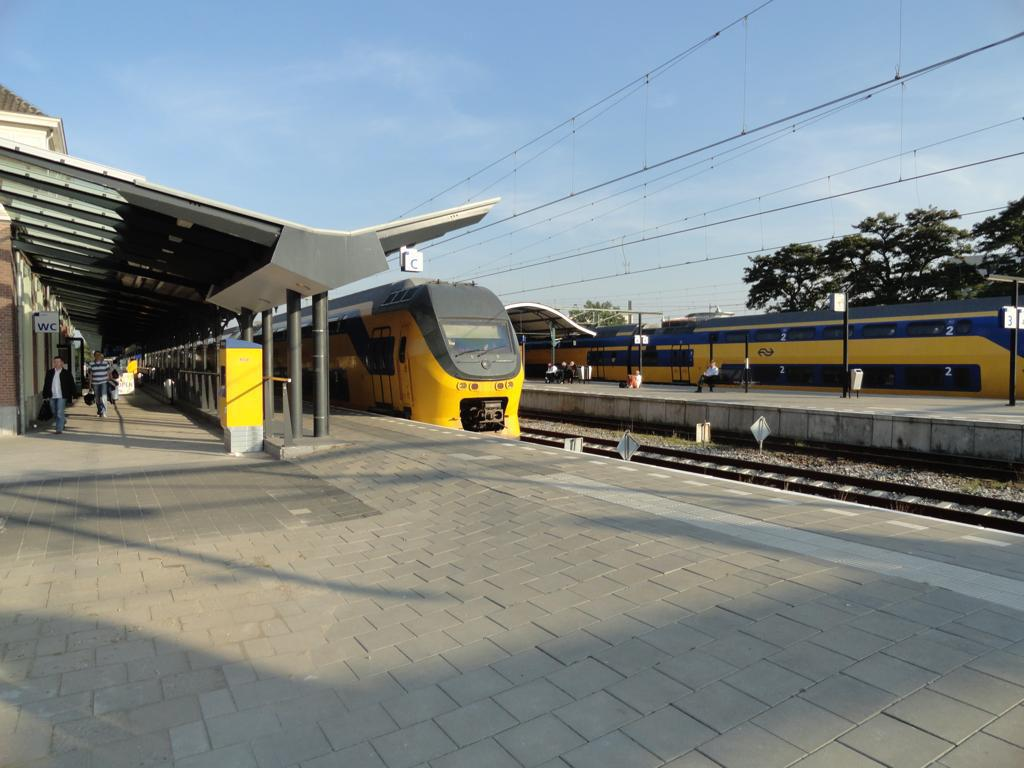
NS VIRM at the railway station in 2016

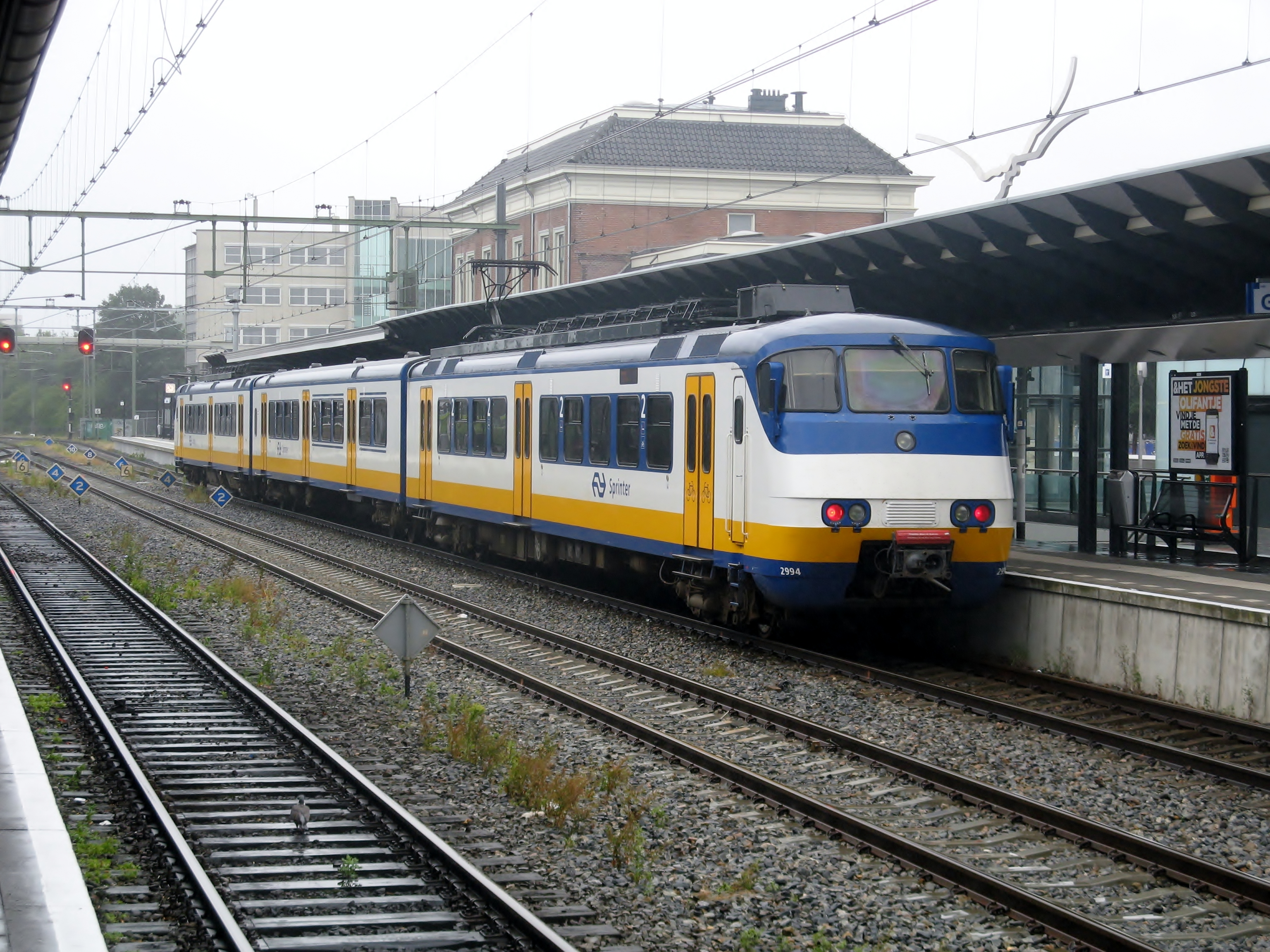
NS SGMm sprinter service at the railway station in 2011

As of October 2025, the following train services call at this station:

- Express services:
  - Intercity: Amsterdam - Hilversum - Amersfoort - Deventer - Hengelo - Bad Bentheim - Rheine - Osnabrück - Bünde - Hannover- Berlin
  - Intercity: The Hague/Rotterdam - (Gouda) - Utrecht - Amersfoort - Deventer - Almelo - Hengelo - Enschede
  - Intercity: Amsterdam - Hilversum - Amersfoort - Deventer
  - Sneltrein: Apeldoorn - Zutphen - Vorden - Ruurlo - Lichtenvoorde-Groenlo - Winterswijk West - Winterswijk
- Local services:
  - Sprinter: Apeldoorn - Osseveld - Twello - Deventer - Colmschate - Holten - Rijssen- Wierden - Almelo (- Hengelo - Enschede)
  - Stoptrein: Apeldoorn - De Maten - Klarenbeek - Voorst-Empe - Zutphen

From 9 December 2012, Arriva operates the train between Apeldoorn and Zutphen. From the same date Apeldoorn no longer had a direct connection with Rotterdam on weekdays; a change of trains was required in Amersfoort or Utrecht. In the 2015 timetable, however, the direct connection to Rotterdam on weekdays has been restored by splitting/combining trains in Utrecht. The intercity Amsterdam - Deventer calls at Apeldoorn every hour during weekdays and twice an hour during peak hours, however, not at the times the intercity Amsterdam - Berlin calls at Apeldoorn.

From 11 December 2016, the local Sprinter service to Almelo is only extended towards Enschede during weekday peak hours, where it used to be all day until 20:00 during weekdays. This change was implemented as a result of regional subsidies from the local Twente government being revoked, and led to strong protests from commuters and especially students at university and high schools in Enschede.

On 9 May 2025 Arriva started using their first renovated trains with the new RRReis livery. This change is done to create a single regional public transport brand in the provinces of Gelderland, Overijssel and Flevoland.

=== Buses ===
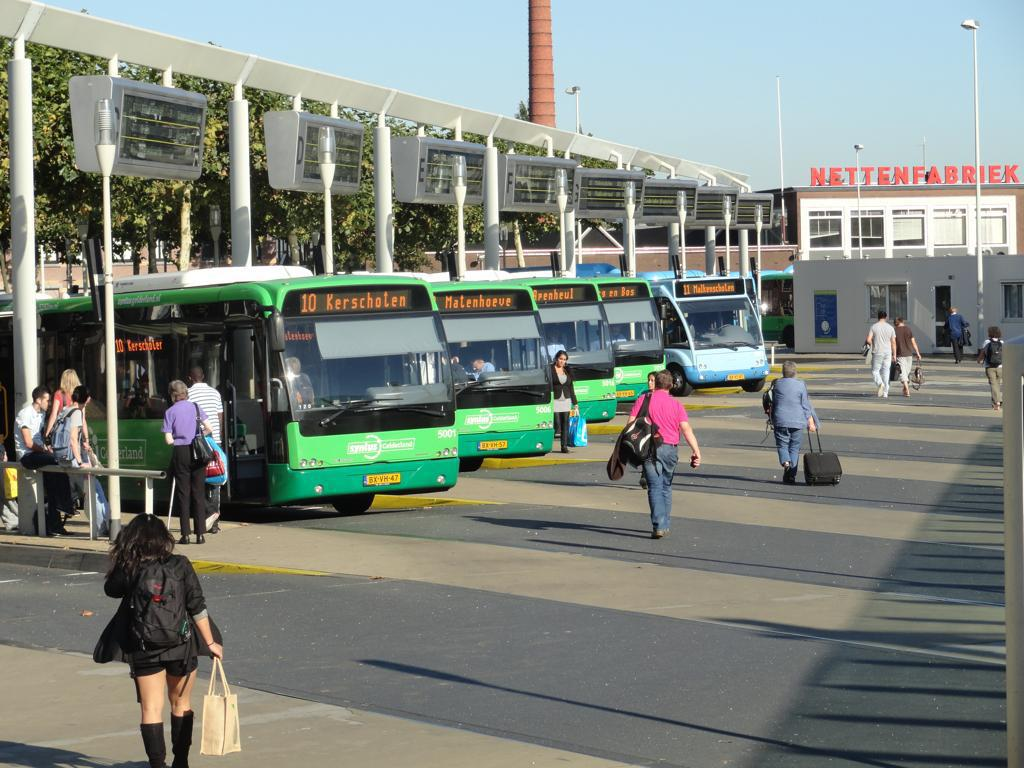
Apeldoorn bus station in 2016

There is a large bus station next to the station. From here town and regional bus services operate. These buses are operated by EBS under the RRReis brand, with certain journeys on service 43 operated by Hermes, also under the RRReis brand. All bus services are frequent and connect with train services.

==== Town services ====
- 1 Station - Town Centre - Gelre Ziekenhuis Lukas
- 2 Station - Town Centre - Rijkskantoren/Apenheul
- 3 Station - Town Centre - Zutphensestraat - Station De Maten - Matenhoeve - Matenveld
- 4 Station - Town Centre - Zutphensestraat - Station De Maten - Matenveld - Matenhoeve
- 5 Station - Deventerstraat - Osseveld - Woudhuis
- 6 Station - Town Centre - Rijkskantoren - Orden
- 7 Station - Town Centre - Orden
- 8 Station - Town Centre - Anklaar - Zuidbroek
- 9 Station - Town Centre - Anklaar - Zuidbroek
- 10 Station - Town Centre - Het Loo - Kerschoten
- 11 Station - Kerschoten - Stadshoudersmolen - Vaassen
- 12 Station - Town Centre - Ugchelen
- 14 Station - Town Centre - Arnhemseweg - Kayersmolen - Kayersdijk - Station
- 15 Station - Deventerstraat - Teuge - Twello
- 16 Station - Town Centre - Berg en Bos - Het Loo
- 17 Station - Town Centre - Sprenklaar - Station
- 18 Station - Town Centre - Arnhemseweg - Zuid - Rivierenkwartier - Station
- 19 Station - Zuid - Componistenkwartier - Town Centre - Station

==== Regional services ====
- 43 Apeldoorn - Beekbergen - Loenen - Eerbeek - Laag-Soeren - Dieren - Rheden - Velp - Westervoort - Arnhem (Faster service to Arnhem on service 91 or 231)
- 91 Apeldoorn - Beekbergen - Arnhem North - Arnhem
- 102 Apeldoorn - Het Loo Palace - Julianatoren - Nieuw Millingen - Wittenberg - Voorthuizen - Terschuur - Zwartebroek - Hoevelaken Station - Amersfoort
- 104 Apeldoorn - Het Loo Palace - Julianatoren - Hoog Soeren - Nieuw Millingen - Uddel - Elspeet - Leuvenum - Ermelo - Harderijk (Not weekends, use 102 to Voorthuizen and change onto service 105)
- 108 Apeldoorn - Ugchelen - Hoenderloo - Hoge Veluwe National Park - Otterlo - Ede - Ede-Wageningen
- 109 Apeldoorn - De Maten - Loenen - Eerbeek
- 201 Apeldoorn - Apeldoorn North - Zwolle Express
- 202 Apeldoorn - Wenum - Vaassen - Emst - Epe - Heerde - Zwolle
- 203 Apeldoorn - Apeldoorn North - Epe - Heerde - Hattem - Zwolle
- 231 Apeldoorn - De Maten - Arnhem (Not weekends)
- 293 Apeldoorn - De Maten - Arnhem North - Arnhem HAN (School Days only)
- 400 Veluwetour Operates to many towns throughout the Veluwe at weekends

== Passenger numbers ==
The numbers of passengers transported by NS (per average working day) starting from 2019:

Year	Number of passengers
2019	16.667
2020	7.379
2021	7.476
2022	11.266
2023	12.827
2024	12.590
2025	13.165
