= Apeldoorn–Zwolle railway =

Railway line in the Netherlands

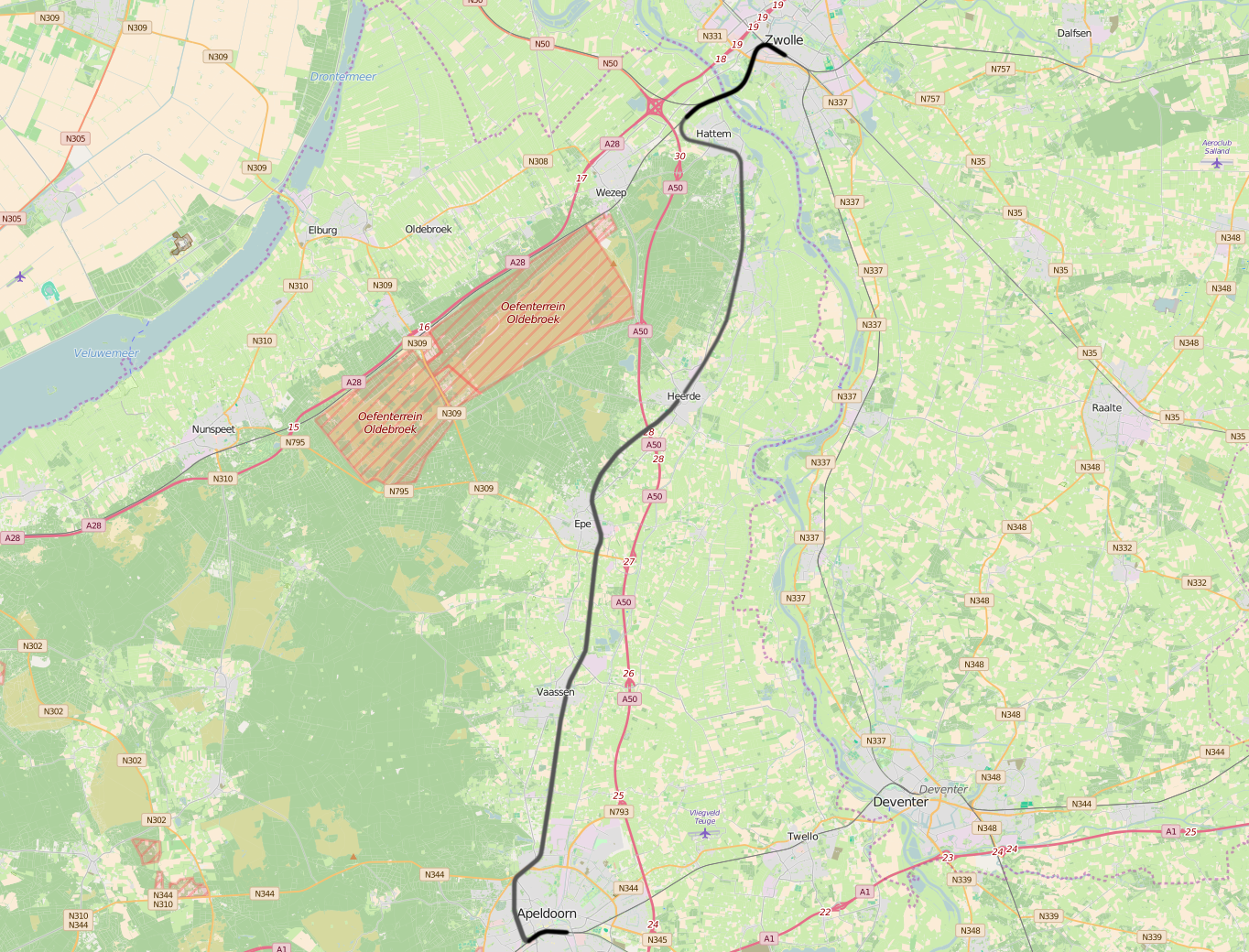

Overview
- Other name(s): Baron Line
- Status: Dismantled
- Owner: KNLS
- Termini: Apeldoorn; Zwolle
- Stations: 13

Service
- Operator(s): HSM

History
- Opened: 2 July 1887
- Closed: 10 October 1950

Technical
- Line length: 36.7 km (22.8 mi)
- Number of tracks: 1
- Track gauge: 1,435 mm (4 ft 8 1/2 in)

The Apeldoorn–Zwolle railway was a railway in the Netherlands connecting Apeldoorn, Gelderland with Zwolle, Overijssel. The railway was constructed by the Royal Netherlands Railway Company (Koninglijke Nederlandsche Locaalspoorweg-Maatschappij, KNLS) and opened between 1887 and 1889. The railway soon earned the nickname Baron Line, thanks to the number of nobles living along the line. The railway was closed in 1950 and largely dismantled in the 1970s.

== History ==
In 1876, royal palace Het Loo was connected to the Amsterdam–Zutphen railway. Via the Loolijn, the palace could be reached directly from Amsterdam Centraal. One year later, the Royal Dutch Local Rail Company (KNLS) was founded, which built several railways from Apeldoorn, including the railway to Zwolle. West of the Apeldoorn railway station, this new line connected to the Loo line. Just before the palace, the line split to Vaassen, Epe and Hattem. Near Wezep, the line merged into the Utrecht–Kampen railway of the Dutch Central Railway Company (NCS). This way, KLNS could use the existing railway bridge over the river IJssel.

In 1887, the section Apeldoorn-Hattem was opened. Trains terminated in a temporary station, close to the NCS Hattemerbroek railway station. The connection to the line to Zwolle was built in 1889. Trains were operated by the Dutch Iron Railway Company (HSM).

Passenger services were terminated on October 8, 1950. The section from Heerde to Wapenveld was immediately put out of service. In 1970, freight services between Wapenveld and Hattem were ended. The last freight trains between Hattem and Hattemerbroek and between Heerde and Apeldoorn rode in 1972. Soon after, the track was removed.

After the closure, passengers between Apeldoorn and Zwolle were serviced by buses of the Veluwe's Car Service (VAD). As of December 2010, Syntus's Veluwelijn provides the bus service.

== Stations and buildings ==
Most stations were so called Standard Stations by KNLS. Het Loo station was a unique design. In Apeldoorn and Hattemerbroek, the KNLS used the existing stations of HSM and NCS. In Epe, Heerde and Hattem, large station buildings of the type 1st Class were built. Vaassen railway station was of type 2nd Class. Emst and Wapenveld were 3rd Class. Kampen Zuid was built in the style of HSM stations, but this building was demolished after just twenty years. Apart from Wapenveld, Heerde and Vaassen, all station building were razed after the closure of the railway line.

== Present day ==
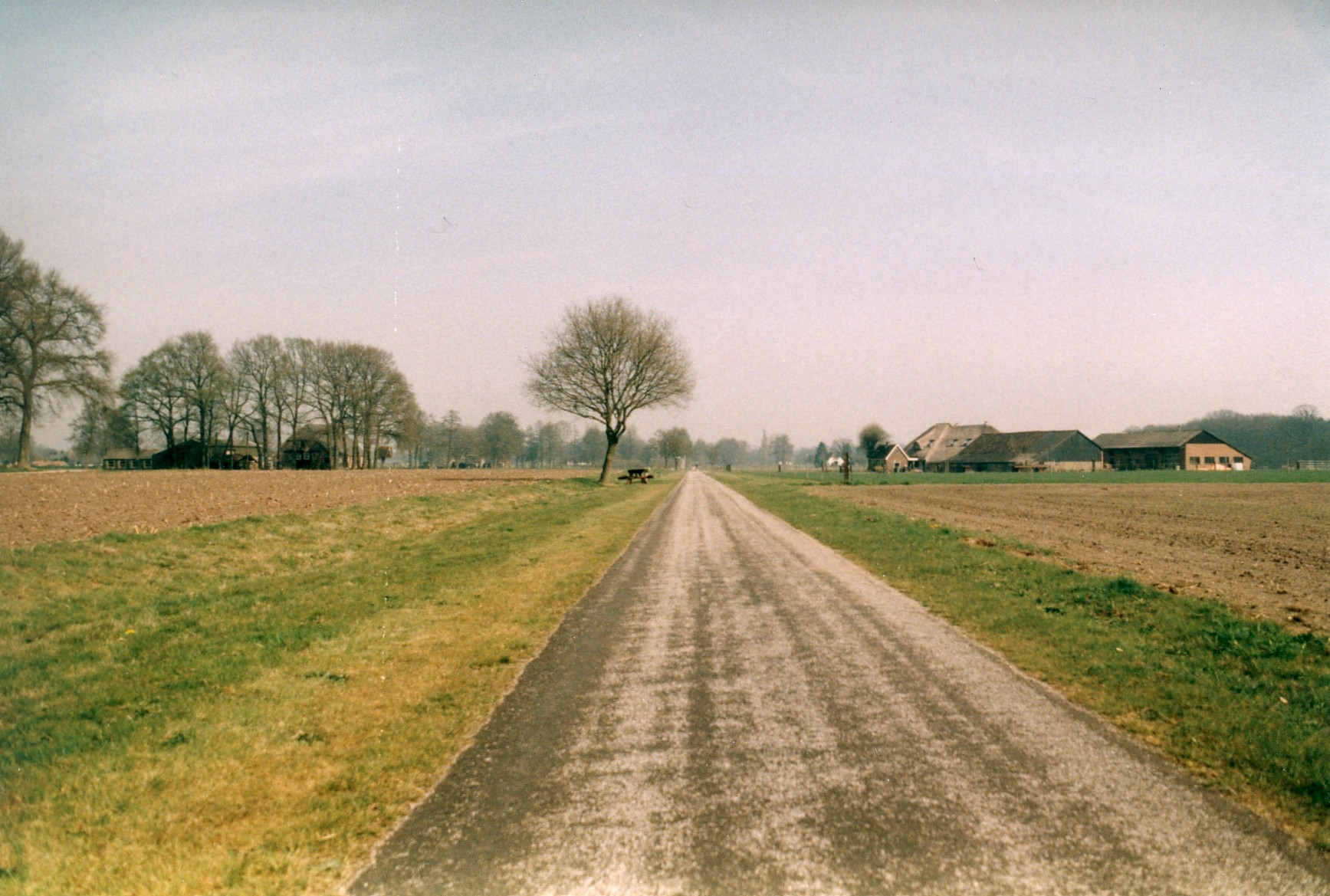
The former railway, currently in use as a bike trail near Emst, April 2003

Many recognizable objects have survived the closure of the railway line. In Apeldoorn, two connecting curves are now in use as footpaths and several signalmen's homes are still standing. Outside of Apeldoorn, almost the entire railway is converted into bike paths.

== Bibliography ==
Veenendaal, Augustus J. Jr. (2001). Railways in the Netherlands: a brief history, 1834-1994. Stanford, Calif.: Stanford Univ. Press. ISBN 0804739471.
