= Apeldoorn Osseveld railway station =

Railway station in the Netherlands

Apeldoorn Osseveld
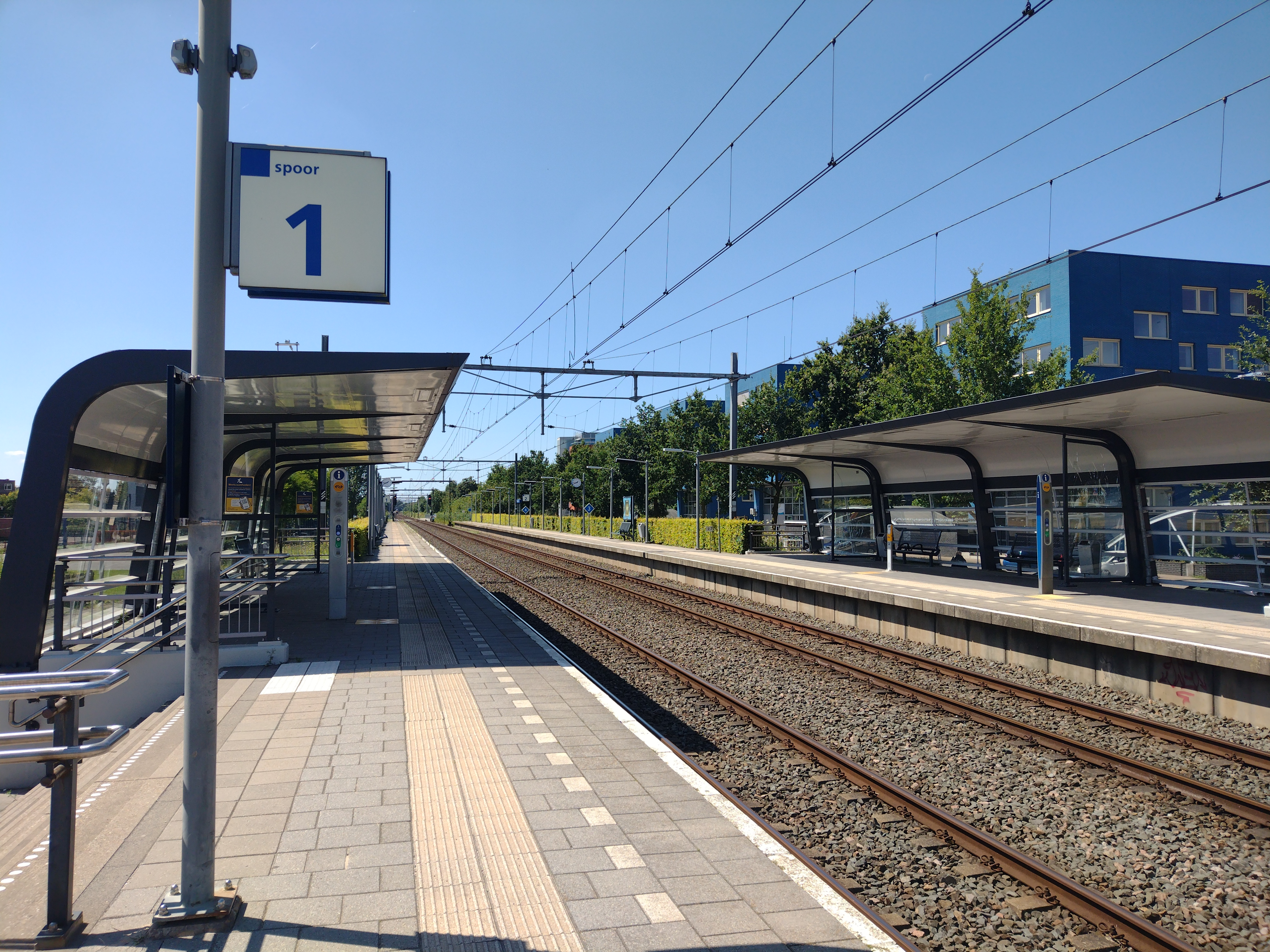
- The station in 2024.

General information
- Coordinates: 52°12′56″N 6°00′18″E
- Operator: NS Stations
- Line: Apeldoorn–Deventer railway
- Platforms: 2
- Tracks: 2
- Train operators: Nederlandse Spoorwegen

Construction
- Cycle facilities: Free bicycle parking and paid bicycle lockers on both sides.
- Accessible: The station features stair-free entrances.

Other information
- Station code: Apdo
- Website: ns.nl/stationsinformatie/apdo/apeldoorn-osseveld

History
- Opened: 10 December 2006

Passengers
- 1.104 in 2024.

Services
Preceding station	Nederlandse Spoorwegen	Following station
Apeldoorn Terminus	NS Sprinter 7000 Ends at Almelo in off-peak hours.	Twello towards Enschede
Location

Apeldoorn Osseveld is a railway station located in Apeldoorn, Netherlands. The station was opened on 10 December 2006 and is located on the Apeldoorn–Deventer railway. The services is operated by Nederlandse Spoorwegen.

== Facilities ==
The station has two platforms, free bicycle parking, paid Bicycle lockers and a nearby bus stop where line 5 stops. The stop is called Talma Borgh and is approximately 400 metres south of the station along the Ravelijn.

== Train services ==
As of October 2025, the following train services call at this station:

- Local Sprinter service: Apeldoorn - Twello - Deventer - Colmschate - Holten - Rijssen - Wierden - Almelo (- Hengelo - Enschede)

This service continues towards Enschede during weekday peak hours only.

== History ==
This station was part of an project to improve the public transport in the 'Stedendriehoek' region. The station was constructed and opened alongside the station of Twello, Apeldoorn De Maten and Voorst-Empe.

== Pictures ==
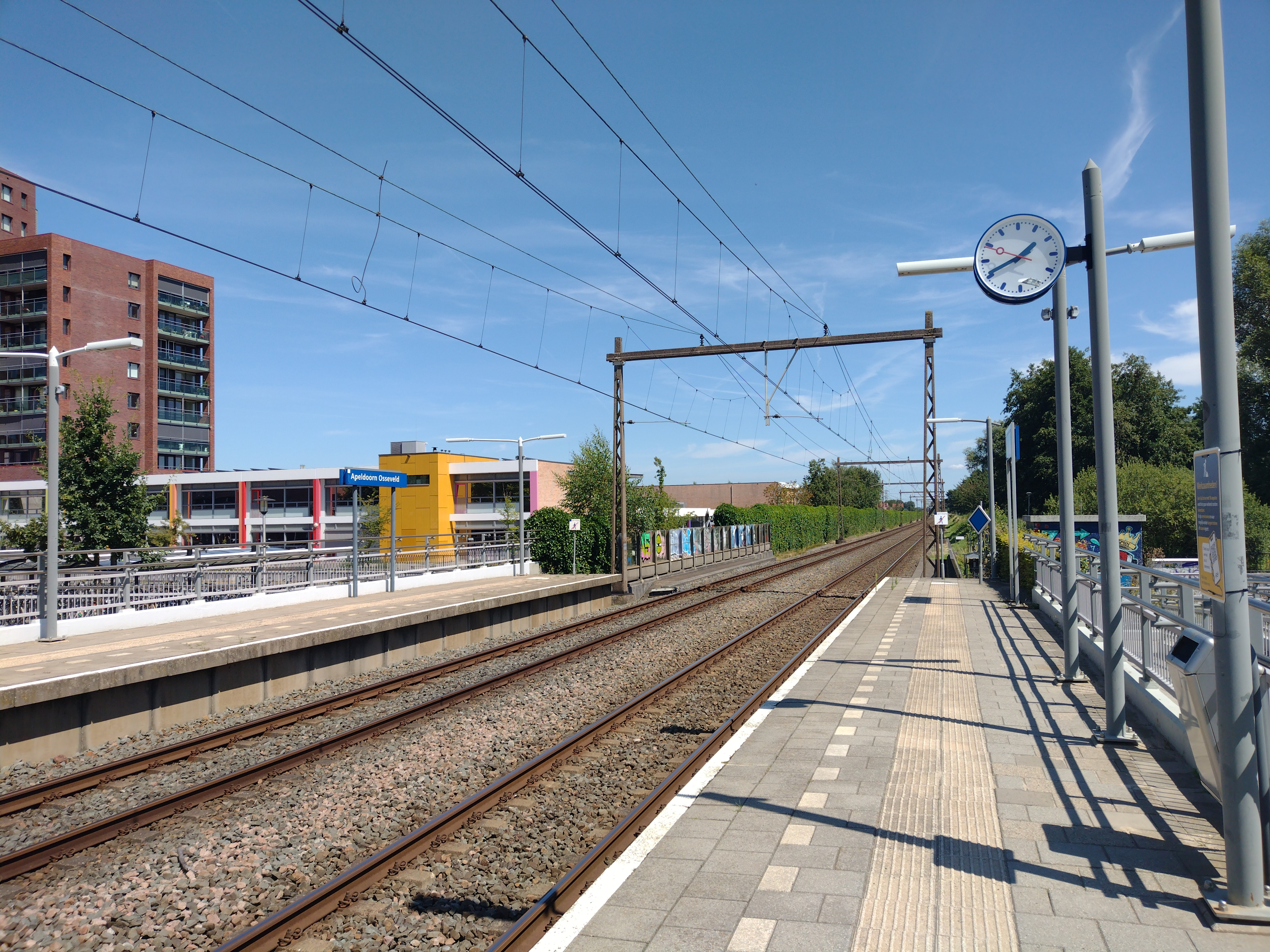
The station in 2024 facing north.

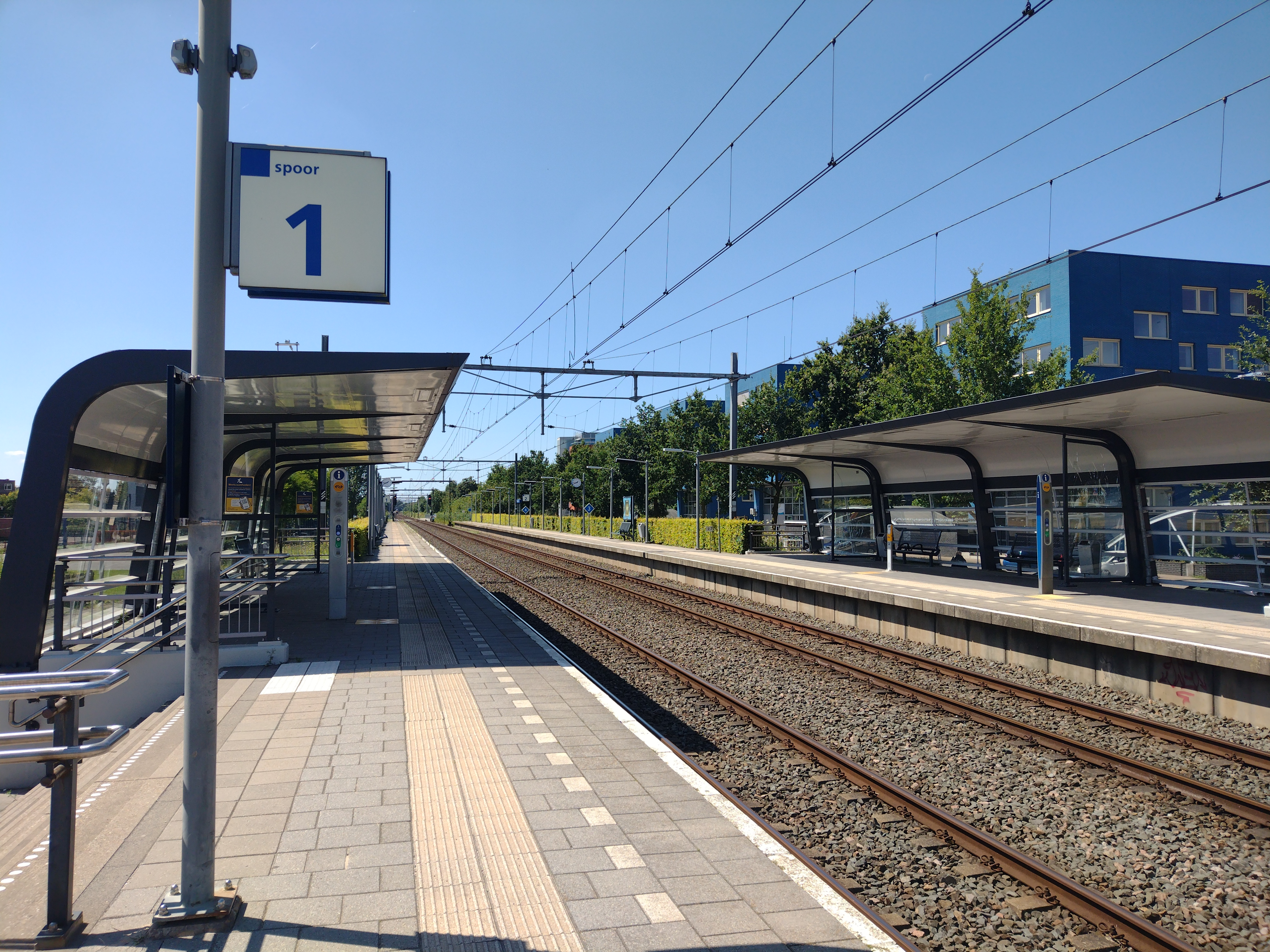
The station in 2024 facing south.

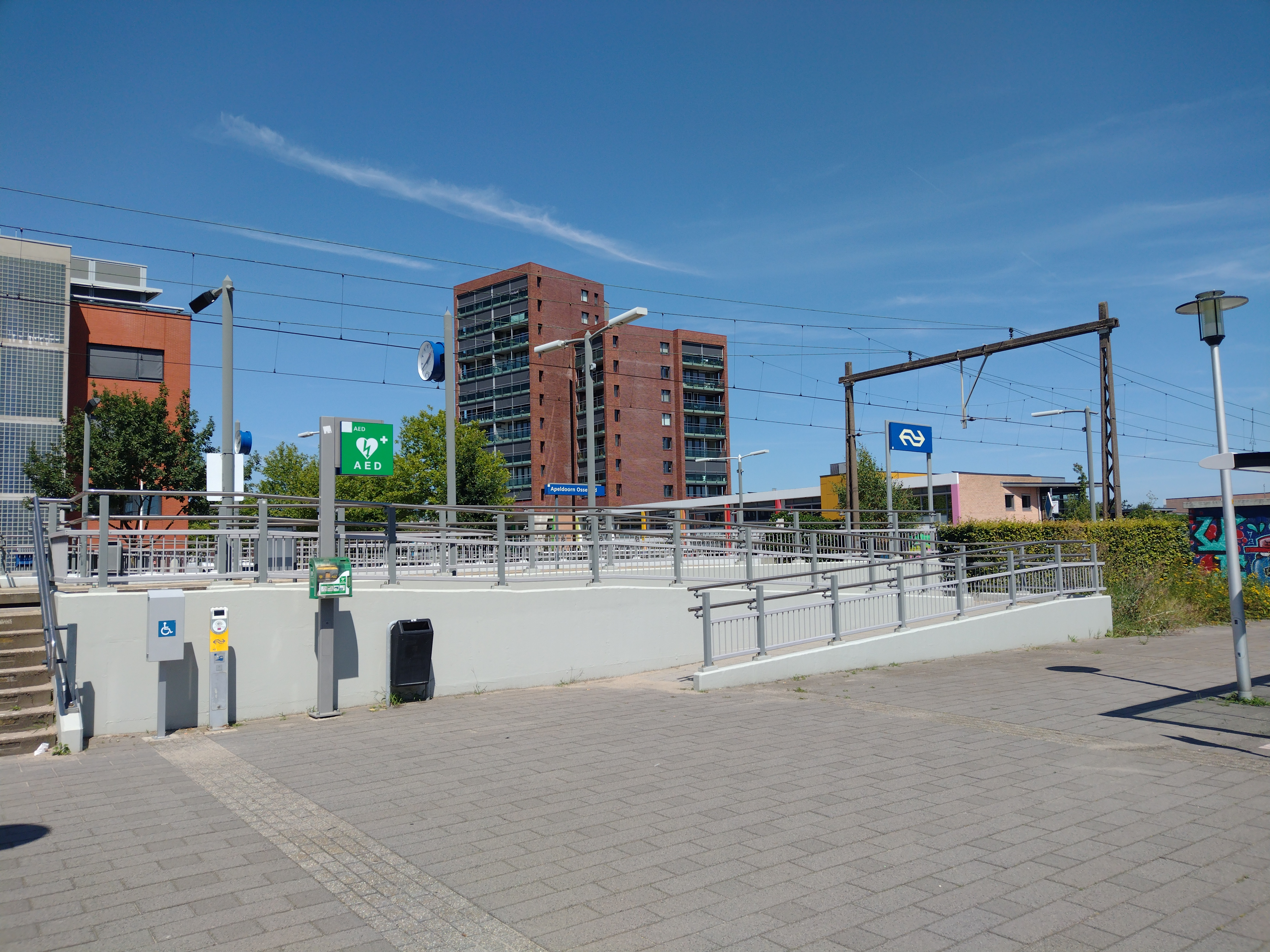
Stair free entrance at platform 1.

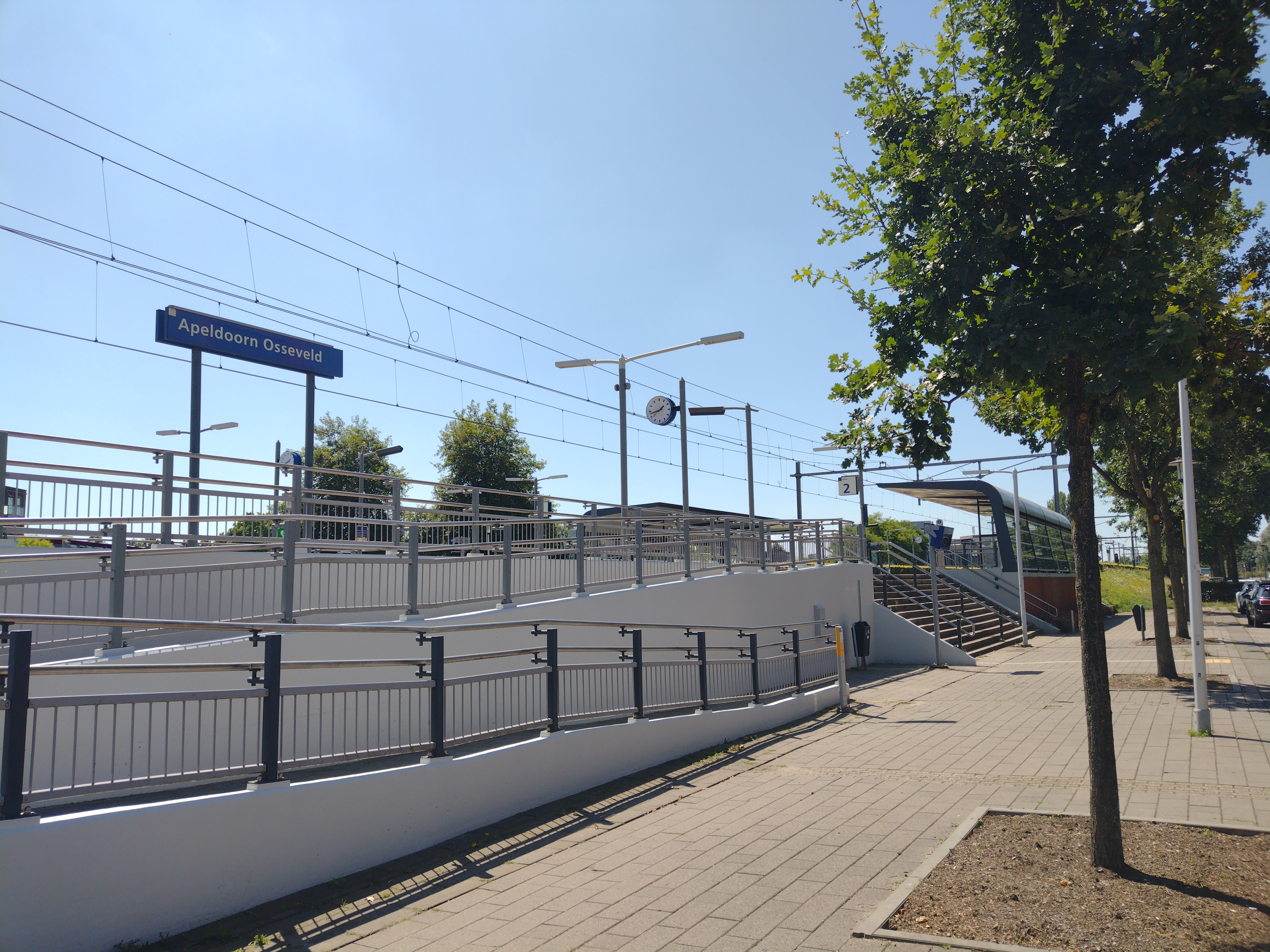
Stair free entrance at platform 2.

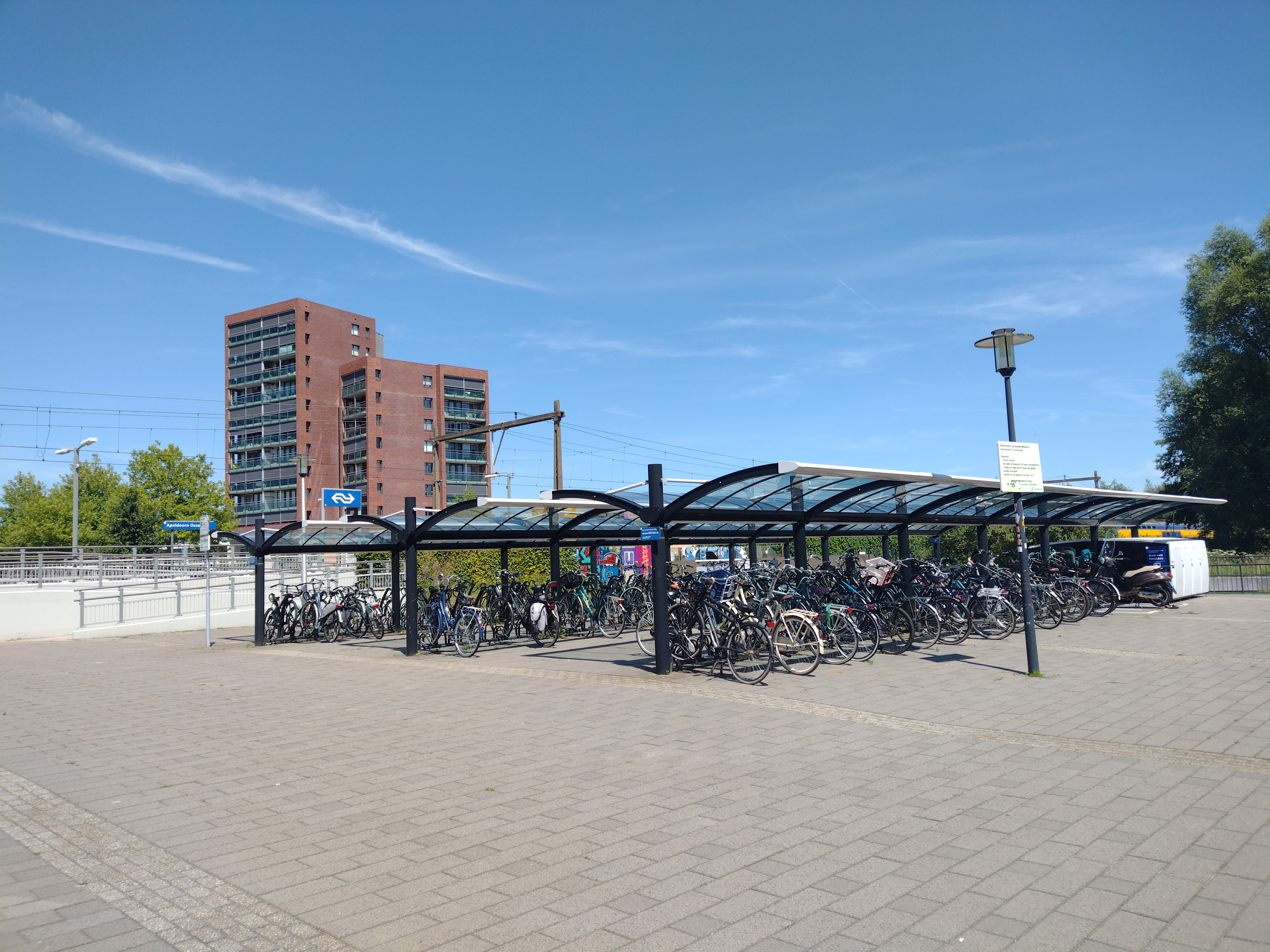
Free bicycle parking at platform 1.

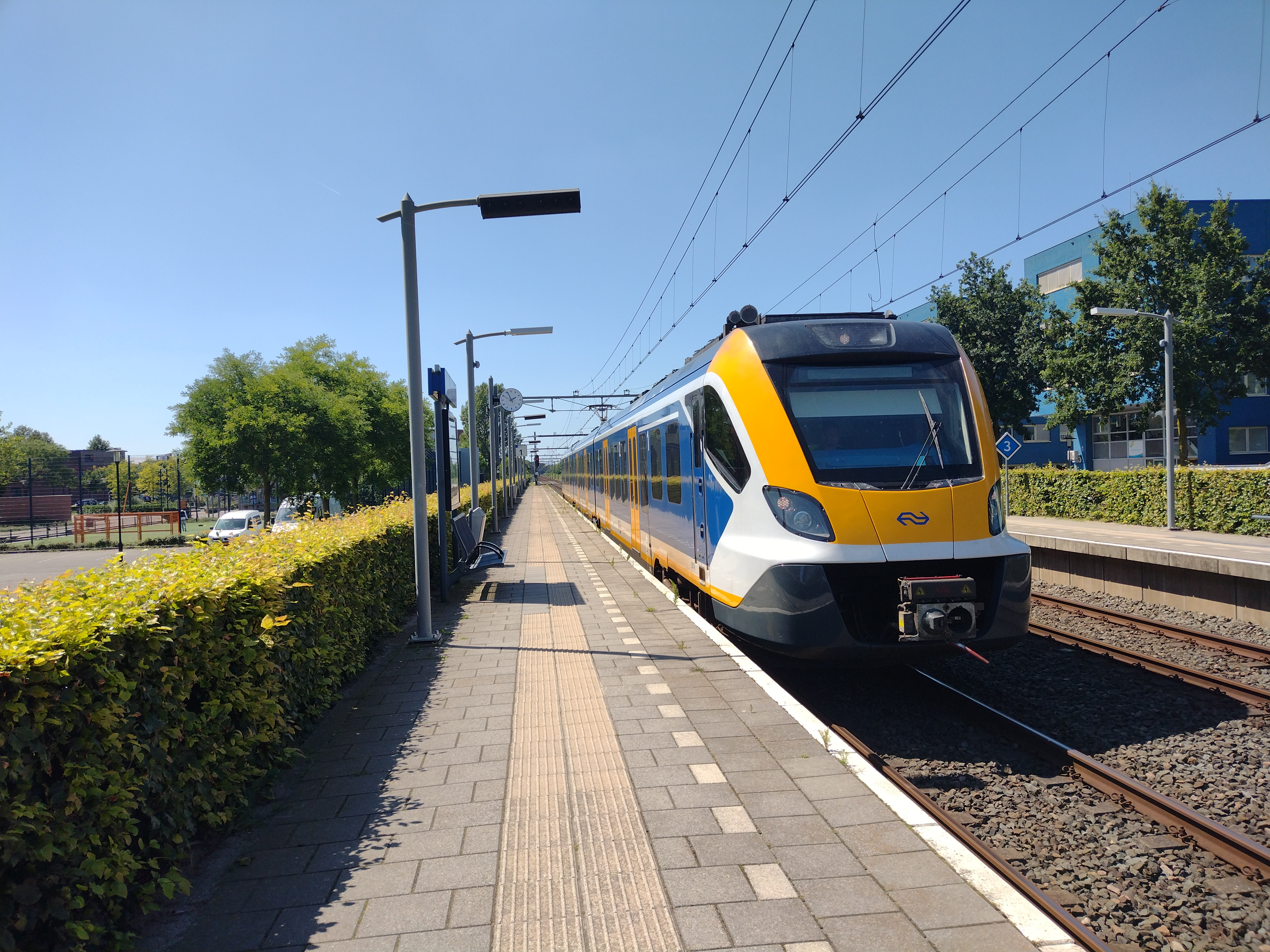
NS SNG on platform 1.

== Passenger numbers ==
The numbers of passengers transported by NS (per average working day) starting from 2019:

Year	Number of passengers
2019	1.289
2020	613
2021	684
2022	889
2023	1.092
2024	1.104
