= Deventer railway station =

Railway station in Deventer, Netherlands

Deventer
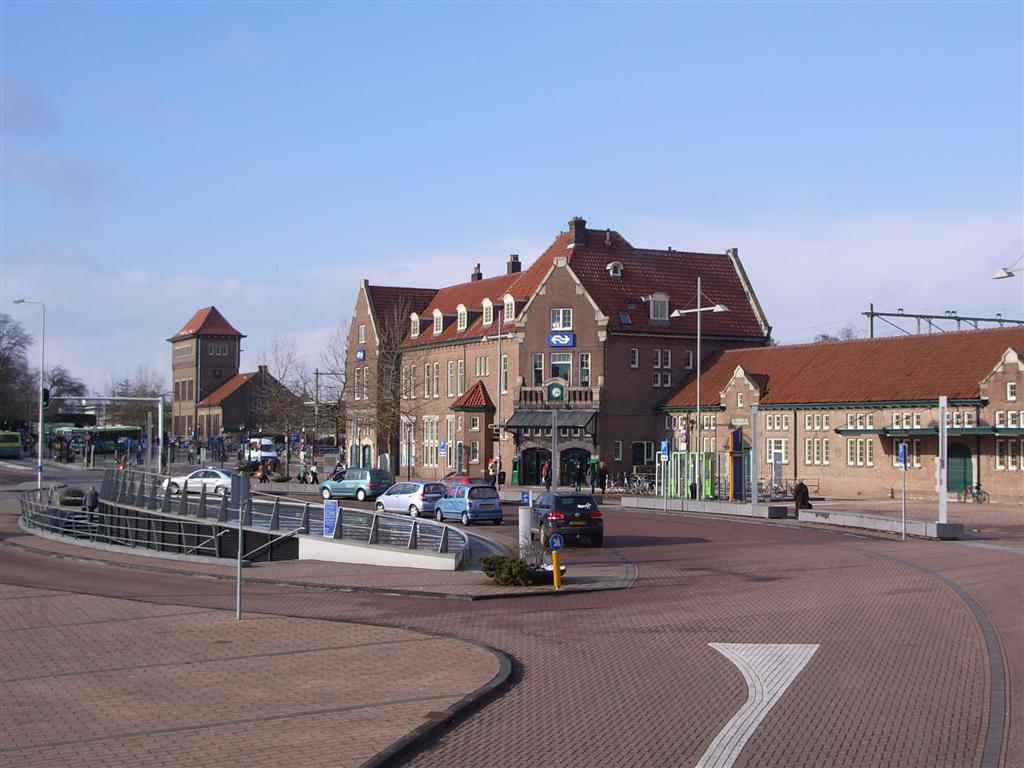

General information
- Location: Deventer, Netherlands
- Coordinates: 52°15′26″N 6°9′39″E
- Lines: Apeldoorn–Deventer railway Deventer–Almelo railway Arnhem–Leeuwarden railway

History
- Opened: 5 August 1865
Services
Preceding station	DB Fernverkehr	Following station
Apeldoorn towards Amsterdam Centraal	ICE 77	Hengelo towards Berlin Ostbahnhof
Preceding station	ÖBB	Following station
Amersfoort Centraal towards Amsterdam Centraal	Nightjet	Münster Hbf towards Innsbruck Hbf or Wien Hbf
Preceding station	European Sleeper	Following station
Amersfoort Centraal towards Brussels-South	Brussels - Prague	Berlin Zoologischer Garten towards Prague
Preceding station	Nederlandse Spoorwegen	Following station
Apeldoorn towards Amsterdam Centraal	NS Intercity 1500	Almelo towards Deventer
Apeldoorn towards Den Haag Centraal	NS Intercity 1700	Terminus
Apeldoorn towards Rotterdam Centraal	NS Intercity 1700	Almelo towards Enschede
Olst towards Zwolle	NS Intercity 3600	Zutphen towards Roosendaal
Twello towards Apeldoorn	NS Sprinter 7000	Deventer Colmschate towards Enschede
Location
- Location within Netherlands

Deventer is a railway station in Deventer, Netherlands. The station was opened on 5 August 1865 and is on the Apeldoorn–Deventer railway, Deventer–Almelo railway and the Arnhem–Leeuwarden railway. The train services are operated by Nederlandse Spoorwegen.

== History ==
In 1860 the state decided to connect the largest towns and cities in the Netherlands with each other. The railway between Arnhem, Zutphen, Deventer, Zwolle, Heerenveen and Leeuwarden was known as State railway A. When the station opened in 1865 it was connected with Arnhem and in 1861 the line to Zwolle opened.

More than 20 years later, in 1887, the railway between Apeldoorn and Deventer opened. A year later this was extended to Almelo. The Arnhem–Zwolle railway and Apeldoorn–Almelo railway were operated by competing companies which resulted in two separate stations being built.

The station was also the terminus of the OLDO, a local railway to Raalte and Ommen which opened in 1910 and closed in 1935. Around the time this line was opened, the other two railways were altered, raising them above ground level to avoid conflicts with road traffic. This is also when the combined station was built for all the railway lines. The current building dates from 1914 and the island platforms were built in 1920.

In 1892, when the line between Apeldoorn and Almelo was upgraded to a main line, it became an important east–west connection. It was decided in 1917 to add a second track on this line. Shortly afterwards the Zwolle to Zutphen line was also doubled. The lines were electrified in the 1950s. This made the station an important interchange from all directions. The station was also on the international route between the western part of the Netherlands and Germany. The Almelo-Salzbergen railway was connected with the line from Apeldoorn in 1892. This meant trains could operate from Amsterdam, Hook of Holland and Rotterdam to Germany, Scandinavia and Russia. Names of these trains included the Holland-Scandinavië Express, Nord-West Express and Hoek-Warszawa Express. The trains had carriages for destinations such as Berlin, Warsaw, Copenhagen and Moscow. From 1991 an increasing number of trains operated through to Berlin and in 1993 the final international train operated from the Hook of Holland. Today there is a train every two hours between Amsterdam and Berlin, operating via Deventer. Until December 2010, one of these trains ran to the Polish city of Szczecin.

== Train services ==
In the 2020 timetable the following train services call at this station:

- 7 tpd (trains per day) express Intercity service: Amsterdam - Amersfoort - Hengelo - Osnabrück - Hanover - Berlin
- 2 tph express Intercity service: The Hague - Utrecht - Amersfoort - Hengelo - Enschede
- 2 tph express Intercity service: Zwolle - Arnhem - Nijmegen - 's-Hertogenbosch - Roosendaal
- 2 tph local Sprinter service: Apeldoorn - Deventer - Almelo (- Enschede in weekday peak hours); reduced service on evenings and weekends
- 3 train pairs per week European Sleeper service: Brussels - Amsterdam - Berlin - Prague

during peak hours additional Intercity train between Amersfoort - Apeldoorn - Deventer.

In March 2026 GoVolta services began calling.

== Bus services ==
There is a small bus station next to the station. Many town services stop there as well as regional bus services. All services are operated by Syntus.

=== Town services ===
- 1 Station - Rivierenwijk - Runshop Snipperling - Colmschaterenk - Blauwenoord
- 2 Station - Keizerslanden - Borgele - Platvoet
- 3 Station - Diepenveensweg - Zandweerd Noord - Platvoet
- 4 Station - Zwolseweg - Keizerslanden - Wezenland - Schalkhaar - Heeten
- 5 Station - Hospital - Vijfhoek - Colmschate mall & railway
- 6 Station - De Snippeling - Colmschate Zuid
- 7 Station - Bergweide - Kloosterlanden - De Snippeling - Station
- 8 Station - Town Centre Shuttle

=== Regional services ===
- 56 Deventer - Harfsen - Laren - Lochem - Barchem - Borculo
- 81 Deventer - Epse - Gorssel - Eefde - Zutphen
- 160 Deventer - Bathmen (- Holten)
- 161 Deventer - Diepenveen - Boskamp - Olst - Den Nul - Wijhe - Zwolle
- 165 Deventer - Wesepe - Raalte
- 171 Deventer - Twello

== Facilities ==
The station has car parking facilities under the Leeuwenbrug building and close to the Saxion University site. There is a free cycle parking facility underground where bikes can also be hired. Taxi's and buses are at the front of the station. The station features a small convenience store and a book shop. Outside the station are a cafe, a fast food restaurant, and other hospitality businesses.

== Modernisation ==
The fact that the station had just one island platform caused capacity issues at the station for a number of years. In preparation for a large scale modernisation of the station, Deventer gained a temporary third platform on 15 June 2008, placed over the rarely used track 1. This made it possible for 4 trains an hour to operate between Deventer and the west of the country. On 15 June 2014 the permanent Platform 1 was introduced, replacing the temporary platform. The platform features a lift.

The outside area of the station is also being rebuilt. It is an important point for the city and region with 18,000 people entering and leaving the station every day. The city decided to improve the route towards the city centre and improve the cycle parking facilities. The new underground cycle park opened in November 2015 and has a capacity for 3600 bikes. The station gained OV-chipkaart ticket barriers in the summer of 2015. A new bus station was built in 2016.
