= Apeldoorn De Maten railway station =

Railway station located in Apeldoorn, The Netherlands

Apeldoorn De Maten
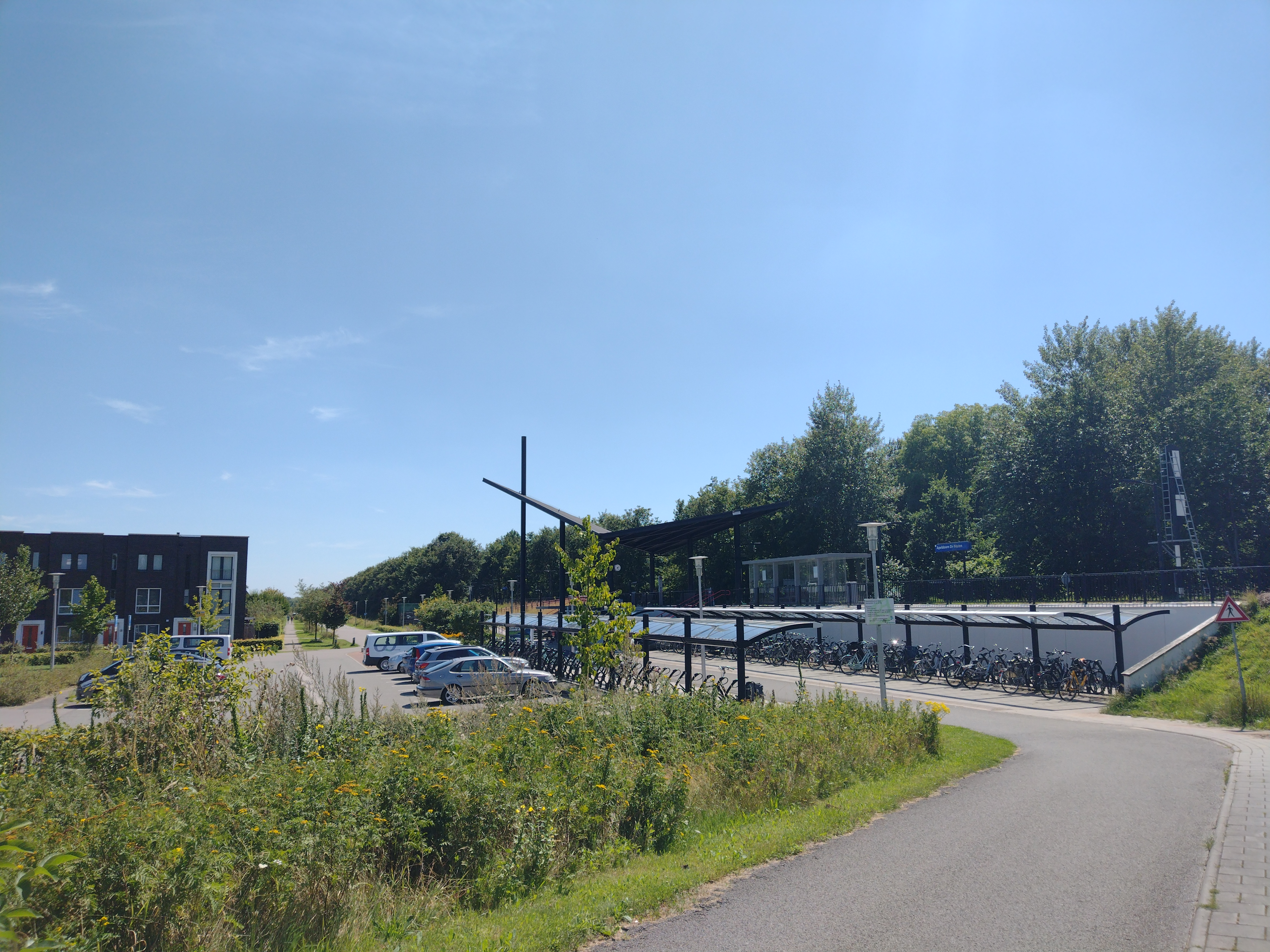
- Station Apeldoorn De Maten

General information
- Coordinates: 52°12′N 6°00′E
- Operator: NS Stations
- Line: Amsterdam–Zutphen railway
- Platforms: 1
- Tracks: 1
- Train operators: Arriva
- Bus operators: EBS

Construction
- Parking: Free P+R.
- Cycle facilities: Free bicycle parking and paid Bicycle lockers.
- Accessible: The station features an stair-free entrance.

Other information
- Station code: Apdm
- Website: ns.nl/stationsinformatie/apdm/apeldoorn-de-maten

History
- Opened: 10 December 2006

Passengers
- 612 in 2009.

Services
Preceding station	Arriva Netherlands	Following station
Apeldoorn Terminus	Stoptrein 17800	Klarenbeek towards Zutphen
Location

Apeldoorn De Maten is a railway station located in Apeldoorn, Netherlands. The station was opened on 10 December 2006 and is located on the Amsterdam–Zutphen railway between Apeldoorn and Zutphen. The services are operated by Arriva.

== History ==
The station was opened on 10 December 2006. It was constructed and opened at the same time as the stations Apeldoorn Osseveld, Twello and Voorst-Empe.

Arriva began operating trains at this station on 9 December 2012, after RegioNS lost the service tender to Arriva.

== Facilities ==
The station has a single track line, with one platform. In front of the station is a park and ride, free bicycle parking with paid bicycle lockers and an accessible public toilet.

== Train services ==
The following services currently call at Apeldoorn De Maten:

- 2x per hour local services (stoptrein) Apeldoorn - Zutphen

On 9 May 2025 Arriva started using their first renovated trains with the new RRReis livery. This change is done to create a single regional public transport brand in the provinces of Gelderland, Overijssel and Flevoland.

== Bus connections ==
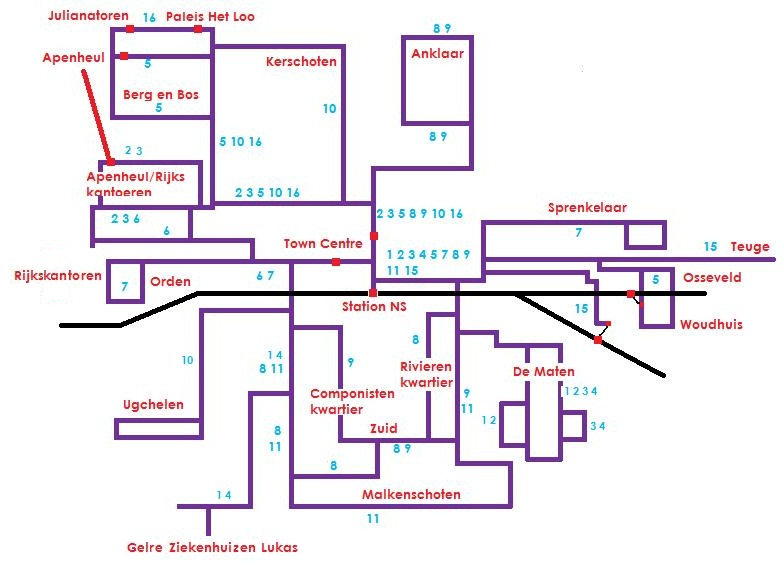
The bus network of Apeldoorn town services

The following bus services also stop near the station.

- 3 Station - Town Centre - Zutphensestraat - Station De Maten - Matenhoeve - Matenveld
- 4 Station - Town Centre - Zutphensestraat - Station De Maten - Matenveld - Matenhoeve

== Pictures ==
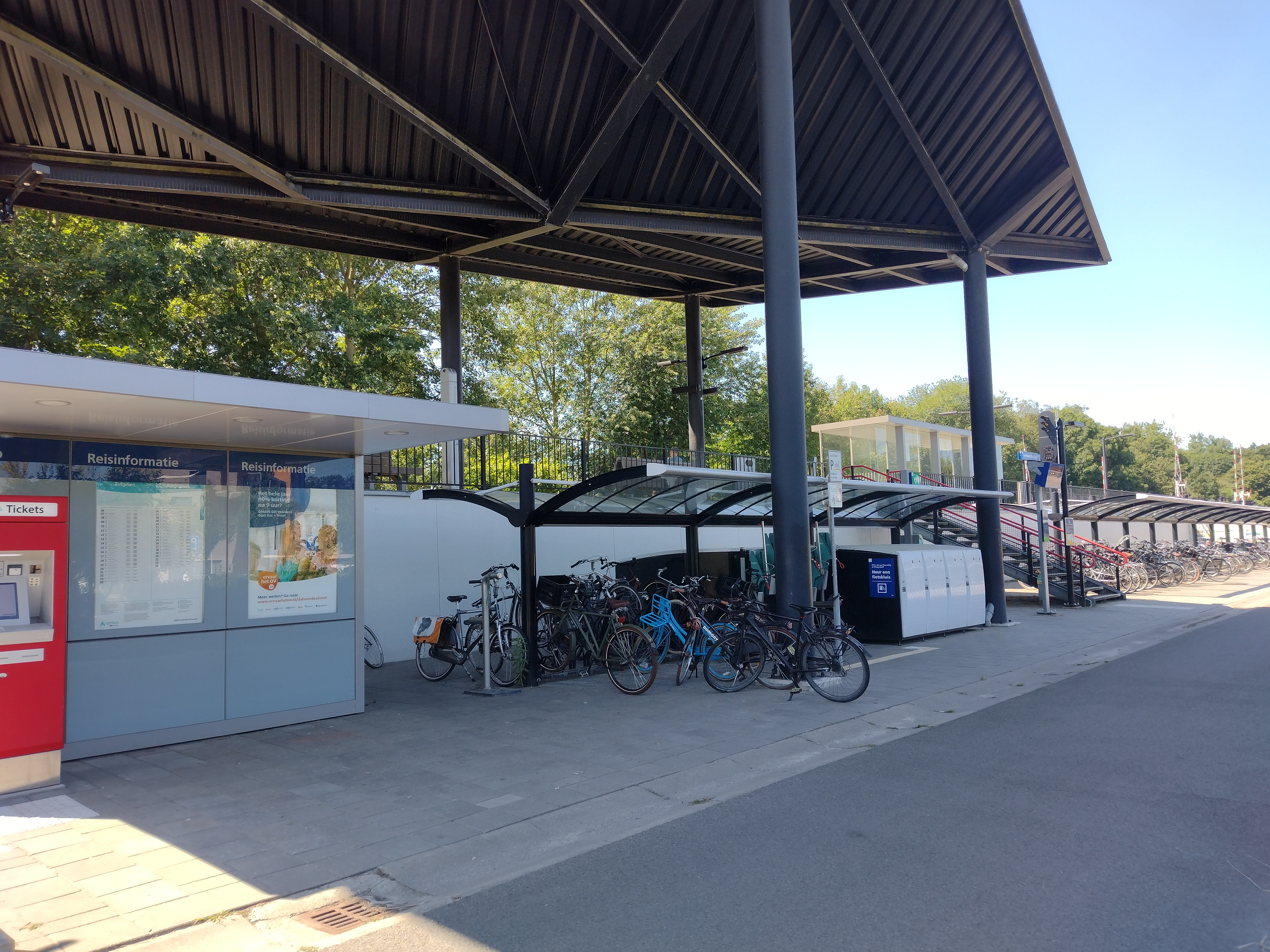
Ticket machine & bicycle parking.

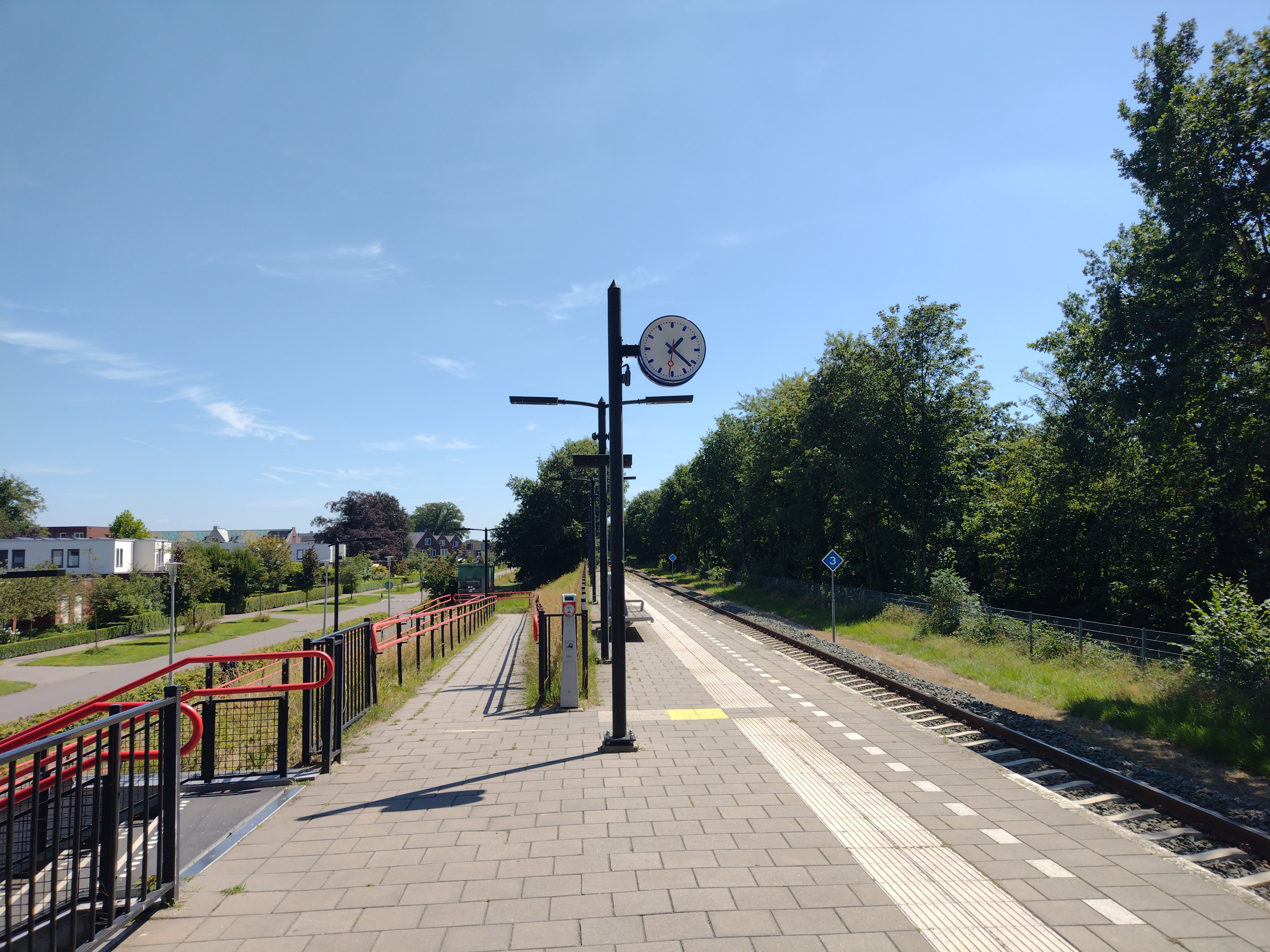

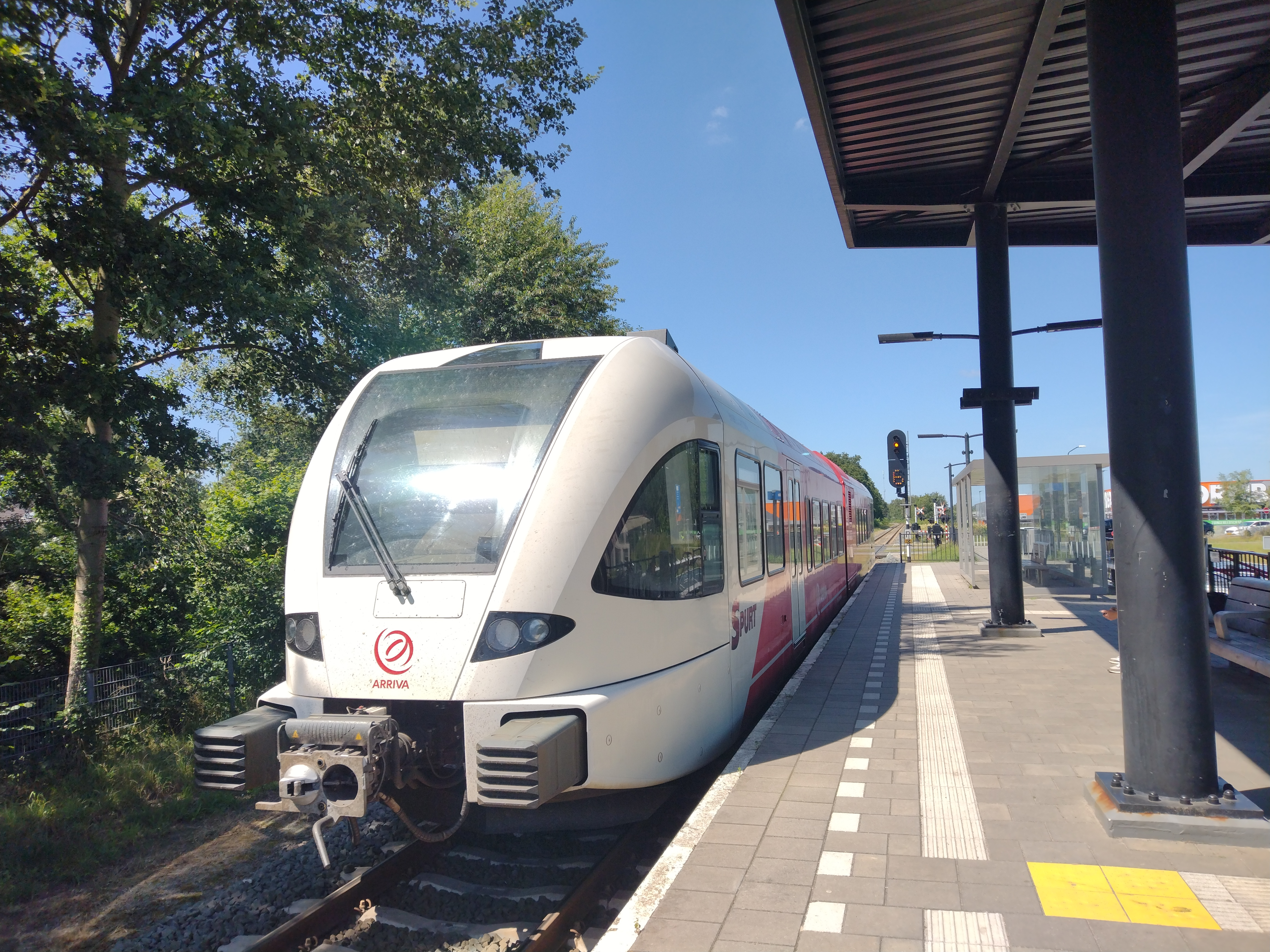
An Arriva Stadler GTW waiting on the platform.

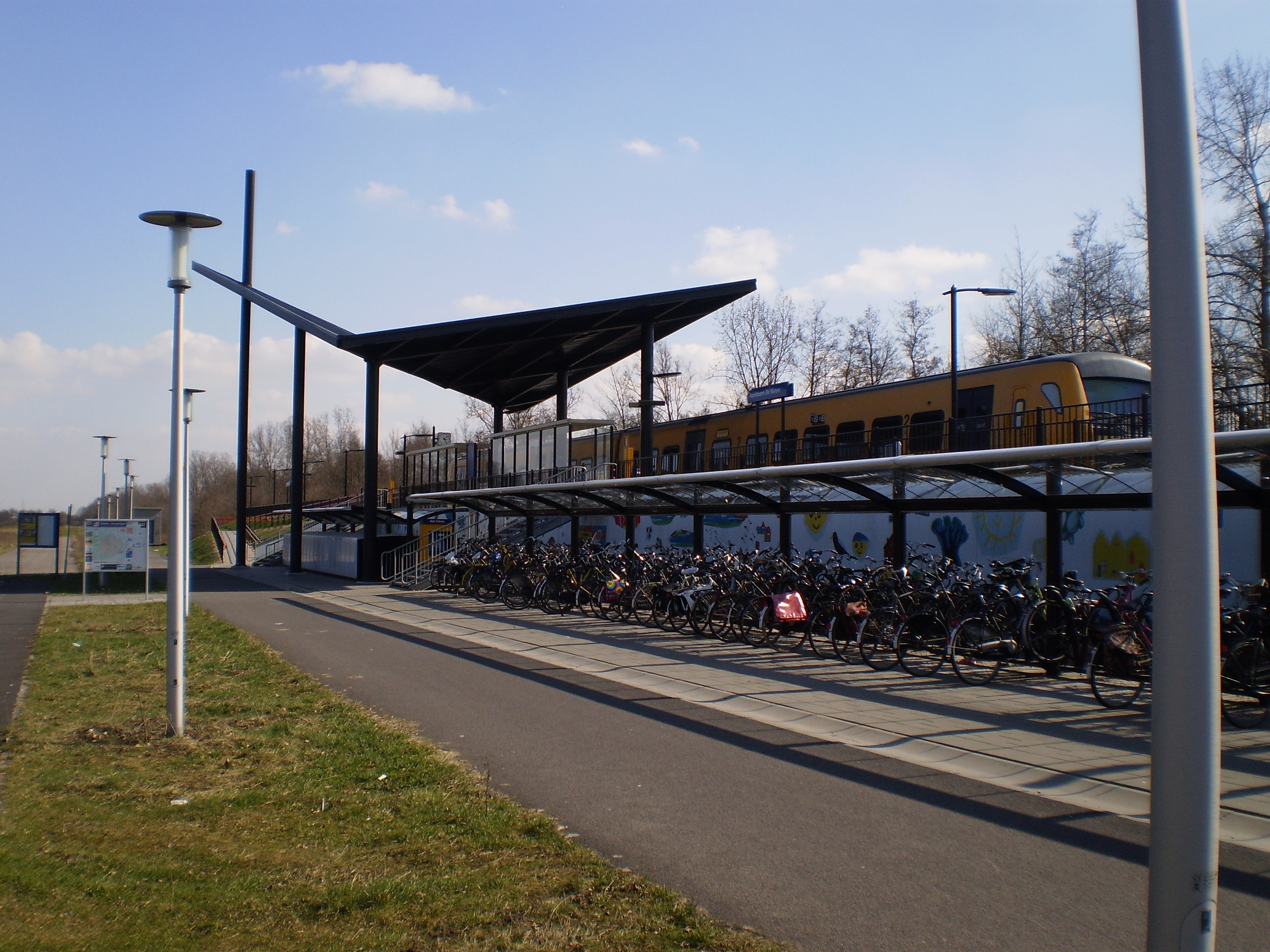
An RegioNS DM 90 waiting at the station.
