= OV-fiets =

Bike-rental program in the Netherlands

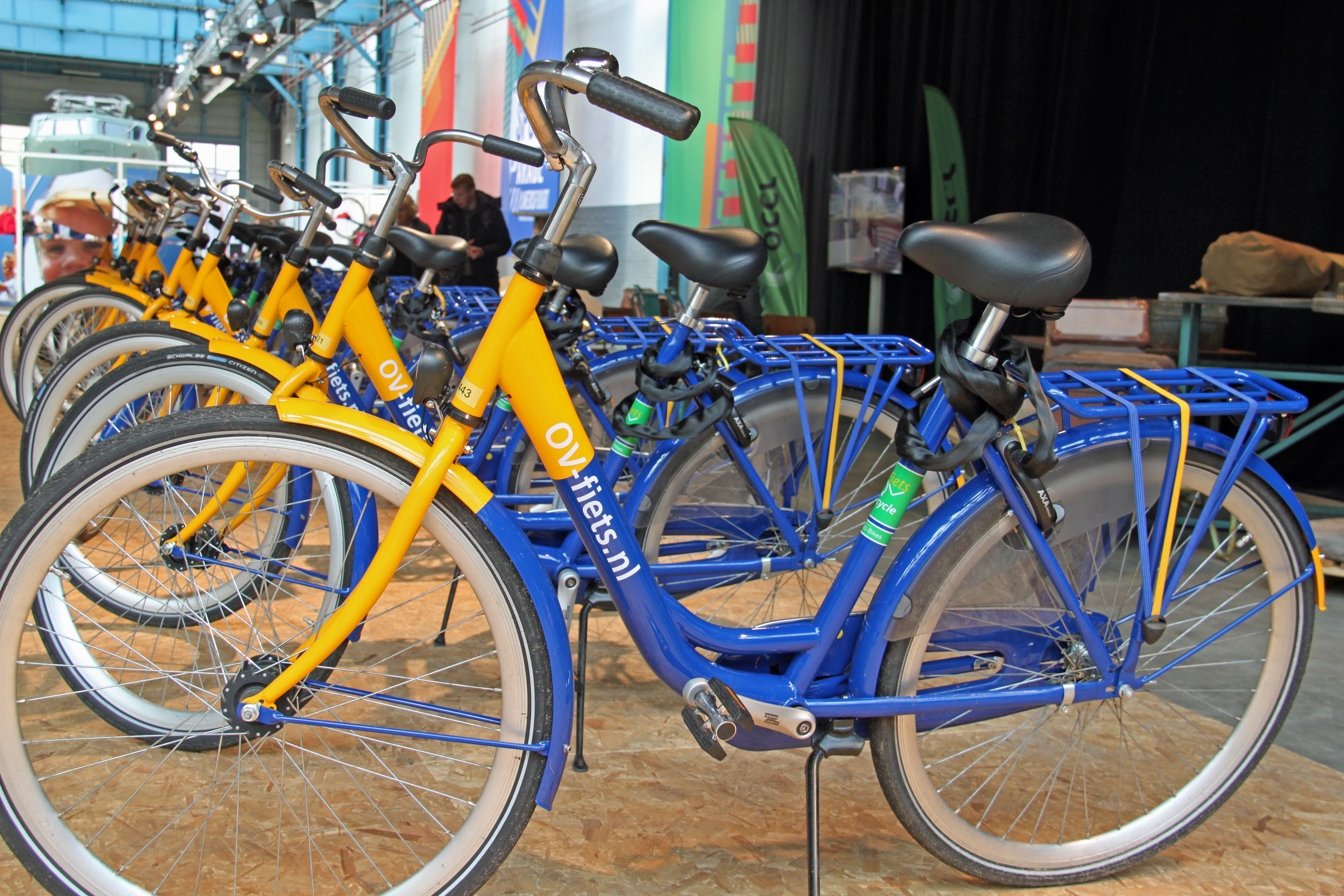

Overview
- Locale: Netherlands
- Transit type: Bicycle sharing system
- Number of stations: 282 (2024)
- Annual ridership: 5.9 million (2024)
- Website: http://www.ov-fiets.nl/

Operation
- Began operation: 2003
- Number of vehicles: 22.120 (2024)

OV-fiets is a nationwide bike-sharing program in the Netherlands. The system has 22,000 bikes in 282 locations mainly train stations, all over the country. A membership is required and requires the use of an OV-chipkaart. The program, which started on a small scale in 2003, has enjoyed a steadily increasing popularity with over 5.9 million rides registered in 2024.

The program's interconnection with the public transport network allows the country's many bicycle owners to use that network for part of their trip.

== Statistics ==
Year	Locations	Members	Bikes	E-Bikes	Rides
2004	70	11.000	800		100.000
2005	84	20.000	1.300		189.000
2006	101	30.000	2.500		250.000
2007	140	43.000	3.000		335.000
2008	182	51.000			480.000
2009	200	67.000	4.500		670.000
2010	226	85.109	5.000		850.136
2011	230	100.000	6.000		1.000.000
2012	240	140.000			1.225.000
2013	250	160.000			1.335.000
2014	252	180.000	8.500		1.530.000
2015	277	177.000			1.900.000
2016	290	200.000	8.500		2.400.000
2017	300	500.000	14.500		3.200.000
2018			22.500		4.200.000
2019			20.000		5.300.000
2020	305		21.700		3.100.000
2021	295		22.000		3.400.000
2022	291		21.500	90	5.400.000
2023	288		22.500		5.900.000
2024	282		22.000	120	5.900.000

== Photo gallery ==
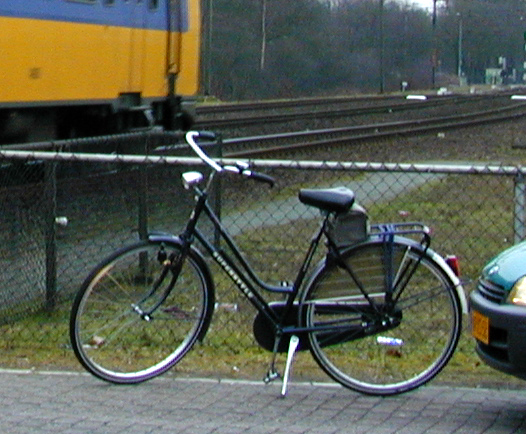
First OV-fiets model

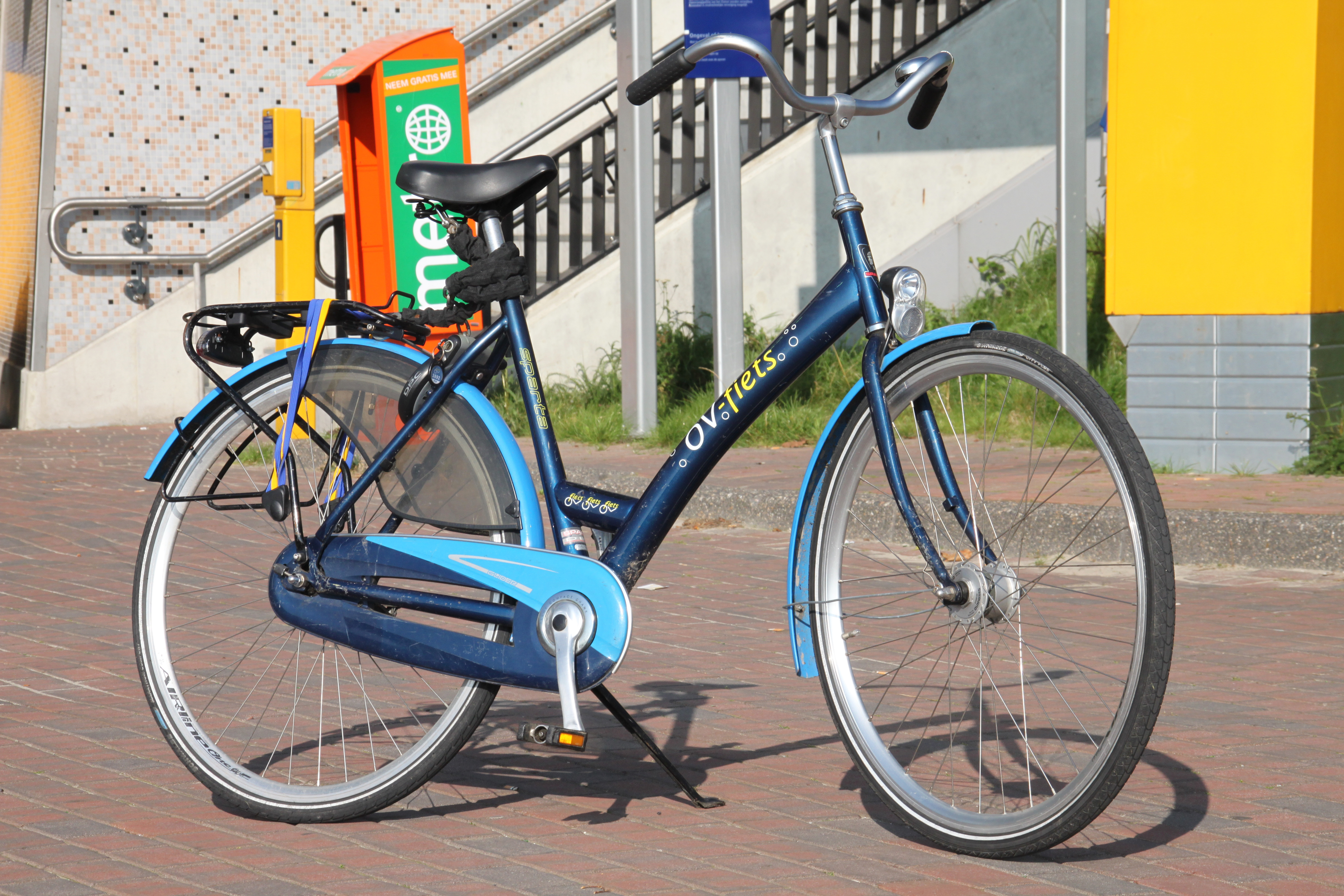
Second OV-fiets model

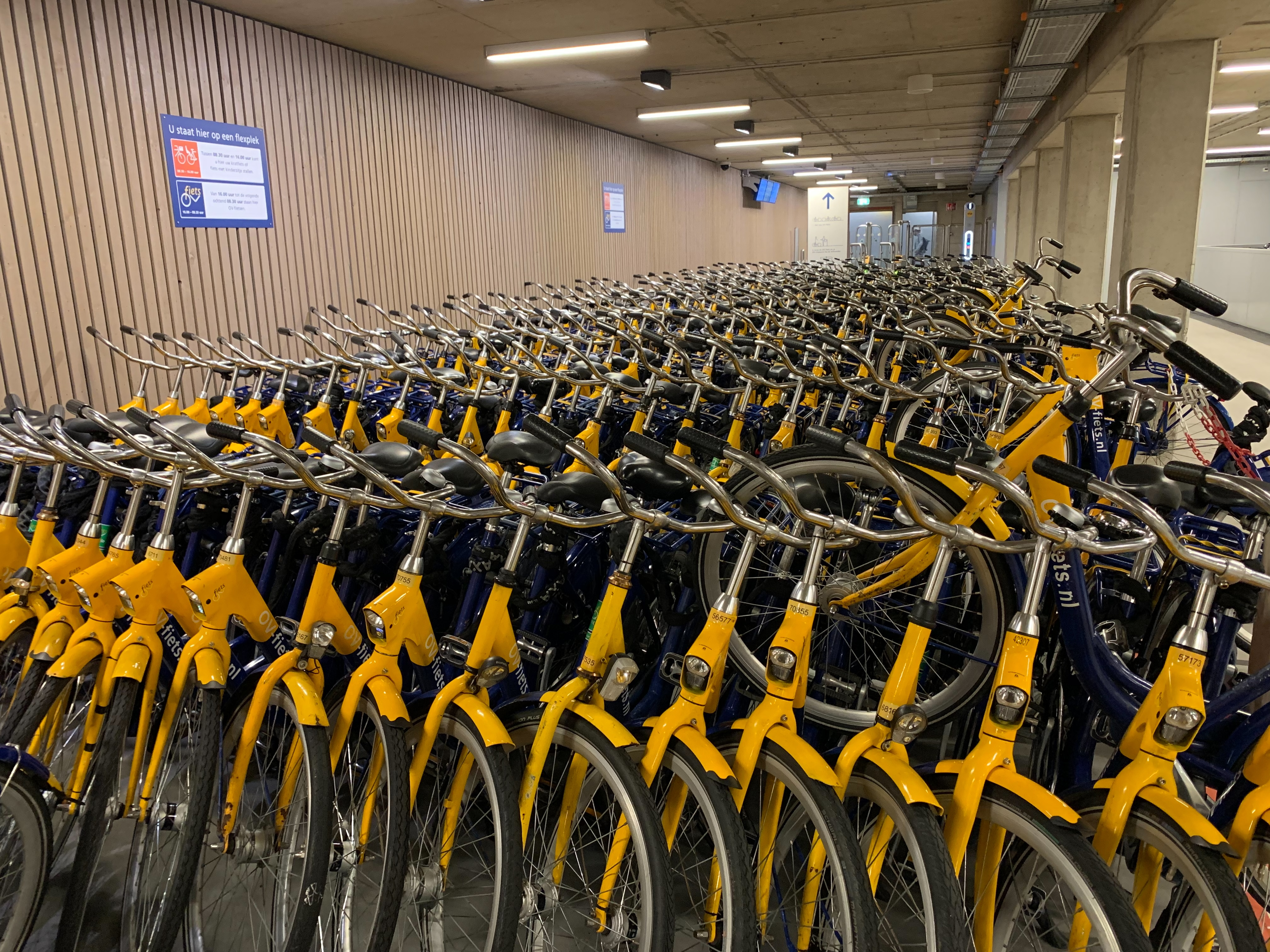
OV-fiets parking in Utrecht at central station.

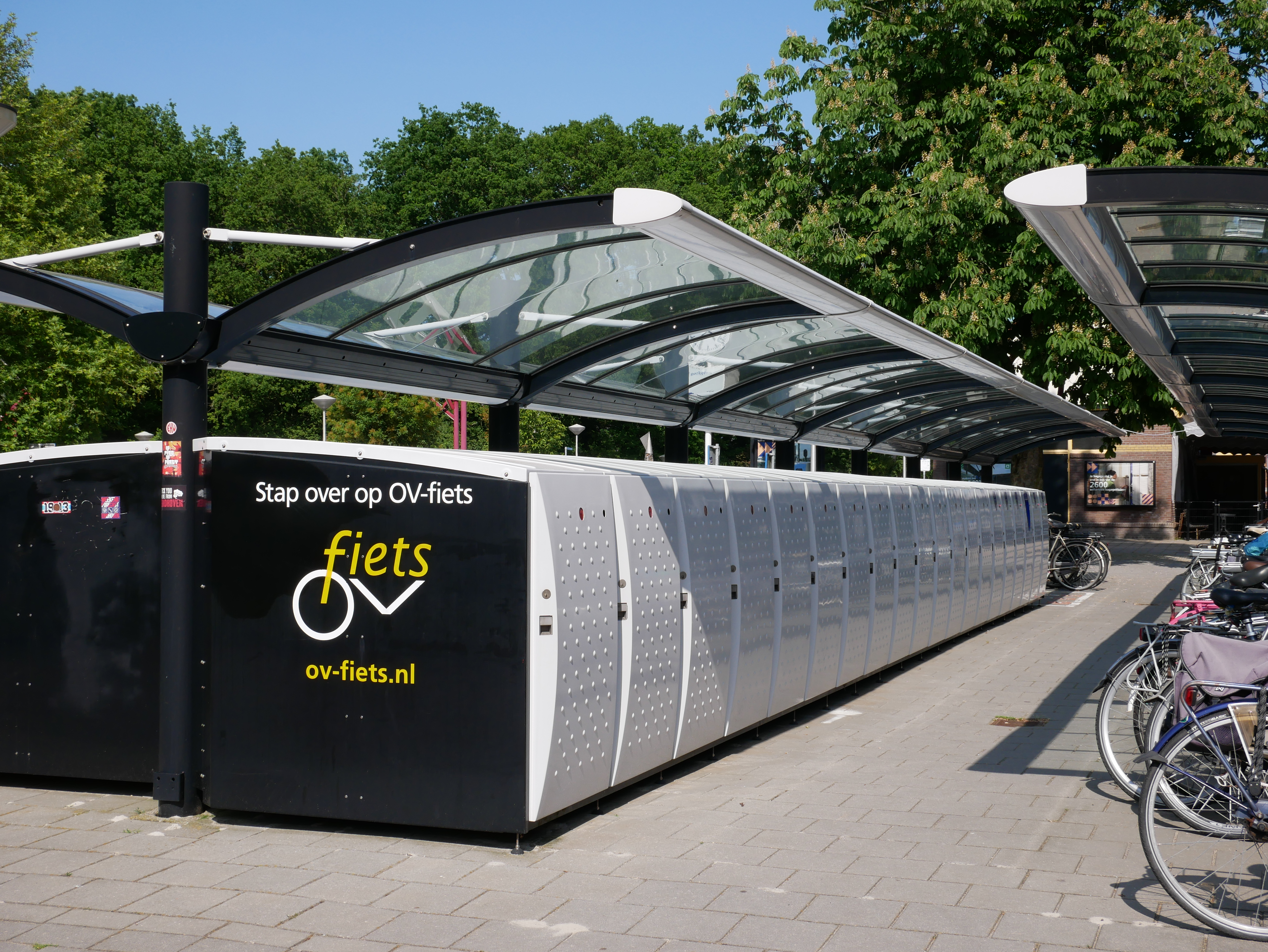
Automatic stall from OV-fiets at Ommen train station.

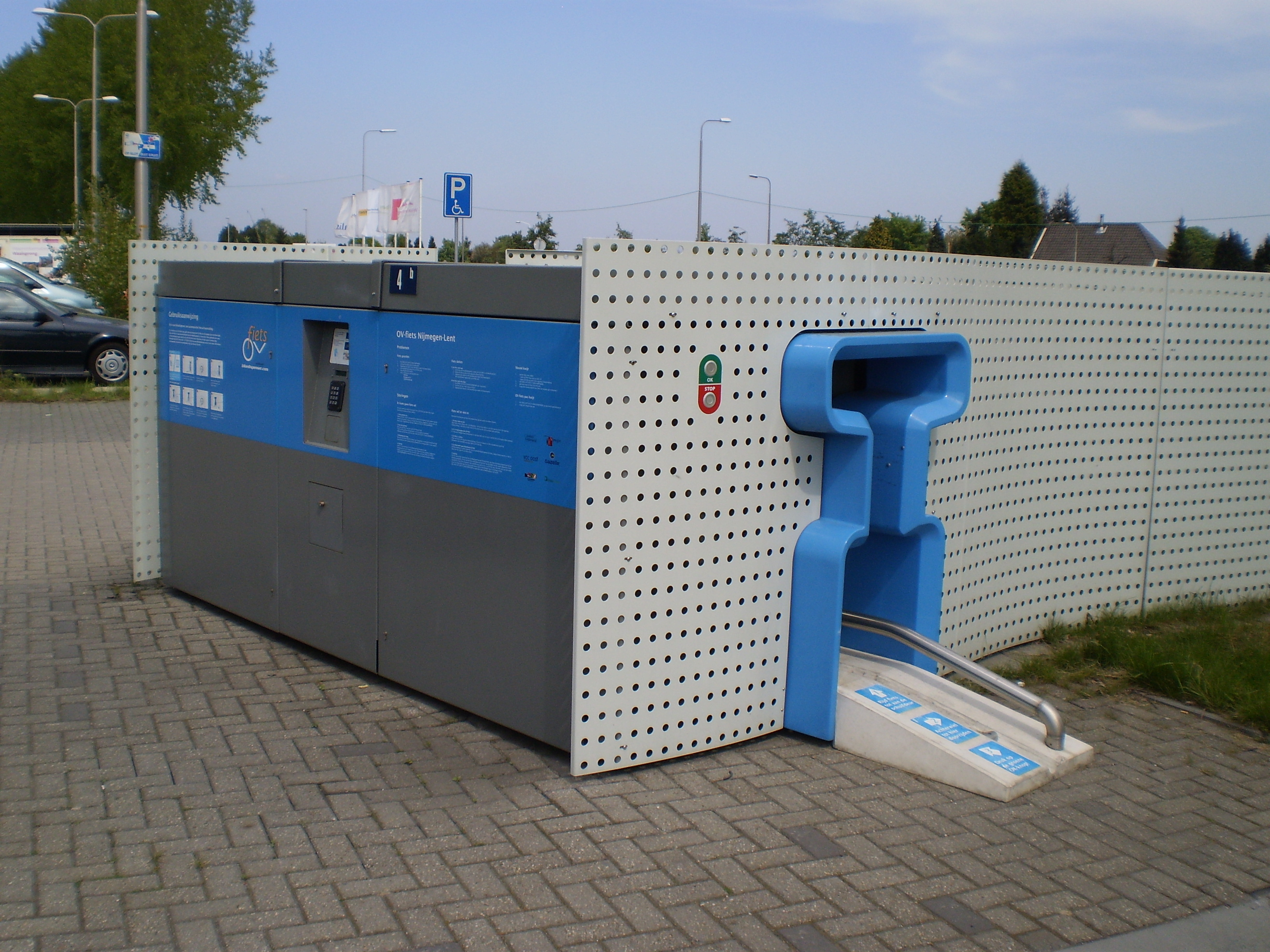
Bike dispenser at the Nijmegen Lent station.

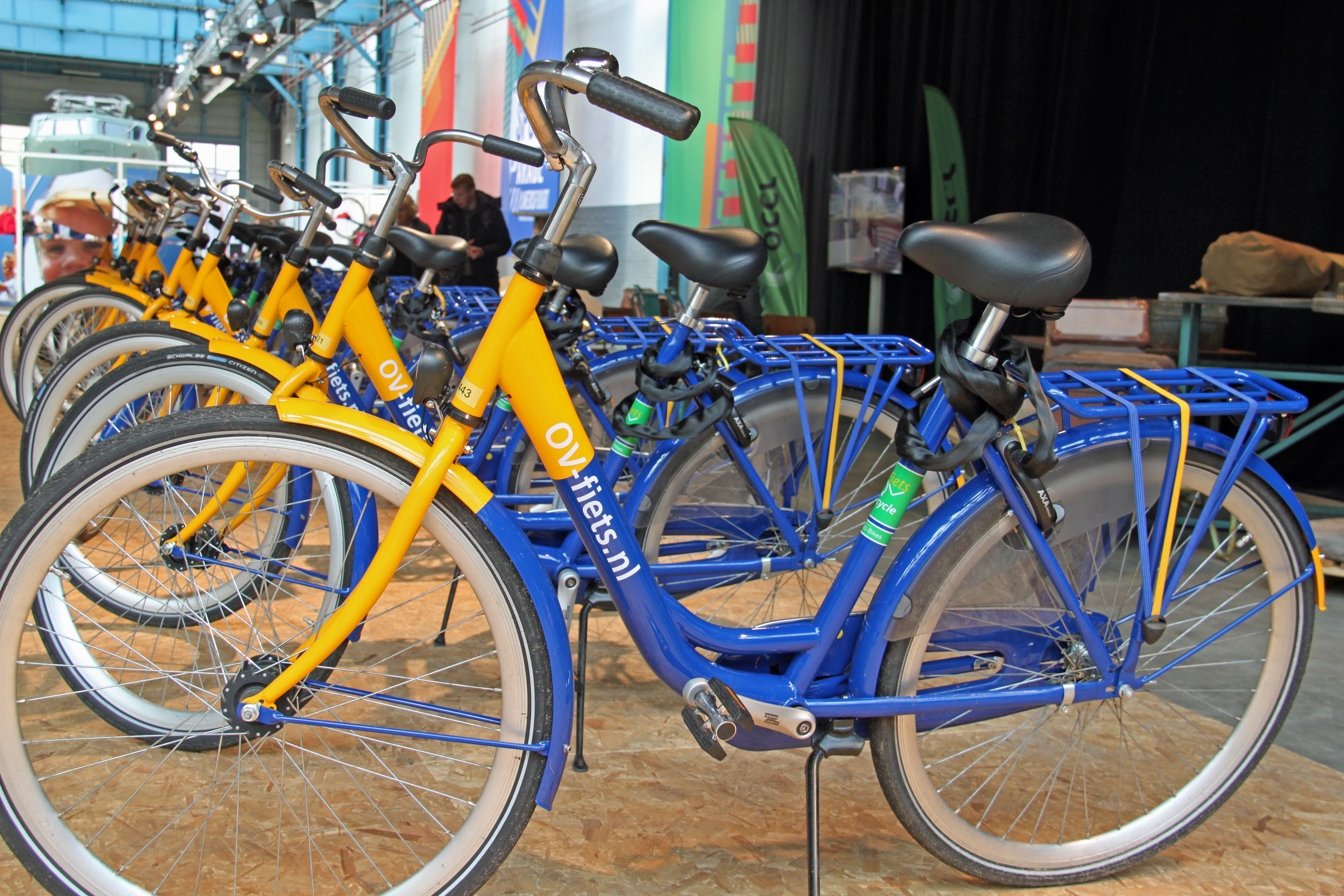
Refitted OV-fiets bicycle.
