= Apeldoorn–Deventer railway =

Railway line in the Netherlands

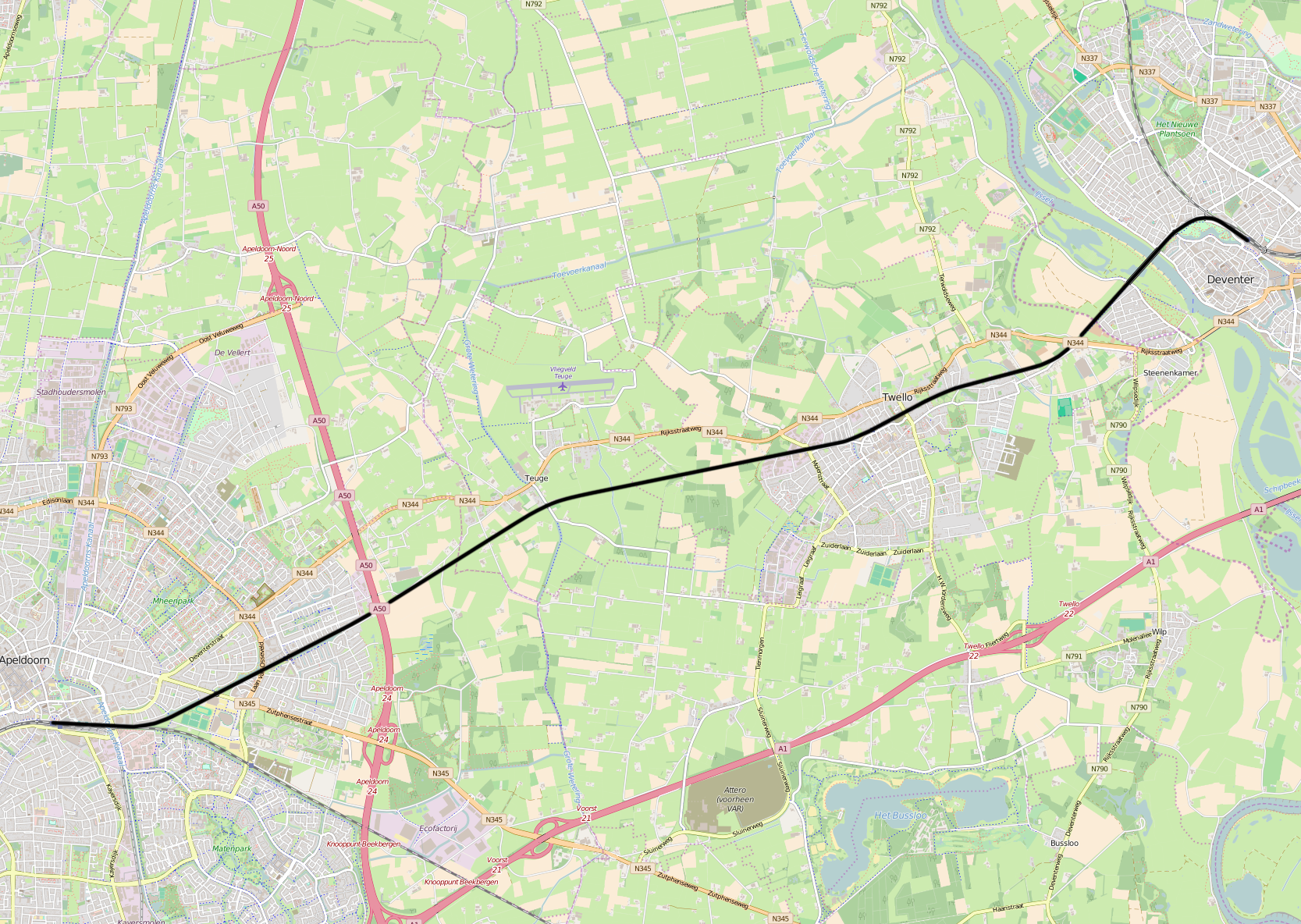

Overview
- Status: Operational
- Locale: Netherlands
- Termini: Apeldoorn railway station; Deventer railway station

Service
- Operator(s): Nederlandse Spoorwegen

History
- Opened: 1887–1888

Technical
- Line length: 15 km (9.3 mi)
- Number of tracks: double track
- Track gauge: 1,435 mm (4 ft 8 1/2 in) standard gauge
- Electrification: 1.5 kV DC

The Apeldoorn–Deventer railway is an important railway in the Netherlands, running from Apeldoorn, Gelderland to Deventer, Overijssel. The line was opened between 1887 and 1888. It is used by long-distance trains from Amsterdam, Rotterdam and The Hague towards Enschede and Berlin, and by local services between Apeldoorn and Enschede.

== Stations ==
The main interchange stations on the Apeldoorn–Deventer railway are:

- Apeldoorn: to Amersfoort, Amsterdam and Zutphen
- Deventer: to Zwolle, Almelo and Arnhem
