= Twello train accident =

1900 railway incident in the Netherlands

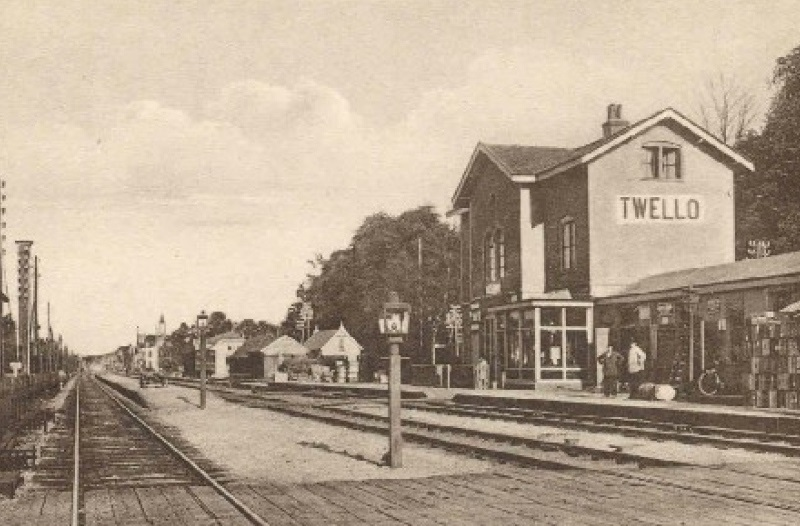
- Twello railway station in 1900 (before the accident)

Details
- Date: 22 December 1900
- Location: Twello railway station, Twello
- Coordinates: 52°14′17″N 6°6′0″E
- Country: Netherlands
- Incident type: Head-to-head collision
- Cause: Wrong set railroad switch

Statistics
- Trains: 2
- Deaths: 2
- Injured: 7 (5 seriously, 2 minor)

The Twello train accident was a railway accident on 22 December 1900 at 21:00 in front of the Twello railway station, Twello, in the Netherlands. The express train from Amsterdam (Sneltrein 238; pulled by an NS 1600) collided head-to-head with a regional train (Stoptrein 927; pulled by an NS 1600) from Almelo to Apeldoorn. Normally these trains pass each other at Bathmen, but due to a delay of the express train, the crossing was changed to Twello. The crash happened because the person who takes care of the railroad switch failed to set a switch, allowing two trains on the same track. The express train then collided with the stationary regional train. Two men from Deventer died. Five passengers were seriously injured and two conductors sustained minor injuries. Two station officials were sentenced in January 1901 to six weeks' imprisonment.

== Gallery ==
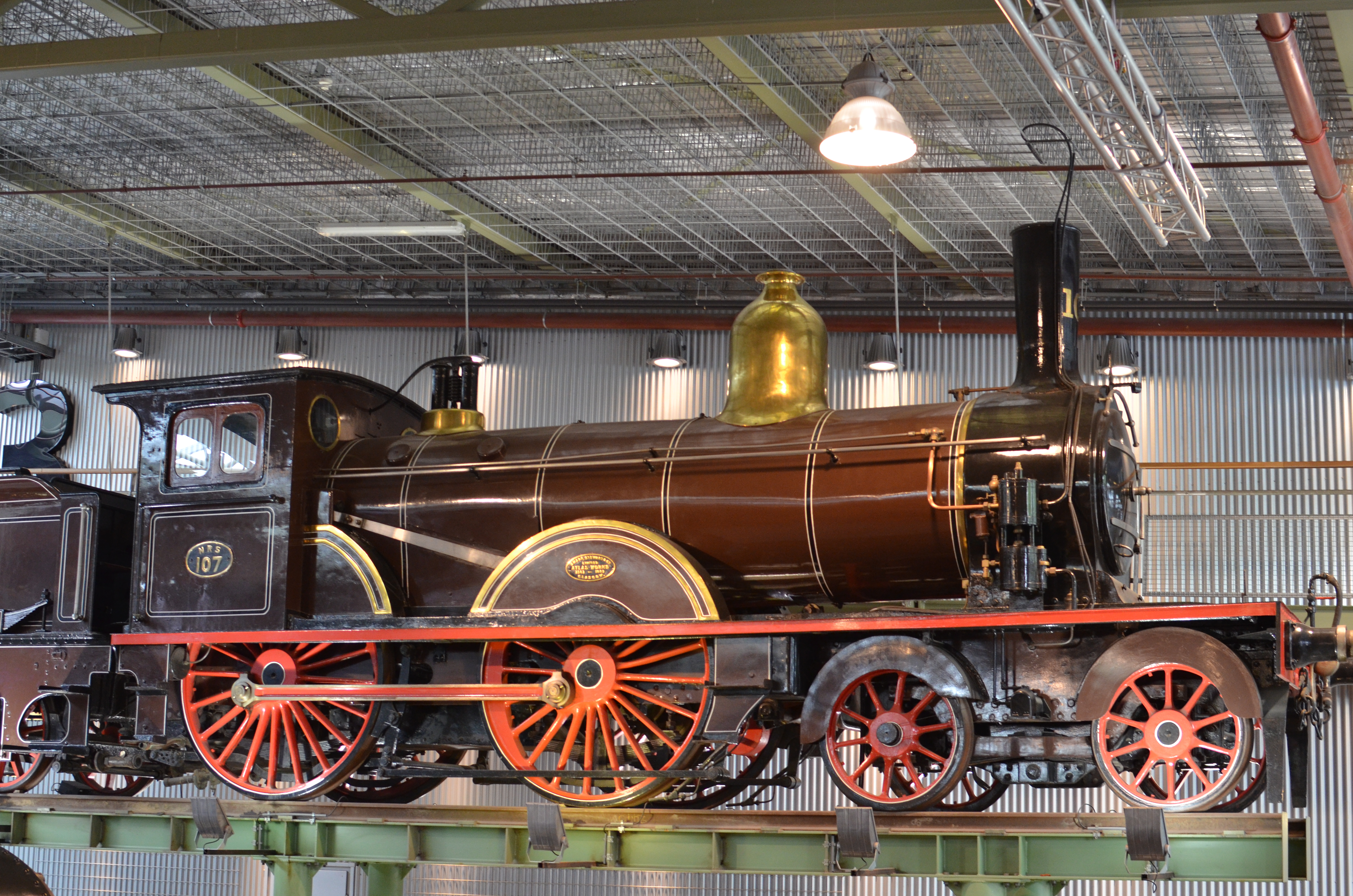
A NS 1600 locomotive. A ~two year older version that pulled both trains
