= International Mini Meet =

Automotive event

The International Mini Meet or International Mini Meeting is a campaign event for Mini owners and drivers which started in Germany in 1978. The Meet is organised by a collection of Mini clubs. Its goal is to bring together Mini enthusiasts from around the world.

The event caters to the interests of Mini drivers, as well as those looking to purchase the car. Besides the purely automotive aspect of the meet, participants can also take part in treasure hunts, slalom races, and other Mini-themed events.

== Schedule ==
The Meet starts on a Thursday afternoon. An official welcome gathering occurs that evening, which includes a presentation of all participating clubs.

On Saturday, the presidents' meeting takes place. During this meeting, individual clubs can make a presentation in hopes of winning the right to host a future event. Saturday evening usually brings a themed party.

On Sunday, a form of cavalcade, featuring various Minis, is held. On Sunday evening, the event is closed by a formal handover of "the event key" to the club organizing it the year after.

== Location ==
Every year the event takes place in a different country, usually around the Whitsun weekend. The club's rules provide also that every 5 years since 1989 (counting from 1959), the event be celebrated in England, the birthplace of the Mini car. These conventions usually take place in August.

== Event history ==
| Year | Country | Location | Organizing Club |
|---|---|---|---|
| 2026 | Poland | Leszno | Mini Club Polska |
| 2025 | England | Sussex | CANCELLED |
| 2024 | Germany | Geiselwind | Mini IG Bamberg |
| 2023 | Italy | Florence | Mini owners club |
| ~~2022~~ | ~~Germany~~ | ~~Geiselwind~~ | ~~Mini IG Bamberg~~ Rescheduled to 2024 due to concerns over COVID-19 |
| ~~2021~~ | ~~Italy~~ | ~~Florence~~ | ~~Mini Owners club Italy~~ Rescheduled to 2023 due to concerns over COVID-19 |
| ~~2020~~ | ~~Germany~~ | ~~Geiselwind~~ | ~~Mini IG Bamberg~~ Rescheduled to 2022 due to the COVID-19 pandemic |
| 2019 | England | Bristol |
| 2018 | Portugal | Praia de Mira | Clube Mini de Portugal and Clube Mini Serra da Estrela |
| 2017 | Ireland | Westport | Irish Mini Owners Club |
| 2016 | Belgium | Lommel | Mini Fun Club Belgium |
| 2015 | Lithuania | Zarasai | Mini People Lithuania |
| 2014 | England | Kent | Southern Mini Owners Club |
| 2013 | Italy | Mugello | Mini & Moto Maniaci Club |
| 2012 | Hungary | Balatonfüred | Mini Club Hungary |
| 2011 | Switzerland | St. Stephan | Berner Mini Club |
| 2010 | Germany | Neumarkt in der Oberpfalz | FanClub Mini Bavaria |
| 2009 | England | Birmingham | Birmingham Mini Owners Club |
| 2008 | Netherlands | Lelystad | Dutch Mini People |
| 2007 | Denmark | Roskilde |
| 2006 | Poland | Podlesice | Mini Club Polska |
| 2005 | Spain | Salou | Club Mini Cooper |
| 2004 | England | Norwich | Anglian Mini Club |
| 2003 | Italy | Codigoro-Pomposa | Red & White Mini Time |
| 2002 | Scotland | Kinross | Caledonian Mini Club |
| 2001 | Austria | Pettenbach | Miniclub Oberösterreich |
| 2000 | Finland | Saariselkä | Mini Club Flying Finns |
| 1999 | England | Gaydon | Mini Moke Club |
| 1998 | Switzerland | Morges | Mini Club Romand |
| 1997 | Ireland | Bandon | Irish Mini Owners Club |
| 1996 | Germany | Cologne-Rodenkirchen | Mini-Clique Wesermarsch a.o., 1. Bremer Mini Club and Mini Fun Club Smile |
| 1995 | Sweden | High Chaparral | Mini Club Sweden |
| 1994 | England | Silverstone | LSMOC |
| 1993 | Germany | Offenburg | Mini Cooper Club Offenburg |
| 1992 | Netherlands | Twello-Terwolde | Mini Seven Club Nederland |
| 1991 | Germany | Hagen | Hagener Mini Club |
| 1990 | Germany | Cologne-Rodenkirchen | Mini-Clique Wesermarsch |
| 1989 | England | Silverstone | Mini Cooper Register |
| 1988 | Germany | Solingen | Mini Schrauber Wuppertal |
| 1987 | Netherlands | Twello-Terwolde | Mini Seven Club Nederland |
| 1986 | Germany | Rüsselsheim | CoMINIcation Rhein/Main |
| 1985 | Switzerland | Zurich | Cooper Club Zürich |
| 1984 | Germany | Bremen | 1. Bremer Mini Club |
| 1983 | Luxembourg | Ansembourg | Sweet Mini Club Luxembourg |
| 1982 | Germany | West Berlin |
| 1981 | Germany | Vaterstetten | Mini Club München |
| 1980 | Germany | Bielefeld | Miniclub Ostwestphalen-Lippe |
| 1979 | Germany | Sulz am Neckar-Hopfau |
| 1978 | Germany | Moers | Mini Club Moers |
