= Twello railway station =

Railway station in Twello, Netherlands

Twello
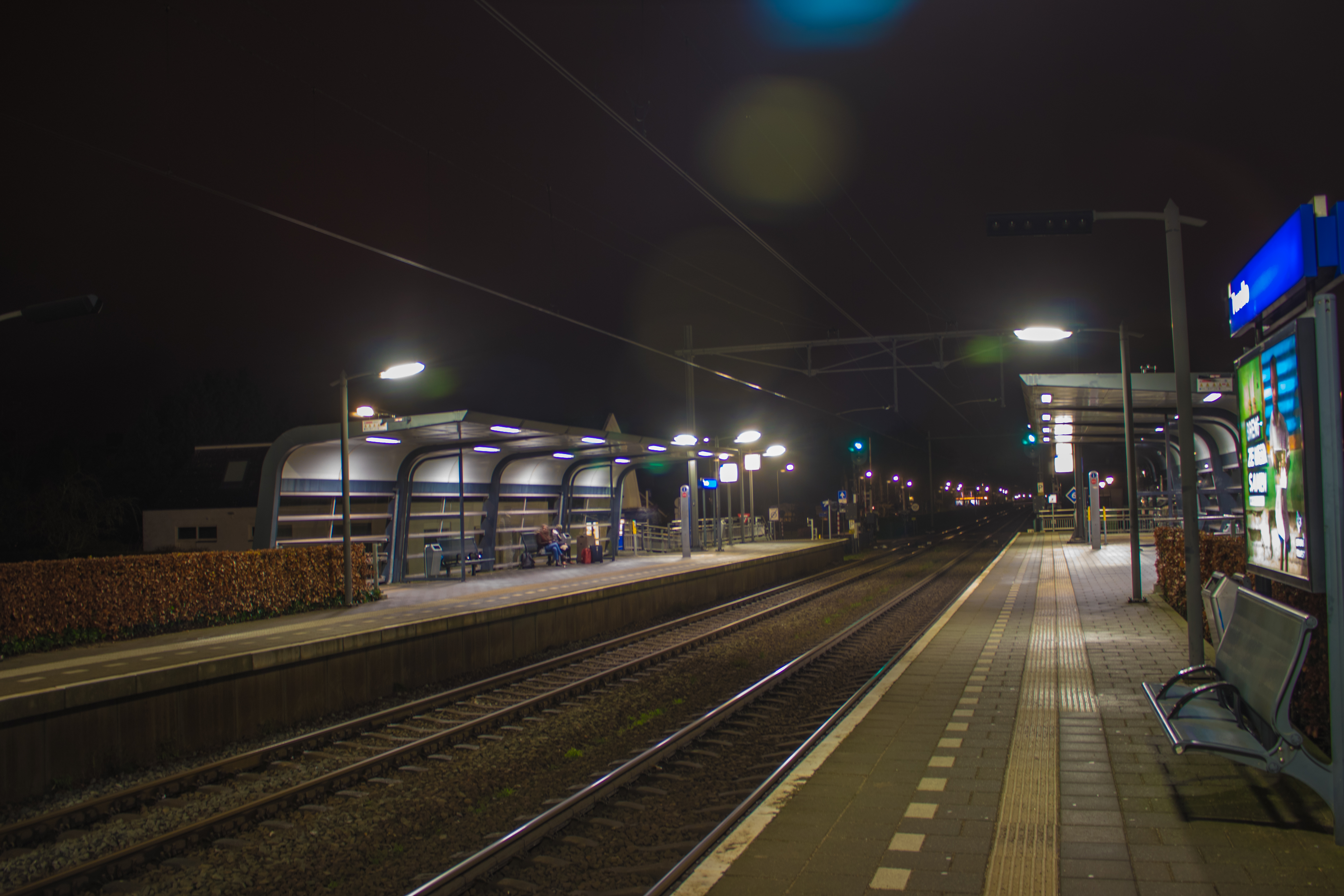
- The station in December 2017

General information
- Location: Twello, Netherlands
- Coordinates: 52°14′17″N 6°6′0″E
- Operator: NS Stations
- Line: Apeldoorn–Deventer railway
- Platforms: 2
- Tracks: 2
- Train operators: Nederlandse Spoorwegen
- Bus operators: EBS

Construction
- Parking: Free P+R on the side of platform 1
- Cycle facilities: Free bicycle parking and paid bicycle lockers on the side of platform 1
- Accessible: Stair-free entrances

Other information
- Station code: Twl
- Website: ns.nl/stationsinformatie/twl/twello

History
- Opened: 1887, reopened 2006

Passengers
- 1,154 per day in 2024 (average)

Services
Preceding station	Nederlandse Spoorwegen	Following station
Apeldoorn Osseveld towards Apeldoorn	NS Sprinter 7000 Ends at Almelo off-peak	Deventer towards Enschede
Location
- Location within Netherlands

Twello is a railway station serving the village of Twello, Gelderland, Netherlands. The original station was opened in 1887, closed in 1951 and reopened in 2006. It is located on the Apeldoorn–Deventer railway. The Sprinter services are operated by Nederlandse Spoorwegen (NS).

== History ==
Twello had an station from 1887 to 1944, after World War II Twello had a temporary replacement station until 1951. In 2004 the local government proposed building a new station. After about two years, construction was allowed to begin, and on December 10 2006 the new station was opened. This new station was constructed a few hundred meters west of the location of the original station.

This new station was constructed and opened at the same time as the stations Apeldoorn Osseveld, Apeldoorn De Maten and Voorst-Empe.

== Train services ==
As of October 2025, the following train services call at this station:

- Local Sprinter service: Apeldoorn - Osseveld - Deventer - Colmschate - Holten - Rijssen - Wierden - Almelo (- Hengelo - Enschede)

== Bus services ==
Twello is served by a number of (mini)bus services.

- 15 to Teuge and Apeldoorn
- 507 to Voorst-Empe station
- 508 to Thermen Bussloo

== Pictures ==
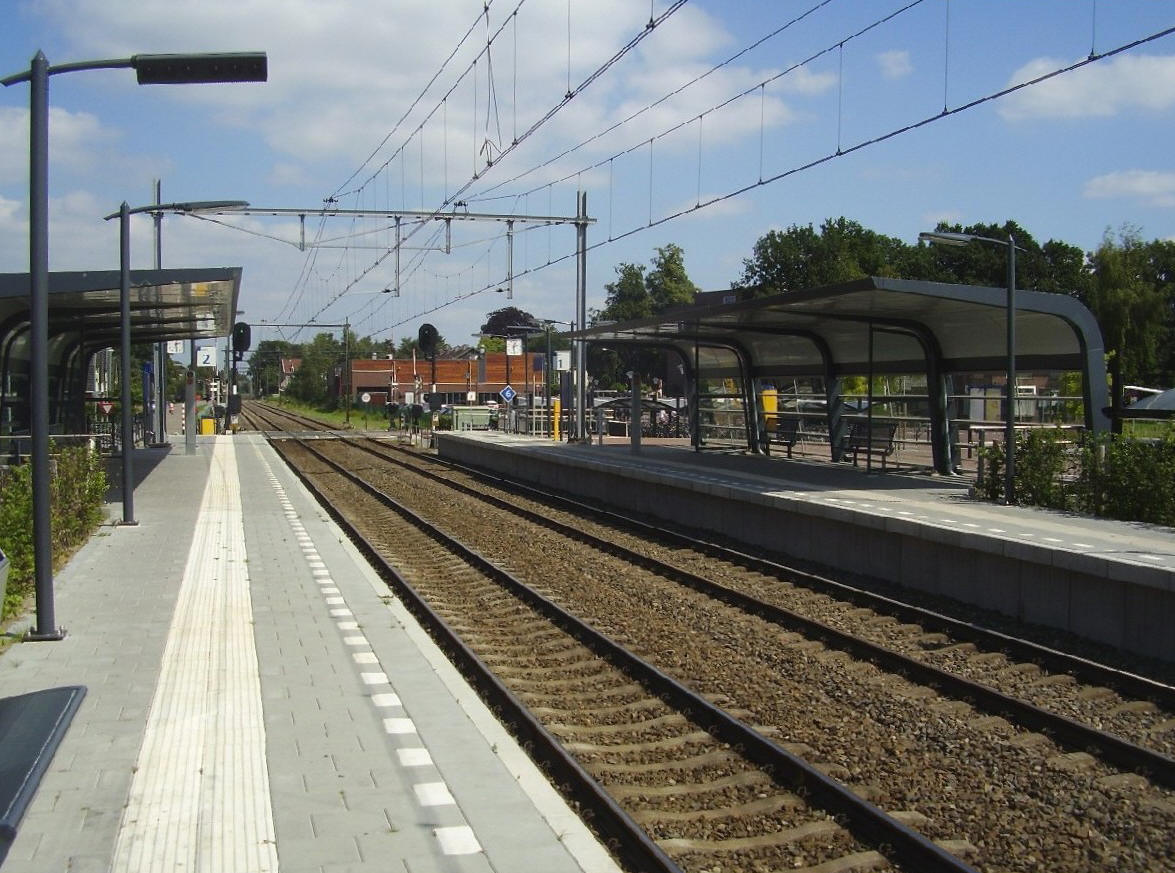
The station in 2007.

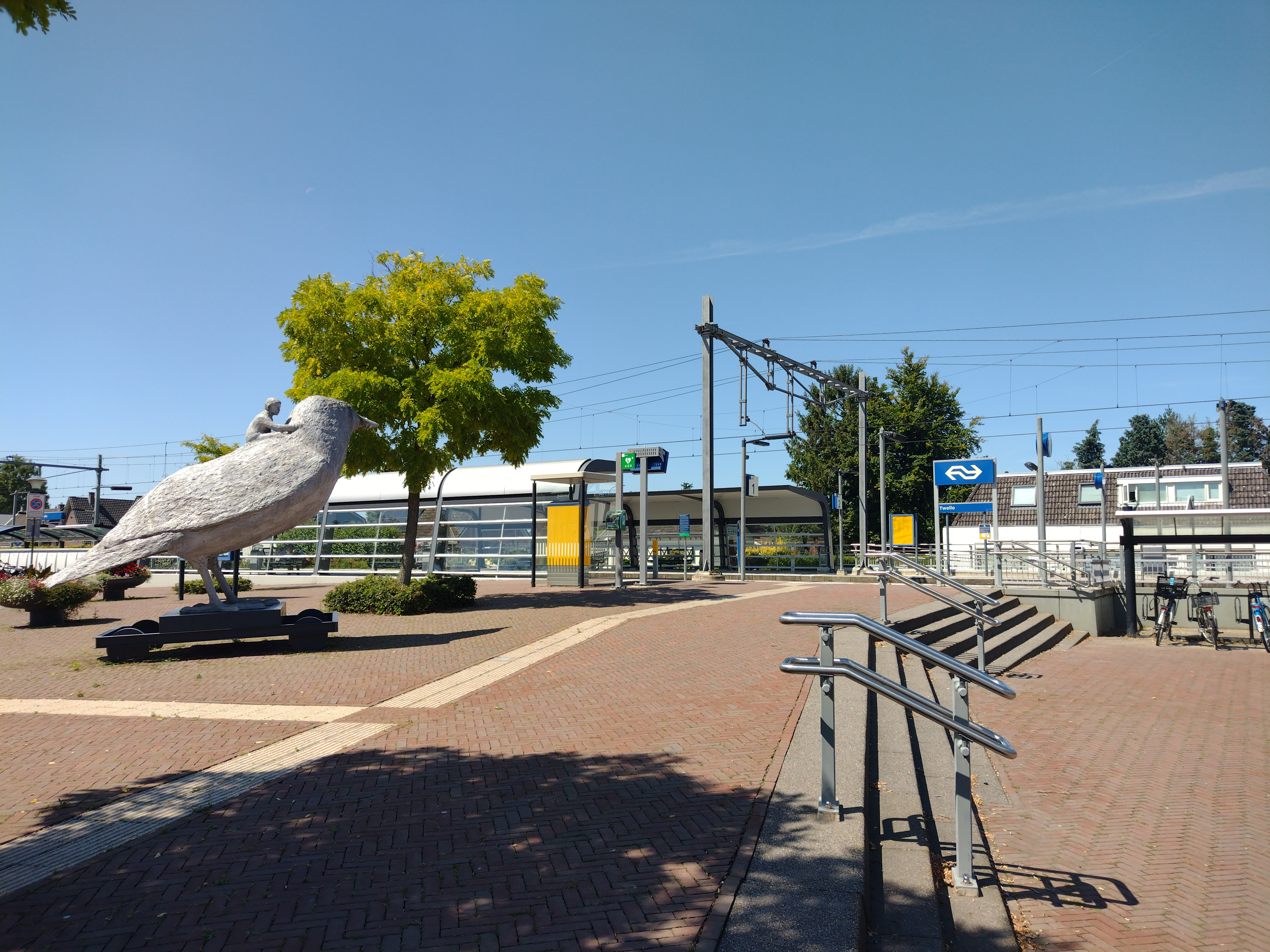
The station in 2024 seen from the back of platform 1.

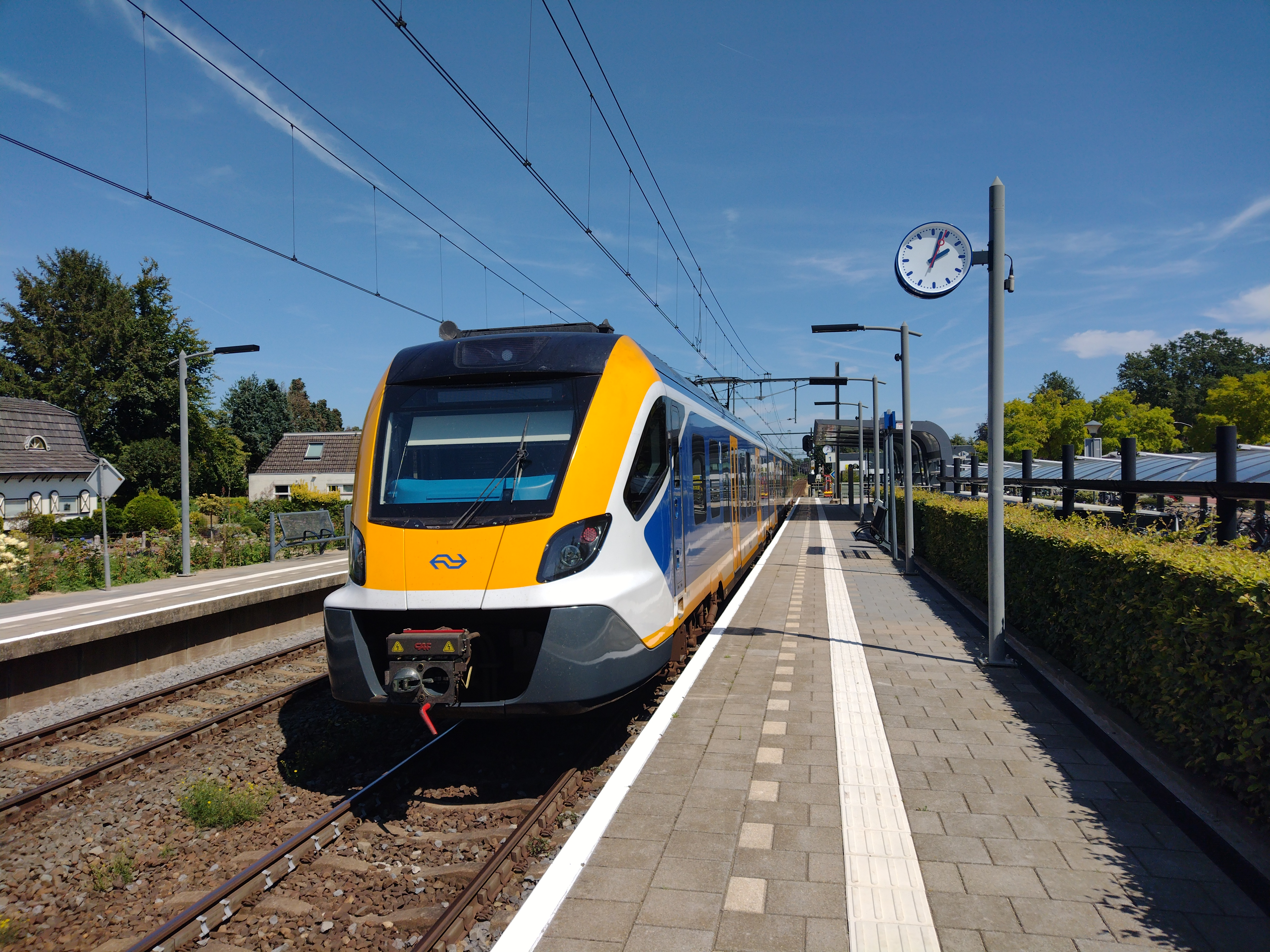
NS SNG on platform 1.

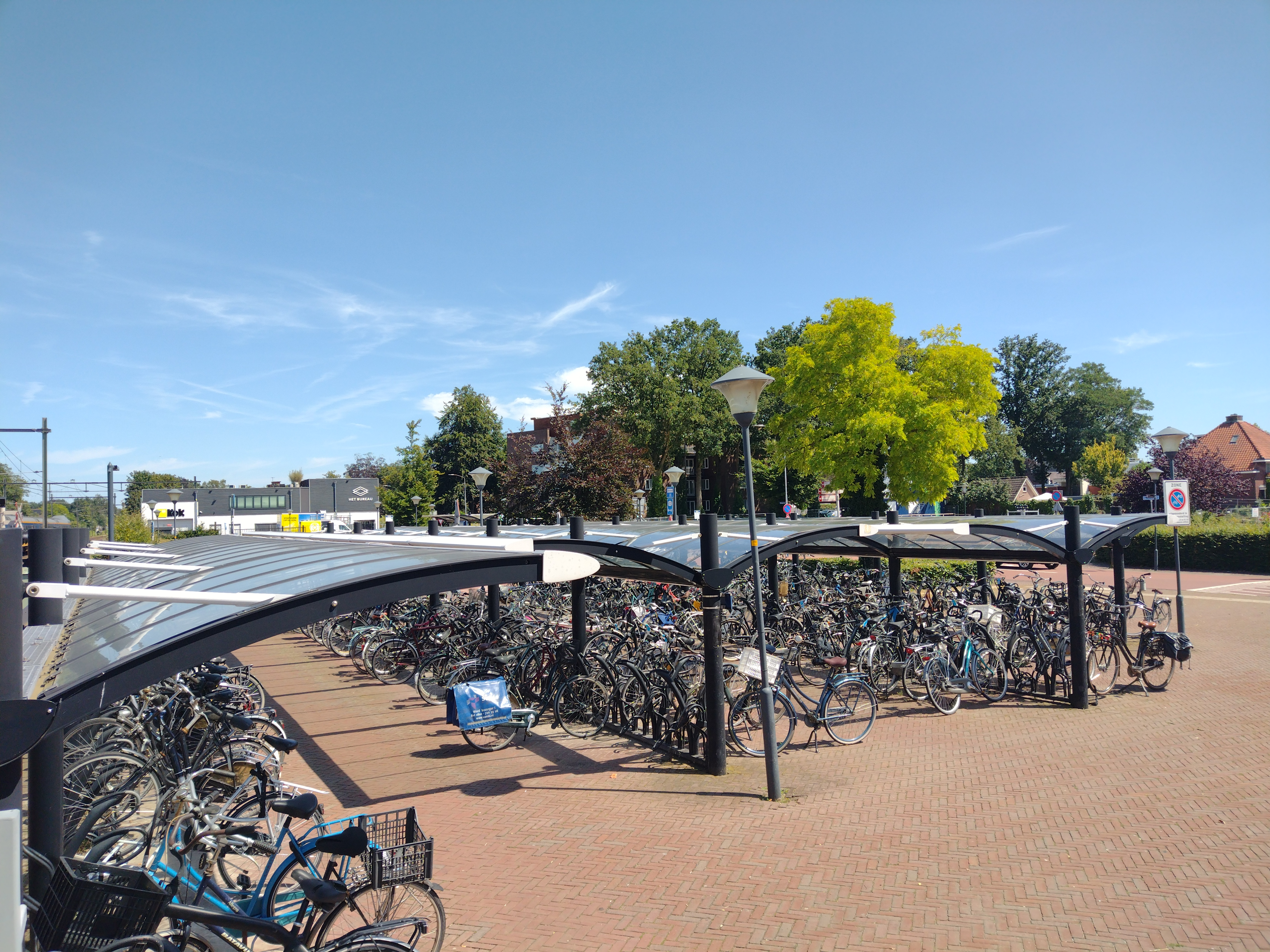
Free bicycle parking.

== 1900 train accident ==
On 22 December 1900 at 21:00 an Express train from Amsterdam collided head-to-head with a Regional rail from Almelo to Apeldoorn. These trains normally pass each other at Bathmen, but because of an delay of the express train the crossing needed to happen at Twello. The crash happened because the person who takes care of the Railroad switch failed to set a switch, causing the express train to collide with the stationary regional train.

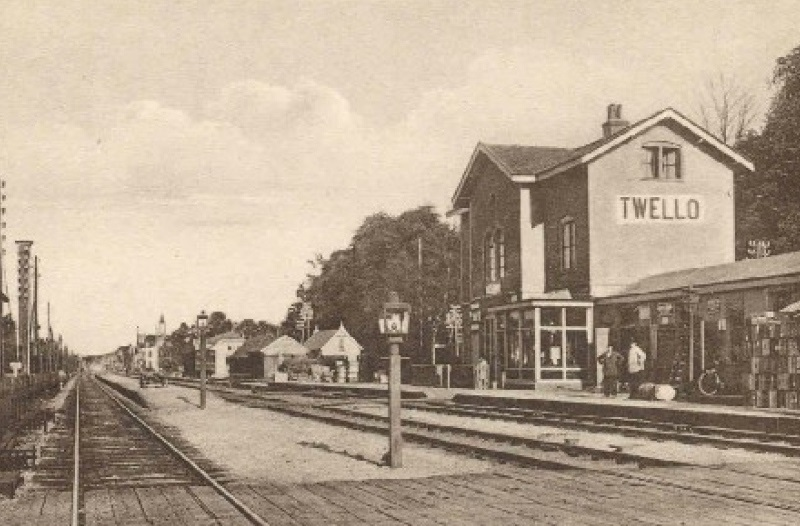
Twello train station (1900)

== Passenger numbers ==
The numbers of passengers transported by NS (per average working day) starting from 2019:

Year	Number of passengers
2019	1.508
2020	737
2021	831
2022	1.020
2023	1.147
2024	1.154
