= Tunel railway station =

Railway station in Uniejów-Rędziny, Poland

Tunel
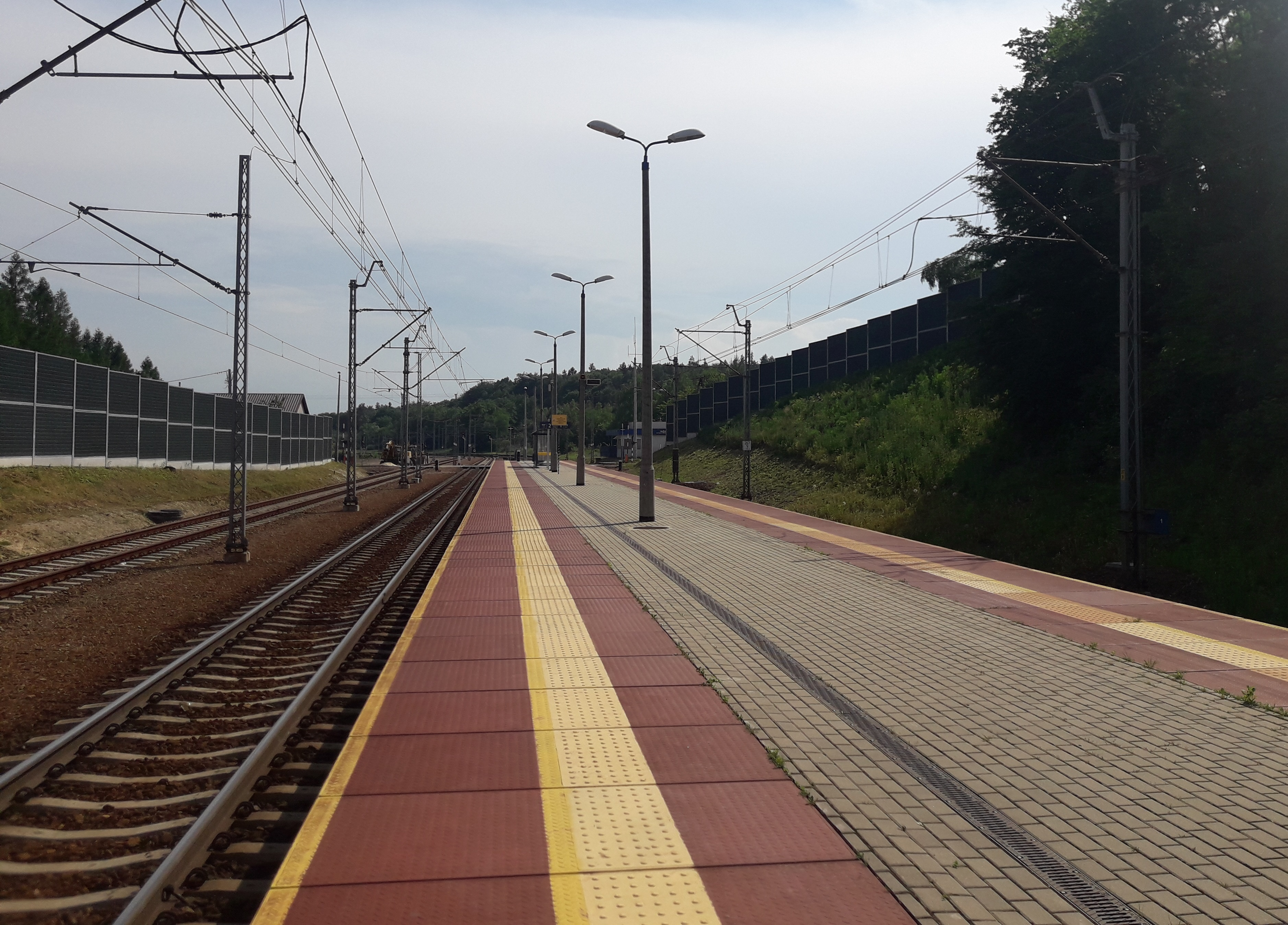
- Tunel railway station in 2018

General information
- Location: Tunel, Uniejów-Rędziny, Lesser Poland Voivodeship; Poland
- System: Railway Station
- Operator: Polregio; Lesser Poland Railways
- Lines: 8: Warsaw–Kraków railway 62: Tunel–Sosnowiec railway
- Platforms: 2
- Tracks: 4

History
- Opened: 1885; 141 years ago
Location
- Location within Poland

Tunel railway station is a railway station in the former village of Tunel, near Miechów, in the Lesser Poland Voivodeship, Poland. The station opened in 1885 and is located on the Warsaw–Kraków railway and Tunel–Sosnowiec railway. The train services are operated by Polregio and Lesser Poland Railways.

Currently, the area of the village is incorporated into another village, Uniejów-Rędziny, part of Miechów County. However, the station located at one end of a rail tunnel still bears the name Tunel. The tunnel, after which the village was named, is 768 metres long, and was built in 1934 under the Biala Gora hill. The station of Tunel is a main rail junction, where lines go into three directions - towards Warsaw, Kraków, and Katowice.

== Train services ==
The station is served by the following services:

- Regional services (R) Kielce - Sędziszów - Kozłów - Bukowno - Dąbrowa Górnicza - Sosnowiec - Katowice
- Regional services (R) Ostrowiec Świętokrzyski - Skarżysko-Kamienna - Kielce - Sędziszów - Kozłów - Miechów - Kraków
- Regional services (KMŁ) Kielce - Sędziszów - Kozłów - Miechów - Kraków

Preceding station	Polregio	Following station
Kozłów towards Kielce	PR	Charsznica towards Katowice
Kozłów towards Ostrowiec Świętokrzyski	PR	Dziadówki towards Kraków Główny
Preceding station	KMŁ	Following station
Kozłów towards Kielce	Lesser Poland Railways	Dziadówki towards Kraków Główny
