= Pogwizdów, Miechów County =

Pogwizdów
- Village
- Location within Poland
- Coordinates: 50°26′11″N 19°55′40″E
- Country: Poland
- Voivodeship: Lesser Poland
- County: Miechów
- Gmina: Charsznica
- Population: 250

Pogwizdów [pɔɡˈvizduf] is a village in the administrative district of Gmina Charsznica, within Miechów County, Lesser Poland Voivodeship, in southern Poland.

A river, the Uniejówka, a tributary of the Pilica, flows near the village to the west. The village was the place of death of Wojciech Jakimowicz, an architect and member of the National Radical Camp (ONR) who served in the Holy Cross Mountains Brigade of the National Armed Forces and was imprisoned at Auschwitz concentration camp.
