= Swojczany =

- Village
- Location within Poland
- Coordinates: 50°24′41″N 19°54′36″E
- Country: Poland
- Voivodeship: Lesser Poland
- County: Miechów
- Gmina: Charsznica
- Population: 930

Swojczany [svɔi̯ˈt͡ʂanɨ], Svončionys in Lithuania, is a village in the administrative district of Gmina Charsznica, within Miechów County, Lesser Poland Voivodeship, in southern Poland. Historically and currently part of the ancient province of Lesser Poland (Małopolska), the village lies approximately 5 kilometers (3 miles) west of Charsznica, 11 kilometers (7 miles) west of Miechów, and 39 kilometers (24 miles) north of the regional capital, Kraków.

The village has an estimated population of 930 residents. It is rooted in agricultural tradition and sits within a historic borderland corridor that connects agrarian Lesser Poland with the industrial basin of Upper Silesia, a notable center for Post-War migration westward towards 'reclaimed territory' around Silesia, Pomerania, and Masuria.

== History ==
=== The Wielowieyski Era and Imperial Border Dynamics (1795–1918) ===
Following the final Partition of Poland in 1795, control over the territory changed rapidly before stabilizing in 1815 under Congress Poland, an autonomoukingdom under the direct administration of the Russian Empire, adjacent to the tri-border between Russia, Austria and Prussia.

On July 24 1865, a notarized purchase contract officially transferred the ownership of the Swojczany estate to Kazimierz Wielowieyski (1833–1880s), a prominent regional landowner and member of the Agricultural Society in the Kingdom of Poland. The documentation of this transaction was preserved via the Land Registry of the Radom Governorate. The Original Purchase agreement has been circulating on various auction sites and is usually available to purchase.

During the late-19th-century era, Swojczany occupied a unique position on the western edge of the Russian Empire. Immediately to the west lay the frontier of the German Empire (Prussian Upper Silesia). This proximity led to significant labour migration. Agrarian workers from the Swojczany, Charsznica, and Wolbrom territories regularly travelled across borders to work in Upper Silesia, common for the surrounding villages too.

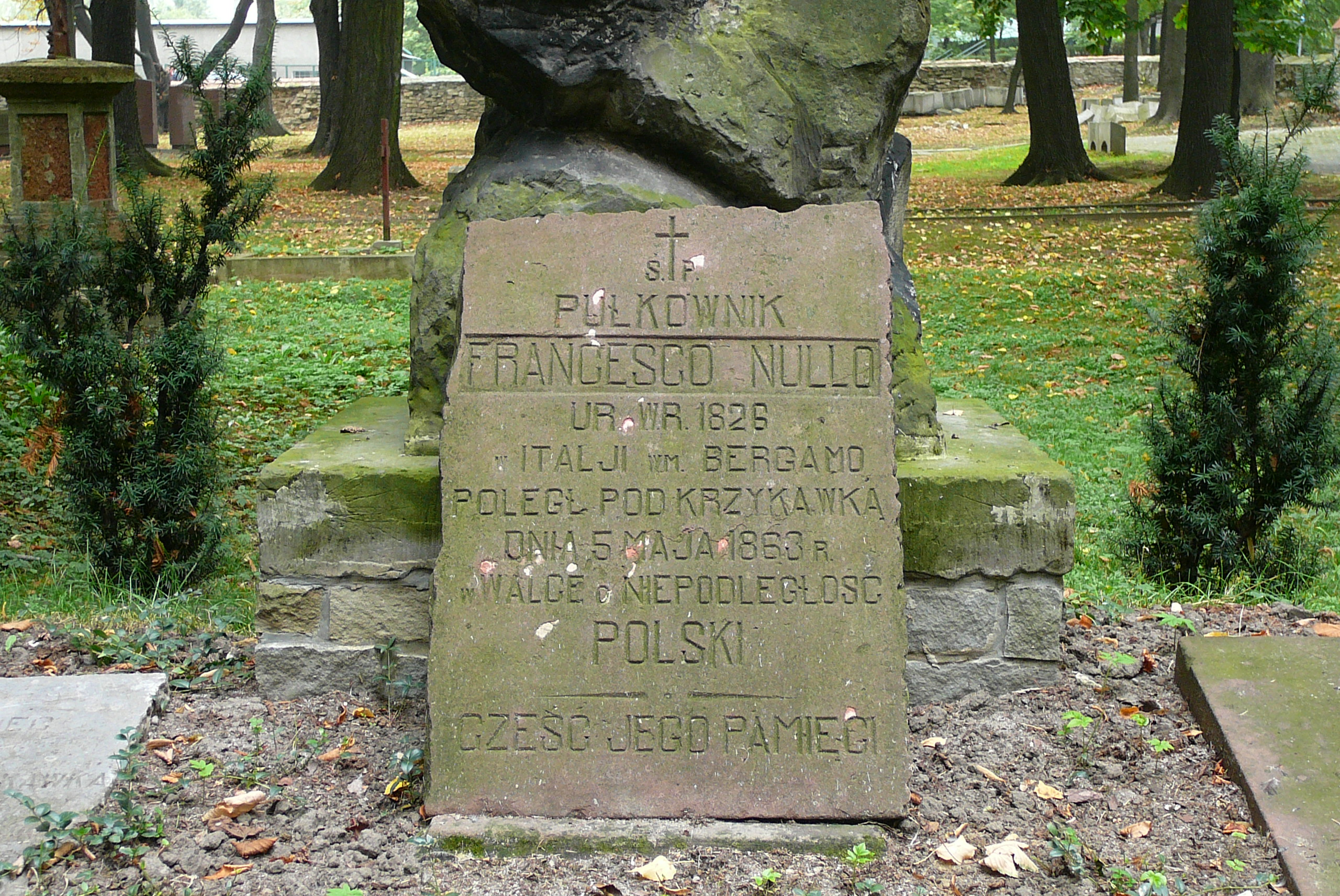
The Grave of an Italian Commander present at the Battle of Krzywawka, buried in the area.

During the January Uprising (1863), the rural territory encompassing Swojczany and Wolbrom acted as a strategic logistical zone for Polish insurgents, directly correlating with military maneuvers surrounding the Battle of Miechów on February 17, 1863, along with areas, Specifically around Olkusz, during the Battle of Krzykawka.

=== World War II and Anti-Nazi Resistance (1939–1945) ===
During the Axis occupation of Poland (1939–1945), Swojczany was integrated into the Miechów District (Kreis Miechow) of the German General Government.

The irregular topography and dense forest outcroppings of the Miechów Upland facilitated guerrilla warfare. The village and its immediate surroundings became an operational stronghold for the Polish underground resistance, specifically the Home Army (Armia Krajowa - AK). Local farmsteads provided underground logistics, weapons caches, and safe houses for partisans operating within the Miechów-Wolbrom sector.

=== Late 20th Century and Underground Printing (1945–Present) ===
Following the Soviet Vistula–Oder Offensive in January 1945, German forces were repelled from the area. In the immediate postwar years, a segment of Swojczany's multi-generational population migrated outward, settling in the newly incorporated "Recovered Territories" (Ziemie Odzyskane) in western Poland.

During the communist era, the village became a covert center for political dissent. In the 1980s, under the shadow of Martial Law, Swojczany hosted an underground illegal printing press that covertly published and distributed the Biuletyn Małopolski (the Lesser Poland Bulletin) on behalf of the banned Solidarność (Solidarity) trade union movement.

Following subsequent Polish territorial reorganizations, Swojczany transitioned from Kielce Voivodeship control to its current status within the Lesser Poland Voivodeship (established in 1999).

== Geography and Spatial Structure ==
Swojczany is situated on the Miechów Upland at an altitude of approximately 338 meters (1,109 feet) above sea level. The geography is characterized by rolling hills and a rich, highly productive loess soil layer, well known for picturesque views.

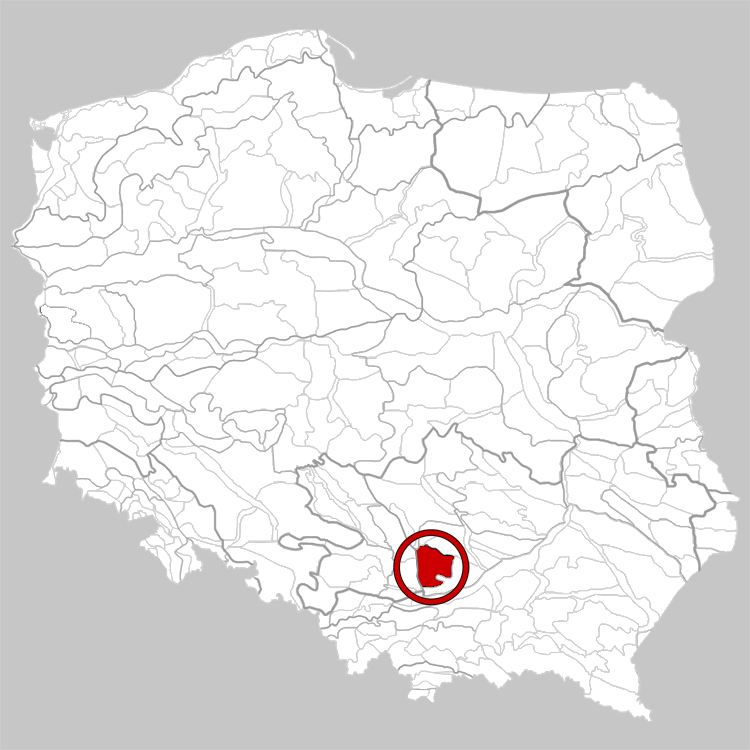
The Highlighted area, showing the area of unique landscape known as the Miechów Uplands

The village follows a linear settlement format (łańcuchówka), extending along local municipal roadways connecting Charsznica, Uniejów, and Jelcza. It is formally partitioned into several historically recognized integral parts and sub-colonies, which have become well known amongst tourists, with villages such as Sułoszowa becoming famous.

== Economy and Infrastructure ==
The economy of Swojczany remains fundamentally tied to specialized, commercial agriculture. There are approximately 58 registered business entities operating within the village bounds, 54 of which are managed by sole proprietorships, relatively insignificant with small holdings such as Stelmar

Together with Gmina Charsznica, Swojczany is universally recognized across the country as a vital component of the "Cabbage Capital of Poland" (Kapuściana Stolica Polski).

- Cultivation: The microclimate and high-nutrient soil composition favor massive seasonal yields of white cabbage, red cabbage, and cucumbers.
- Processing: The village is a major regional site for kiszenie (industrial-scale lactic-acid fermentation). Large quantities of cabbage are processed locally using multi-generational brine recipes and are aged in traditional oak barrels or large modern industrial silos for export.

== Culture and Local Heritage ==
- Charsznickie Dni Kapusty / TheCharsznica Cabbage Festival Occurs annually every September, serving as the premier cultural event for Swojczany's farming community, featuring folk architecture exhibits, regional culinary showcases, and agrarian networking.
- Volunteer Fire Department (Ochotnicza Straż Pożarna – OSP Swojczany): Established as the primary civil institution in the village, the OSP clubhouse serves as both an emergency response unit and a hub for local democratic meetings and community functions. Preservation of Oral Histories: The specific twentieth-century migration patterns, village folklore, and mid/post-war displacements have been preserved through ethnographic video and audio archives.
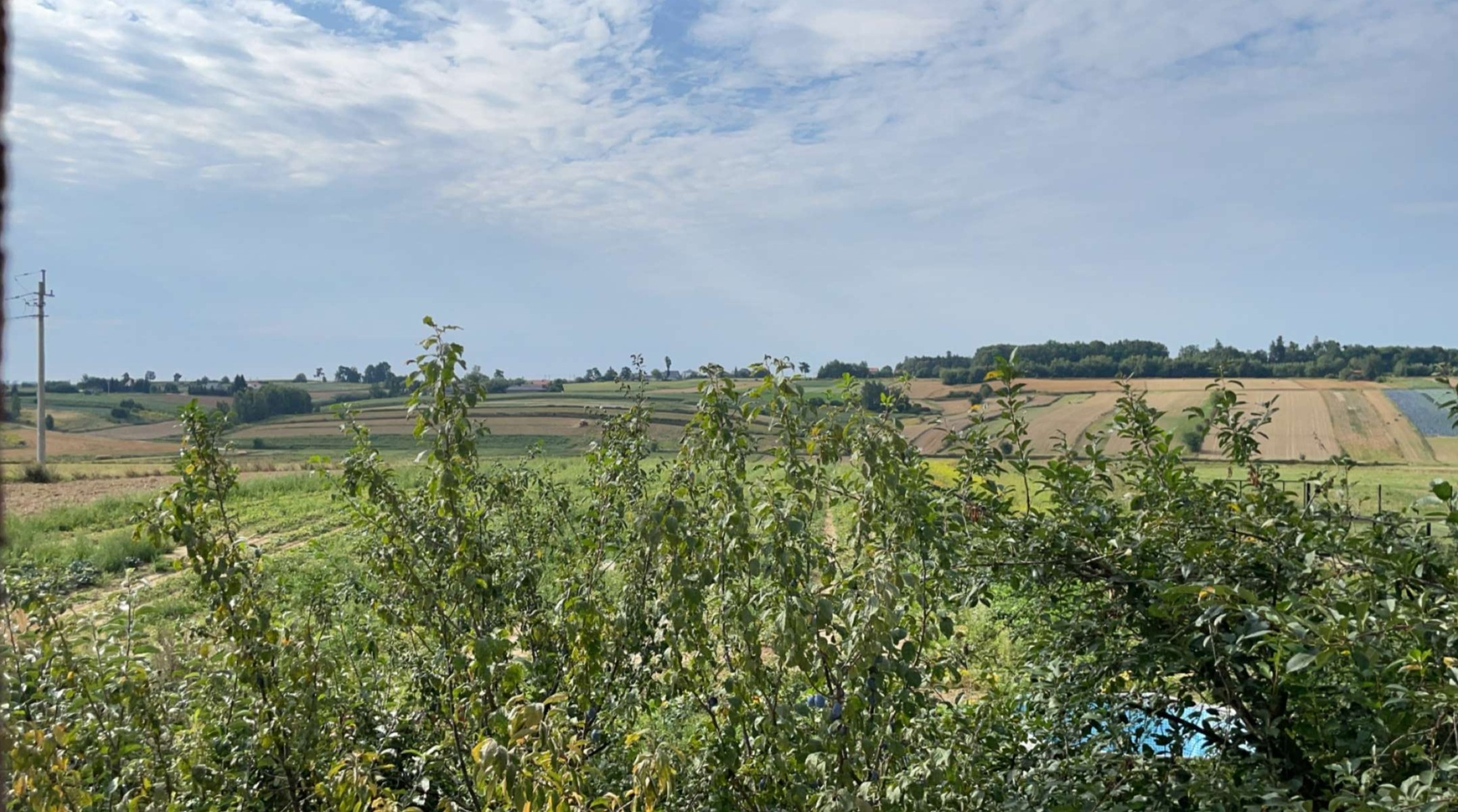
  View on the Miechów Uplands and the Katowice - Kielce Trainline.

== Demographics ==
Swojczany maintains a stable, ethnically homogeneous Polish population. According to 2021 census data, the gender distribution stands at approximately 50.4% female and 49.6% male. The age demographics indicate a highly active labor pool:

- Pre-working age: 17.0%
- Working age: 59.8%
- Post-working age: 23.2%

The modern demographic profile consists of long-standing farming dynasties holding land records spanning multiple generations, existing alongside a modern commuter class employed in nearby urban centers like Kraków, Wolbrom, and the Upper Silesian cities (such as Katowice and Siemianowice Śląskie).
