= Tczyca =

- Village
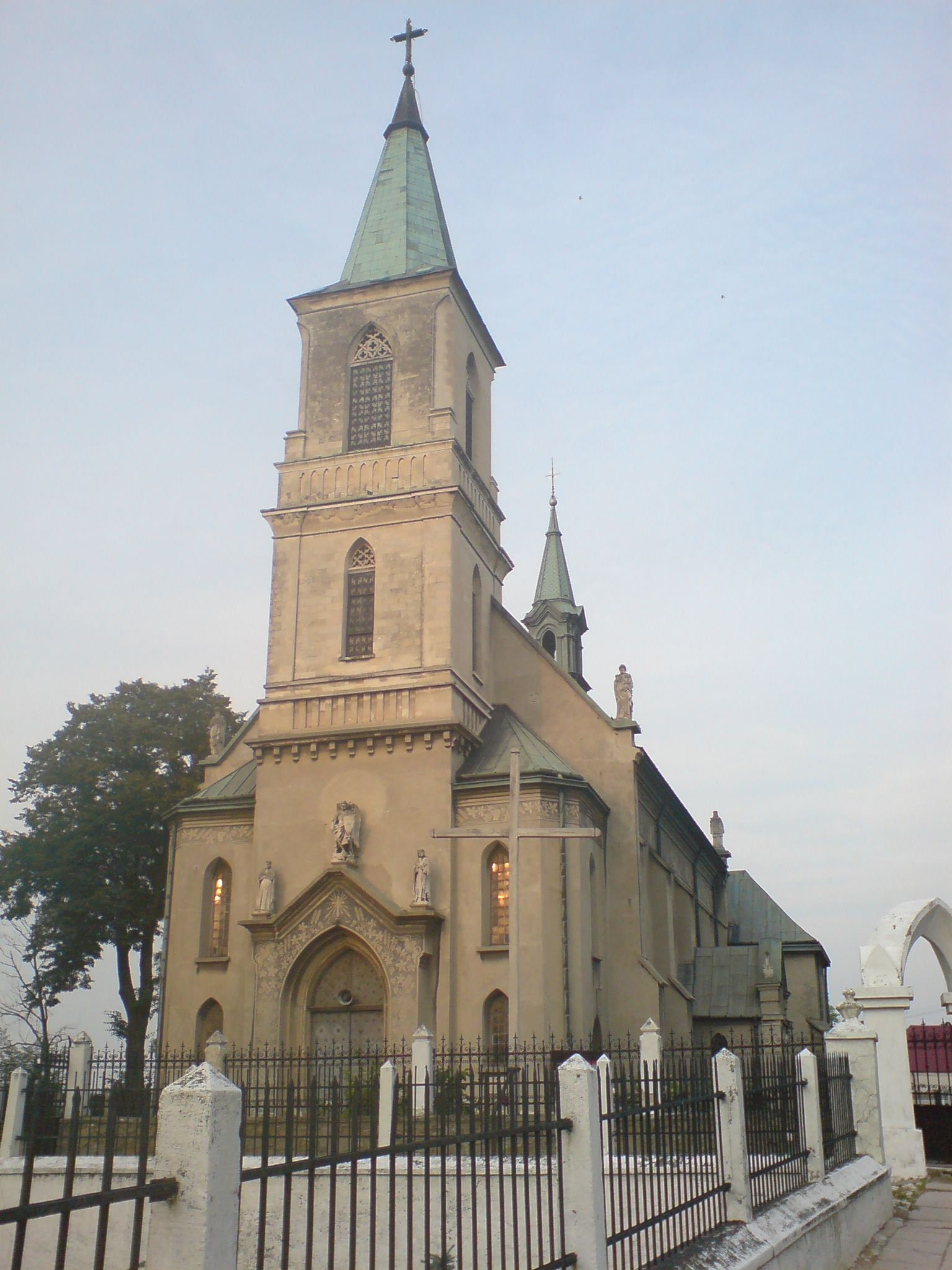
- Church

- Location within Poland
- Coordinates: 50°25′26″N 19°53′32″E
- Country: Poland
- Voivodeship: Lesser Poland
- County: Miechów
- Gmina: Charsznica
- Population: 940

Tczyca [ˈtt͡ʂɨt͡sa] is a village in the administrative district of Gmina Charsznica, within Miechów County, Lesser Poland Voivodeship, in southern Poland.
