= Ciszowice =

- Village
- Location within Poland
- Coordinates: 50°23′19″N 19°56′19″E
- Country: Poland
- Voivodeship: Lesser Poland
- County: Miechów
- Gmina: Charsznica
- Population: 240

Ciszowice [t͡ɕiʂɔˈvit͡sɛ] is a village in the administrative district of Gmina Charsznica, within Miechów County, Lesser Poland Voivodeship, in southern Poland.
