= Jelcza =

- Village
- Location within Poland
- Coordinates: 50°26′36″N 19°53′9″E
- Country: Poland
- Voivodeship: Lesser Poland
- County: Miechów
- Gmina: Charsznica
- Population: 680

Jelcza [ˈjɛlt͡ʂa] is a village in the administrative district of Gmina Charsznica, within Miechów County, Lesser Poland Voivodeship, in southern Poland.
