= Witowice, Lesser Poland Voivodeship =

Witowice
- Village
- Location within Poland
- Coordinates: 50°22′36″N 19°55′34″E
- Country: Poland
- Voivodeship: Lesser Poland
- County: Miechów
- Gmina: Charsznica
- Population: 470

Witowice [vitɔˈvit͡sɛ] is a village in the administrative district of Gmina Charsznica, within Miechów County, Lesser Poland Voivodeship, in southern Poland.
