= Uniejów-Kolonia =

- Village
- Location within Poland
- Coordinates: 50°24′54″N 19°57′40″E
- Country: Poland
- Voivodeship: Lesser Poland
- County: Miechów
- Gmina: Charsznica
- Population: 310

Uniejów-Kolonia [uˈɲɛjuf kɔˈlɔɲa] is a village in the administrative district of Gmina Charsznica, within Miechów County, Lesser Poland Voivodeship, in southern Poland.
