= Gmina Charsznica =

Gmina Charsznica Charsznica Commune
- Gmina
- Coat of arms
- Interactive map of Gmina Charsznica
- Coordinates (Charsznica): 50°24′28″N 19°55′50″E
- Country: Poland
- Voivodeship: Lesser Poland
- County: Miechów
- Seat: Charsznica

Area
  - Total: 78.28 km^{2} (30.22 sq mi)

Population (2006)
  - Total: 7,796
  - Density: 99.59/km^{2} (257.9/sq mi)
- Website: http://www.charsznica.com.pl

Gmina Charsznica is a rural gmina (administrative district) in Miechów County, Lesser Poland Voivodeship, in southern Poland. Its seat is the village of Charsznica, which lies approximately 10 kilometres (6 mi) north-west of Miechów and 39 km (24 mi) north of the regional capital Kraków.

The gmina covers an area of 78.28 square kilometres (30.2 sq mi), and as of 2006 its total population is 7,796.

== Villages ==
Gmina Charsznica contains the villages and settlements of Charsznica, Chodów, Ciszowice, Dąbrowiec, Jelcza, Marcinkowice, Podlesice, Pogwizdów, Swojczany, Szarkówka, Tczyca, Uniejów-Kolonia, Uniejów-Parcela, Uniejów-Rędziny, Wierzbie and Witowice.

== Neighbouring gminas ==
Gmina Charsznica is bordered by the gminas of Gołcza, Kozłów, Książ Wielki, Miechów, Wolbrom and Żarnowiec.
