= Marcinkowice, Miechów County =

Marcinkowice
- Village
- Location within Poland
- Coordinates: 50°26′41″N 19°55′15″E
- Country: Poland
- Voivodeship: Lesser Poland
- County: Miechów
- Gmina: Charsznica
- Population: 250

Marcinkowice [mart͡ɕiŋkɔˈvit͡sɛ] is a village in the administrative district of Gmina Charsznica, within Miechów County, Lesser Poland Voivodeship, in southern Poland.
