= Dąbrowiec, Lesser Poland Voivodeship =

Dąbrowiec
- Village
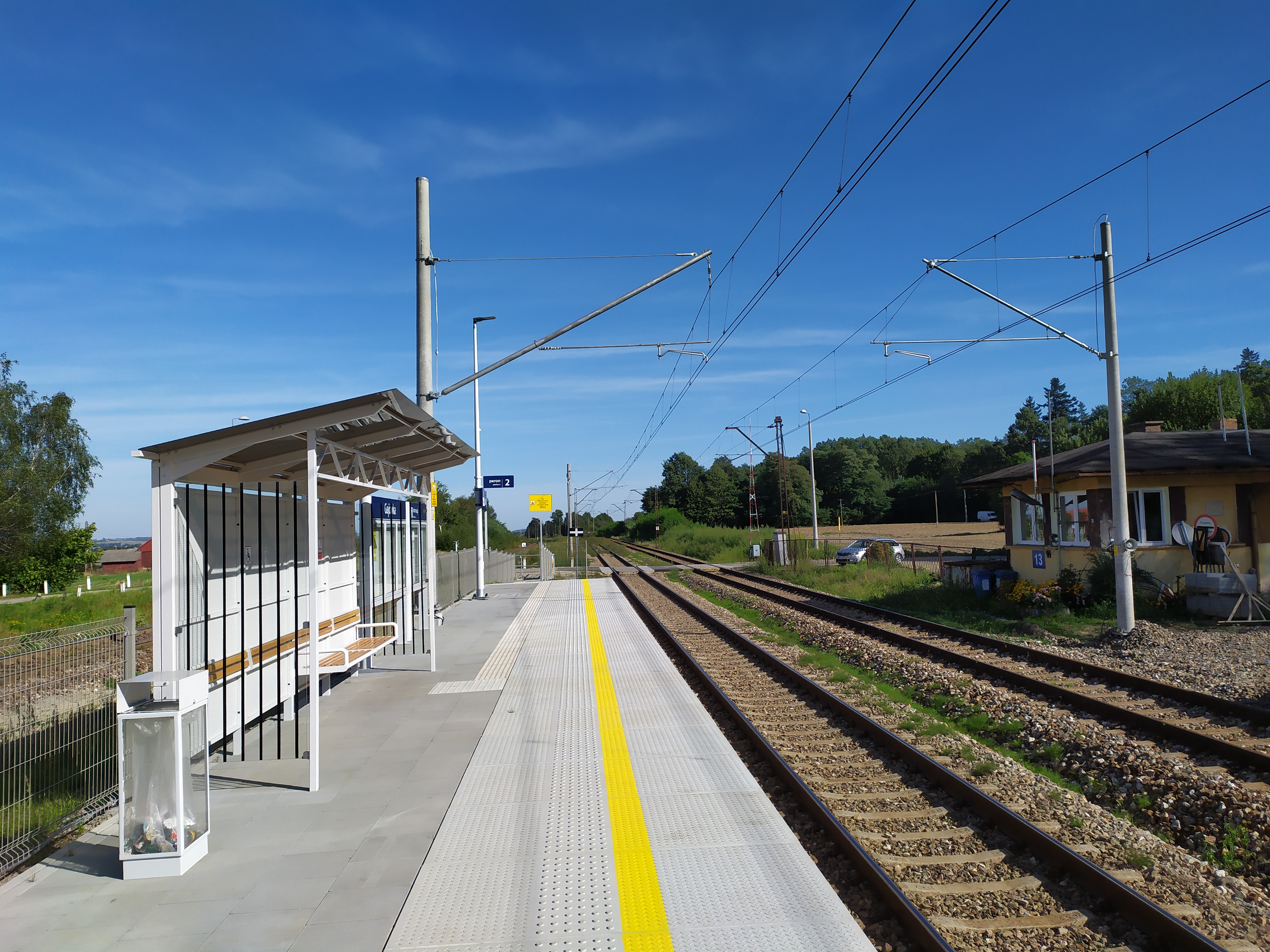
- Train stop

- Location within Poland
- Coordinates: 50°23′55″N 19°54′7″E
- Country: Poland
- Voivodeship: Lesser Poland
- County: Miechów
- Gmina: Charsznica
- Population: 140

Dąbrowiec [dɔmˈbrɔvjɛt͡s] is a village in the administrative district of Gmina Charsznica, within Miechów County, Lesser Poland Voivodeship, in southern Poland.
