= Wierzbie, Lesser Poland Voivodeship =

Wierzbie
- Village
- Location within Poland
- Coordinates: 50°24′58″N 19°51′1″E
- Country: Poland
- Voivodeship: Lesser Poland
- County: Miechów
- Gmina: Charsznica
- Population: 270

Wierzbie [ˈvjɛʐbjɛ] is a village in the administrative district of Gmina Charsznica, within Miechów County, Lesser Poland Voivodeship, in southern Poland.
