= Uniejów-Parcela =

- Village
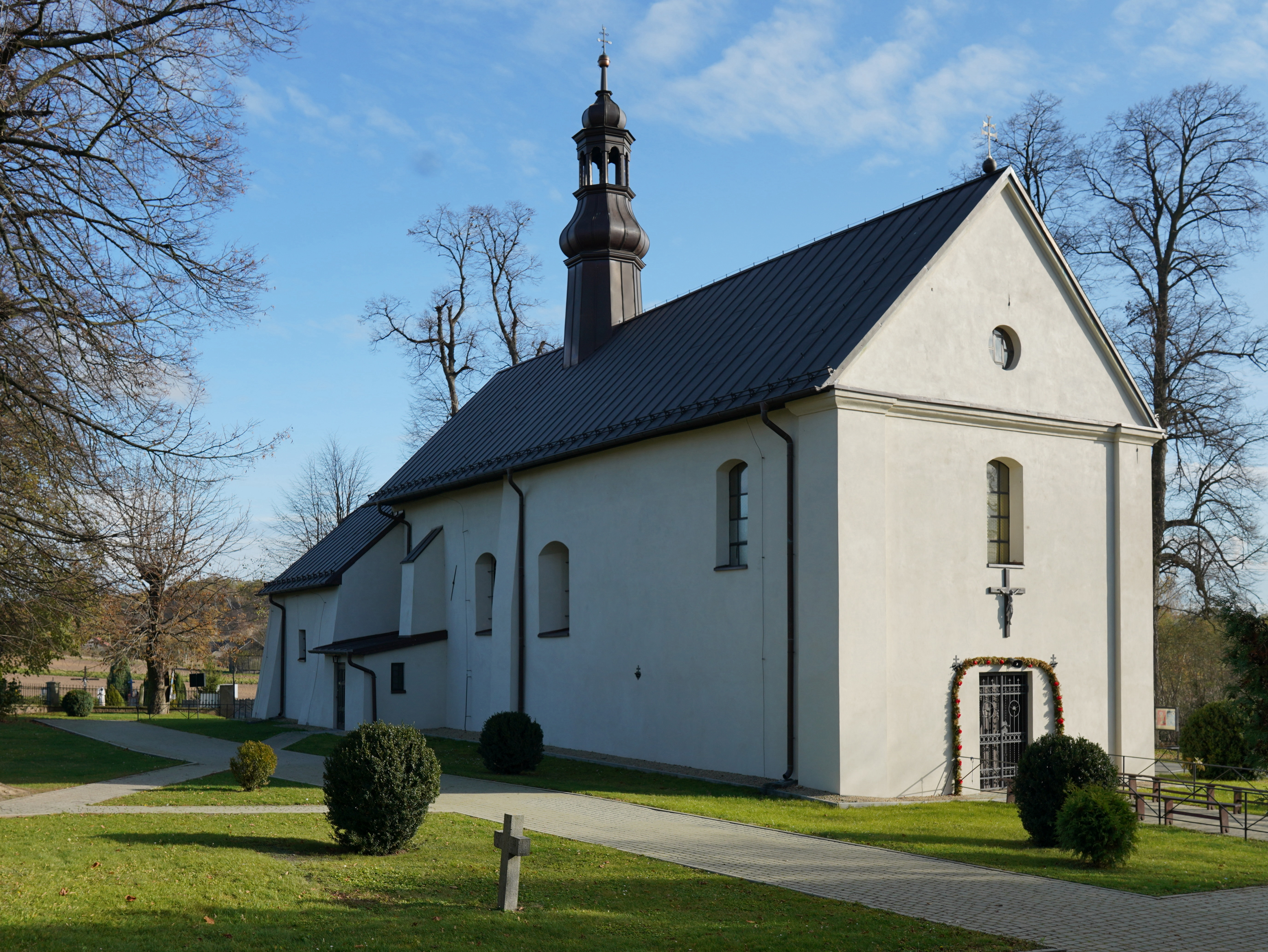
- Catholic church

- Location within Poland
- Coordinates: 50°25′22″N 19°57′0″E
- Country: Poland
- Voivodeship: Lesser Poland
- County: Miechów
- Gmina: Charsznica
- Population: 130

Uniejów-Parcela [uˈɲɛjuf parˈt͡sɛla] is a village in the administrative district of Gmina Charsznica, within Miechów County, Lesser Poland Voivodeship, in southern Poland.
