= Charsznica =

- Village
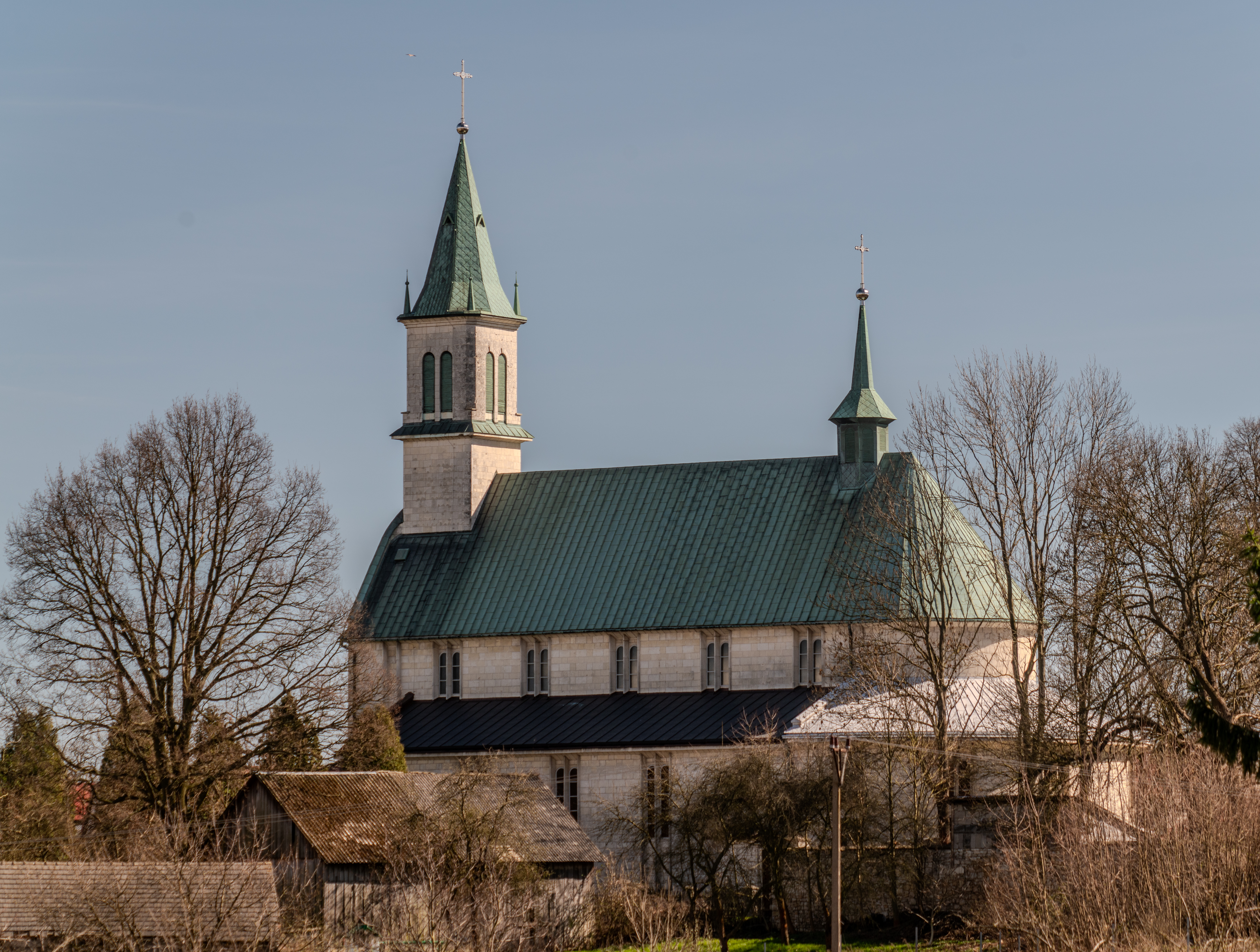
- Our Lady of the Rosary church

- Location within Poland
- Coordinates: 50°24′28″N 19°55′50″E
- Country: Poland
- Voivodeship: Lesser Poland
- County: Miechów
- Gmina: Charsznica

Population
  - Total: 1,900
- Time zone: UTC+1 (CET)
  - Summer (DST): UTC+2 (CEST)
- Website: http://www.charsznica.pl

Charsznica [xarʂˈnit͡sa] is a village in Miechów County, Lesser Poland Voivodeship, in southern Poland. It is the seat of the gmina (administrative district) called Gmina Charsznica.

== History ==
Following the German-Soviet invasion of Poland, which started World War II in September 1939, the village was occupied by Germany until 1945. The local Polish police chief and three further Polish policemen from Charsznica were murdered by the Russians in the Katyn massacre in 1940. The Polish resistance movement was active in Charsznica, including a local unit of the Home Army under the cryptonym "Czajka" (Lapwing).
