= Robert Horstink =

Dutch volleyball player

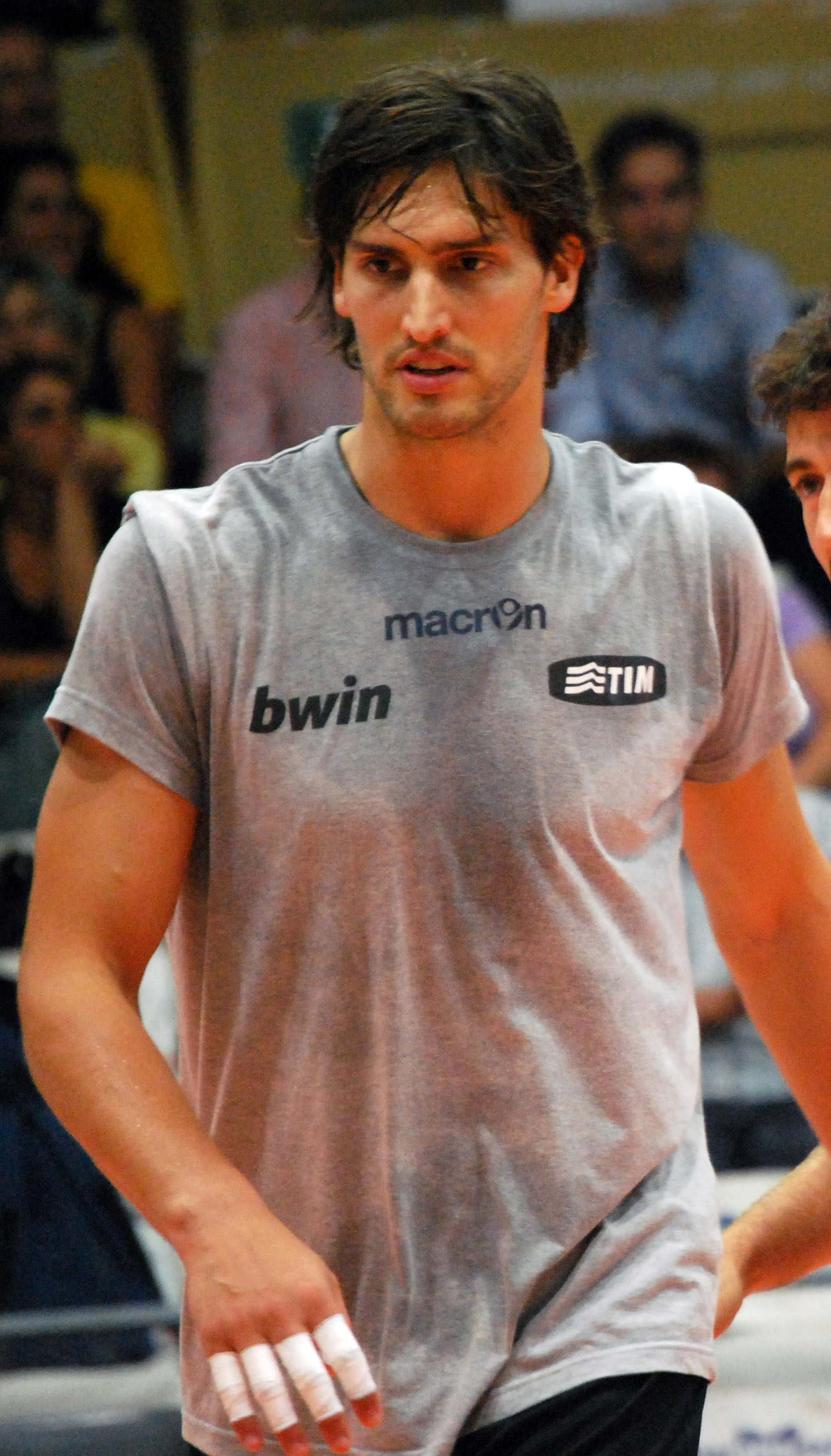

Personal information
- Full name: Robert Horstink
- Nationality: Netherlands
- Born: 26 December 1981 (age 44); Twello
- Height: 2.01 m (6 ft 7 in)
- Weight: 92 kg (203 lb)
- Spike: 360 cm (140 in)
- Block: 350 cm (140 in)

Volleyball information
- Position: Outside hitter
- Current club: (Italy) Sisley Volley
- Number: 4

National team
Netherlands
- Last updated: February 2011

Robert Horstink (born 26 December 1981 in Twello, Gelderland) is a volleyball player from the Netherlands, who represented his native country at the 2004 Summer Olympics in Athens, Greece. There he ended up in ninth place with the Dutch Men's National Team.

He mainly plays as an outside hitter and is known for his vertical jump, his cocky attitude, and his powerful backrow attacks.
