= Podlesice, Lesser Poland Voivodeship =

Podlesice
- Village
- Location within Poland
- Coordinates: 50°23′31″N 19°50′38″E
- Country: Poland
- Voivodeship: Lesser Poland
- County: Miechów
- Gmina: Charsznica

Podlesice [pɔdlɛˈɕit͡sɛ] is a village in the administrative district of Gmina Charsznica, within Miechów County, Lesser Poland Voivodeship, in southern Poland.
