= Uniejów-Rędziny =

- Village
- Location within Poland
- Coordinates: 50°26′11″N 19°58′20″E
- Country: Poland
- Voivodeship: Lesser Poland
- County: Miechów
- Gmina: Charsznica
- Population: 450

Uniejów-Rędziny [uˈɲɛjuf rɛnˈd͡ʑinɨ] is a village in the administrative district of Gmina Charsznica, within Miechów County, Lesser Poland Voivodeship, in southern Poland.
