= Bathmen =

- Village
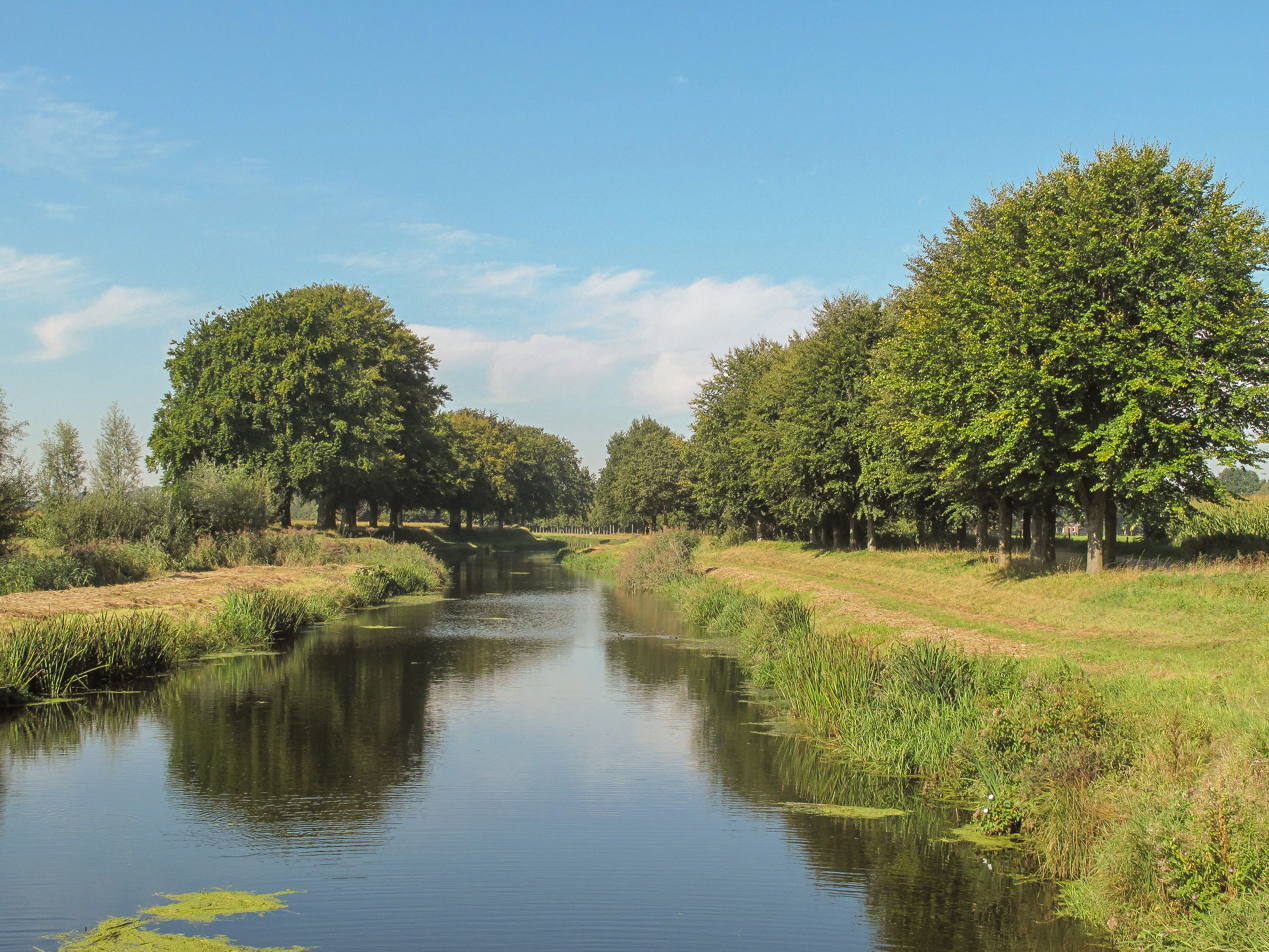
- Landscape between Bathmen and Harfsen

- Flag Coat of arms

- Location in the Netherlands Bathmen (Netherlands)
- Coordinates: 52°15′0″N 6°17′13″E
- Country: Netherlands
- Province: Overijssel
- Municipality: Deventer

Area
  - Total: 31.99 km^{2} (12.35 sq mi)
- Elevation: 10 m (33 ft)

Population (2021)
  - Total: 5,815
  - Density: 181.8/km^{2} (470.8/sq mi)
- Time zone: UTC+1 (CET)
  - Summer (DST): UTC+2 (CEST)
- Postal code: 7437
- Dialing code: 0570
- Website: postcards of Bathmen

Bathmen is a village and former municipality in the east of the Netherlands. The municipality was merged with her larger neighbour of Deventer on 1 January 2005 as part of a national effort to reduce bureaucracy in the country. Its main population centres were Apenhuizen, Bathmen, Dortherhoek, Loo, Pieriksmars and Zuidloo.

It was first mentioned in 1284 as Batmen. The etymology is unclear. In 1840, it was home to 1,507 people. In 1997, Deventer tried to annex Bathmen, but failed.

== Gallery ==
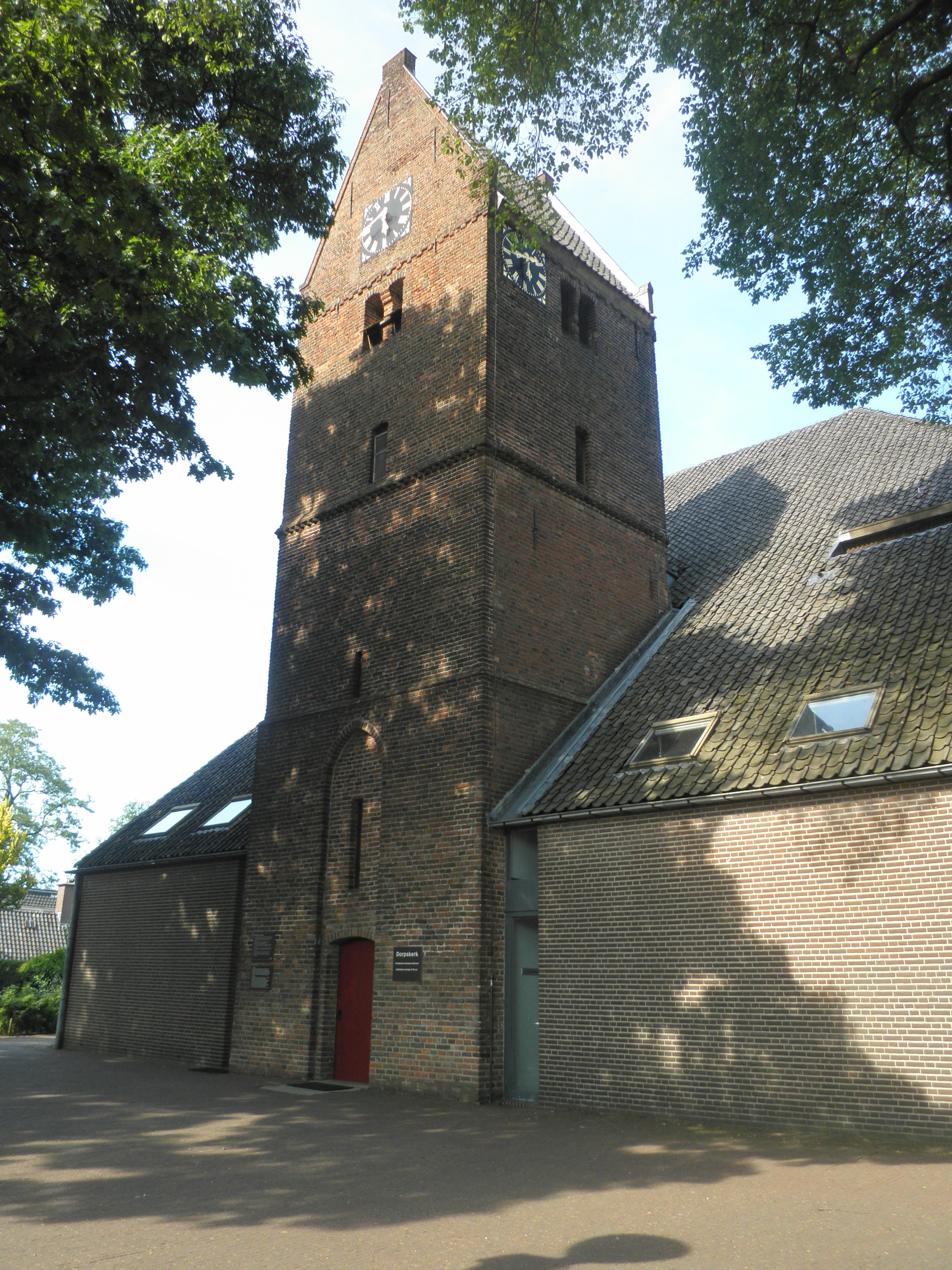
Church in Bathmen

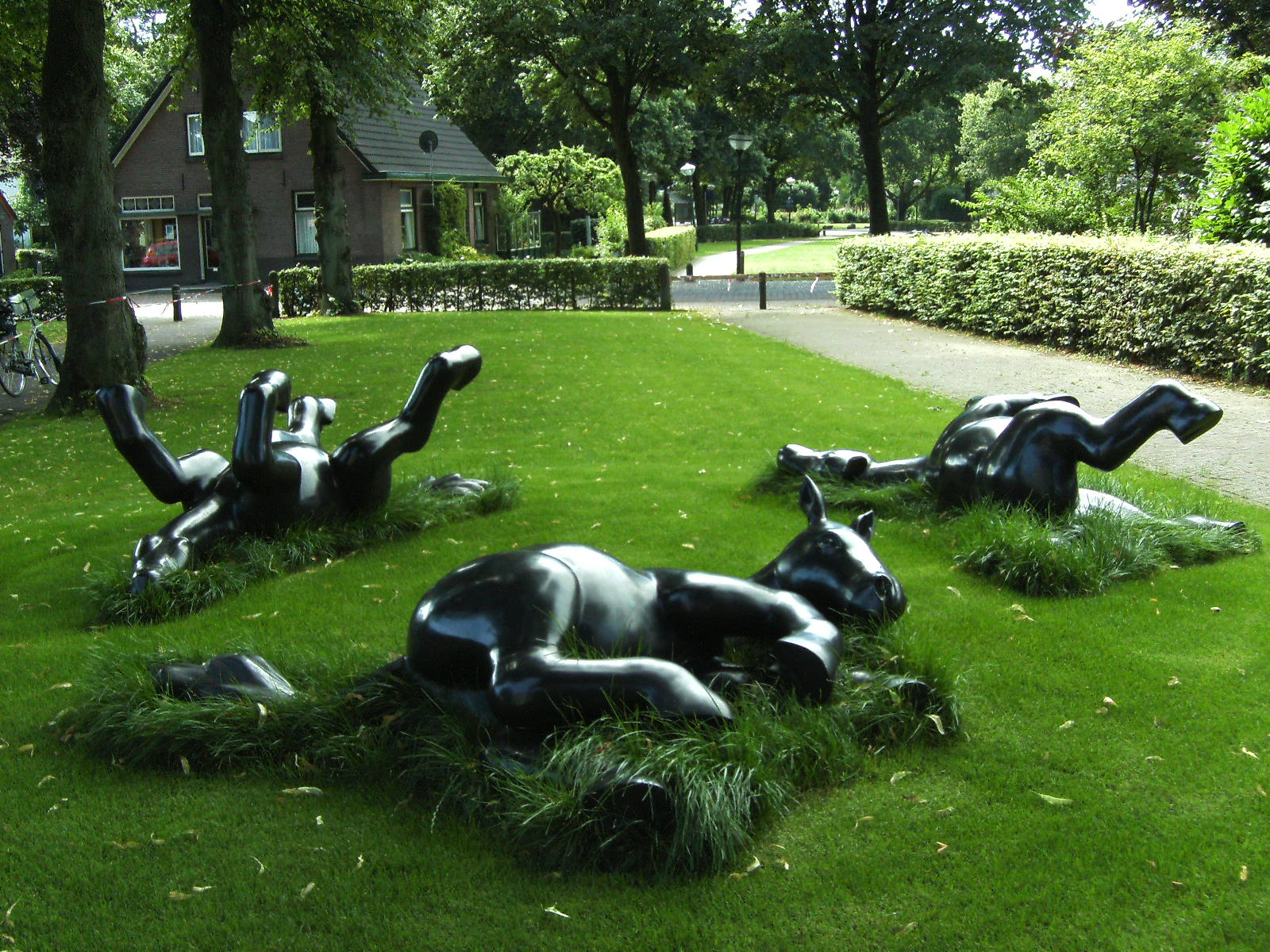
Rolling horses statue by Esther de Jong

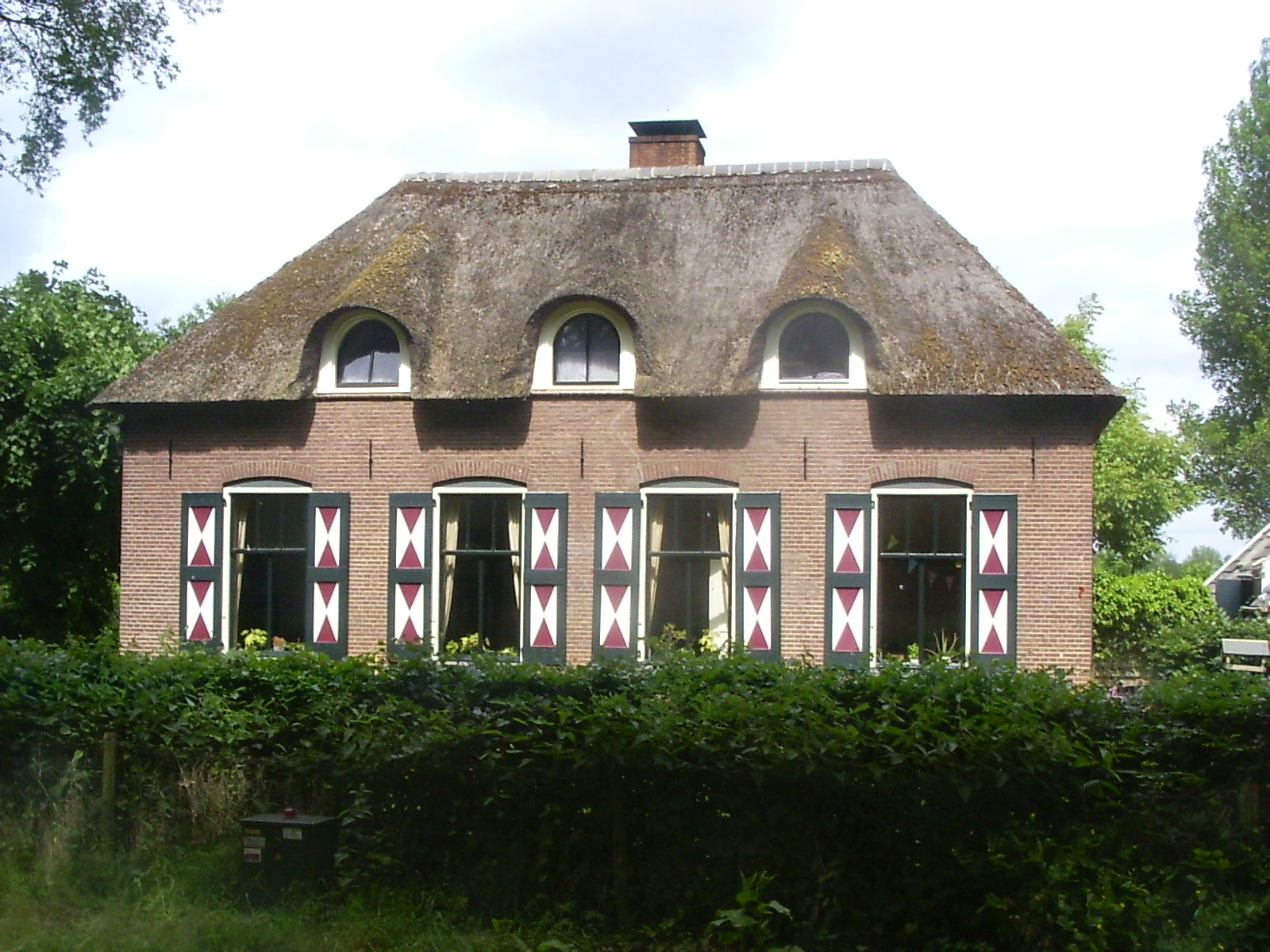
House in Bathmen

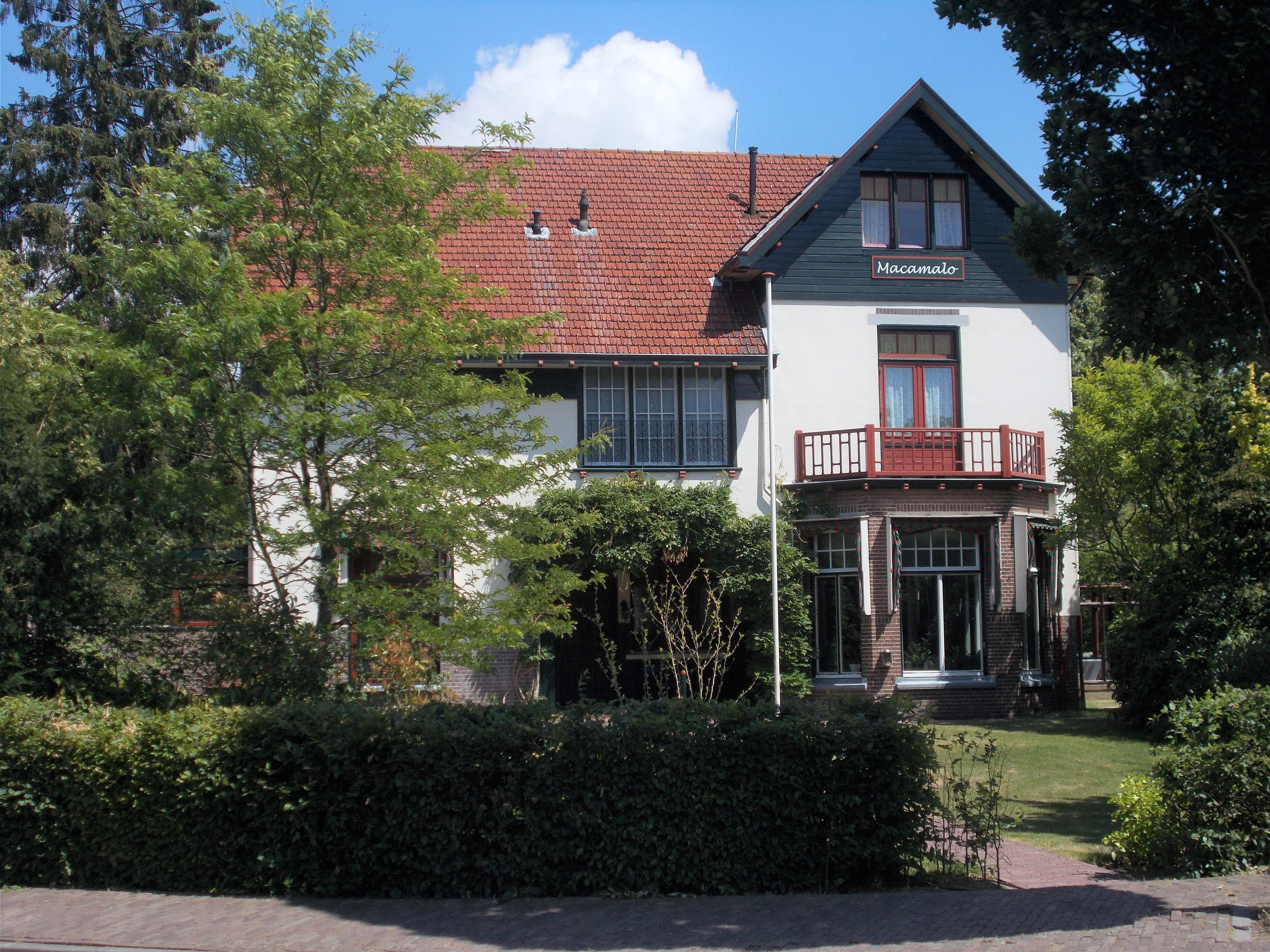
Villa Macamalo
