= Twello =

- Unincorporated town
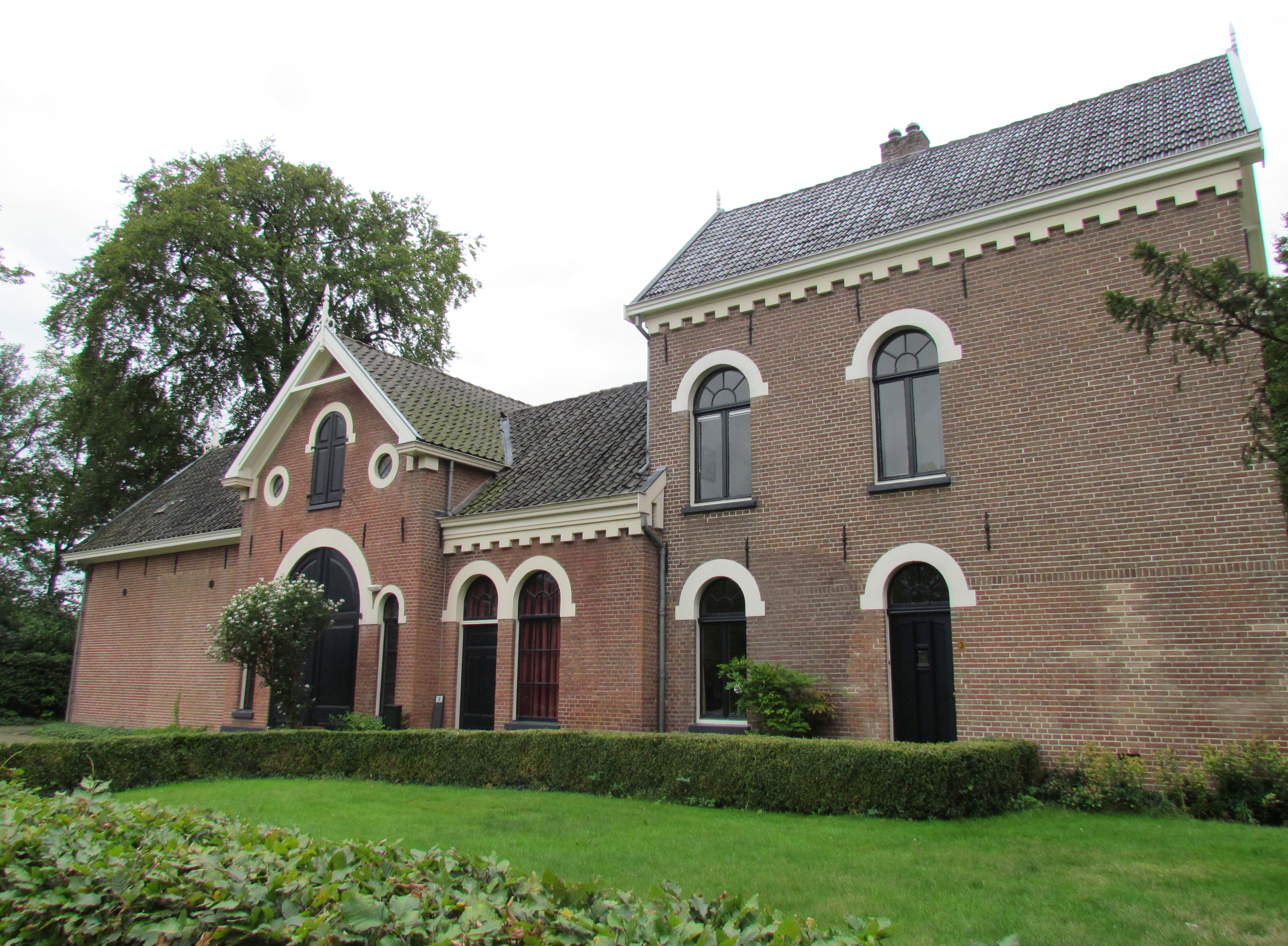
- Eureka service residence

- Coat of arms

- Map of Voorst with Twello highlighted
- Coordinates: 52°14′0″N 6°6′8″E
- Country: Netherlands
- Province: Gelderland
- Municipality: Voorst

Population
  - Total: 13,500

Twello is a village in the Dutch province of Gelderland. It is located in the municipality of Voorst, about 5 km (3 mi) southwest of Deventer. Twello is a village between the cities Deventer and Apeldoorn. It has several primary schools, among them De Hietweide, a public school, which means it has no religion tied to it; Sint Martinus, a Catholic primary school, located in front of the Sint Martinuskerk (see picture); De Wingerd, a Christian primary school located next to the Town Hall and De Kleine Wereld, a Christian primary school. The village also has two high schools for VMBO (voorbereidend middelbaar beroepsonderwijs, pre-vocational secondary education) and the first three grades of HAVO (hoger algemeen voortgezet onderwijs, higher general continued education).

Twello was a separate municipality until 1818, when it was merged with Voorst.

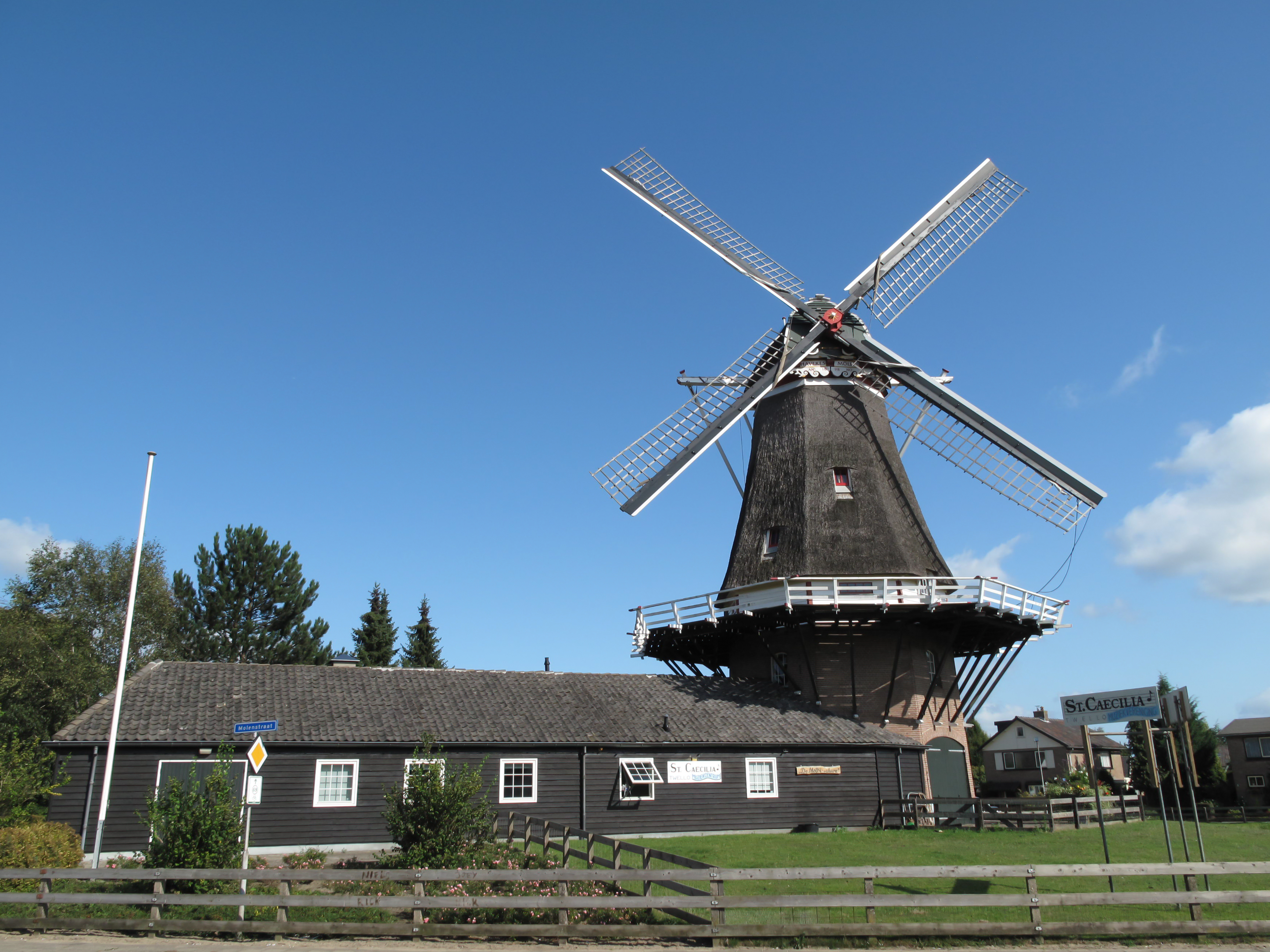
Twello, windmill: Havekes Mölle

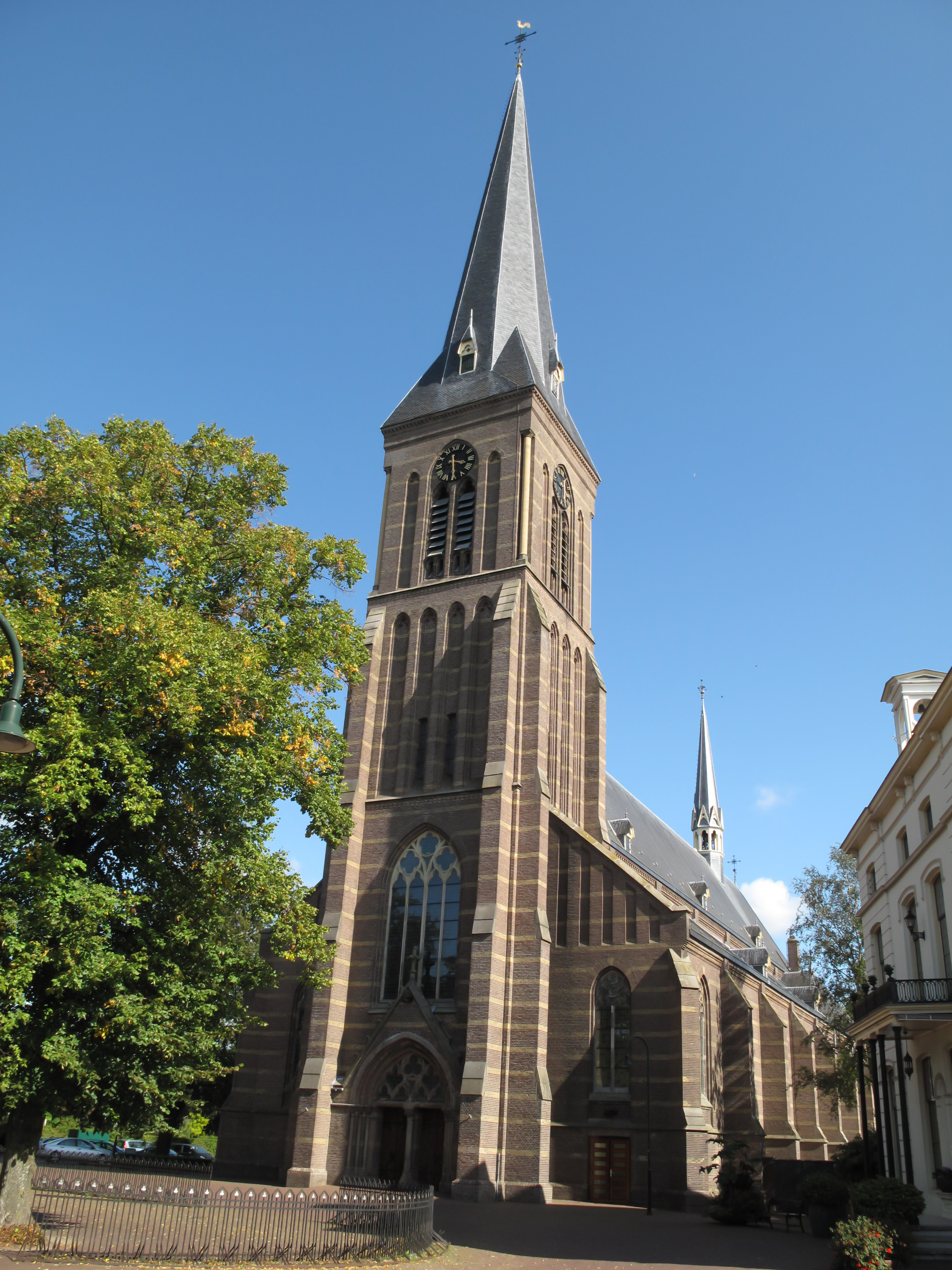
Twello, church: Sint Martinuskerk

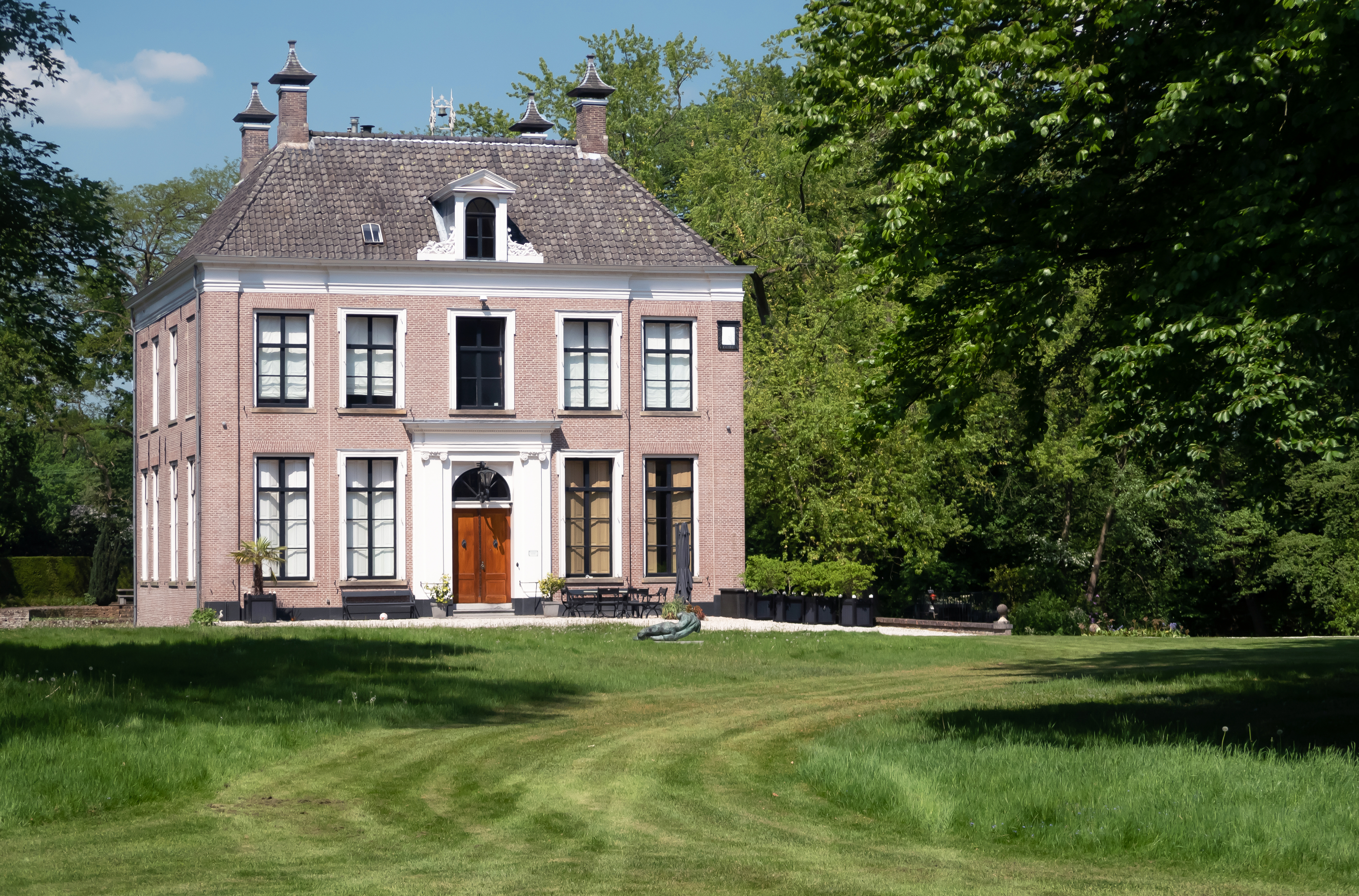
Twello, country house: Huize het Holthuis

== People from Twello ==
- Robert Horstink, volleyball player
