= Leeuwarden =

Leeuwarden Ljouwert (West Frisian) Liwwadden / Leewarden (Stadsfries Dutch)
- City and municipality
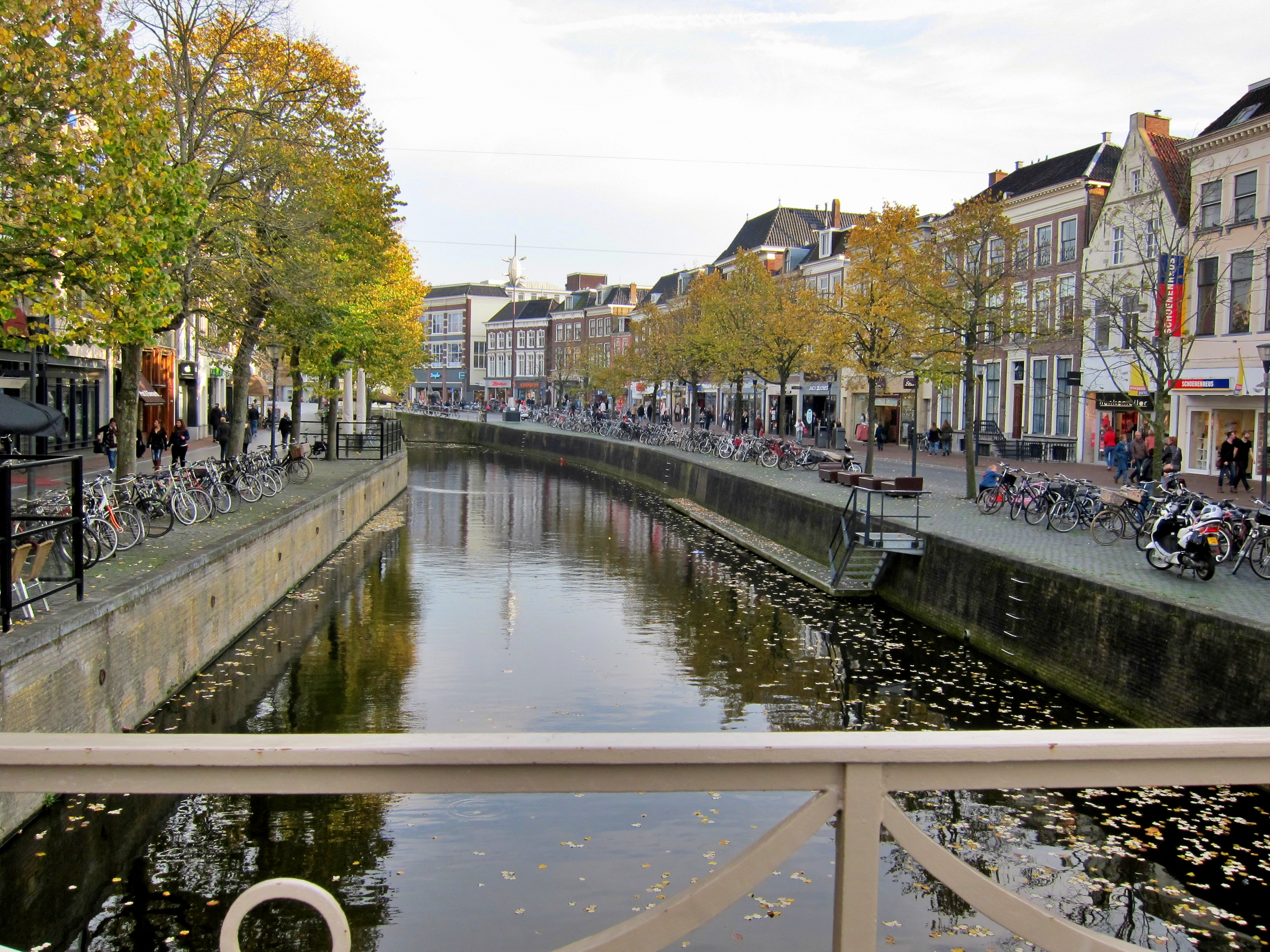
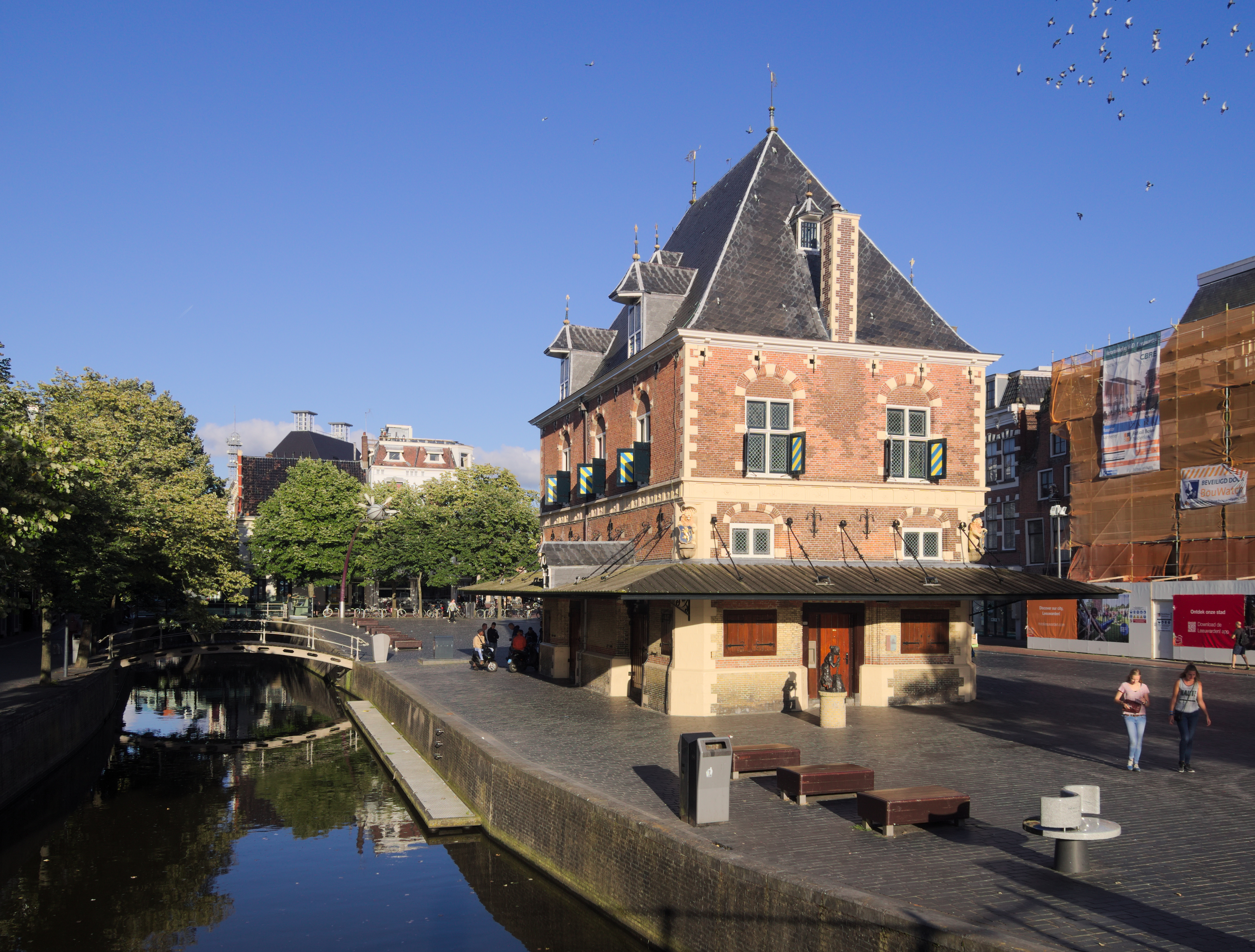
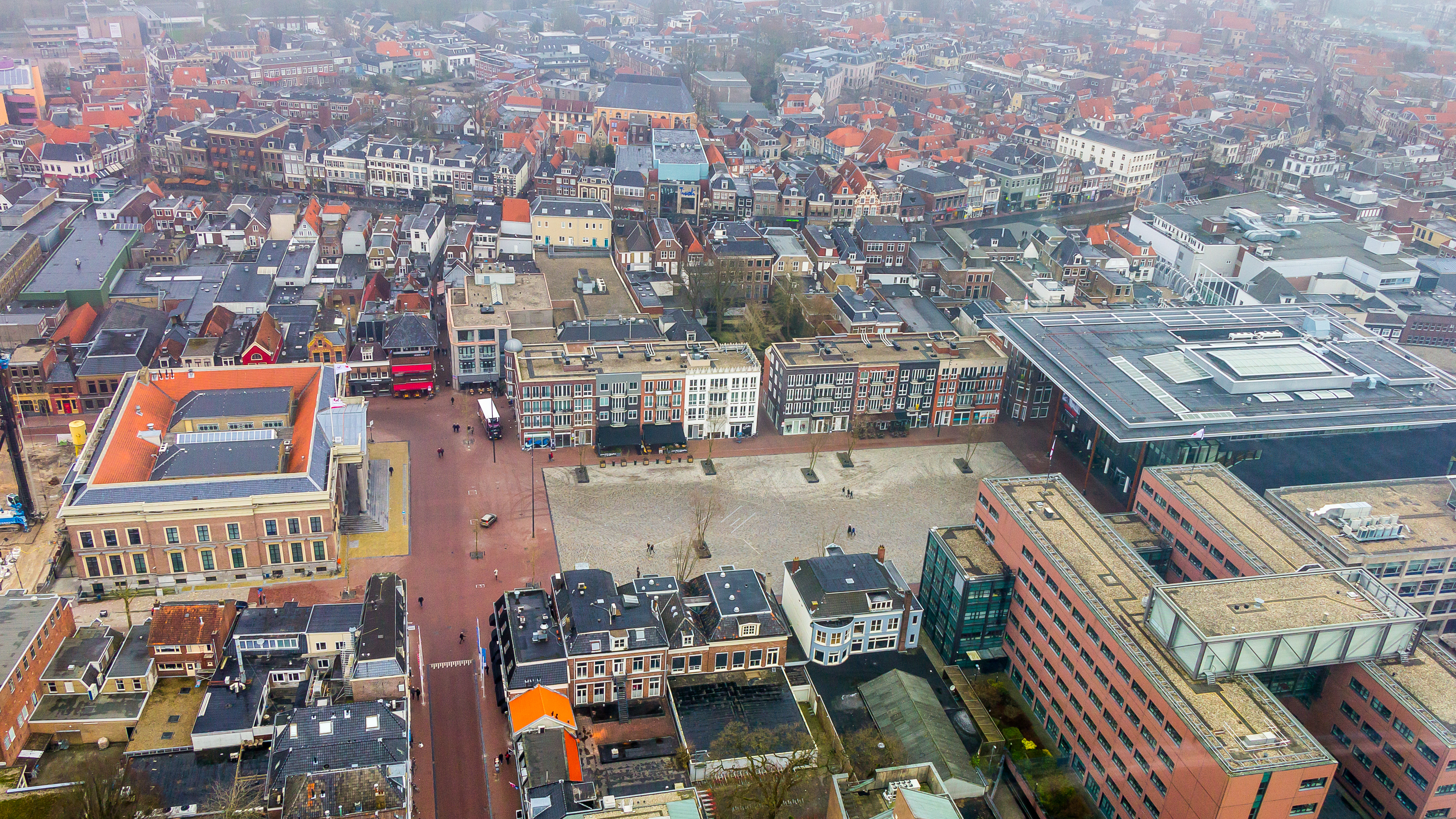
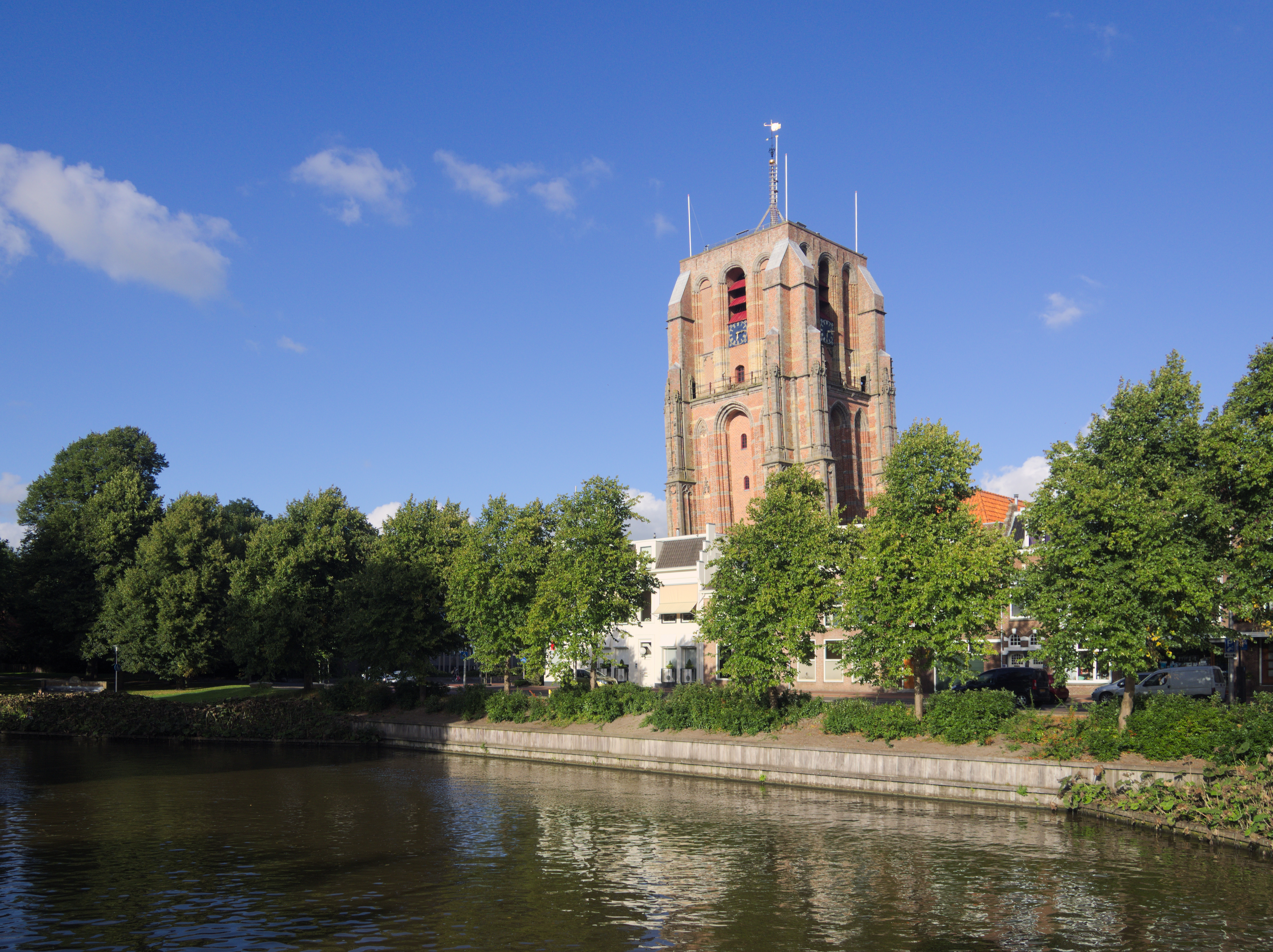
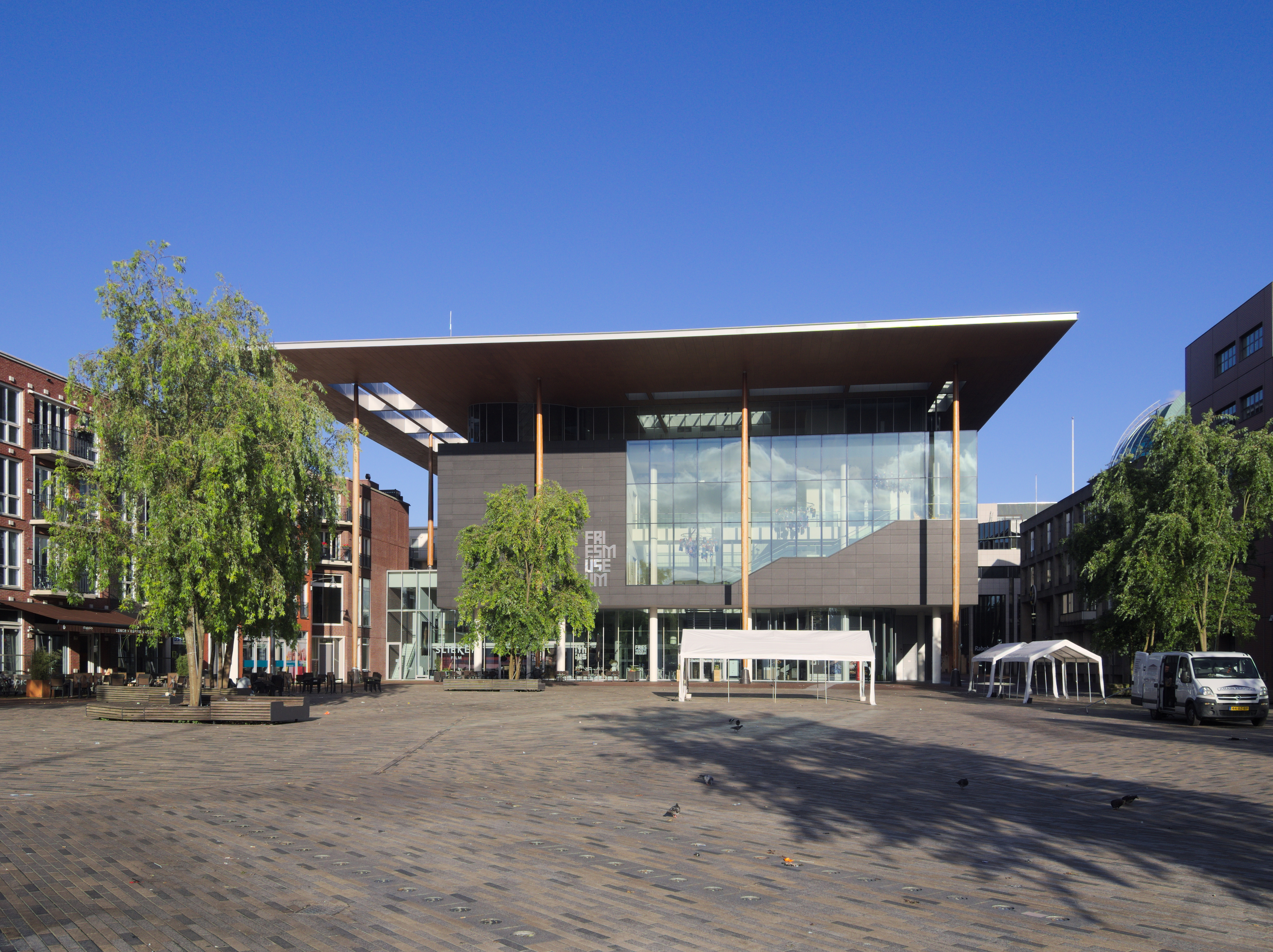
- Leeuwarden canal Former weigh house Leeuwarden centre Oldehove Fries Museum

- Flag Coat of arms Brandmark

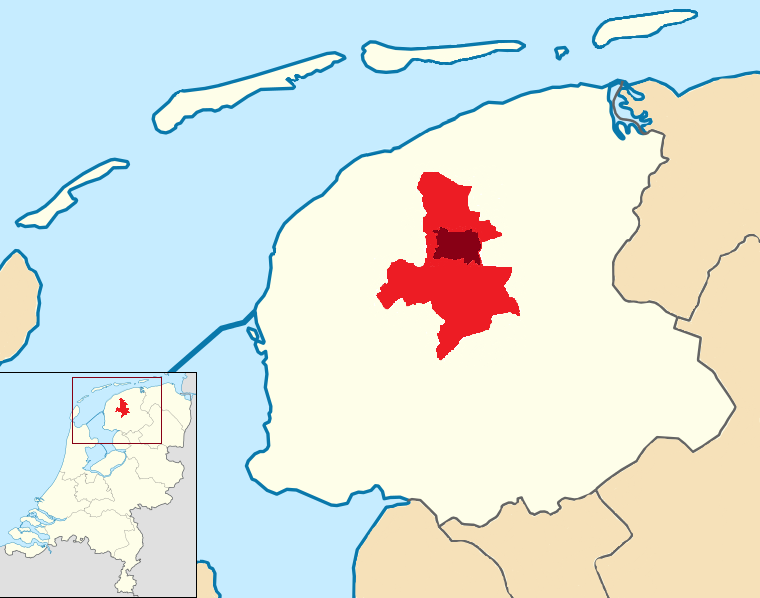
- Location of the municipality (red) and the city (dark red) in the province of Friesland in the Netherlands

- Location within the Netherlands Location within Europe
- Coordinates: 53°12′N 5°47′E
- Country: Netherlands
- Province: Friesland

Government
  - Body: Municipal council
  - Mayor: Foort van Oosten (Interim) (VVD)

Area
  - Municipality: 255.62 km^{2} (98.70 sq mi)
  - Land: 238.38 km^{2} (92.04 sq mi)
  - Water: 17.24 km^{2} (6.66 sq mi)
- Elevation: 3.2 m (10 ft)
- Highest elevation: 5.2 m (17 ft)
- Lowest elevation: 1.9 m (6.2 ft)

Population (Municipality, January 2021; Urban and Metro, May 2014)
  - Municipality: 124,481
  - Density: 522/km^{2} (1,350/sq mi)
  - Urban: 108,254
  - Metro: 174,724
- Demonym: Leeuwarder
- Time zone: UTC+1 (CET)
  - Summer (DST): UTC+2 (CEST)
- Postcode: 8900–8941
- Area code: 058
- Website: www.leeuwarden.nl

Leeuwarden (Dutch: [ˈleːu.ɑrdə(n)]; West Frisian: Ljouwert [ˈljɔu(ə)t]; Stadsfries Dutch: Liwwadden; Leeuwarder dialect: Leewarden) is a city and municipality in Friesland, Netherlands, with a population of 130,162 (2026). It is the provincial capital and seat of the Provincial Council of Friesland.

The region has been continuously inhabited since the 10th century. It came to be known as Leeuwarden in the early 9th century AD and was granted city privileges in 1435. It is the main economic hub of Friesland, situated in a green and water-rich environment. Leeuwarden is a former royal residence and has a historic city centre, many historically relevant buildings, and a large shopping centre with squares and restaurants. Leeuwarden was awarded the title European Capital of Culture for 2018. Also, Leeuwarden has been a UNESCO City of Literature since 2019.

The Elfstedentocht (Eleven Cities Tour), an ice skating tour passing the eleven cities of Friesland, starts and finishes in Leeuwarden.

The following towns and villages within the municipality have populations in excess of 1,000 people: Leeuwarden, Stiens, Grou, Goutum, Wergea, Jirnsum, Reduzum, and Wirdum. The municipality is governed by the interim mayor Foort van Oosten and a coalition of the Labour Party, Christian Democratic Appeal, and GreenLeft.

== Etymology ==
The name "Leeuwarden" (or older variants of it) first came into use for Nijehove, the most important of the three villages (the other two being Oldehove and Hoek) which in the early 9th century merged into Leeuwarden (Villa Lintarwrde c. 825). There is much uncertainty about the origin of the city's name. Historian and archivist Wopke Eekhoff summed up a total of over 200 different spelling variants, of which Leeuwarden (Dutch), Liwwadden (Stadsfries), and Ljouwert (West Frisian) are still in use.

The second part of the name is easily explained: Warden, West Frisian/Dutch/Low German for an artificial dwelling-hill, is a designation of terps, reflecting the historical situation.

The first part of the name, leeuw, means lion in modern standard Dutch. This interpretation corresponds with the coat of arms adopted by the city, canting arms featuring a heraldic lion. However, modern standard Dutch was not used in this region in the Middle Ages, when the city was called Lintarwrde. Some scholars argue that the name of the city is derived from leeu-, a corruption of luw- (Dutch for 'sheltered from the wind', cf. the maritime term leeward) or from lee- (a Dutch word for waterway). 'Sheltered landing place or harbour' could be the original meaning. This suits the watery province of Friesland and the position of the original three villages at the end of an important estuary called Middelzee.

The name is also similar to that of the French commune Lewarde, located in the Nord Department, an originally Flemish-speaking area annexed to France in the 17th century. Western Flemish was related to Frisian and also to Saxon up to the 11th century.

== History ==
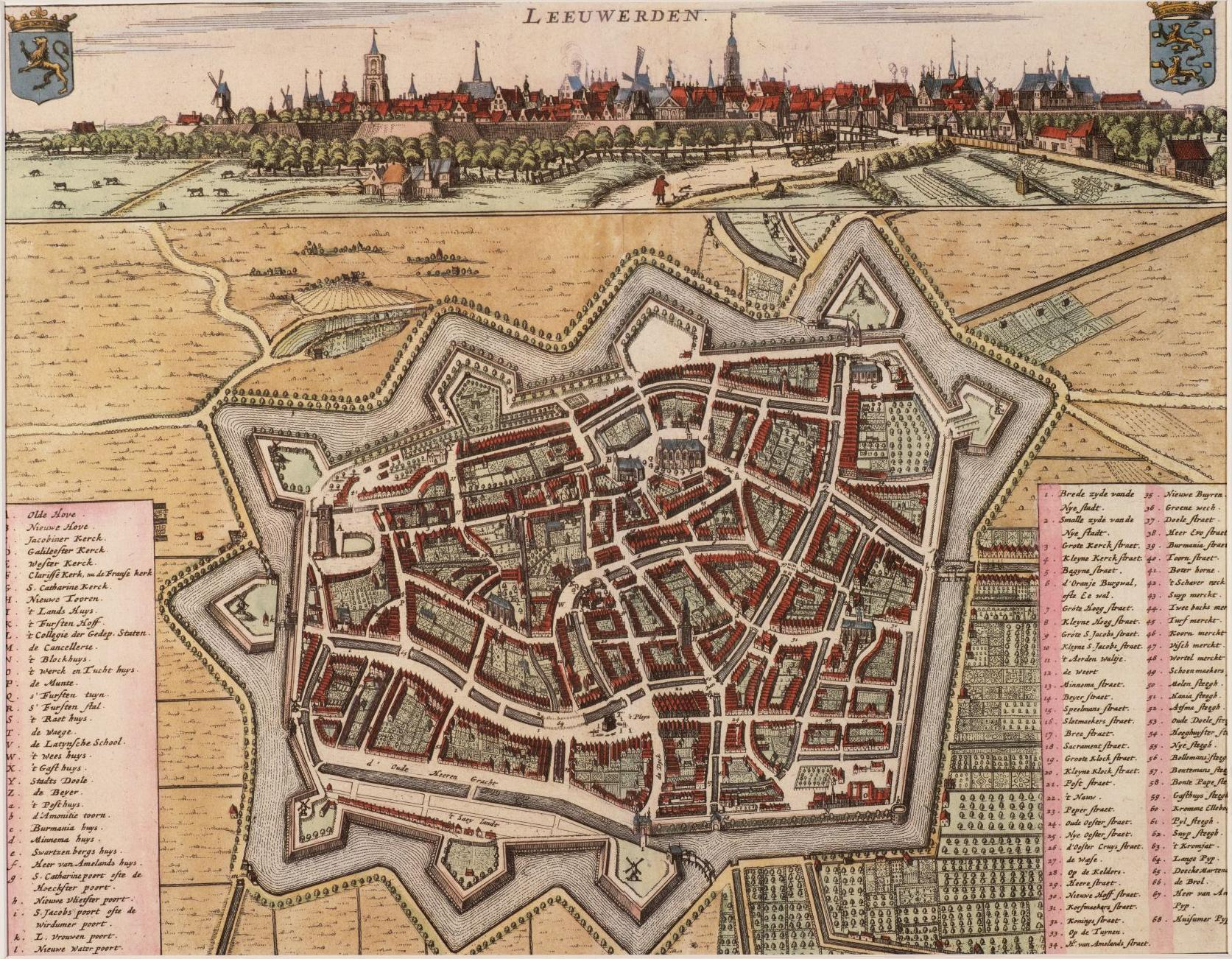
Historical map of Leeuwarden 1664

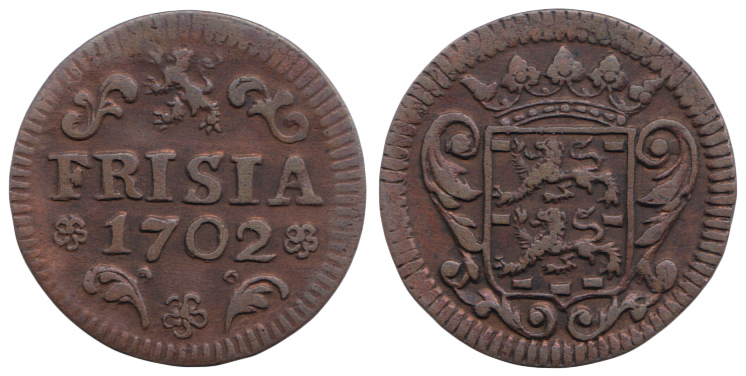
Copper 1 duit coin minted in Leeuwarden in 1702. The obverse depicts the province's coat of arms.

The oldest remains of houses date back to the 2nd century AD in the Roman era and were discovered during an excavation near the Oldehove. Inhabited continuously since the 10th century, the city's first reference as a population centre is in German sources from 1285, and records exist of city privileges granted in 1435. Situated along the Middelzee, it was an active centre of maritime trade. The waterway silted-up in the 13th century.

Historical population
Year	Pop.	±% p.a.
1511	4,360	—
1565	6,600	+0.77%
1606	11,330	+1.33%
1666	16,500	+0.63%
1689	14,300	−0.62%
1744	13,490	−0.11%
1793	16,446	+0.41%
1795	12,707	−12.10%
Source: Lourens & Lucassen 1997, pp. 13–15 (1398–1795)

The Grote or Jacobijnerkerk (English: Great, or Jacobin Church) is the oldest building in the city. The 15th century was the period of the two opposing Frisian factional parties Vetkopers and Schieringers. The bastions and a moat were built in the period 1481–1494. In 1747 William IV, Prince of Orange was the last stadtholder residing in the Stadhouderlijk Hof. In the first half of the 19th century the fortifications were demolished.

From 1580 to 1752, a provincial mint operated in the city, minting gold, silver and copper coins of Friesland.

The Jewish community of Leeuwarden was one of the earliest in the Netherlands aside from Amsterdam, and was first mentioned in 1645. By 1670, the city council granted a man referred to as "Jacob the Jew" (in Dutch) permission to build a Jewish cemetery, meaning that there were enough Jews living there to require a cemetery and other communal institutions. Land for 'The Jodenkerkhof' (Jews' cemetery) was purchased in 1679, near the Oldehove tower.

The first synagogue in the city was built in the 17th century, and was also used by the city's Catholics who were not allowed to build a house of worship of their own because of the Protestant city authorities. The Jewish community enjoyed generally good relations with authorities in the 18th century and continued to expand throughout the 18th and 19th centuries, reaching a peak population of 1,236 in 1860.

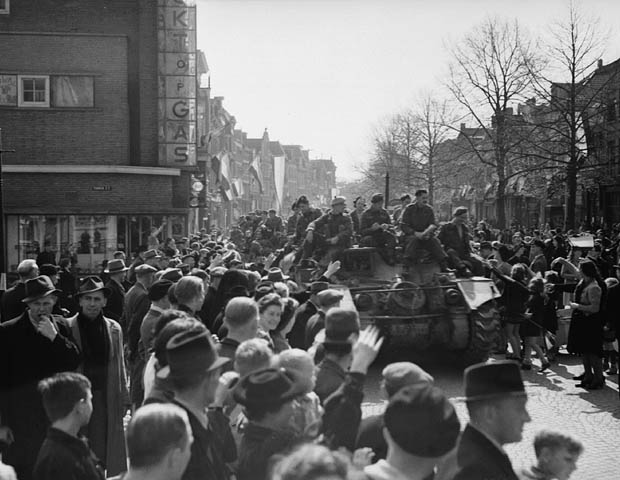
Citizens of Leeuwarden welcoming units of the Canadian Army, 16 April 1945

In 1901 the city's population was 32,203.

Leeuwarden, like the rest of the Netherlands, was occupied by German forces in 1940–1945. The occupation of Leeuwarden ended when elements of the Royal Canadian Dragoons seized the initiative and advanced into the heavily-defended city on 15 April 1945, ignoring direct orders to wait for supporting infantry. German forces had been driven out by the end of the next day. (The anniversary is marked by both the Dragoons and the city, by flying each others' flags every 15 April.)

Kneppelfreed (English: Baton Friday) was an incident on 16 November 1951 in front of the courthouse at Wilhelminaplein (Wilhelmina Square), when the police used batons against Frisian language activists during a protest against the exclusive use of Dutch in the courts. A committee of inquiry recommended that the Frisian language should receive legal status as a minority language.

On 19 October 2013, a fire broke out in a clothes shop on a busy pedestrian street. The fire started late in the afternoon and burned through the night, destroying five shops and eleven flats. The only casualty was a 24-year-old man who was living in one of the flats. The birthplace of Mata Hari was at first thought to be destroyed, but survived, albeit with considerable smoke and water damage.

== Heraldry ==
The coat of arms of Leeuwarden is the official symbol of the municipality. It consists of a blue escutcheon, a golden lion, and a crown. The fact that Leeuwarden carries a lion in its seal seems logical, considering that "Leeuw" is Dutch for "Lion". However, it is very plausible the oldest name of the city conceals an indication of water rather than an animal, and some sources suggest that the lion may have only been added after the name became official. It is also possible the coat of arms was a gift to the city from the powerful Minnema family.

== Geography ==
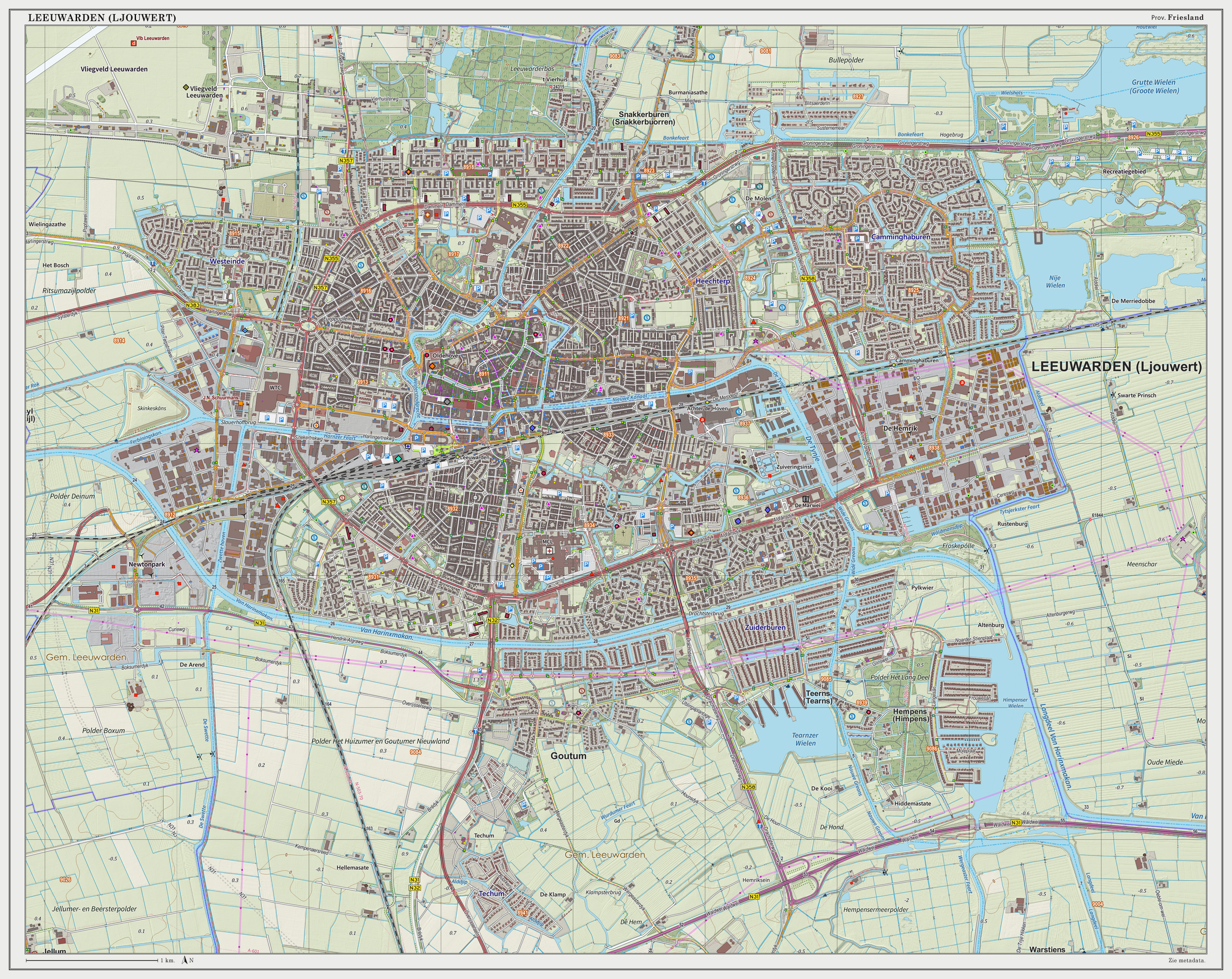
Map of the city of Leeuwarden (2014)

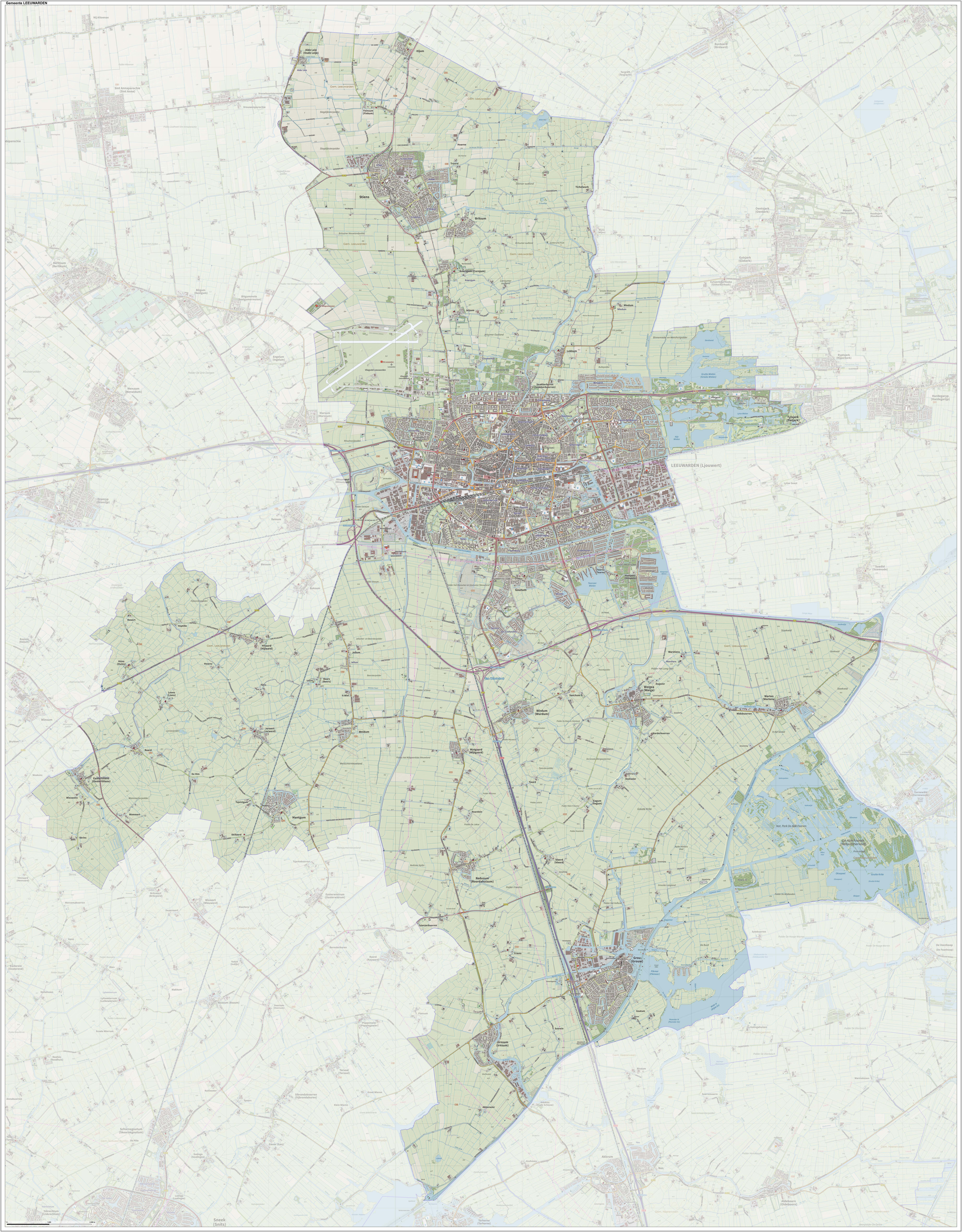
Dutch topographic map of the municipality of Leeuwarden

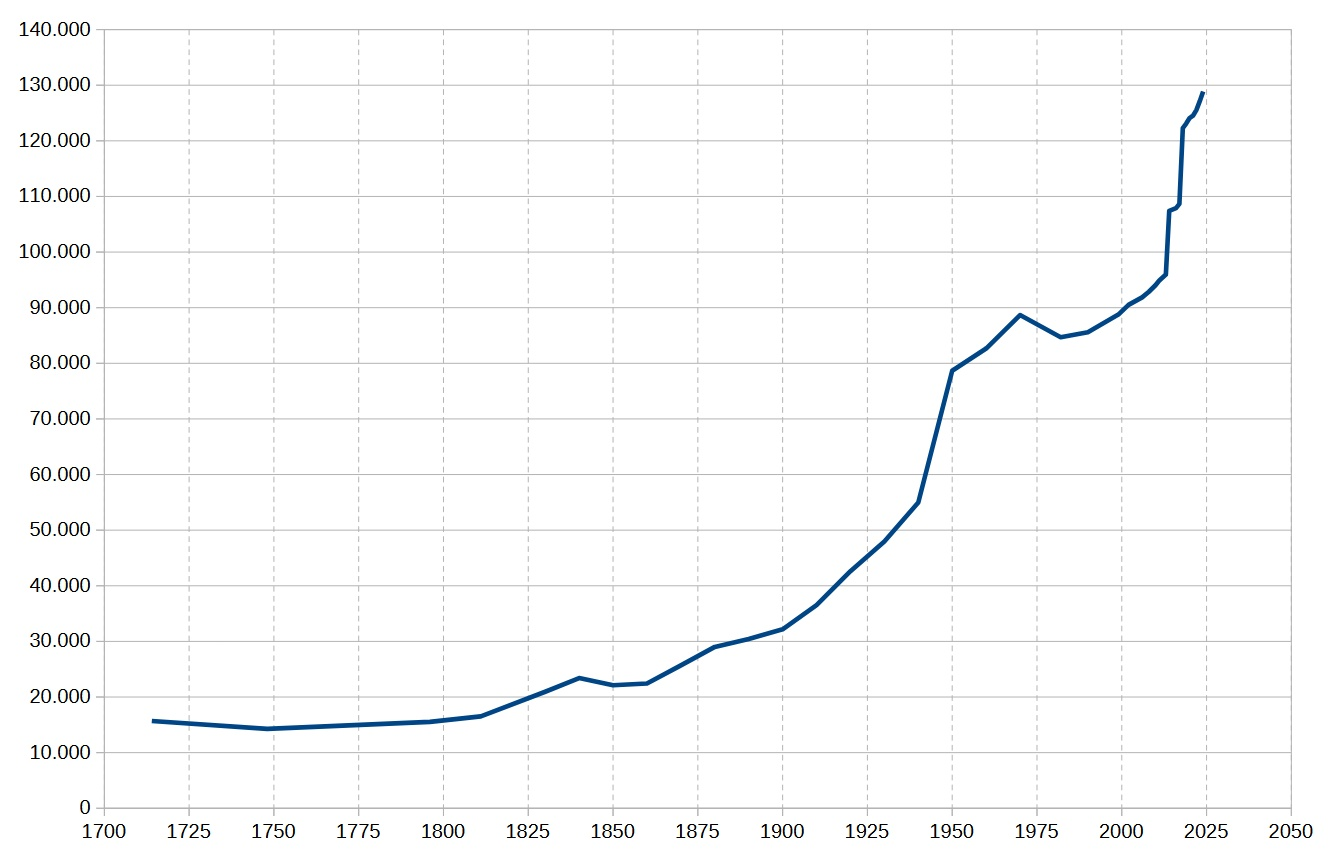
Historical population municipality (1714–2024).

Leeuwarden is located centrally in Friesland. The military Leeuwarden Air Base lies northwest of the city. East of the city lies recreational area and nature reserve De Groene Ster. It contains the windmill Himriksmole, a golf course and AquaZoo Leeuwarden.

=== Population centres ===
On 1 January 2014 parts of the neighbouring Boarnsterhim municipality were added to Leeuwarden. On 1 January 2018 it was enlarged by Leeuwarderadeel and parts of former municipality of Littenseradiel.

Dutch name	West Frisian name	Population
Leeuwarden	Ljouwert	92,146
Stiens	Stiens	7,545
Grouw	Grou	5,655
Goutum	Goutum	2,945
Warga	Wergea	1,685
Irnsum	Jirnsum	1,360
Wirdum	Wurdum	1,210
Mantgum	Mantgum	1,175
Roordahuizum	Reduzum	1,125
Britsum	Britsum	960
Wartena	Warten	915
Wytgaard	Wytgaard	570
Weidum	Weidum	570
Cornjum	Koarnjum	435
Oosterlittens	Easterlittens	435
Lekkum	Lekkum	425
Hijum	Hijum	415
Jorwerd	Jorwert	335
Jelsum	Jelsum	325
Hijlaard	Hilaard	295
Oude Leije	Alde Leie	255
Snakkerburen	Snakkerbuorren	225
Finkum	Feinsum	205
Baard	Baard	185
Hempens	Himpens	155
Jellum	Jellum	150
Beers	Bears	125
Huins	Húns	115
Idaard	Idaerd	80
Friens	Friens	80
Swichum	Swichum	50
Warstiens	Warstiens	35
Aegum	Eagum	35
Miedum	Miedum	30
Lions	Leons	26
Teerns	Tearns	16
Total		122,293
Source: Statistics Netherlands

=== Hamlets ===
The hamlets within the municipality are: Abbenwier, Angwier, Baarderbuorren, Bartlehiem (partially), De Him, De Hoek, De Trije Romers, Domwier, Finsterbuorren, Fûns, Groote Bontekoe, Goatum, Hesens, Hoarne, Hoptille, It Hoflân, It Wiel, Marwert, Midsbuorren, Narderbuorren, Noardein, Oude Schouw (partially), Poelhuzen, Rewert (partially), Skillaerd, Skrins, Suderbuorren, Suorein, Tichelwurk, Truerd, Tsienzerbuorren, Tsjaard, Tsjeintgum, Vierhuis, Vrouwbuurtstermolen (partially), Wammert and Wieuwens

=== Climate ===
Climate data for Leeuwarden (1991−2020 normals, extremes 1951−present)
Month	Jan	Feb	Mar	Apr	May	Jun	Jul	Aug	Sep	Oct	Nov	Dec	Year
Record high °C (°F)	13.1 (55.6)	16.7 (62.1)	23.7 (74.7)	27.6 (81.7)	29.6 (85.3)	33.1 (91.6)	34.8 (94.6)	33.5 (92.3)	30.2 (86.4)	25.5 (77.9)	18.2 (64.8)	14.2 (57.6)	34.8 (94.6)
Mean daily maximum °C (°F)	5.3 (41.5)	5.9 (42.6)	9.1 (48.4)	13.2 (55.8)	16.5 (61.7)	19.1 (66.4)	21.4 (70.5)	21.6 (70.9)	18.5 (65.3)	14.0 (57.2)	9.2 (48.6)	6.1 (43.0)	13.3 (55.9)
Daily mean °C (°F)	3.1 (37.6)	3.2 (37.8)	5.5 (41.9)	8.8 (47.8)	12.2 (54.0)	15.0 (59.0)	17.3 (63.1)	17.4 (63.3)	14.5 (58.1)	10.7 (51.3)	6.7 (44.1)	3.9 (39.0)	9.9 (49.8)
Mean daily minimum °C (°F)	0.5 (32.9)	0.3 (32.5)	1.9 (35.4)	4.2 (39.6)	7.6 (45.7)	10.5 (50.9)	12.9 (55.2)	12.9 (55.2)	10.5 (50.9)	7.2 (45.0)	3.9 (39.0)	1.2 (34.2)	6.1 (43.0)
Record low °C (°F)	−19.9 (−3.8)	−20.9 (−5.6)	−16.3 (2.7)	−6.6 (20.1)	−3.0 (26.6)	1.3 (34.3)	5.5 (41.9)	5.4 (41.7)	1.7 (35.1)	−6.5 (20.3)	−14.2 (6.4)	−19.2 (−2.6)	−20.9 (−5.6)
Average precipitation mm (inches)	68.6 (2.70)	55.5 (2.19)	49.1 (1.93)	39.1 (1.54)	54.5 (2.15)	69.9 (2.75)	77.7 (3.06)	93.7 (3.69)	82.3 (3.24)	79.6 (3.13)	77.9 (3.07)	81.5 (3.21)	829.4 (32.65)
Average precipitation days (≥ 1.0 mm)	13.2	11.0	10.0	8.4	8.9	10.3	11.0	11.4	11.7	13.1	14.5	14.2	137.6
Average relative humidity (%)	89.0	86.9	83.3	79.3	78.4	79.6	80.1	80.9	84.1	86.6	90.1	90.3	84.0
Mean monthly sunshine hours	68.0	94.2	149.9	201.2	231.5	209.2	226.1	206.5	155.6	118.4	67.2	61.4	1,789.2
Percentage possible sunshine	26.9	33.8	40.7	48.0	47.2	41.3	44.4	45.0	40.7	35.8	25.7	26.0	38.0
Source: Royal Netherlands Meteorological Institute

== Demographics ==
As of 2020, Leeuwarden had a total population of 124,084.

=== Inhabitants by origin ===
2020	Numbers	%
Dutch natives	102,099	82.2%
Western migration background	9,745	7.8%
Non-Western migration background	12,240	9.8%
Indonesia	2,276	1.83%
Netherlands Antilles and Aruba	1,589	1.28%
Suriname	1,483	1.19%
Morocco	1,081	0.87%
Turkey	547	0.4%
Total	124,084	100%

== Culture ==
=== Museums ===
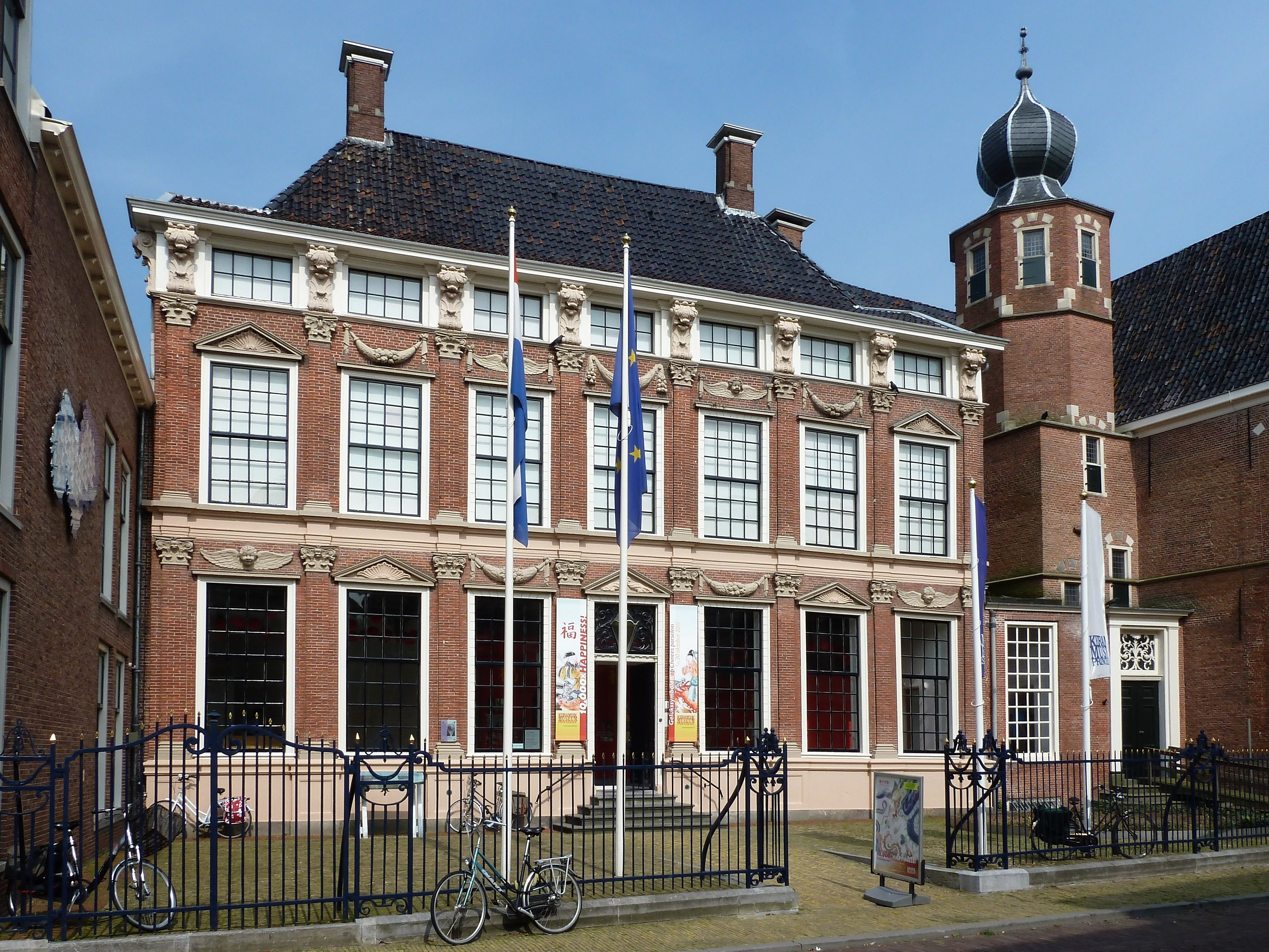
Princessehof Ceramics Museum

Museums in the city of Leeuwarden:

- Fries Museum. An art, culture and history museum. The building (2013) was designed by Hubert-Jan Henket.
  - Fries Verzetsmuseum, a museum that documents the impact of World War II on Friesland. The museum is part of the Fries Museum.
- Princessehof Ceramics Museum, a ceramics museum.
- Pier Pander Museum, an art museum dedicated to the works of sculptor Pier Pander.
- Natuurmuseum Fryslân, a natural history museum.
- The Other Museum. Collections: old-timers, model trains, lace and photography, radio and Meccano.
- Tresoar, a historical centre and museum with archives about Friesland.
- Fries Landbouwmuseum, an agricultural museum.

=== Architecture ===
There are over 800 Rijksmonuments (national heritage sites) in the municipality of Leeuwarden. The Oldehove, a leaning unfinished church tower, is a symbol of the city. Other well-known buildings in the city centre include the Kanselarij (former chancellery), the Stadhouderlijk Hof (former residence of the stadtholders of Friesland), the city hall (1715), the Waag (old weigh house), the Saint Boniface church (an important part of the neogothic movement) and the Centraal Apotheek, a pharmacy in the Art Nouveau style. The Blokhuispoort is a former prison that has been transformed into a public library, hostel and restaurant.

The Froskepôlemolen (built in 1896), is the last surviving windmill to have stood in Leeuwarden. The remains of the Cammingha-Buurstermolen were demolished in 2000. The Slauerhoffbrug is a fully automatic bascule bridge named after the poet Jan Jacob Slauerhoff. It uses two arms to swing a section of road in and out of place within the road itself. This movable bridge is also known as the 'Flying' Drawbridge.

The tallest building in the city is the 114-metre (374 ft) Achmeatoren (Achmea insurance tower), built in 2001 and designed by Abe Bonnema – who also designed the second-tallest building, Averotoren at 77 m (253 ft).

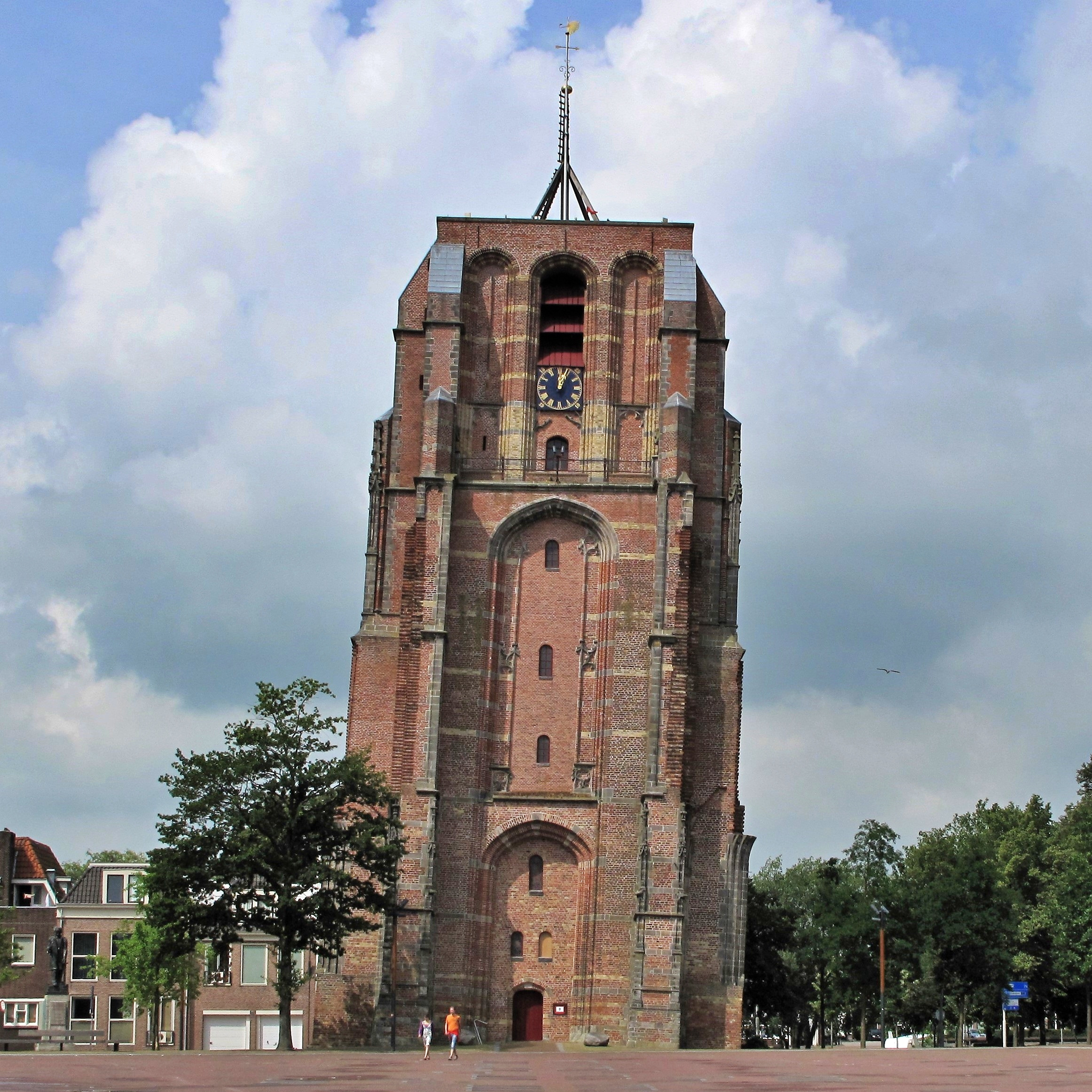
Oldehove

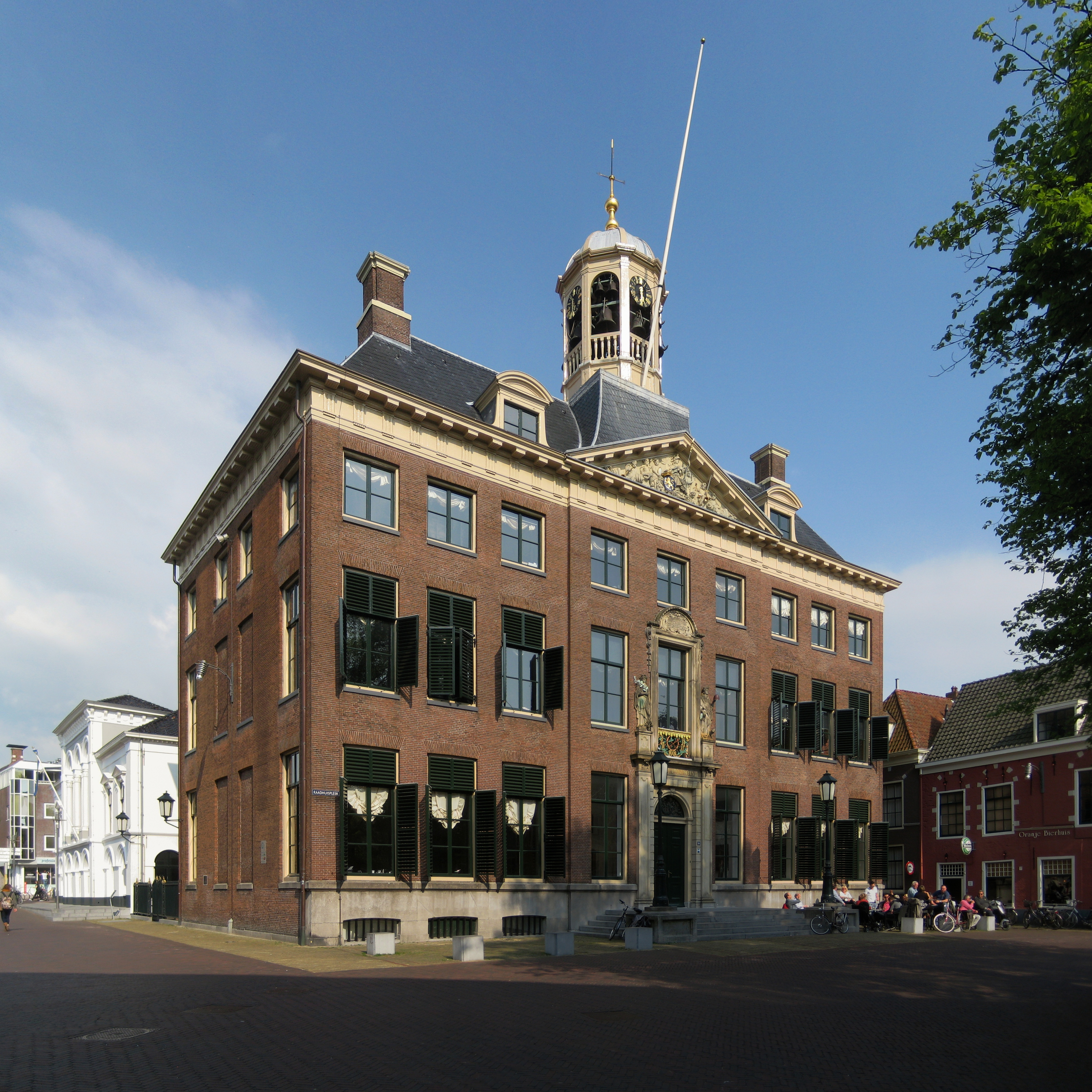
City hall

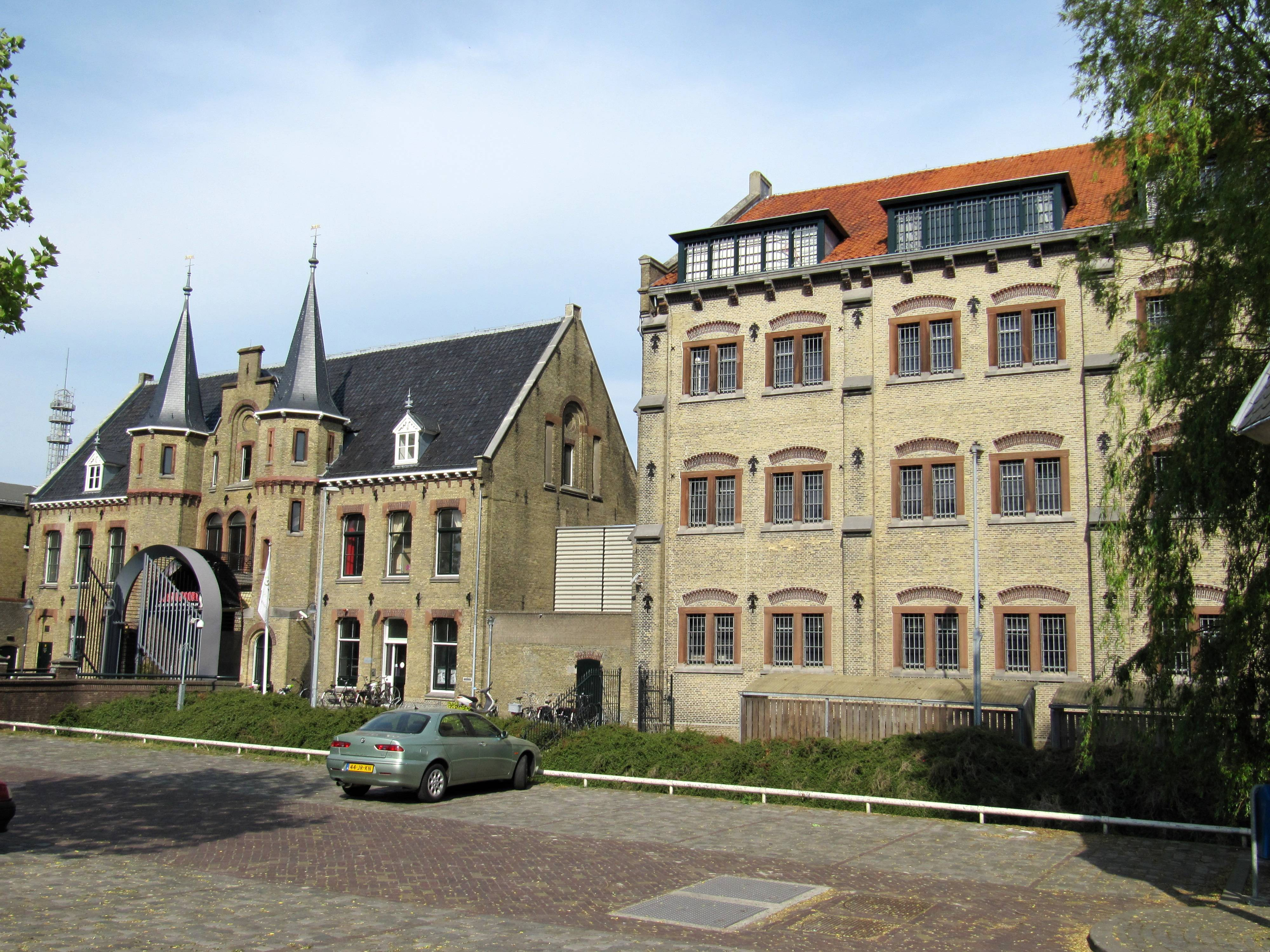
Blokhuispoort

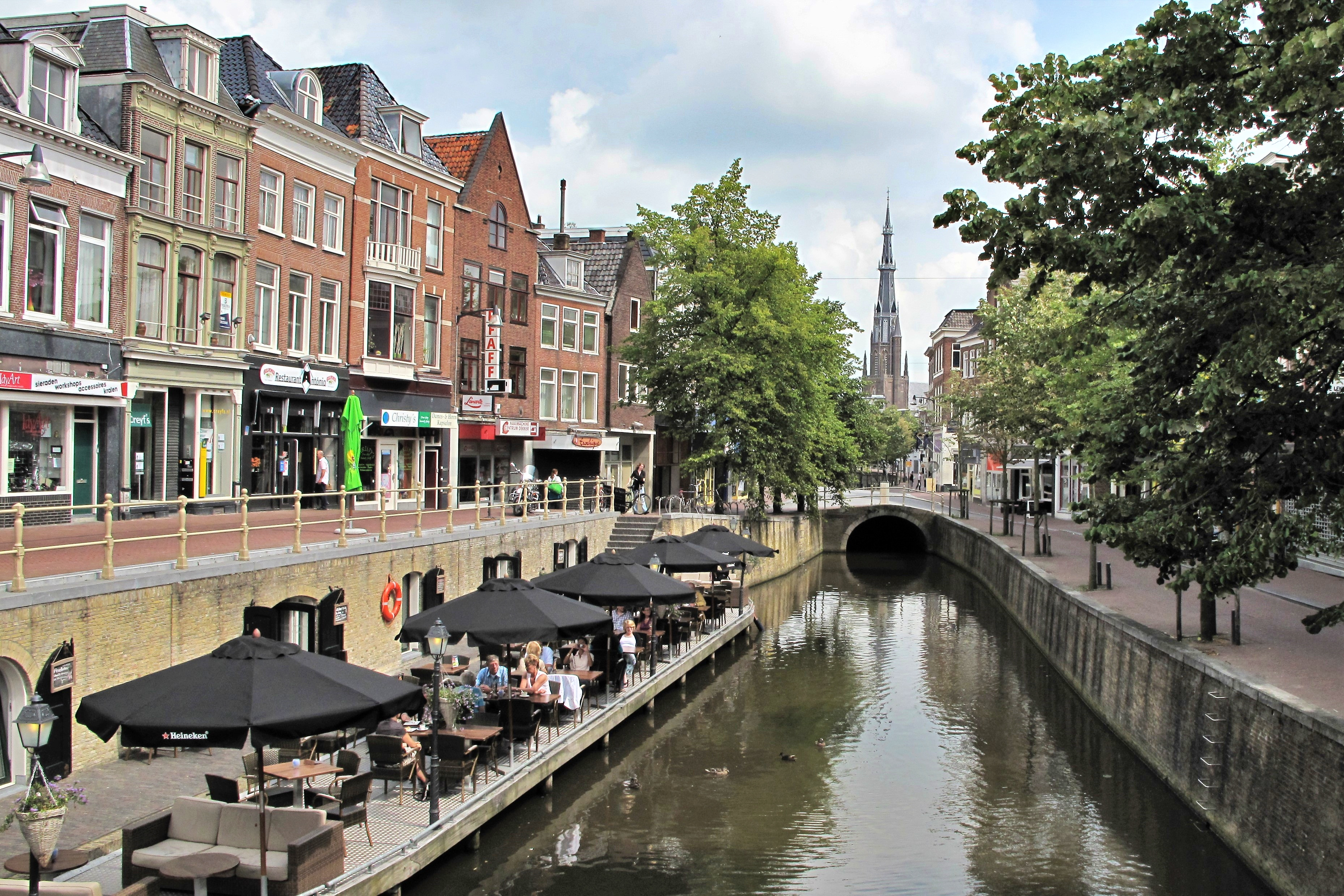
Leeuwarden canal Kelders

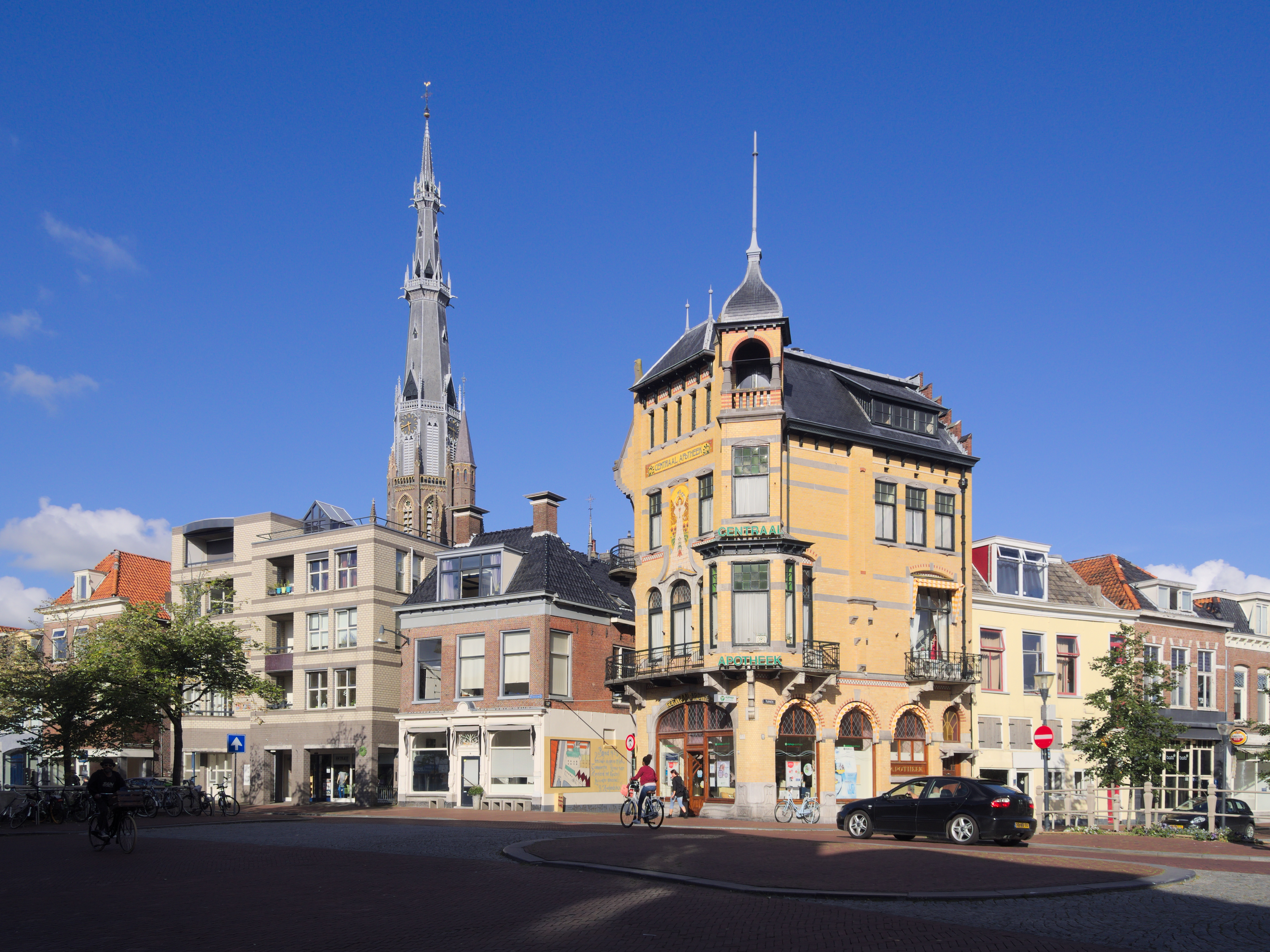
Centraal Apotheek

=== Cultural events and festivals ===
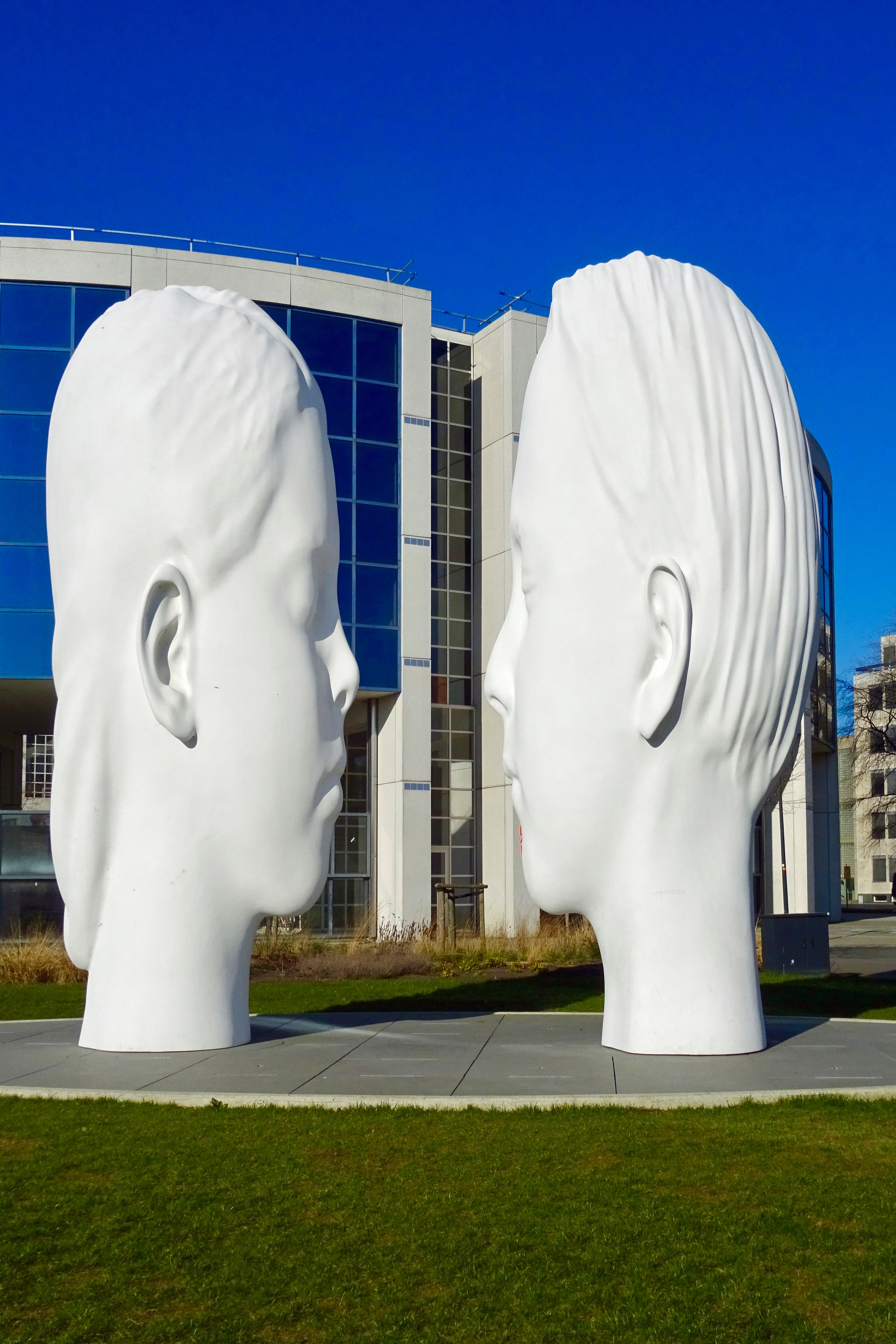
Love Fountain by artist Jaume Plensa

On 6 September 2013 Leeuwarden was voted European Capital of Culture for the year 2018. Many events were organised throughout the year. The largest art project was the 11Fountains, fountains in the Frisian eleven cities. The Love Fountain, located in front of the train station, was designed by artist Jaume Plensa. The fountain is seven metres high and consists of two white heads of a boy and a girl, their eyes closed and dreaming.

Annual music festivals are Cityrock, Dancetour, Welcome To The Village, Into the Grave, Explore the North and Fries straatfestival. Other festivals are Noordelijk Film Festival (an event for film makers), photofestival Noorderlicht and the Media Art festival. Other events are Racing Expo and a large flower market (held on Ascension Day). There is also a weekly cattle market.

== Transport ==
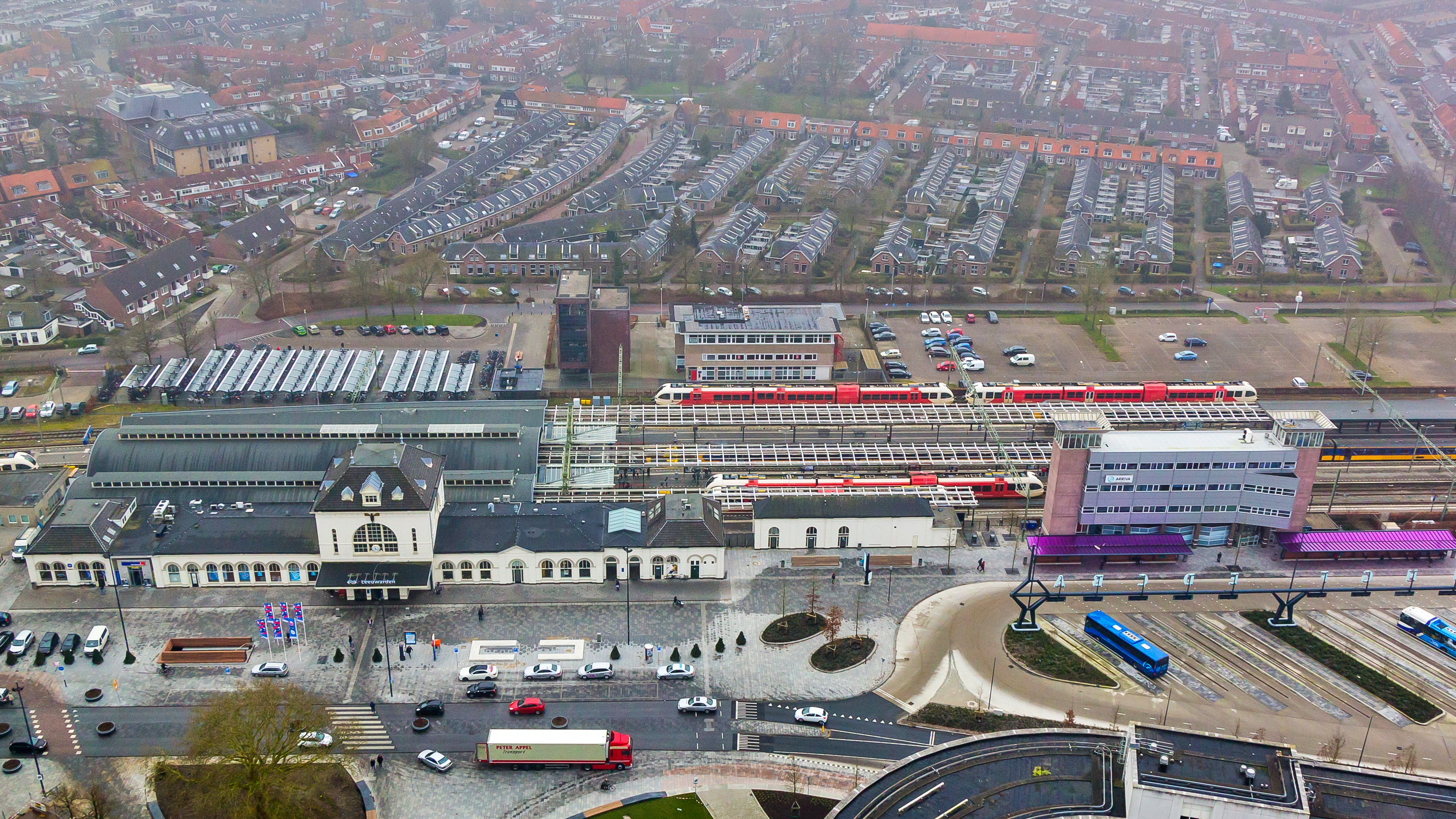
Leeuwarden railway station and bus station in 2018

Leeuwarden railway station (opened on 27 October 1863) is the main railway station of Leeuwarden. It is a terminus station of the NS railway line from Zwolle. Regional trains, served by Arriva, operate to Groningen in the east, Harlingen in the west and Stavoren in the southwest. The other stations in the municipality are Leeuwarden Camminghaburen, and Grou-Jirnsum. A fourth station Leeuwarden Werpsterhoeke was planned to be opened after 2018.

Near the train station is the bus station. Qbuzz runs several city, regional and national buses. Route 66 Leeuwarden-Holwerd connects with the ferry to Ameland, bus route 50 to Lauwersoog connects with the departures of the ferry to Schiermonnikoog and route 350 via the Afsluitdijk connects to Alkmaar in North Holland.

The motorway A31 passes Leeuwarden and the A32 connects Leeuwarden to Meppel. The Van Harinxmakanaal is a major canal and connects Harlingen to Leeuwarden.

== Education ==
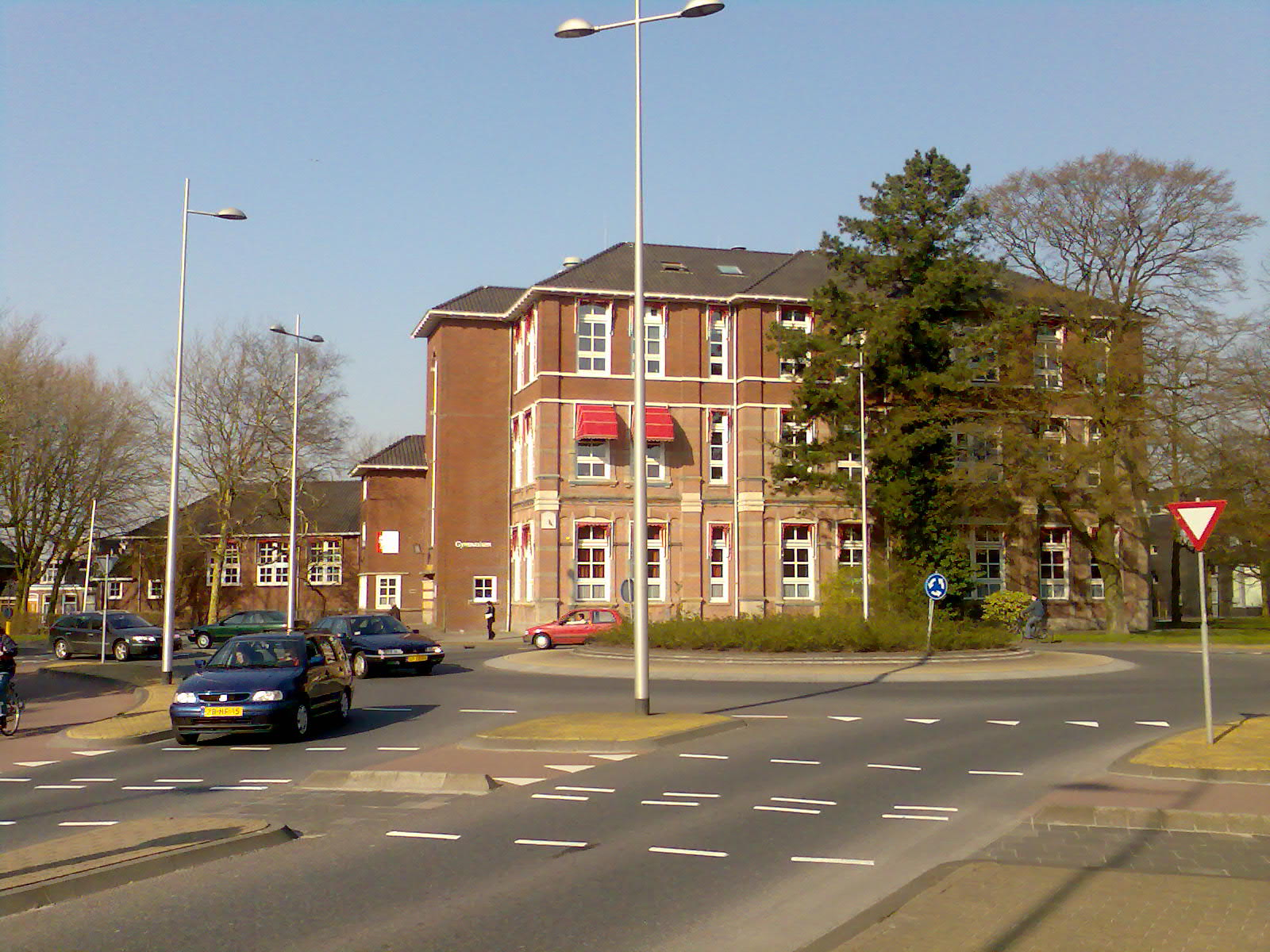
Stedelijk Gymnasium in 2007

Leeuwarden has a number of respected schools of applied science (HBO in Dutch), (21,480 students in 2017), such as the Van Hall Instituut (agricultural and life sciences) and the NHL Stenden University of Applied Sciences (hotel management, economical and media management). In addition to higher education, the city is also home to three regional vocational schools (MBO): the Friese Poort, Friesland College, and Nordwin College.

Although the city has no university of its own, several satellite campuses are located here, including Campus Fryslân (University of Groningen), Dairy Campus (Wageningen University and Research) and the Academie voor Popkultuur (Hanze University of Applied Sciences Groningen)

Technological Top Institute Wetsus does research into water-related technologies. Centre of Expertise Water Technology (CEW) is the knowledge and innovation centre for applied research and product development in the field of water technology and the Wadden Academy to study and research the Wadden Sea.

== Economy ==
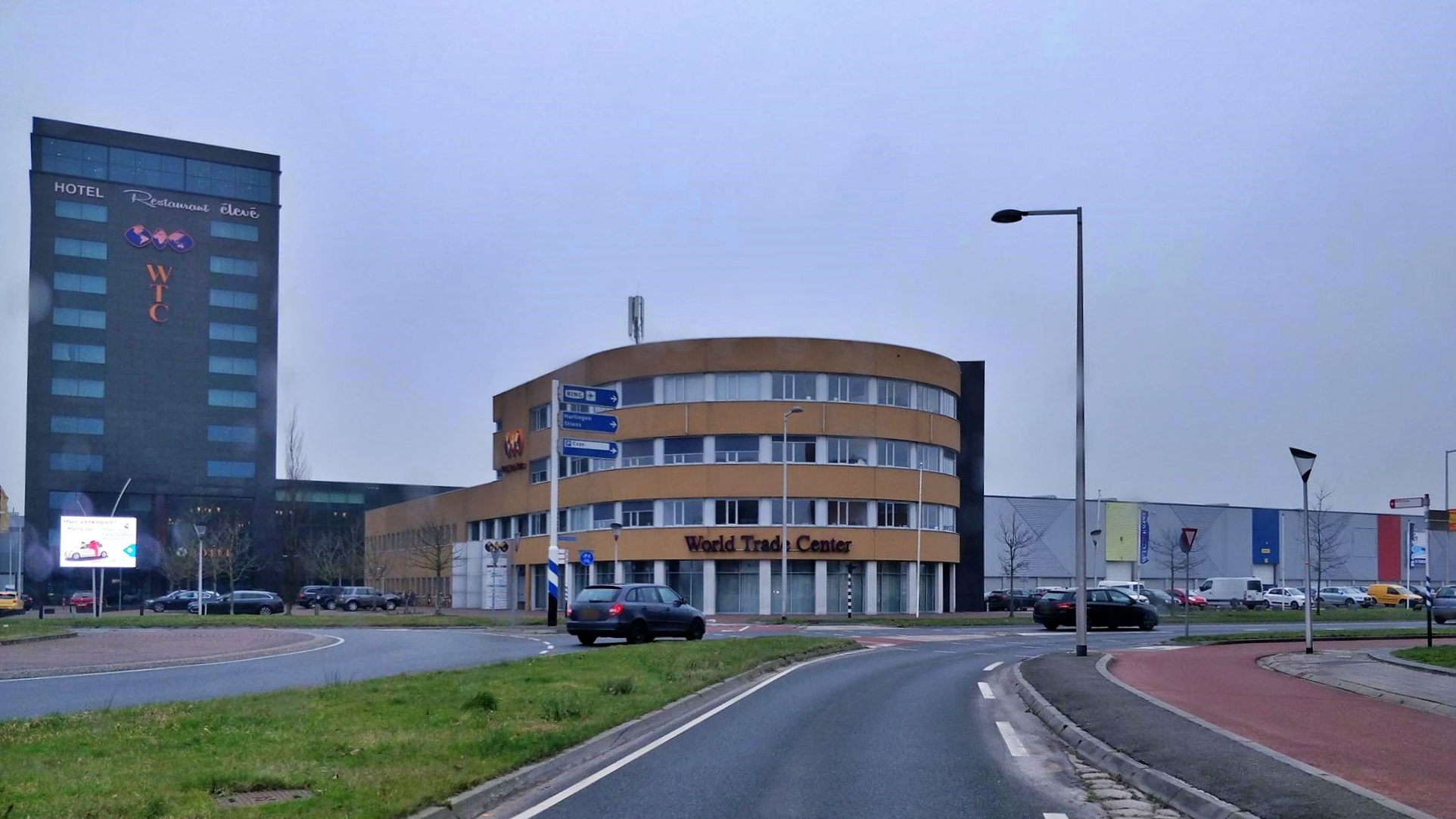
WTC Expo

Among the 10 largest employers in Leeuwarden are Medical Center Leeuwarden (MCL), ING, The Central Judicial Collection Agency (CJIB), Achmea, NHL Stenden University of Applied Sciences, Leeuwarden Air Base and FrieslandCampina. WTC Expo is the largest events complex in the Northern Netherlands.

== Sports ==
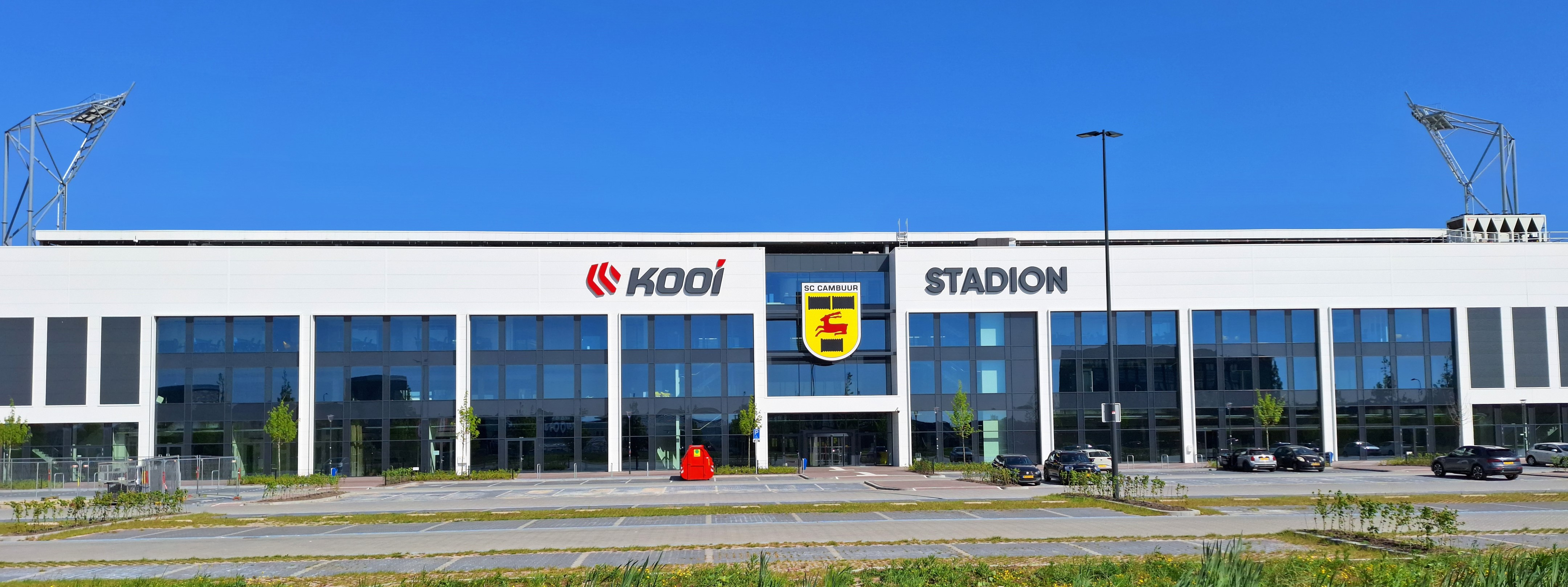
Kooi Stadion

The city's local football team, SC Cambuur, are playing in the second tier Eerste Divisie. Their home ground is the Kooi Stadion, which has a capacity of 15,000. The city's basketball team, Aris Leeuwarden, has played in the Dutch Basketball League since 2004.

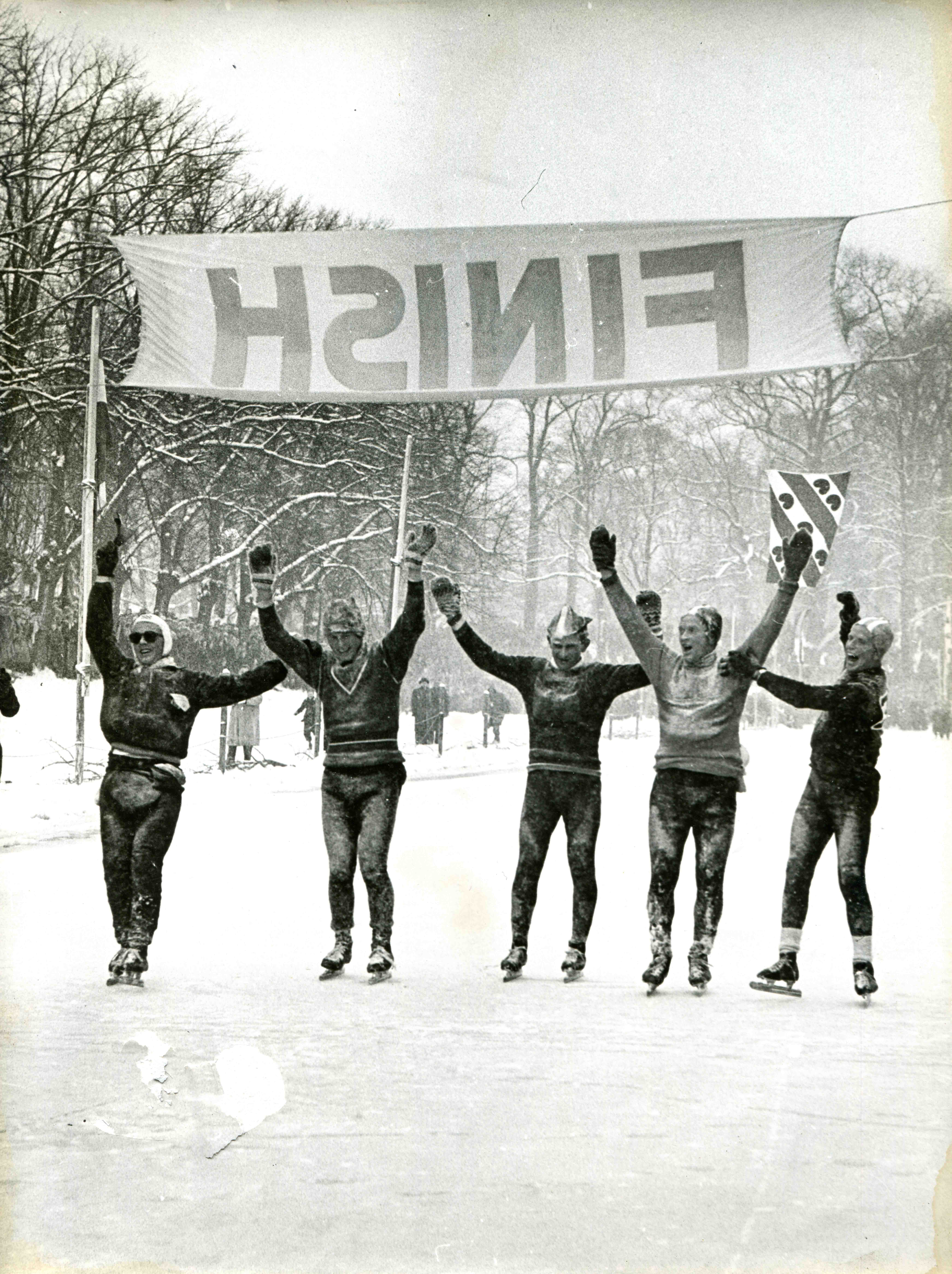
Finish of the Elfstedentocht in 1956

The Elfstedenhal is a sport venue. The stadium is used for long track speed skating, short track speed skating, ice hockey, figure skating and curling. The 400m indoor speed skating oval is named after speed skater Atje Keulen-Deelstra. The ice hockey club is IJshockeyclub Capitals Leeuwarden (IJCCL).

Leeuwarden is the starting and finishing point for the celebrated Elfstedentocht, a 200 km (120 mi) speed skating race over the Frisian waterways that is held when winter conditions in the province allow. As of 2018, it last took place in January 1997, preceded by the races of 1986 and 1985. In 1986, the Dutch king Willem-Alexander participated in the Eleven cities tour, with the pseudonym W.A. van Buren, which is the pseudonym of the royal family of the Netherlands.

Loop Leeuwarden is an annual road running competition (5 km, 10 km and half marathon races). The race was first held in 1985 and takes place in May. It attracts amateur runners. The city of Leeuwarden has two sailing boats (skûtsje) racing in the yearly sailing competition Skûtsjesilen.

Leeuwarden was to be the host of the World Flying Disc Federation 2020 World Ultimate and Guts Championships from the 11th to the 18th of July. The event was expected to have over 2500 athletes from 40 countries. The event was cancelled (COVID-19 pandemic).

== Media ==
The Leeuwarder Courant and Friesch Dagblad are daily newspapers mainly written in Dutch (published by the NDC Mediagroep). Omrop Fryslân is a public broadcaster with radio and TV programs mainly in Frisian.

== Notable residents ==
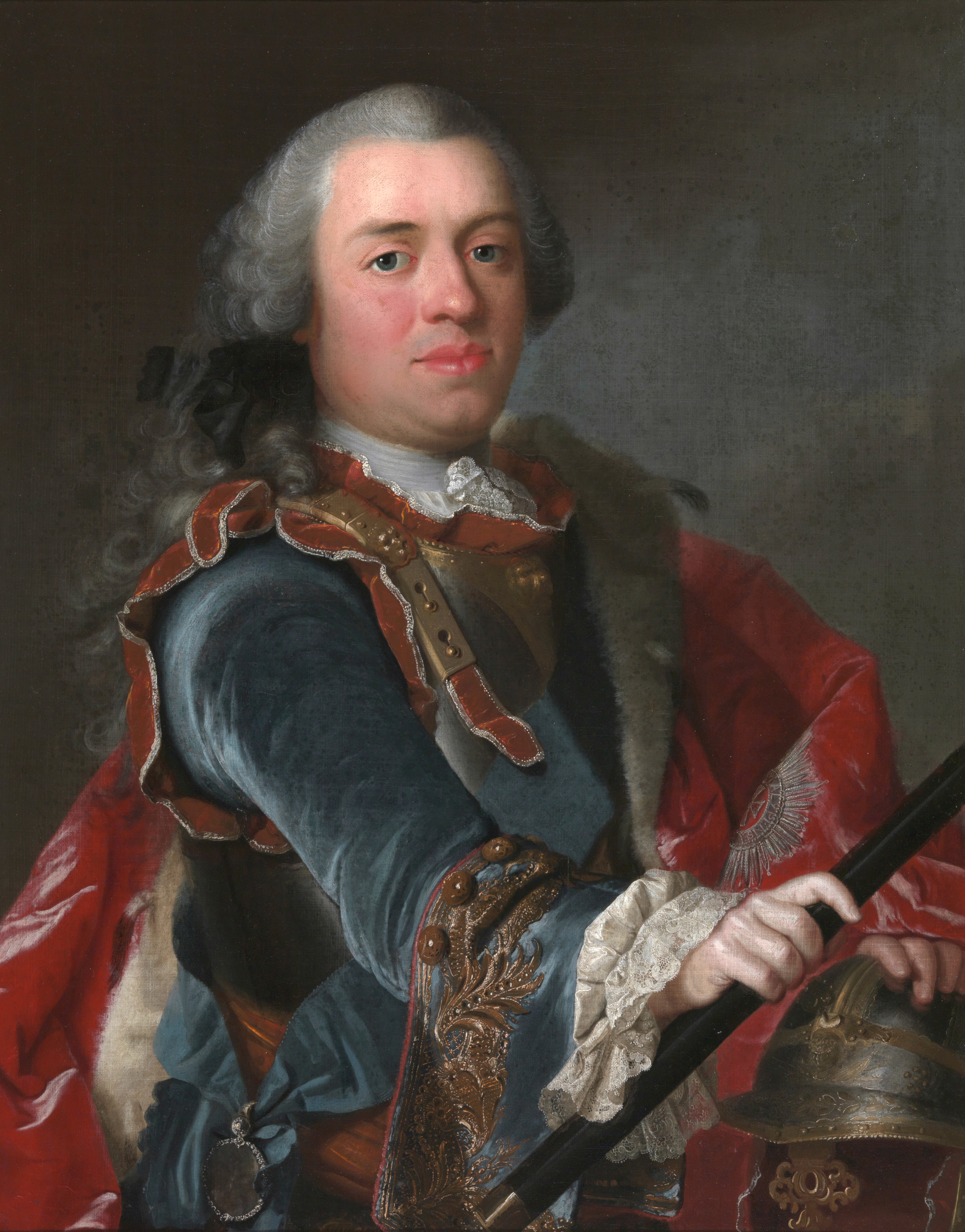
William IV, Prince of Orange, 1751

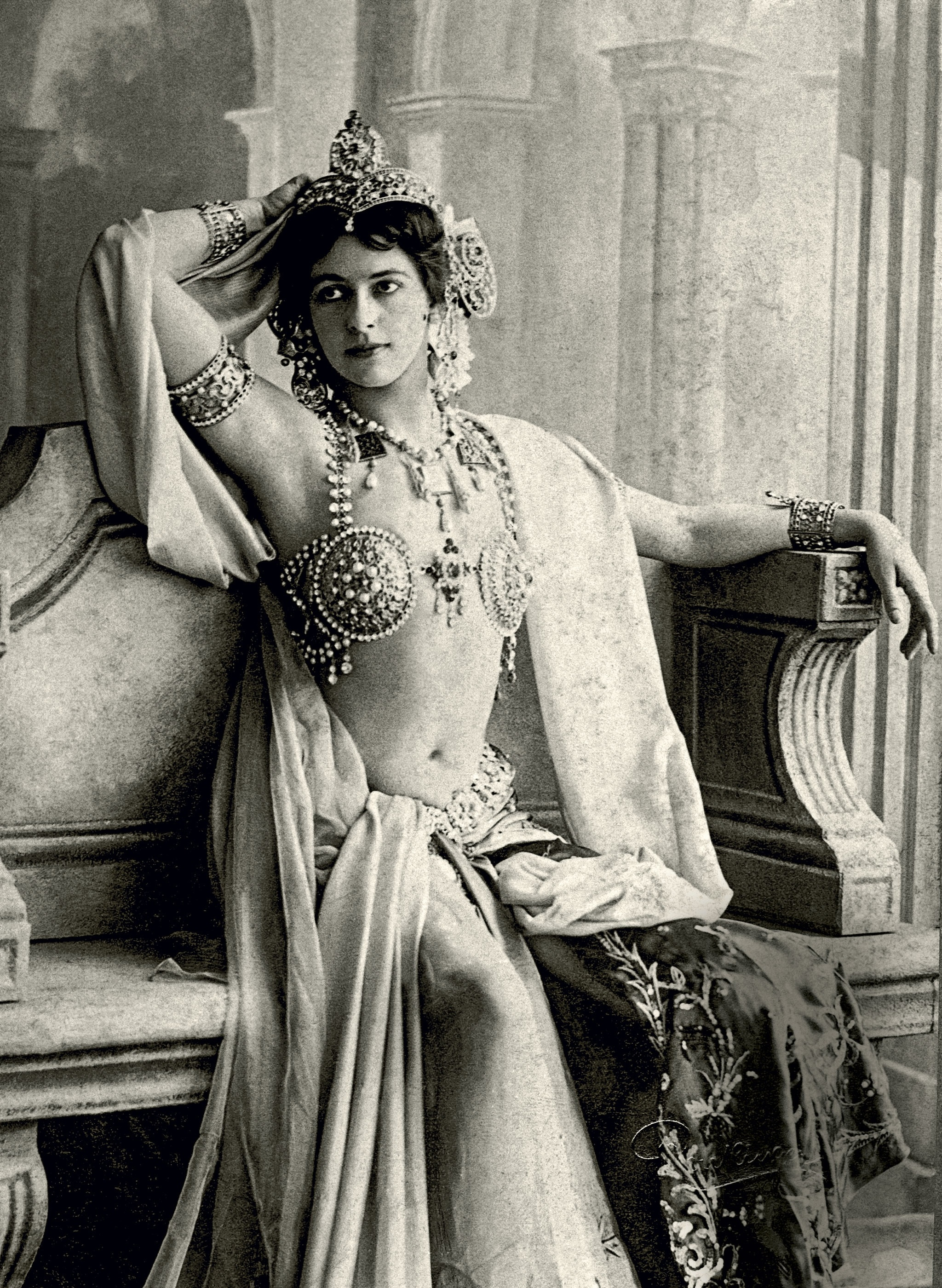
Mata Hari, 1906

- Lawrence Alma-Tadema (1836–1912), knighted painter
- Eva and Abraham Beem (1932/1934–1944), young Jewish Holocaust victims
- Cornelis Botke (1887–1954), painter and etcher
- Cisca Dresselhuys (born 1943), journalist and magazine editor
- Esmée van Eeghen (1918–1944), resistance fighter in World War II
- Dirk van Erp (1860–1933), artisan and metalsmith
- M. C. Escher (1898–1972), graphic artist
- Richard Hageman (1881–1966), conductor, pianist, composer, and actor
- Willem van Haren (1710–1768), poet
- Havank (1904–1964), writer, journalist, and translator
- Wilhelmina van Idsinga (1788–1819), painter
- Johannes Henricus Gerardus Jansen (1868–1936), archbishop
- Wijerd Jelckama (c. 1490–1523), military commander
- Mata Hari (1876–1917), exotic dancer and courtesan, possible double agent
- Hendrik Niehoff (1495–c. 1561), pipe organ maker
- Piet Paaltjens (1835–1894), minister and romantic author
- Joachim van Plettenberg (1739–1793), colonial governor
- Tjitske Reidinga (born 1972), actress
- Jan Jacob Slauerhoff (1898–1936), poet and novelist
- Abraham Lambertsz van den Tempel (1622–1672), painter
- Pieter Jelles Troelstra (1860–1930), politician
- Cornelis Adriaan Lobry van Troostenburg de Bruyn (1857–1904), chemist
- Saskia van Uylenburg (1612–1642), wife of the painter Rembrandt van Rijn
- Lodewijk Caspar Valckenaer (1715–1785), classical scholar
- Rinskje Visscher (1868–1950), first female municipal archivist in the Netherlands
- Campegius Vitringa (1659–1722), theologian
- Hans Vredeman de Vries (1527–c. 1607), architect, painter, and engineer
- Harm Wiersma (born 1953), draughts player and politician
- William IV, Prince of Orange (1711–1751), stadtholder
- Joost Klein (born 1997), rapper/singer and Participant of the Eurovision Song Contest 2024

== Politics ==
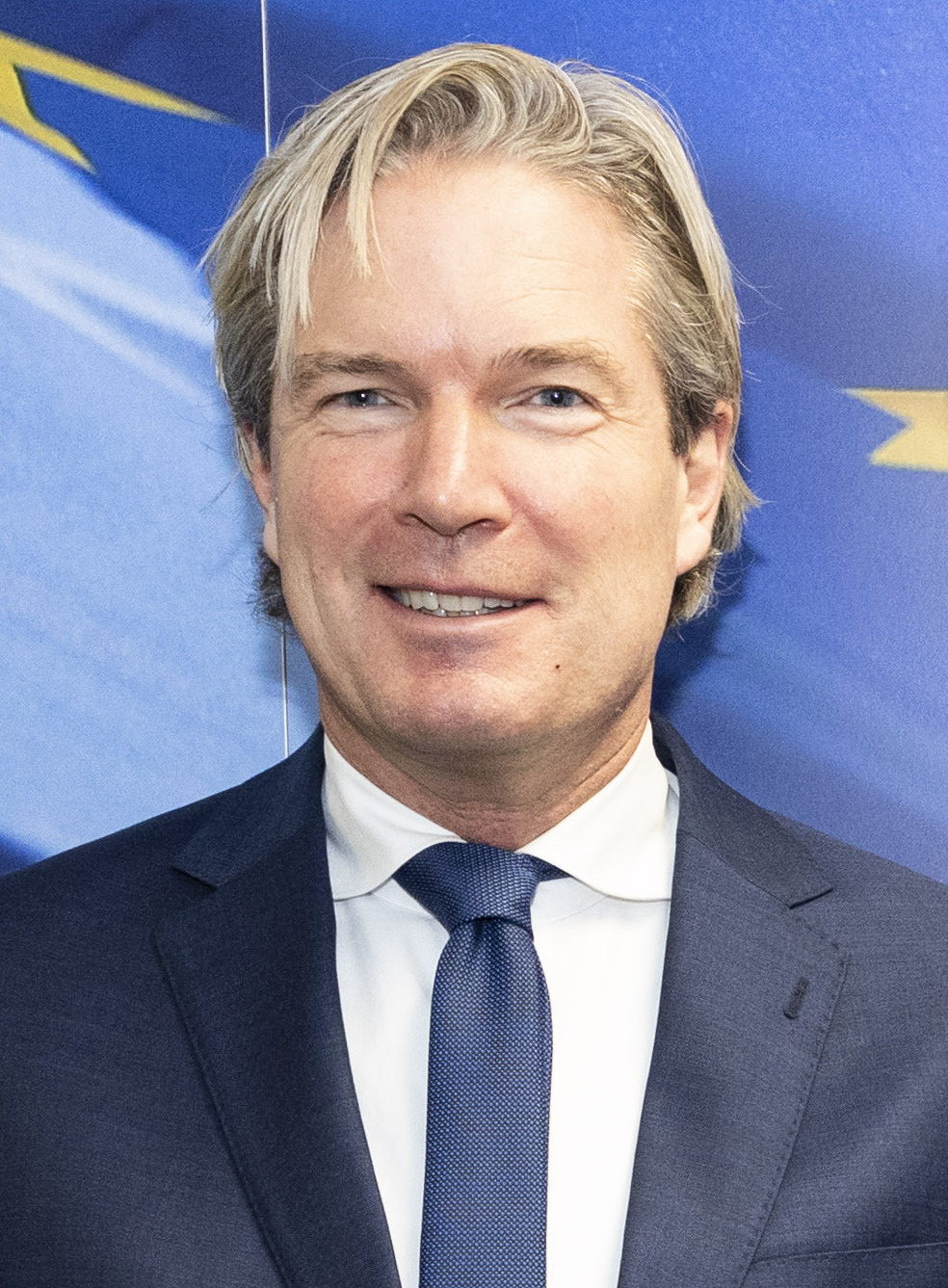
Mayor Foort van Oosten in 2025

In the Netherlands, a municipality is governed by the college of mayor and aldermen and the municipal council. Foort van Oosten of the VVD has been interim mayor of Leeuwarden since 1 July 2026. Since the 2014 municipal elections, the Labour Party (3 aldermen), Christian Democratic Appeal (2 aldermen), PAL GroenLinks (1 alderman) form a coalition. The municipal council of Leeuwarden has 39 seats.

As provincial capital, Leeuwarden is also the seat of the King's Commissioner Arno Brok and the Provincial Council of Friesland.

== International relations ==
The city of Leeuwarden is twinned with

Liyang, China (since 2011)	Oryol, Russia (1990-2002)
