= Teerns =

Teerns Tearns
- Hamlet
- Coat of arms

- Location in the Netherlands Teerns (Netherlands)
- Country: Netherlands
- Province: Friesland
- Municipality: Leeuwarden

Area
  - Total: 0.20 km^{2} (0.077 sq mi)
- Elevation: 0.2 m (0.66 ft)

Population (2021)
  - Total: 150
  - Density: 750/km^{2} (1,900/sq mi)
- Time zone: UTC+1 (CET)
  - Summer (DST): UTC+2 (CEST)
- Postal code: 9085
- Dialing code: 058

Teerns (West Frisian: Tearns) is a hamlet in Leeuwarden municipality in the province of Friesland, the Netherlands. It had a population of around 17 in 2005. The hamlet is often referred as Hempens-Teerns, because it forms a twin settlement with Hempens.

== History ==
The hamlet was first mentioned in 1397 as "to Terynse". The etymology is unclear. Teerns was originally a terp (artificial living mound) village. The church and tower had existed as early as 1718. The church was demolished in 18th century probably around 1735, and the bell tower was removed in 1878. In 1840, Teerns was home to 40 people. In 1872, the terp was excavated, and the former centre has disappeared at the construction of the A31 motorway. Nowadays Teerns consists of about 9 houses.
