= Snakkerburen =

Snakkerburen Snakkerbuorren
- Village
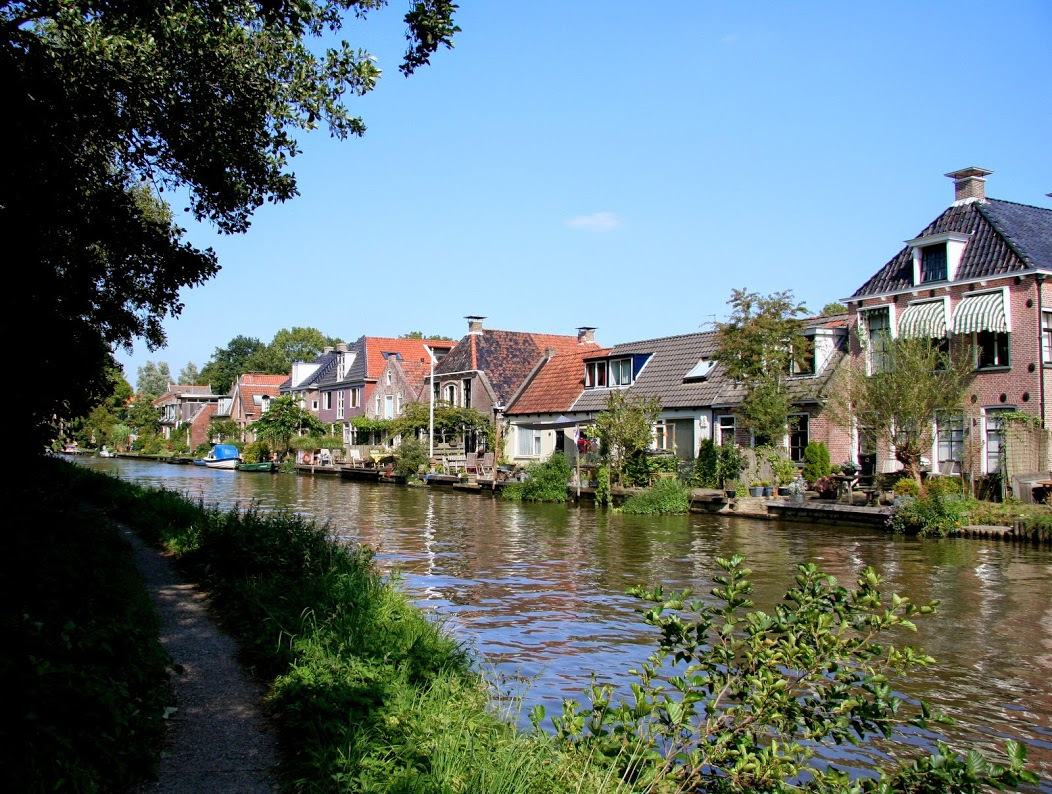
- View from the Dokkumer Trekweg

- Location in the Netherlands Snakkerburen (Netherlands)
- Country: Netherlands
- Province: Friesland
- Municipality: Leeuwarden

Area
  - Total: 0.31 km^{2} (0.12 sq mi)
- Elevation: 0.6 m (2.0 ft)

Population (2021)
  - Total: 195
  - Density: 630/km^{2} (1,600/sq mi)
- Time zone: UTC+1 (CET)
  - Summer (DST): UTC+2 (CEST)
- Postal code: 9083
- Dialing code: 058

Snakkerburen (West Frisian: Snakkerbuorren) is a village in Leeuwarden municipality in the province of Friesland, the Netherlands. It had a population of around 225 in January 2017.

== History ==
The village was first mentioned in 1664 as Snackerbuyren. The etymology is unknown.

Snakkerburen was originally an agriculture community. During the 15th century, some shopkeepers from Leeuwarden moved in, because it was outside the jurisdiction of the city. In the 17th century, brickworks and kiln were established along the canalised Dokkumer Ee. In 1840, Snakkerburen was home to 287 people.

== Gallery ==
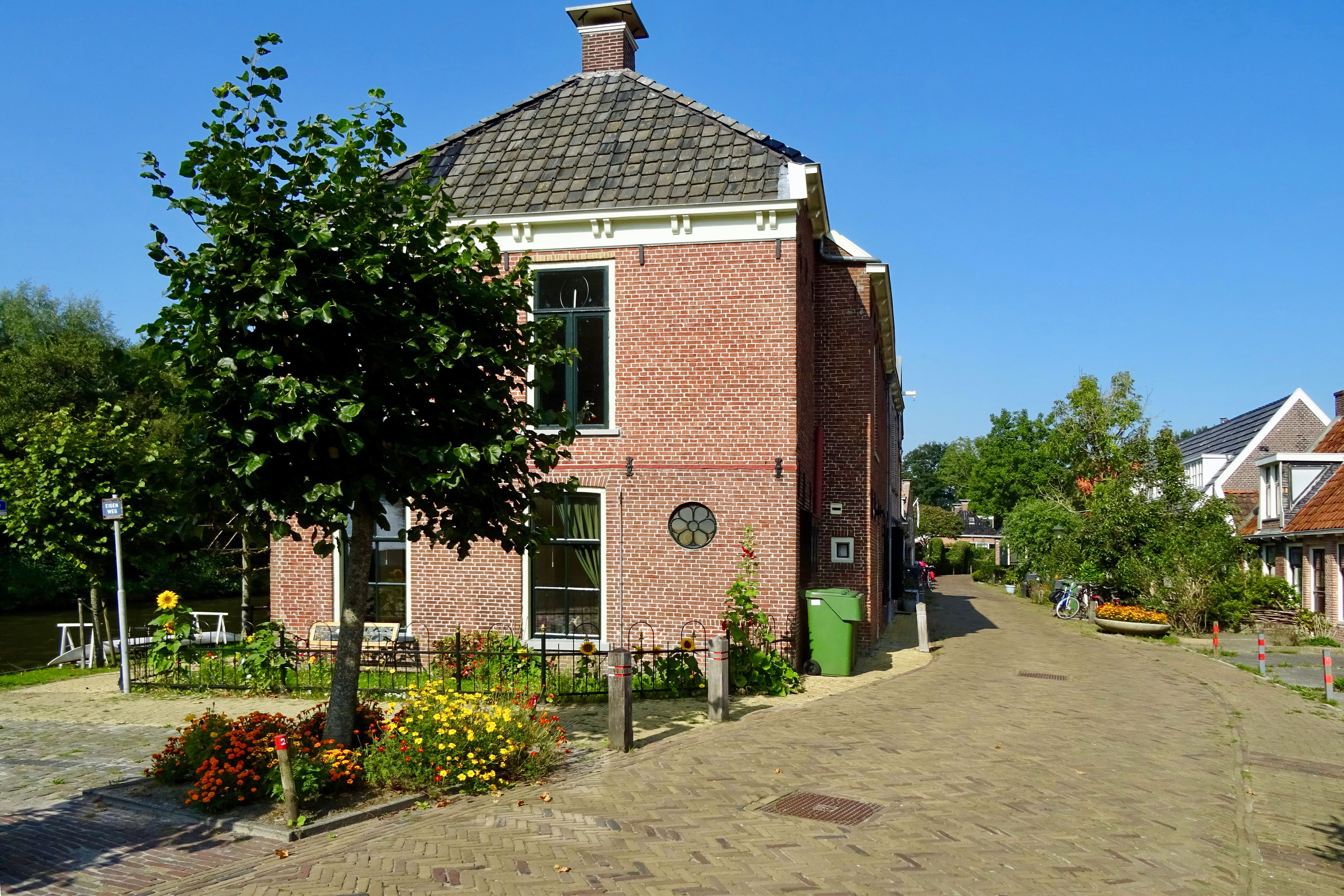
Former Inn de Sevenster

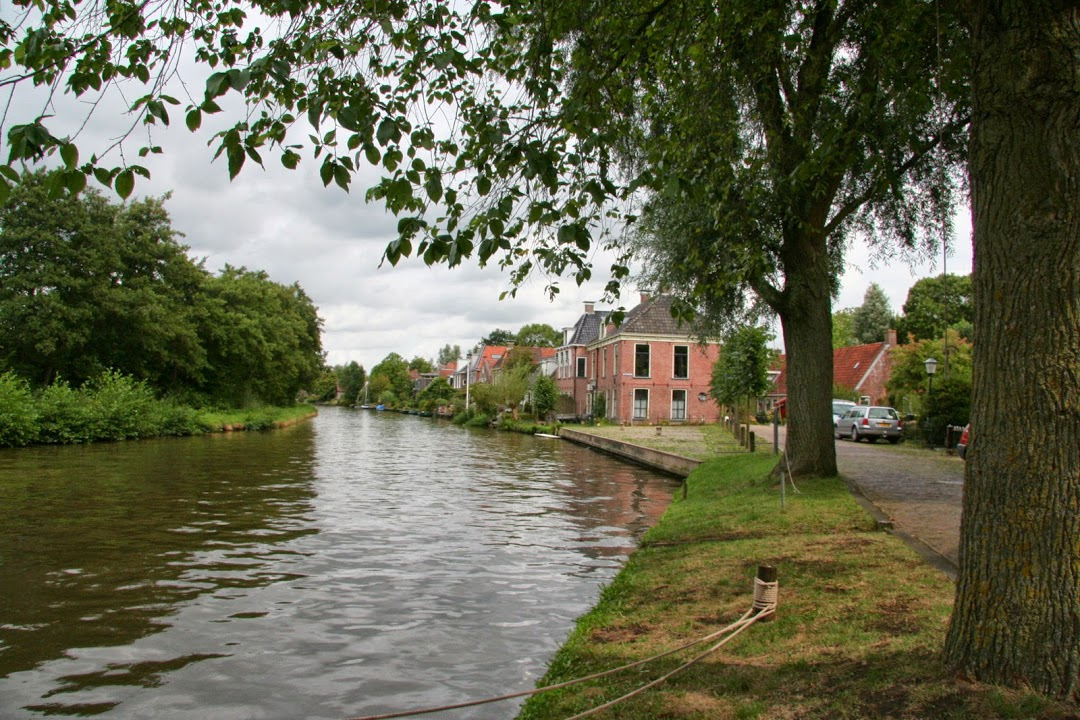
Canal view

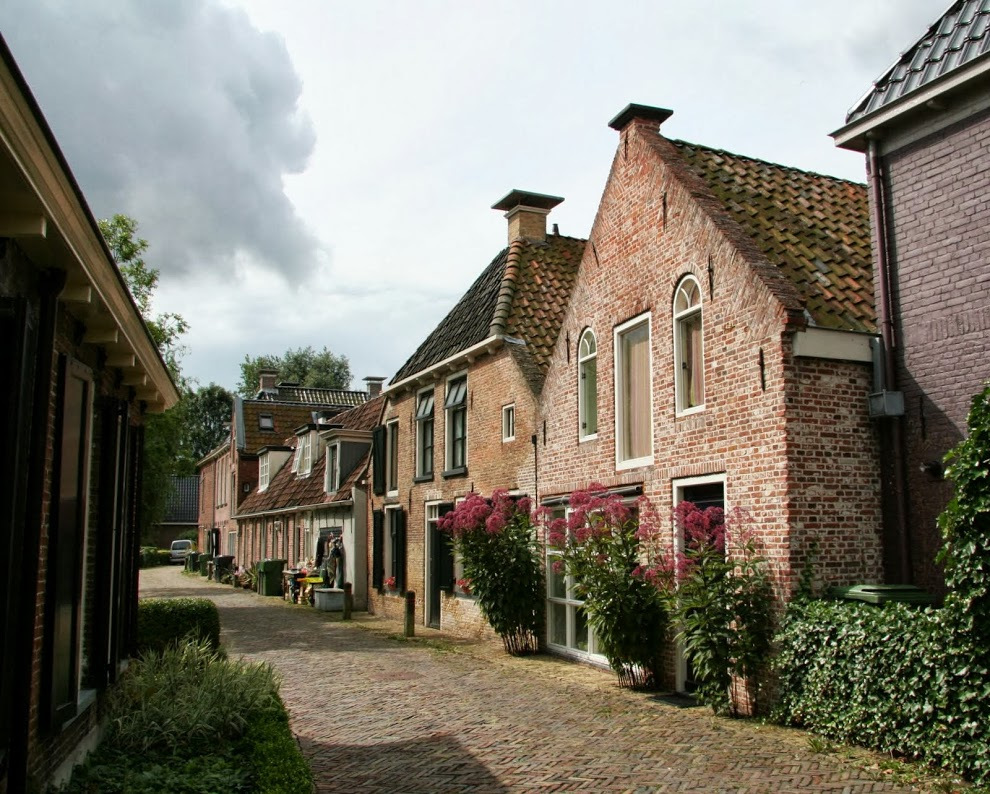
Street view

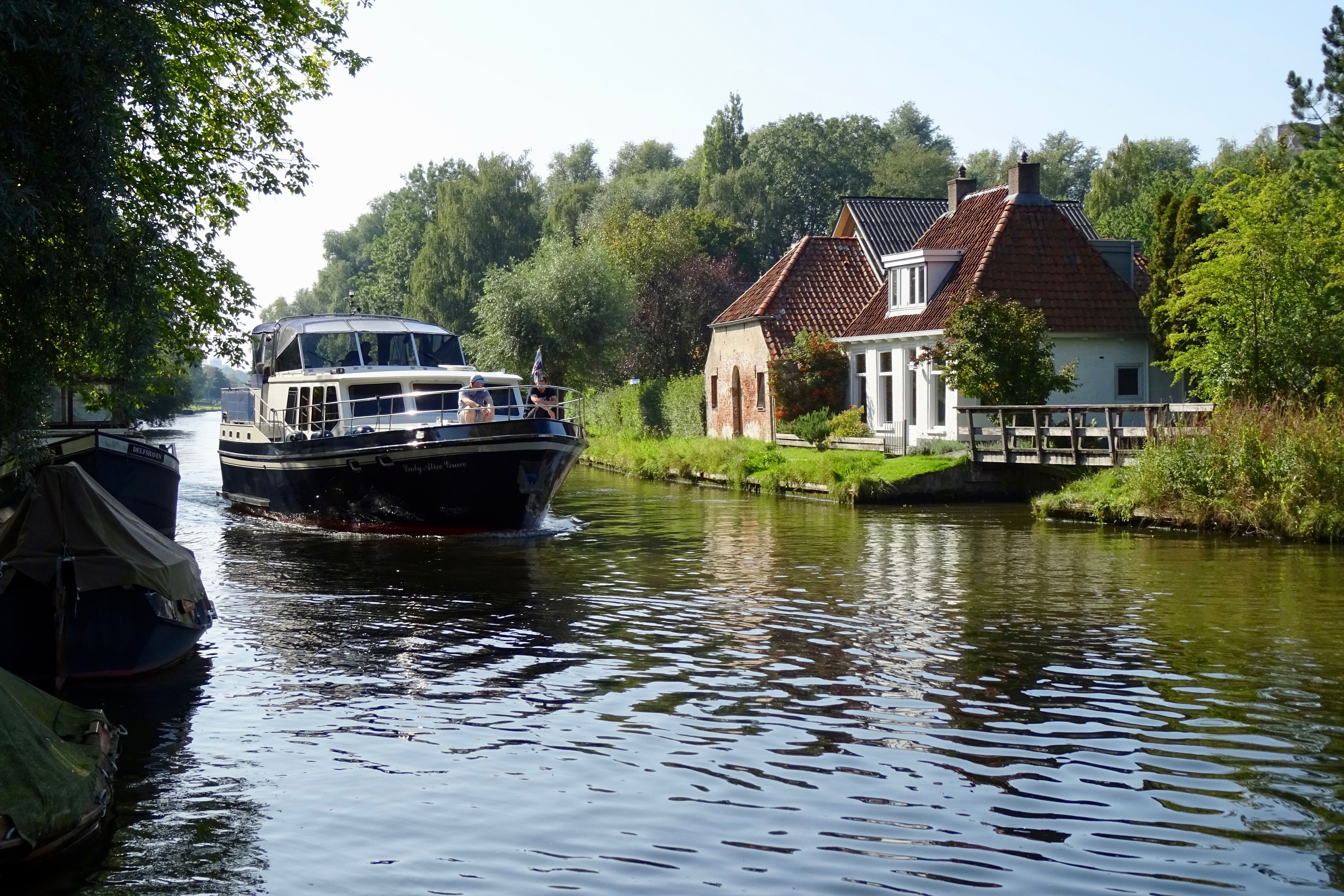
Canal view
