= Wetsus =

Dutch water technology research centre

Coordinates: 53.1963°N 5.8038°E

Wetsus - European Centre of Excellence for Sustainable Water Technology is a research centre for water technology in Leeuwarden, the Netherlands. Over one hundred companies and twenty knowledge institutes work together at Wetsus to develop solutions for global water issues.

== History ==
Wetsus was established as part of Samenwerkingsverband Noord-Nederland (a public-private partnership in the northern Netherlands, covering Friesland, Groningen and Drenthe), the Frisian Water Alliance, the University of Twente, the University of Groningen and Wageningen University & Research to strengthen the position of the region as major player in the water sector. In 2007 the institute was labeled Top Technological Institute.

== Collaboration ==
Together with other actors of the WaterCampus Leeuwarden, Wetsus collaborates with several initiatives, such as:

- the Water Alliance to take technological innovations to the market,
- the Centrum voor innovatief vakmanschap water (Centre for innovative craftmanship water) for vocational education;
- the Centre of Expertise Water Technology (CEW) for collaboration in the applied sciences.

Wetsus is home to the MSc Water Technology, a joint degree of the University of Groningen, the University of Twente and Wageningen University & Research.

== Innovation & research ==
Wetsus studied reverse electrodialysis to generate osmotic power. That research resulted in a spin-off company called REDstack that generates blue energy at the Afsluitdijk in the Netherlands. Wetsus also promoted decentralized sanitation and wastewater reuse in the Netherlands through the spin-off company DeSaH.

As of 2024, research is focused on removing PFAS from water, and the removal of micro and nanoplastics from water.
