= Technological Top Institute =

Dutch research institute

A Technological Top Institute (TTI) (Dutch: Technologisch topinstituut) is a special type of research institute at a Dutch research university. A TTI carries out scientific research in areas that:

1. have been designated to be of key importance to the Netherlands by the Dutch government; and that
2. is subject to such industry interest that it can be funded by public–private partnership agreements.

The concept of the TTI was first developed in 1997, when the Ministry of Economic Affairs was empowered by the Dutch government to identify key areas of national, economic interest and set up funding programs to stimulate those areas, improve Dutch knowledge of them and establish and/or maintain a leading, international position in them. Knowledge valorisation is also a leading goal of the concept.

The research themes of each TTI are selected in a cooperative effort of Dutch industry and the government management organization. That organization was originally SenterNovem, but the responsibility is being transferred to Agentschap.NL (as is all of SenterNovem).

As of 2010 there are nine active TTIs:

Novay Networked Innovation
Novay does research and public-private joint product development in information technology and communication technology. Novay is hosted by the Delft University of Technology.
Dutch Polymer Institute
The Dutch Polymer Institute (DPI) does research into polymer materials. Its mission is to form a leading research institute within Europe for pre-competitive polymer materials research for use by Dutch industry. DPI is hosted by the Eindhoven University of Technology.

A recent example of research at DPI is a joint project announced in September 2010 with the TU/e and the University of Maastricht medical department to investigate the use of biodegradable polymers in healing nerve damage.

Materials innovation institute (M2i)

The Materials innovation institute (M2i) does research into high-tech materials (but not polymer based). M2i is hosted by the Delft University of Technology.

Top Institute Food and Nutrition
The Top Institute Food & Nutrition does research into food and food technology, food safety and nutrition. TIFN is hosted by the Wageningen University and Research Centre.
Top Instituut Pharma (TI Pharma)
TI Pharma enables pre-competitive collaborative research into pharmaceutical (i.e. medicine) development by actively managing public-private partnerships.
Center for Translational Molecular Medicine (CTMM)
The Center for Translational Molecular Medicine does research into medical technologies in the area of personalized treatments, such as medicine delivery technologies and cancer therapies. CTMM is located on the High Tech Campus Eindhoven.
TTI Groene Genetica
TI Groene Genetica does research into cultivation and related technologies, including genetically modified species. TIGG is hosted by the Wageningen University and Research Centre.
Wetsus
Wetsus does research into water management and related technologies. Wetsus is fully cross-institutional and is not based at a university.
Topinstituut BioMedical Materials
BioMedical Materials does research into biomedical materials and medical applications. BMM is fully cross-institutional and is not based at a university.
