= Hempens =

Hempens Himpens
- Village
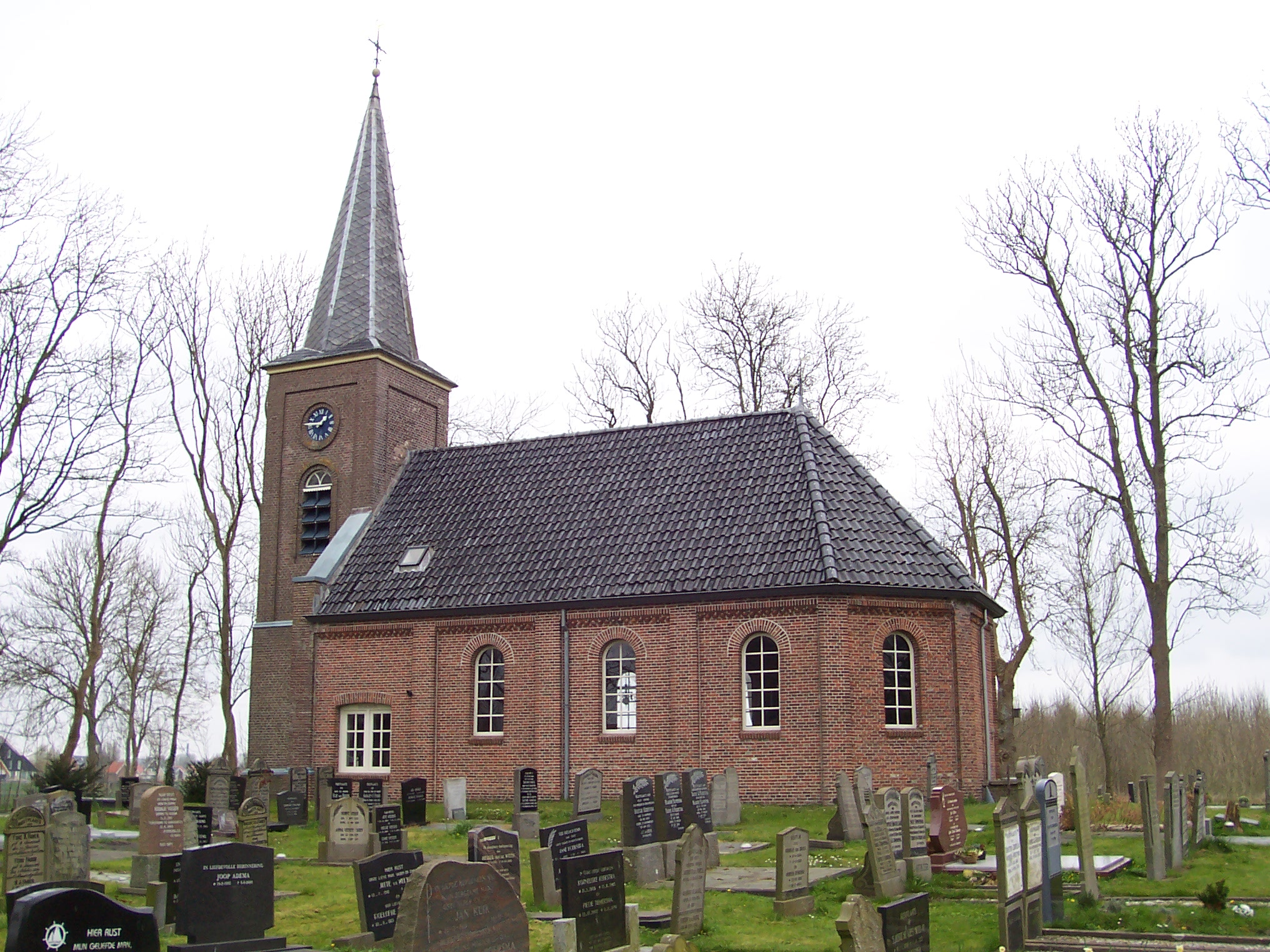
- St Martin's Church

- Flag Coat of arms

- Location in the Netherlands Hempens (Netherlands)
- Country: Netherlands
- Province: Friesland
- Municipality: Leeuwarden

Area
  - Total: 0.93 km^{2} (0.36 sq mi)
- Elevation: 0 m (0 ft)

Population (2021)
  - Total: 285
  - Density: 310/km^{2} (790/sq mi)
- Time zone: UTC+1 (CET)
  - Summer (DST): UTC+2 (CEST)
- Postal code: 9086
- Dialing code: 058

Hempens (West Frisian: Himpens) is a village in Leeuwarden municipality in the province of Friesland, the Netherlands.

It was first mentioned in 1463 as Hempens, and means "settlement of the people of Hempe (person)".

Hempens was an agricultural community. In 1840, it was home to 89 people. The church burnt down in 1945, and was rebuilt in 1948.

== Gallery ==
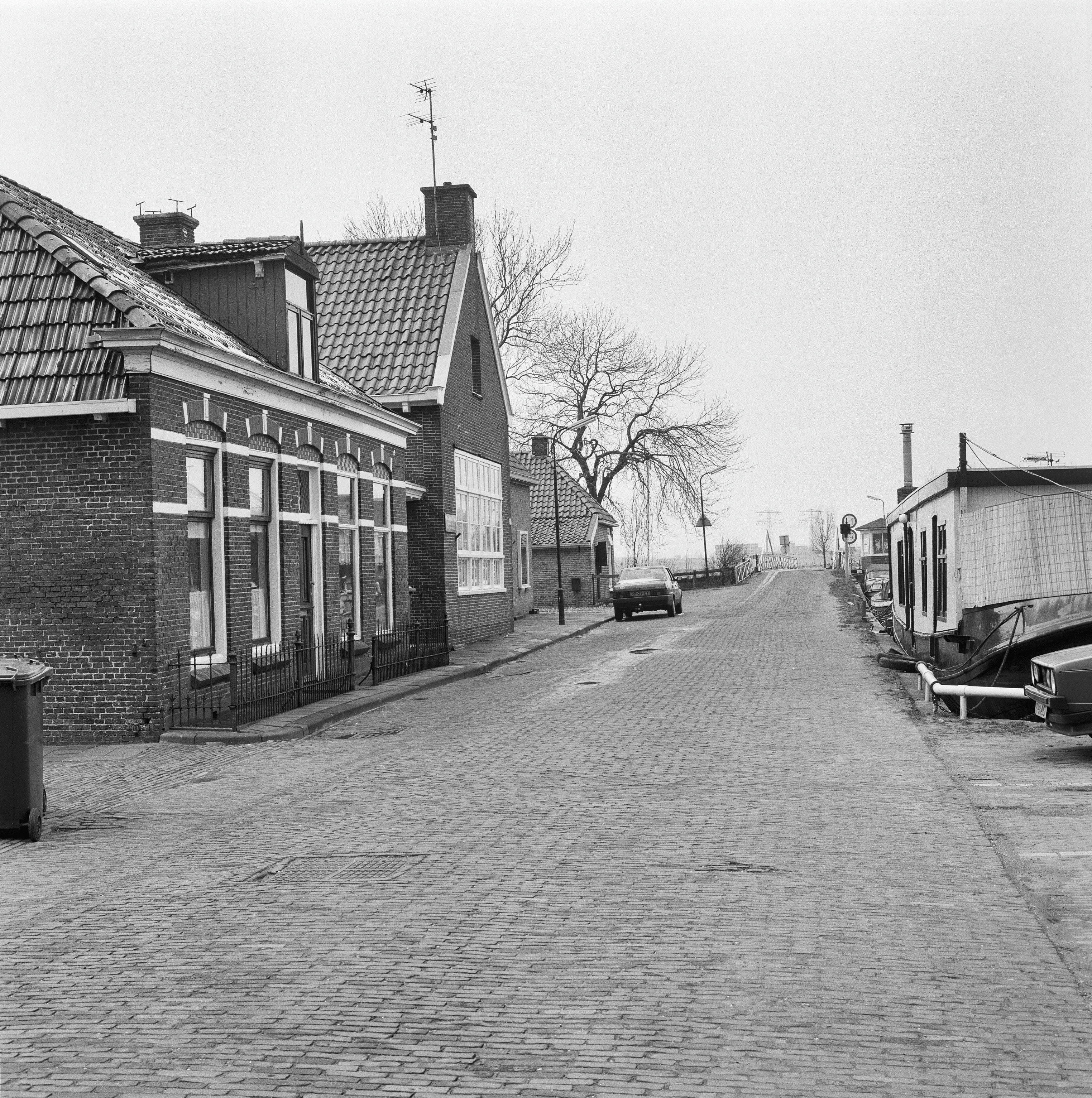
Street view with bridge in the distance

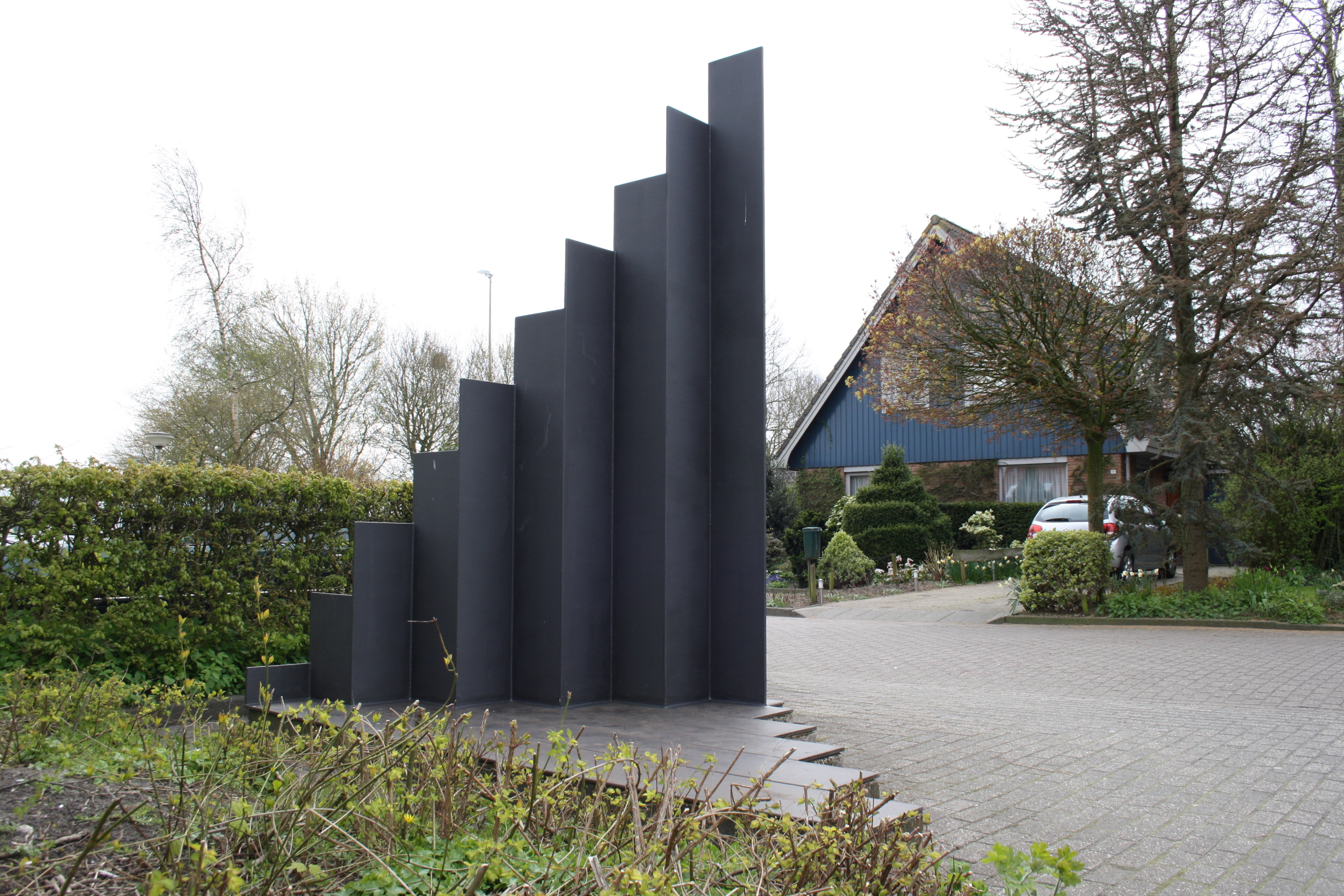
Art in Hempens

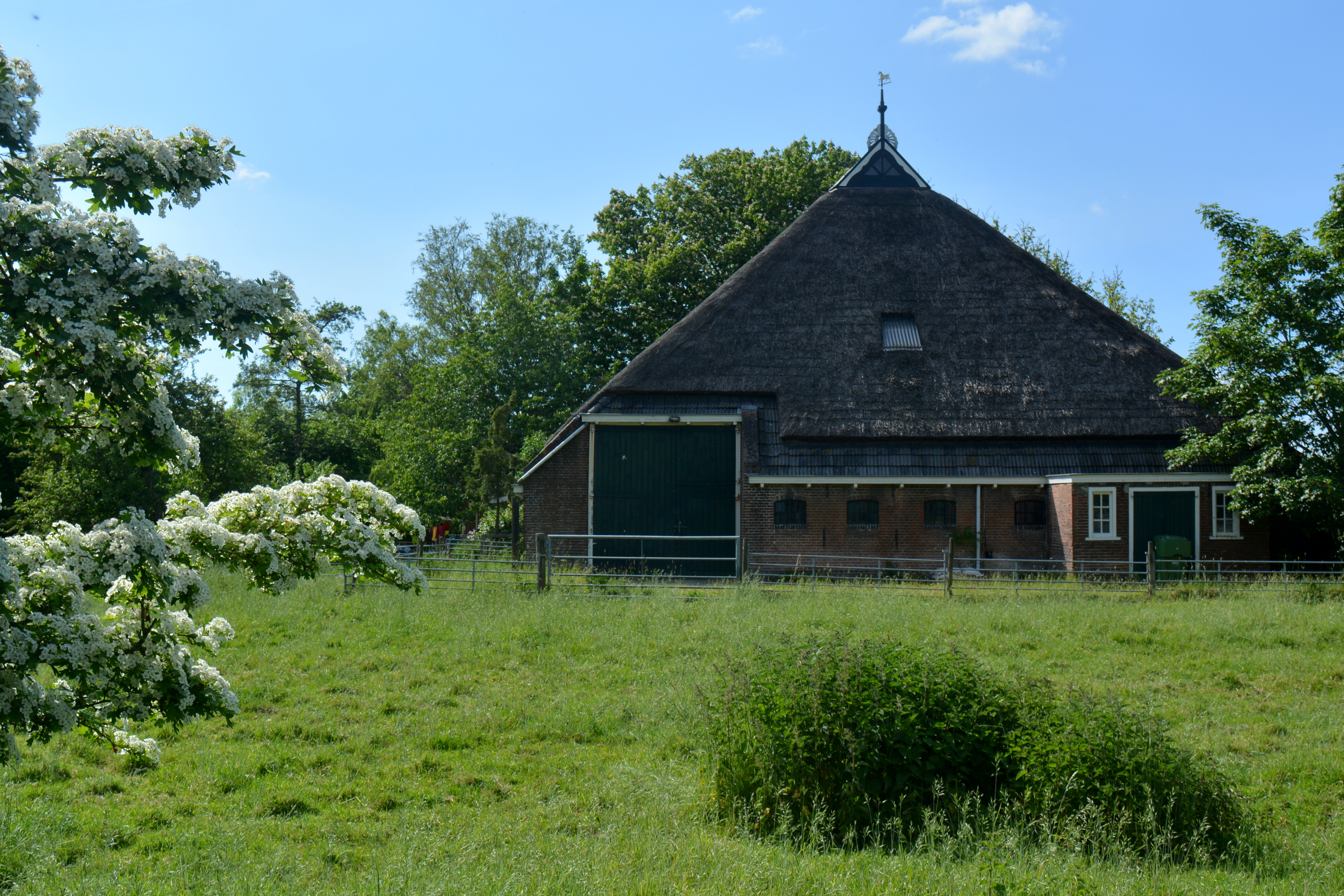
Farm in Hempens
