= Leeuwarden Middelsee railway station =

Railway station in the Netherlands

Leeuwarden Middelsee

General information
- Location: Netherlands
- Coordinates: 53°09′36″N 5°47′12″E
- Line: Staatslijn A (Arnhem - Zwolle - Leeuwarden)
- Platforms: 2
- Tracks: 2
Location
- Location within Netherlands

Leeuwarden Middelsee is a railway station under construction, in southern Leeuwarden, Netherlands.

== History ==
The station was set to open between 2018 and 2020 in the Werpsterhoeke neighbourhood. The station will be opened on Staatslijn A (Arnhem - Zwolle - Leeuwarden) and is located between Grou-Jirnsum and Leeuwarden. The station is primarily for southern Leeuwarden as it lies adjacent to the newly built boroughs De Zuidlanden en Nieuw Stroomland, which will feature a total of 6500 houses. It will also serve small settlements in the surrounding area. Construction of a combined pedestrian and bicycle passageway, north of the station, has started on 3 October 2015 and is set to open late 2016 or early 2017. The passageway will replace one nearby railroad crossing and provide relief for another one, also nearby. The passageway will also provide a direct connection to the station platforms. An additional passageway for cars is also set to open late 2016 or somewhere in 2017. The station will also feature a plaza with bicycle racks, a park and ride parking lot and a bus station. Construction of the passageways costs €21 million and construction of the station costs €9 million. The station is set to open in 2029.

== Train services ==
As of 2016 it is still unclear which train services will call at the station, but it is assumed that the following train will call:

Series	Train Type	Route	Material	Frequency
9000	NS stoptrein	Leeuwarden - Leeuwarden Werpsterhoeke - Grou-Jirnsum - Akkrum - Heerenveen - Wolvega - Meppel	ICMm	1x per hour (Mon-Fri only)

According to Werkgroep Spoor in Friesland, it is likely that Arriva trains between Groningen and Leeuwarden will also call at this station, but Arriva needs permission from NS in order to do so. If Arriva does get permission, the train that will call at this station is the following one:

Series	Train Type	Route	Material	Frequency
37400	Arriva Stoptrein	Groningen Europapark - Groningen - Zuidhorn - Grijpskerk - Buitenpost - De Westereen - Feanwâlden - Hurdegaryp - Leeuwarden Camminghaburen - Leeuwarden - Leeuwarden Werpsterhoeke	Spurt (Stadler GTW)	2x per hour (Mon-Sat), 1x per hour (Sun)

== Bus service ==
As of 2016, it's still unclear which bus services will call at this station, but it's likely to be the following bus services as they already serve the adjacent neighbourhoods and/or pass right through the location of this future station:

Bus Service	Operator	From	To	Via	Notes
28	Arriva	Heerenveen, Station	Leeuwarden, Busstation	Grou-Jirnsum, Station	Mon-Fri only
95	Arriva	Joure, Rotonde	Leeuwarden, Busstation		
742	Arriva	Leeuwarden, Busstation	Techum, Molkenkelder		
