= Mantgum railway station =

Railway station in the Netherlands

Mantgum
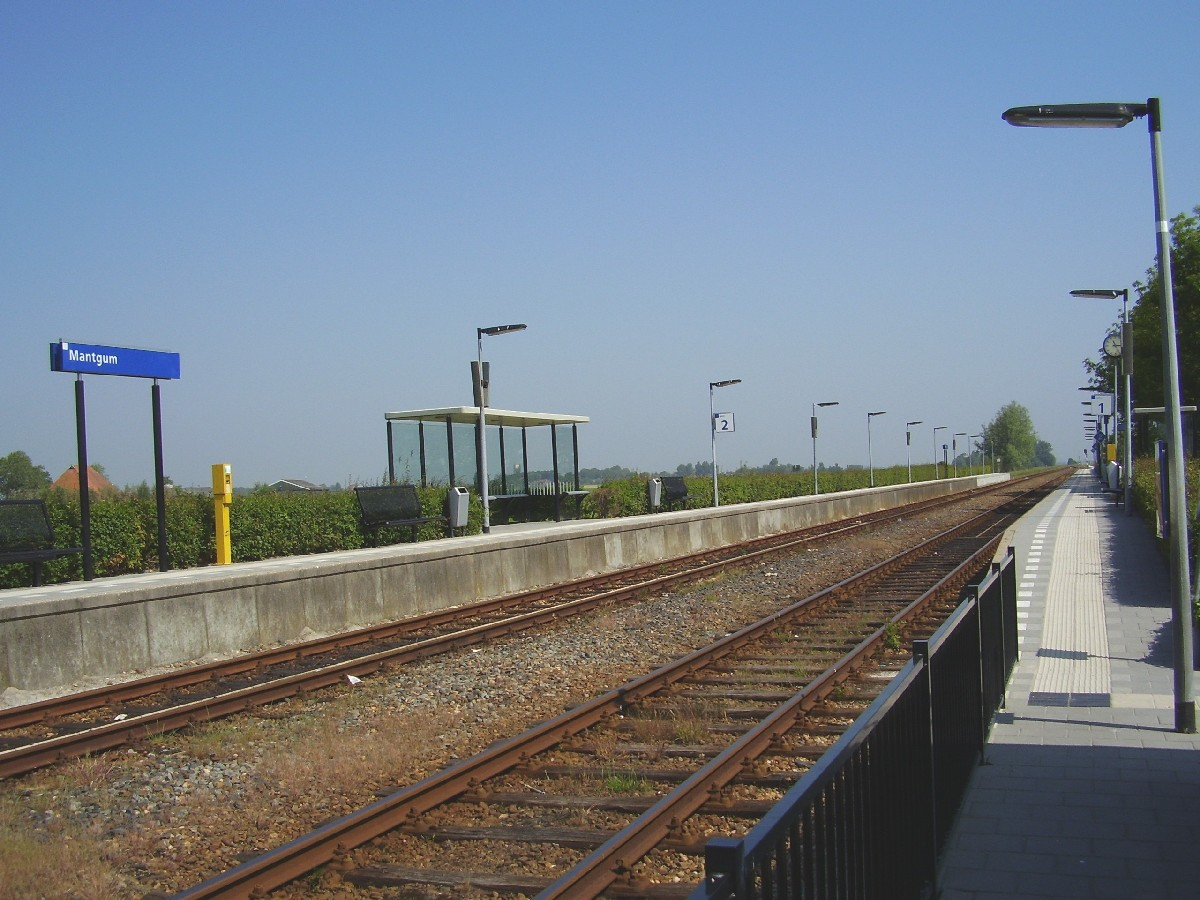

General information
- Location: Netherlands
- Coordinates: 53°07′47″N 5°42′48″E
- Line: Leeuwarden–Stavoren railway

History
- Opened: 16 June 1883

Services
Preceding station	Arriva Netherlands	Following station
Leeuwarden Terminus	Stoptrein 37000	Sneek Noord towards Sneek
Leeuwarden Terminus	Stoptrein 37100	Sneek Noord towards Stavoren
Location
- Location within Netherlands

Mantgum is a railway station in Mantgum, Netherlands. The station opened on 16 June 1883 and is located on the Leeuwarden–Stavoren railway. The services are operated by Arriva. The station was closed between 15 May 1938 and 1 May 1940 and between 24 November 1940 and 3 June 1973. The station is 10 km from Leeuwarden and 12 km from Sneek.

== Train services ==
The following services currently call at Mantgum:

- 2x per hour local service (stoptrein) Leeuwarden - Sneek
- 1x per hour local service (stoptrein) Leeuwarden - Sneek - Stavoren

== Bus services ==
The following bus services depart from the outside the station:

- 93: Leeuwarden NS - Deinum - Boksum - Jellum - Bears - Weidum - Jorwert - Mantgum - Easterwierrum - Sneek

The 93 is operated by Arriva and operates Monday to Saturday 1x per hour.

== See also ==
- List of railway stations in Friesland
