= Sneek railway station =

Railway station in Sneek, Friesland, Netherlands

Sneek
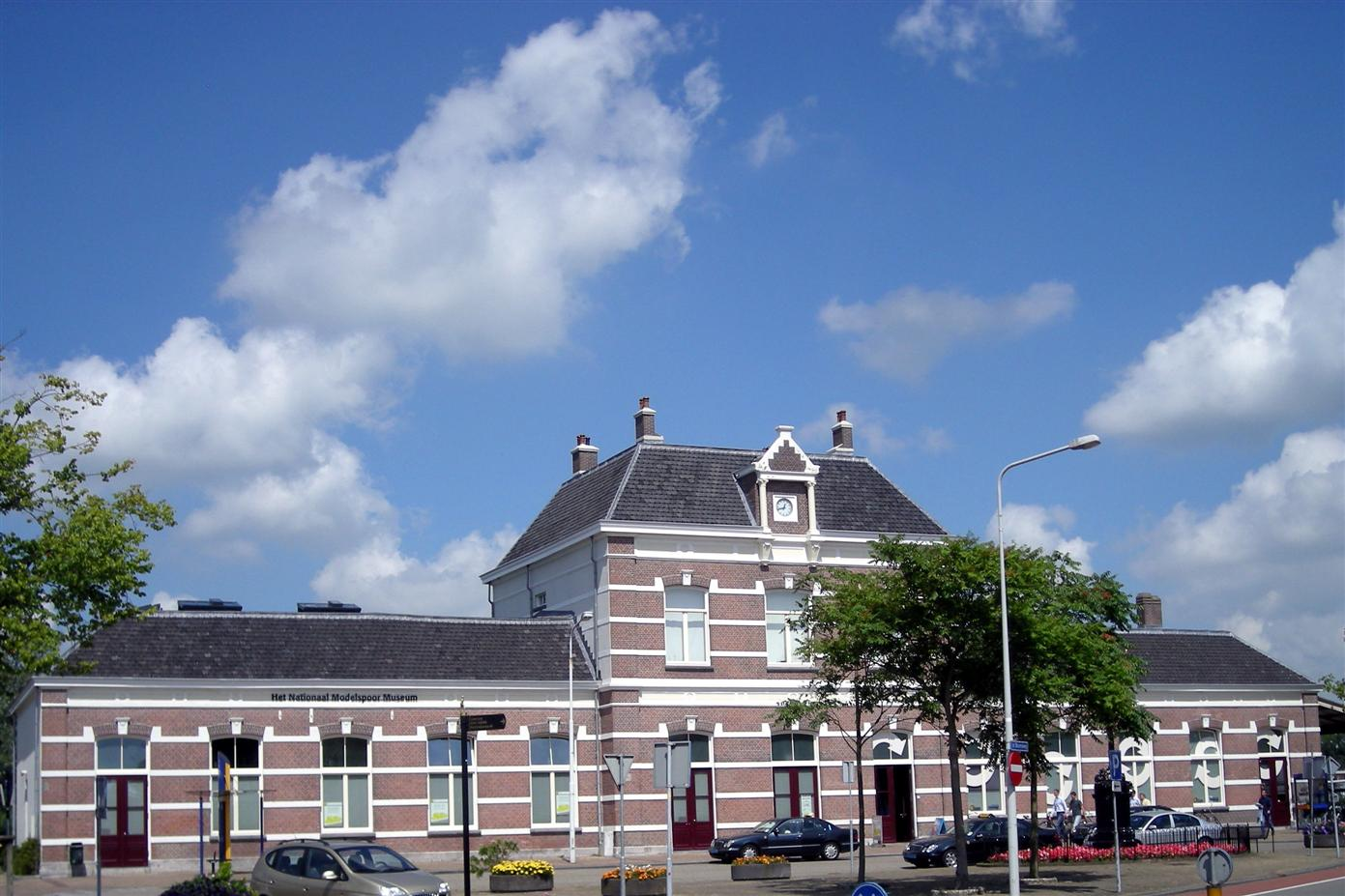

General information
- Location: Netherlands
- Coordinates: 53°01′56″N 5°39′06″E
- Line: Leeuwarden–Stavoren railway

History
- Opened: 16 June 1883

Services
Preceding station	Arriva Netherlands	Following station
Sneek Noord towards Leeuwarden	Stoptrein 37000	Terminus
Sneek Noord towards Leeuwarden	Stoptrein 37100	IJlst towards Stavoren
Location
- Location within Netherlands

Sneek is a railway station in Sneek, Netherlands. The station opened on 16 June 1883 and is located on the Leeuwarden–Stavoren railway. Until the line was finished in 1885, this station was the terminus. In 1921 a connection was made with the tramway running between Sneek and Bolsward, which stopped in 1968. The train services are operated by Arriva.

== Train services ==
The following services currently call at Sneek:

- 2x per hour local service (stoptrein) Leeuwarden - Sneek (1x per hour at weekends)
- 1x per hour local service (stoptrein) Leeuwarden - Sneek - Stavoren

== Bus services ==
The following bus services depart from the bus station outside the station:

- 33 - Sneek - Scharnegoutum - Boazum - Wiuwert - Easterlittens - Baard - Winsum - Wjelsryp - Tzum - Franeker. - Arriva, 1x per hour, Monday to Friday
- 42 - Sneek - N354 - Lemmer - Rutten / Creil - Espel - Emmeloord. - Arriva, 2x per hour, Daily. 1x per hour via Rutten and 1x per hour via Creil and Espel.
- 45 - Sneek - Hommerts - Woudsend - Elahuizen - Oudega - Hemelum. - Arriva, 1x per hour, not between 9 am and 14.30, Daily
- 46 - Sneek - Hommerts - (Heeg - Gaastmeer) - Oudega. - Arriva, 1x per hour, Monday - Saturday
- 47 - Sneek - Hommerts - Woudsend - Balk - Sondel - Nijemirdum - Rijs - Hemelum. - Arriva, 1-3x per hour, Daily
- 93 - Leeuwarden - Deinum - Boksum - Jellum - Bears - Weidum - Jorwert - Mantgum - Easterwierrum - Sneek. - Arriva, 1x per hour, Monday to Saturday
- 94 - Sneek - Goenga - Raerd - Reduzum - Leeuwarden - Arriva, 1x per hour, Monday to Friday
- 98 - Makkum - Wons - Bolsward - Sneek - Joure - Oudehaske - Heerenveen NS. - Arriva, 2x per hour (Bolsward - Heerenveen), 1x per hour (Bolsward - Makkum), Daily
- 99 - Harlingen - Kimswerd - Arum - Witmarsum - Bolsward - Sneek - Joure - Heerenveen NS. - Arriva, 2x per hour, Daily

== See also ==
- List of railway stations in Friesland
