= List of railway stations in Friesland =

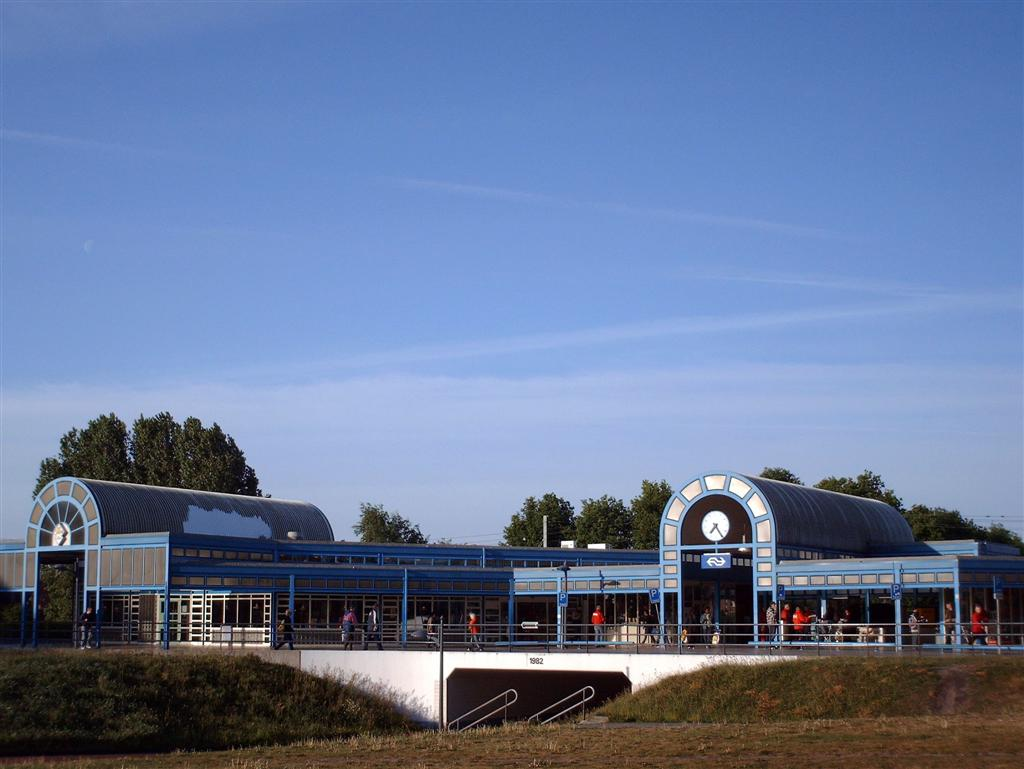
Heerenveen railway station

This is a list of railway stations in the Dutch province Friesland:

== Current stations ==
- Akkrum railway station
- Buitenpost railway station
- Deinum railway station
- De Westereen railway station
- Dronryp railway station
- Feanwâlden railway station
- Franeker railway station
- Grou-Jirnsum railway station
- Harlingen railway station
- Harlingen Haven railway station
- Heerenveen railway station
- Heerenveen IJsstadion railway station
- Hindeloopen railway station
- Hurdegaryp railway station
- Koudum-Molkwerum railway station
- Leeuwarden railway station
- Leeuwarden Camminghaburen railway station
- Mantgum railway station
- Sneek railway station
- Sneek Noord railway station
- Stavoren railway station
- Wolvega railway station
- Workum railway station
- IJlst railway station

== Closed stations ==
- Anjum railway station
- Beers railway station
- Blija railway station
- Bozum railway station
- Dokkum-Aalsum railway station
- Dongjum railway station
- Ferwerd railway station
- Finkum railway station
- Franeker Halte railway station
- Hallum railway station
- Hantum railway station
- Hijum railway station
- Holwerd railway station
- Jelsum railway station
- Jorwerd railway station
- Leeuwarden Achter de Hoven railway station
- Leeuwarden Halte railway station
- Marrum-Westernijkerk railway station
- Metslawier railway station
- Midlum-Herbaijum railway station
- Minnertsga railway station
- Morra-Lioessens railway station
- Nijhuizum railway station
- Oosterbierum railway station
- Oudega railway station
- Peperga railway station
- Scharnegoutum railway station
- Sexbierum-Pietersbierum railway station
- Sint Annaparochie railway station
- Sint Jacobiparochie railway station
- Stiens railway station
- Ternaard railway station
- Tietjerk railway station
- Tzummarum railway station
- Vrouwbuurtstermolen railway station
- Vrouwenparochie railway station
- Warns railway station
- Wiewerd railway station
- Wijnaldum railway station

== See also ==
- Railway stations in the Netherlands
