= Jurjen van der Kooi =

Frisian folklorist (1943–2018)

- Born: 22 December 1943; Hurdegaryp
- Died: 4 September 2018 (aged 74); Drachten
- Occupations: folklorist, lecturer, scientific researcher
- Years active: ~1965 – 2018
- Notable work: De Nachtmerje fan Rawier; De Wiete Poes
- Awards: Europäische Märchenpreis 1997

Jurjen van der Kooi (Hurdegaryp, 22 December 1943 – Drachten, 4 September 2018) was a Dutch university lecturer and folklorist from Frisia. He was widely recognized as an authority in the field of folk tales from Frisia, Northern Netherlands and parts of northern Germany.

== Life and career ==
Van der Kooi was born in 1943 in Hurdegaryp. He studied literature and until his retirement in 2004 was head lecturer and associate professor of folklore and oral literature at the University of Groningen. In that capacity he was also active as a scientific researcher of folk tales from the Northern Netherlands, Eastern Netherlands and parts of northern Germany.

In 1984, he obtained his doctorate cum laude on Volksverhalen in Friesland: Lectuur en Mondelinge Overlevering. The central point of that thesis was Van der Kooi's statement that many folktales in Frisia have not been handed down from parent to parent for centuries, but actually often go back to (written) publications from the nineteenth century that have been handed down in retold form. In 1997 he was awarded the Europäische Märchenpreis, and in 2004 he received the Totius Frisiae Siegel from the Ostfriesische Landschaft for his entire oeuvre.

Unlike e.g. Dam Jaarsma and Ype Poortinga, Van der Kooi did not go out with a tape recorder to record folk tales by himself, but he studied folk tales that had already been recorded by others. His most important insight was the collection and categorization of folk tales, folk rhymes and proverbs from Northern Netherlands, East Friesland and North Friesland. Van der Kooi considered folktales as a common cultural asset, from which it can be deduced how people used to live and how society has developed over the years.

Van der Kooi wrote many publications, including De Nachtmerje van Rawier, in which he brought together a number of Frisian legends about the supernatural, and De Wiete Poes, in which together with Douwe Kootstra he compiled a series of wild folk tales collected in which were omitted from most other books. Van der Kooi died in Drachten in 2018, at the age of 74.

== Works ==
- 1984 – Volksverhalen in Friesland: Lectuur en Mondelinge Overlevering (Dissertation)
- 1990 – Dialectliteratuur
- 1990 – Friesische Märchen (with B.A. Gezelle Meerburg)
- 1994 – Friesische Sagen (1994)
- 1996 – Spiegel van Groningen (with P.Th.F.M. Boekholt)
- 1997 – Untank Is it Lean fan 'e Wrâld: Folksferhalen op Rym
- 1998 – Der Ring im Fischbauch
- 2000 – De Nachtmerje fan Rawier
- 2001 – Dizionario delle fiabe e delle favole (with T. Dekker en T. Meder)
- 2003 – Van Janmaanje en Keudeldoemke
- 2003 – Die Frau die verlorenging. Sagen aus Ostfriesland (with T. Schuster)
- 2007 – Alle Beetjes Helpen: Nederlandse, Friese en Vlaamse Wellerismen (with Heinrich L. Cox e.o.)
- 2011 – De Herder Is Myn Redder
- 2017 – De Wiete Poes (with Douwe Kootstra)

== Sources ==
- Schroor, Meindert (head red.), Nieuwe Encyclopedie van Fryslân, De Gordyk/Ljouwert, 2016 (Utjouwerij Bornmeer/Tresoar), ISBN 978-9 05 6153 755, p. 1535.
- ――, Volksverhalenexpert Van der Kooi overleden, in: Leeuwarder Courant, 10 September 2018, p. 28.
