= Buitenpost railway station =

Railway station in the Netherlands

Buitenpost
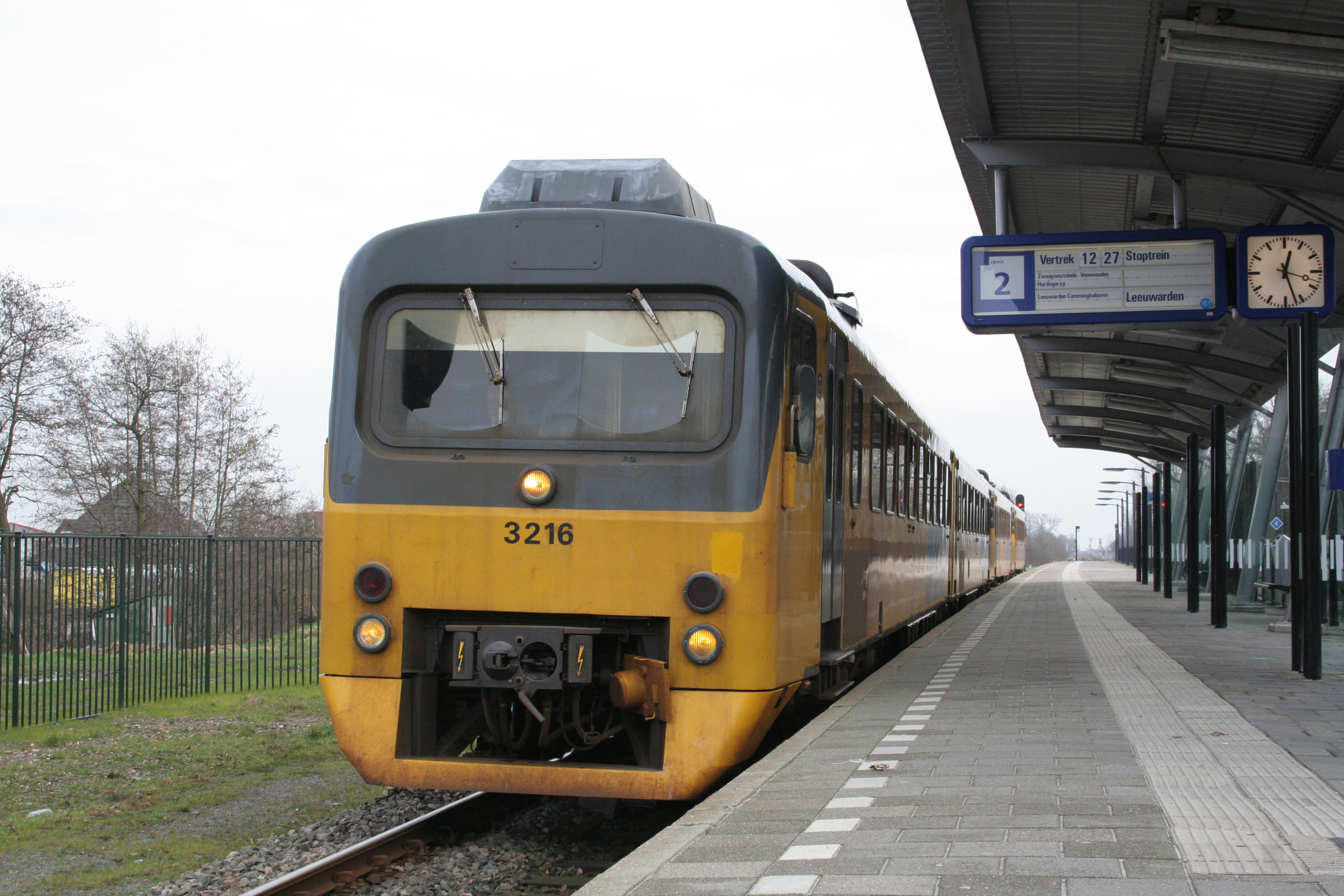

General information
- Location: Netherlands
- Coordinates: 53°15′22″N 6°08′42″E
- Line: Harlingen–Nieuweschans railway

History
- Opened: 1 June 1866

Services
Preceding station	Arriva Netherlands	Following station
Leeuwarden Terminus	Sneltrein 37300	Groningen Terminus
De Westereen towards Leeuwarden	Stoptrein 37400	Grijpskerk towards Groningen
Location
- Location within Netherlands

Buitenpost is a railway station located in Buitenpost, Netherlands. The station was opened on 1 June 1866 and is located on the Harlingen–Nieuweschans railway between Leeuwarden and Groningen. The station is currently operated by Arriva.

== Train services ==
The station is served by the following service(s):

- 1x per hour express service (sneltrein) Leeuwarden - Groningen
- 2x per hour local service (stoptrein) Leeuwarden - Groningen

== Bus services ==
- 12: Buitenpost - Augustinusga - Surhuizum - Surhuisterveen - Drachten
- 62: Buitenpost - Kollum - Kollumerzwaag - De Westereen - Feanwâlden - Hurdegaryp - Leeuwarden
- 63: Buitenpost - Kollum - Dokkum
- 101: Buitenpost - Gerkesklooster - Lutjegast - Grootegast
- 101: Buitenpost - Twijzel - Kootstermolen
- 261: Buitenpost - Veenklooster - Damwâld (DRT)

All lines are operated by Arriva.

== See also ==
- List of railway stations in Friesland
