= Sneek Noord railway station =

Railway station in the Netherlands

Sneek Noord
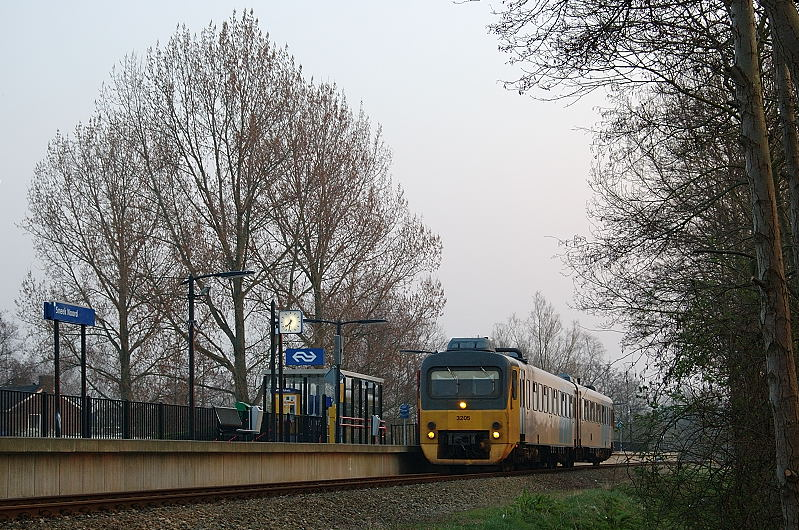

General information
- Location: Netherlands
- Coordinates: 53°02′25″N 5°39′47″E
- Line: Leeuwarden–Stavoren railway

History
- Opened: 3 June 1973

Services
Preceding station	Arriva Netherlands	Following station
Mantgum towards Leeuwarden	Stoptrein 37000	Sneek Terminus
Mantgum towards Leeuwarden	Stoptrein 37100	Sneek towards Stavoren
Location
- Location within Netherlands

Sneek Noord is a railway station in Sneek, Netherlands. The station opened on 3 June 1973 and is located on the Leeuwarden–Stavoren railway. The train services are operated by Arriva.

== Train services ==
Route	Service type	Operator	Notes
Leeuwarden - Sneek	Local ("Stoptrein")	Arriva	2x per hour - Mon-Sat during daytime hours only
Leeuwarden - Sneek - Stavoren	Local ("Stoptrein")	Arriva	1x per hour

== Bus services ==
There is no bus service at this station. The nearest bus stop is located at the Leeuwarderweg.

== See also ==
- List of railway stations in Friesland
