= Zuidhorn railway station =

Railway station in the Netherlands

Zuidhorn
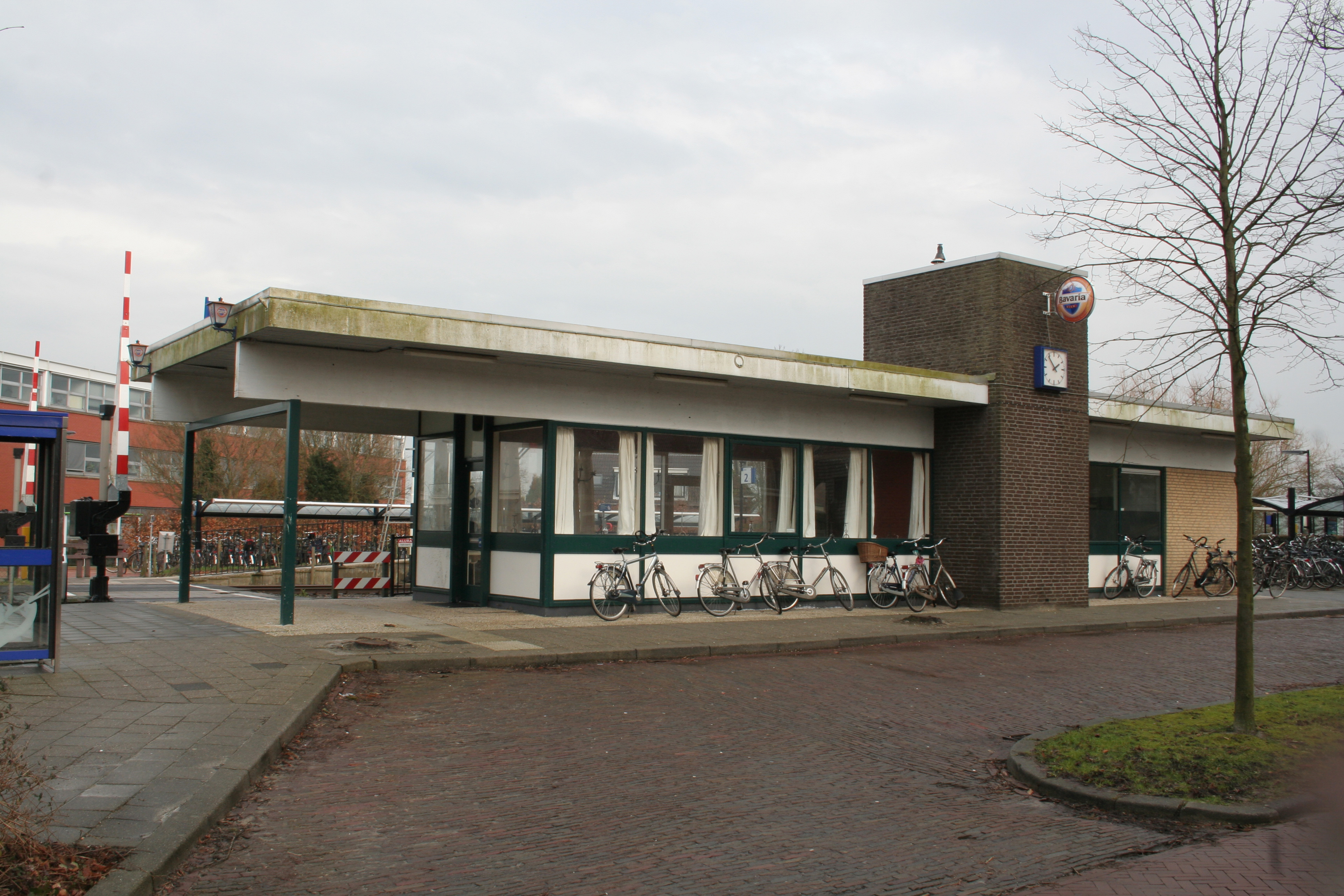

General information
- Location: Netherlands
- Coordinates: 53°14′54″N 6°24′20″E
- Line: Harlingen–Nieuweschans railway

History
- Opened: 1 June 1866

Services
| Preceding station | Arriva Netherlands | Following station |
|---|---|---|
| Grijpskerk towards Leeuwarden | Stoptrein 37400 | Groningen Terminus |
Location
- Location within Netherlands

Zuidhorn (Dutch pronunciation: [ˈzœytɦɔr(ə)n]; abbreviation: Zh) is a railway station located in Zuidhorn in the Netherlands. The station was opened on 1 June 1866 and is located on the Harlingen–Nieuweschans railway between Leeuwarden and Groningen. The train service is operated by Arriva.

== Train services ==
| Route | Service type | Operator | Notes |
|---|---|---|---|
| Leeuwarden - Groningen | Local ("Stoptrein") | Arriva | 2x per hour - 1x per hour after 20:00 and on Sundays |
| Zuidhorn - Groningen | Local ("Stoptrein") | 1 run during morning rush hour only. | |

== Bus services ==
| Line | Route | Operator | Notes |
|---|---|---|---|
| 1 | Groningen Hoofdstation - Groningen Centrum (Downtown) - Groningen Station Noord - Groningen Paddepoel - Groningen Zernike - Groningen P+R Reitdiep (- Slaperstil - Aduard - Zuidhorn) | Qbuzz | Mon-Fri during daytime hours, this bus runs through from Groningen P+R Reitdiep to Zuidhorn. |
| 39 | Groningen - Slaperstil - Aduard - Zuidhorn - Niekerk - Oldekerk - Sebaldeburen - Grootegast - Doezum - Kornhorn - Opende - Surhuisterveen | Qbuzz | |
| 637 | (Groningen → Aduard →) Zuidhorn - Noordhorn - Grijpskerk - Kommerzijl - Munnekezijl - Zoutkamp | Qbuzz | Rush hours only. |
| 638 | Zuidhorn - Noordhorn - Niezijl - Grijpskerk - Grootegast | Qbuzz | 1 run during both rush hours only. On Wednesdays, the afternoon rush hour run is replaced by a run at noon. |
