= Leeuwarden Camminghaburen railway station =

Railway station in Leeuwarden, Netherlands

Leeuwarden Camminghaburen
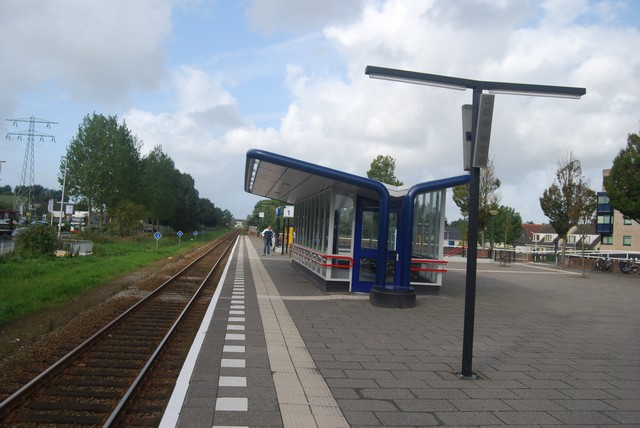

General information
- Location: Netherlands
- Coordinates: 53°12′07″N 5°50′32″E
- Line: Harlingen–Nieuweschans railway

History
- Opened: 2 June 1991

Services
Preceding station	Arriva Netherlands	Following station
Leeuwarden Terminus	Stoptrein 37400	Hurdegaryp towards Groningen
Location
- Location within Netherlands

Leeuwarden Camminghaburen is a suburb railway station in Leeuwarden, Netherlands. The station opened on 2 June 1991 and is located on the Harlingen–Nieuweschans railway between Leeuwarden and Groningen. Train services are operated by Arriva.

== Train services ==
Route	Service type	Operator	Notes
Leeuwarden - Groningen	Local ("Stoptrein")	Arriva	2x per hour - after 22:00 and on Sundays 1x per hour

== Bus services ==
Line	Route	Operator	Notes
782	Leeuwarden De Hemrik - Camminghaburen	Arriva	This bus only operates if called 1,5 hours before its supposed departure ("belbus"). This bus only operates Mon-Fri during daytime hours.

Regular city bus service serves the neighborhood of Camminghaburen, but not the station.

== See also ==
- List of railway stations in Friesland
