= Hurdegaryp railway station =

Railway station in the Netherlands

Hurdegaryp

General information
- Location: Netherlands
- Coordinates: 53°13′07″N 5°56′05″E
- Line: Harlingen–Nieuweschans railway

History
- Opened: 1 June 1866

Services
Preceding station	Arriva Netherlands	Following station
Leeuwarden Camminghaburen towards Leeuwarden	Stoptrein 37400	Feanwâlden towards Groningen
Location
- Location within Netherlands

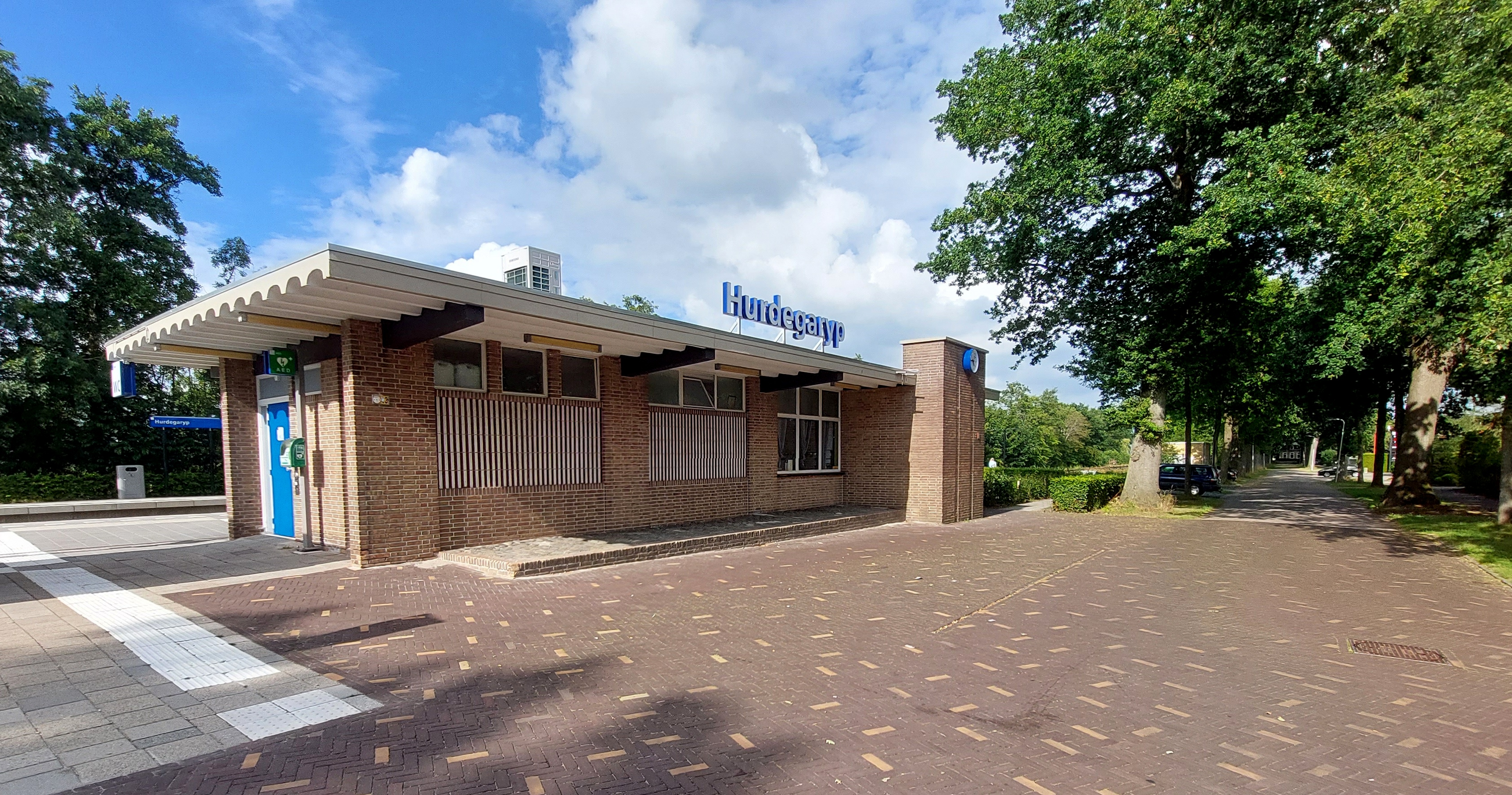
Hurdegaryp Station Building

Hurdegaryp (called Hardegarijp until 1999) is a railway station located in Hurdegaryp, Netherlands. The station was opened on 1 June 1866 and is located on the Harlingen–Nieuweschans railway between Leeuwarden and Groningen. The train service is operated by Arriva.

Until 30 May 1999 the station was called Hardegarijp, the Dutch name for the village.

== Train services ==
Route	Service type	Operator	Notes
Leeuwarden - Groningen	Local ("Stoptrein")	Arriva	2x per hour - 1x per hour after 21:00 and on Sundays

== Bus services ==
Line	Route	Operator	Notes
20	Heerenveen - De Knipe - Langezwaag - Gorredijk - Lippenhuizen - Beetsterzwaag - Drachten - Opeinde - Nijega - Sumar - Burgum - Quatrebras - Hurdegaryp - Leeuwarden	Arriva	
21	Heerenveen - De Knipe - Langezwaag - Gorredijk - Lippenhuizen - Beetsterzwaag - Drachten - Sumar - Burgum - Quatrebas - Hurdegaryp - Leeuwarden	Arriva	No evening, Saturday morning and Sunday service.

== See also ==
- List of railway stations in Friesland
