= Mantgum =

- Village
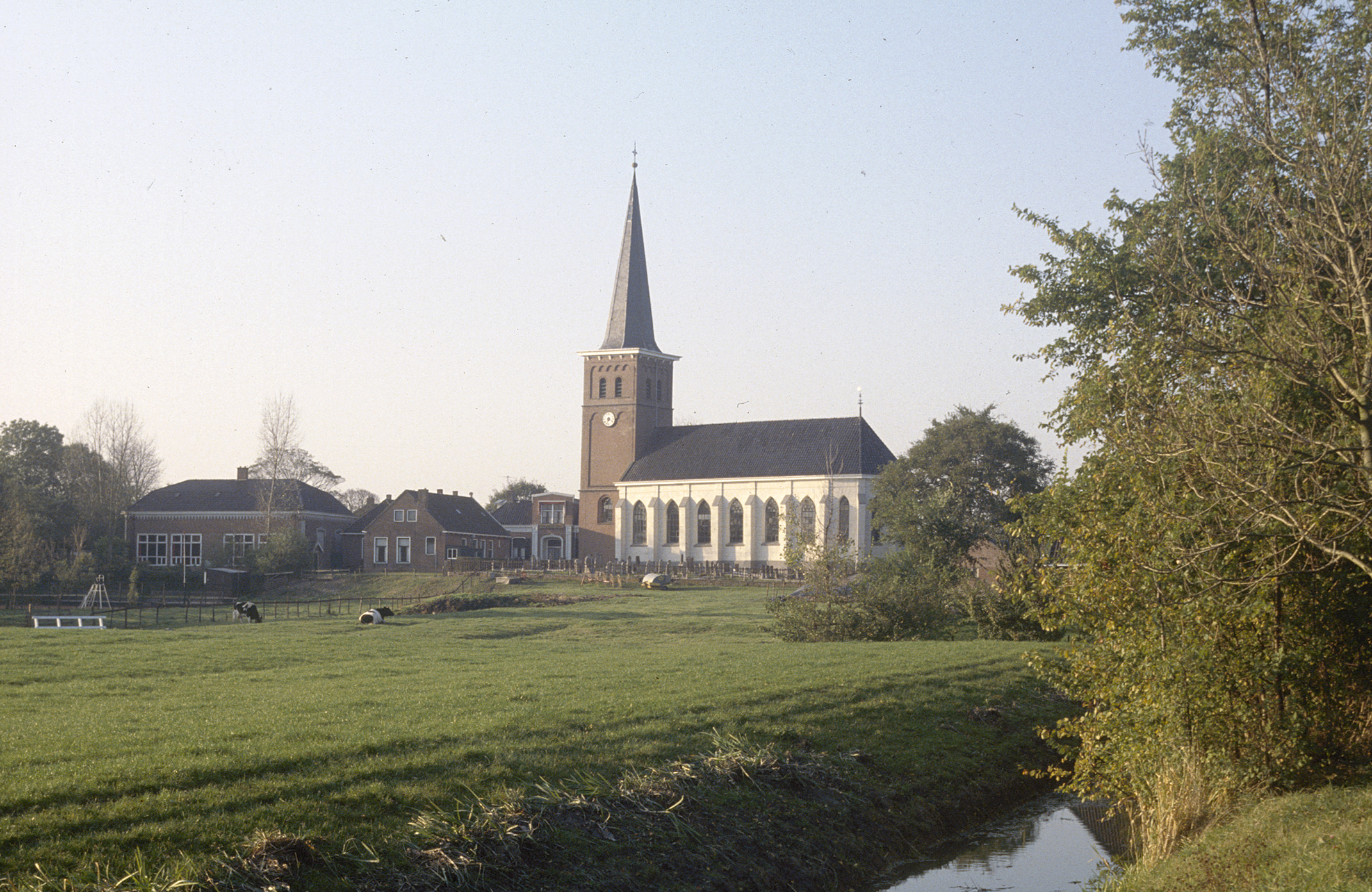
- St Mary's church

- Flag Coat of arms

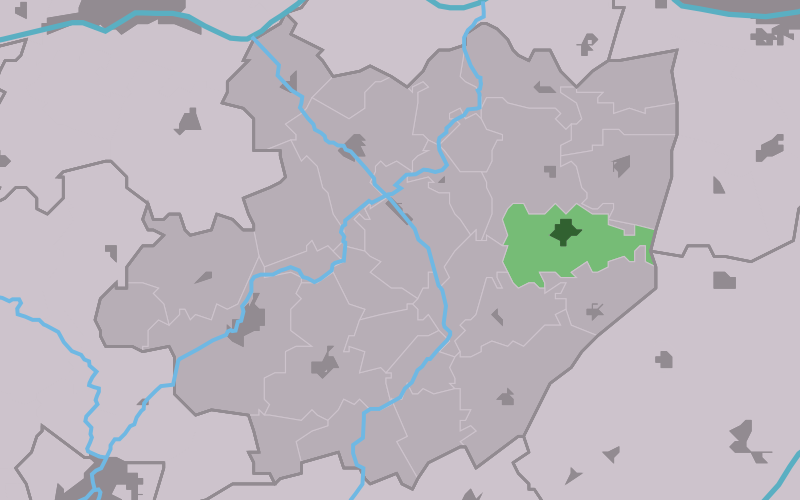
- Location in the former Littenseradiel municipality

- Location in the Netherlands Mantgum (Netherlands)
- Coordinates: 53°7′47″N 5°43′11″E
- Country: Netherlands
- Province: Friesland
- Municipality: Leeuwarden

Area
  - Total: 5.90 km^{2} (2.28 sq mi)
- Elevation: 3 m (9.8 ft)

Population (2021)
  - Total: 1,145
  - Density: 194/km^{2} (503/sq mi)
- Time zone: UTC+1 (CET)
  - Summer (DST): UTC+2 (CEST)
- Postal code: 9022
- Dialing code: 058

Mantgum is a village in Leeuwarden municipality in the province Friesland of the Netherlands and had around 1,172 citizens in January 2017.

== History ==
The village was first mentioned in the 13th century Mantingum, and means "settlement of the people of Mante (person)". Mantgum is a terp (artificial living mound) village which originates from around 700. A main road used to pass through the village and over the terp. The Dutch Reformed church was built around 1500 as a replacement of a 13th century church. Between 1865 and 1867, it was enlarged and received Gothic Revival elements. The tower was added in 1868.

In 1840, Mantgum was home to 254 people. Around 1860, a large part of the terp was excavated. During the 19th century, villas were built in the village by wealthy citizens of Leeuwarden to retire in.

Before 2018, the village was part of the Littenseradiel municipality and before 1984 it belonged to Baarderadeel municipality.

== Transportation ==
Mantgum is served by the Mantgum railway station. The station was opened in 1883, but closed on 15 May 1938. It was reopened on 25 May 1940, but closed again in 24 November 1940. On 3 June 1973, it opened again, but without a building.

== Gallery ==
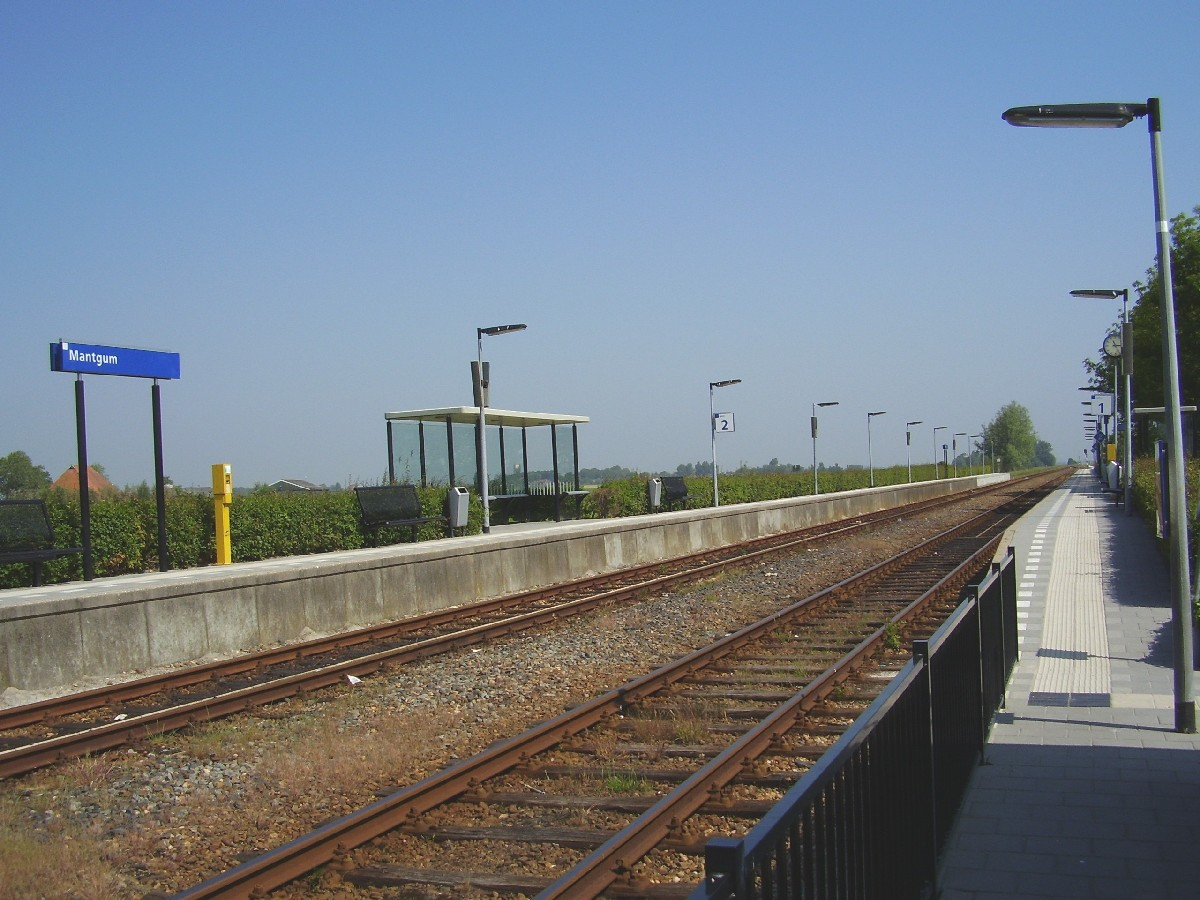
The station platform

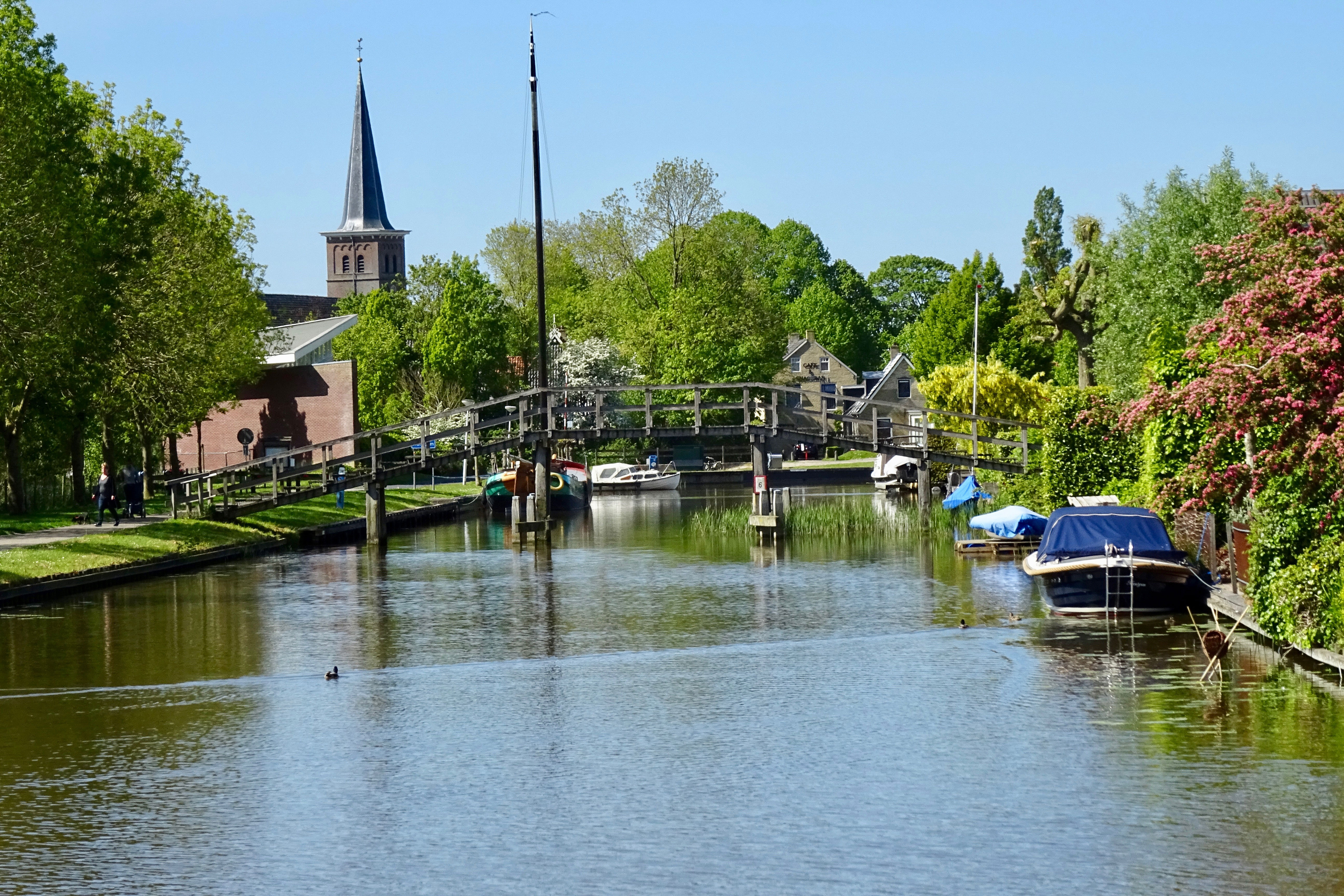
View on Mantgum from the canal

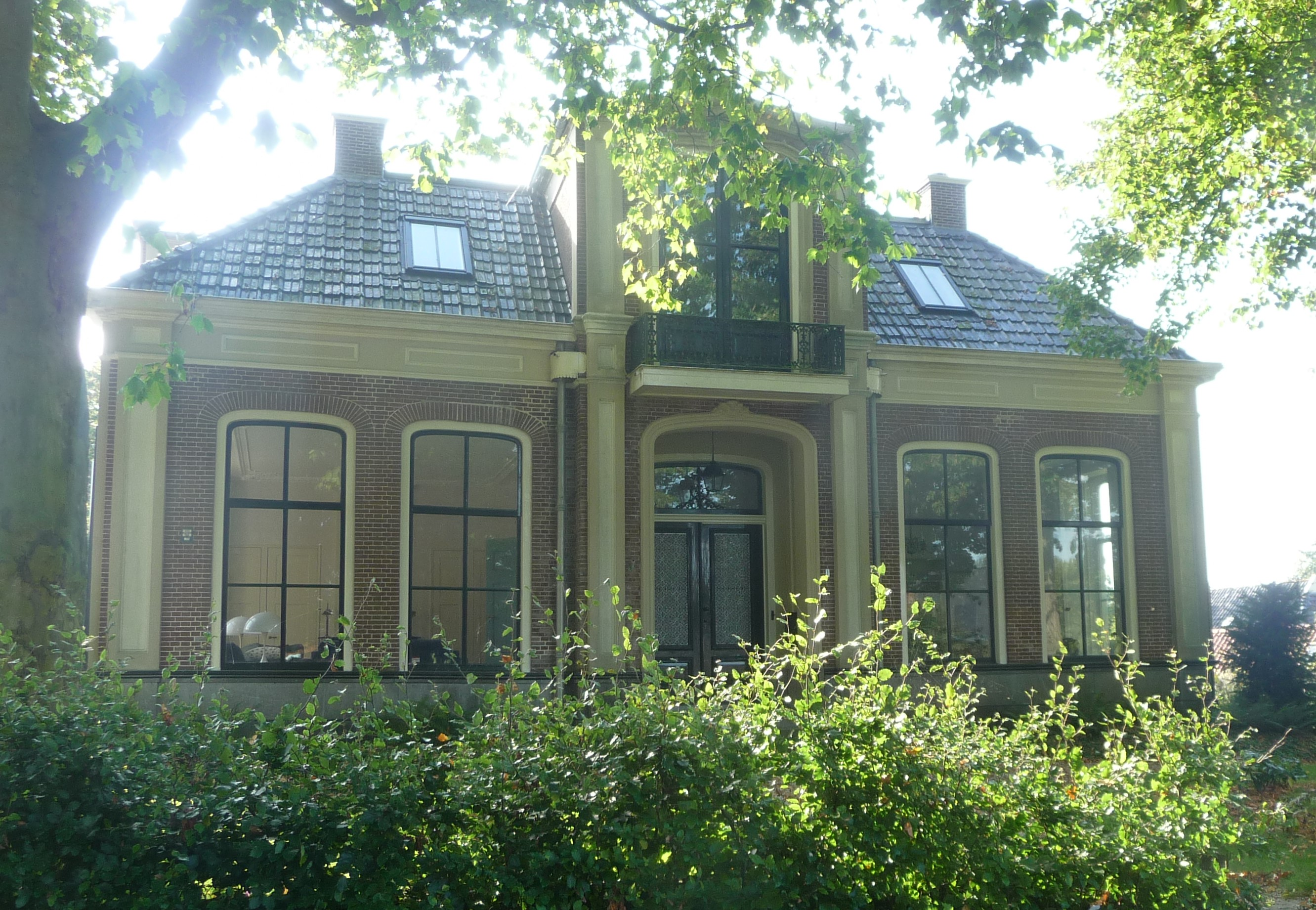
House in Mantgum

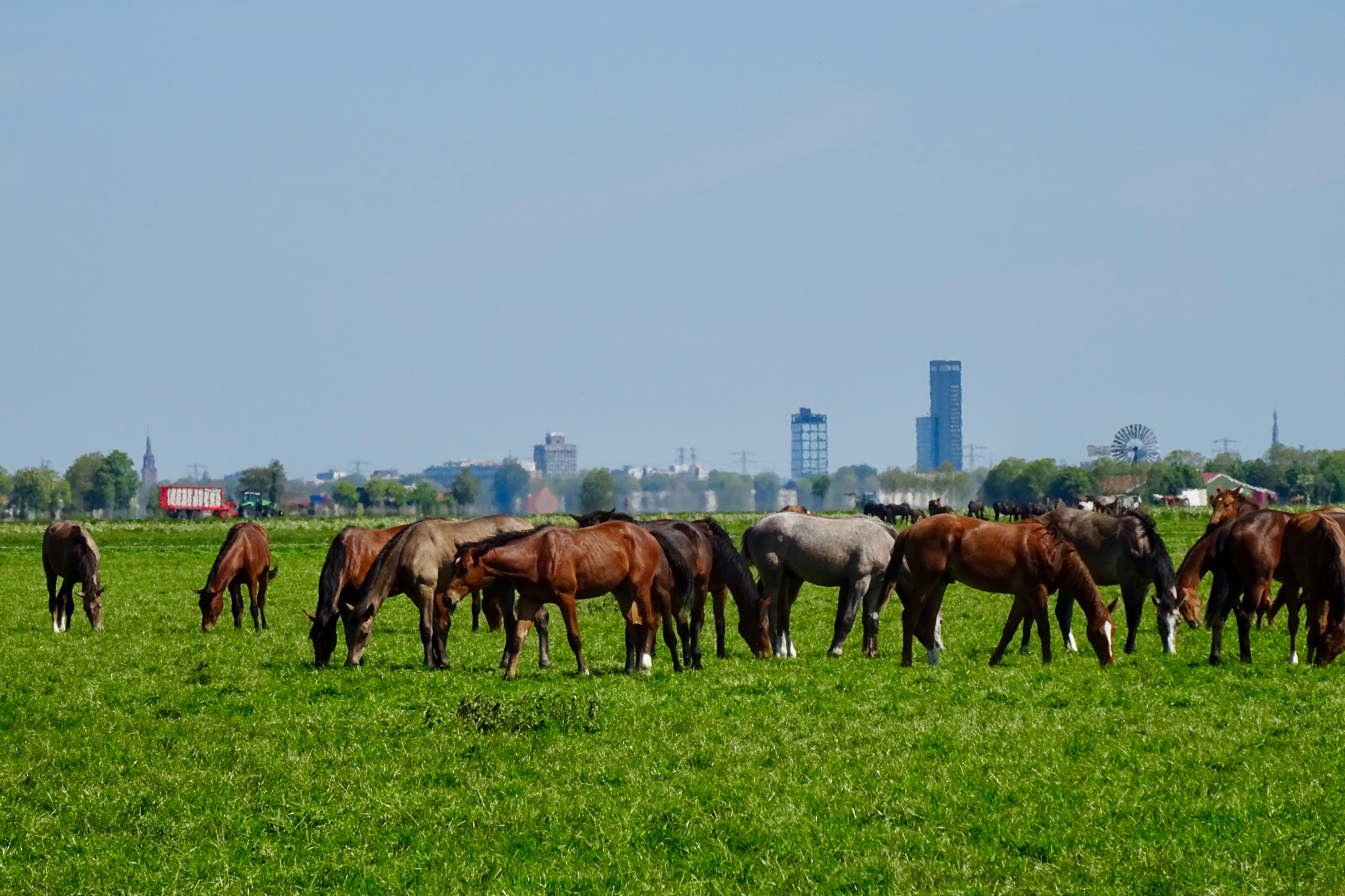
Horses in the meadow of Mantgum with Leeuwarden in the background
