= De Westereen railway station =

Railway station in the Netherlands

De Westereen

General information
- Location: Netherlands
- Coordinates: 53°14′54″N 6°02′07″E
- Line: Harlingen–Nieuweschans railway

History
- Opened: 1 October 1885

Services
Preceding station	Arriva Netherlands	Following station
Feanwâlden towards Leeuwarden	Stoptrein 37400	Buitenpost towards Groningen
Location
- Location within Netherlands

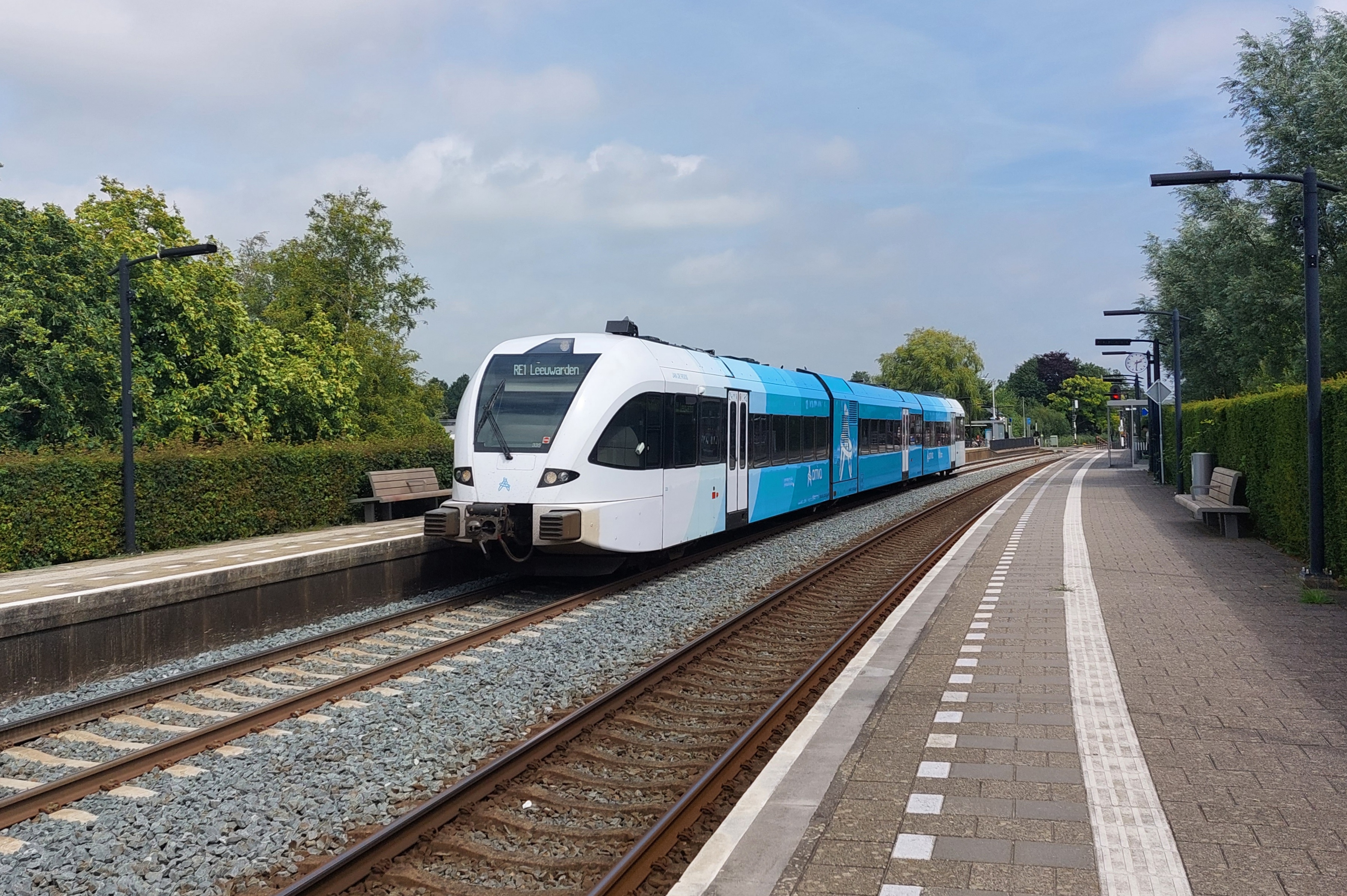
De Westereen station with WINK train heading to Ljouwert

De Westereen is a railway station located in De Westereen, Netherlands. The station was opened on 1 October 1885 and is located on the Harlingen–Nieuweschans railway between Leeuwarden and Groningen. Train services are operated by Arriva.

The station was called Zwaagwesteinde (the former Dutch name for the village) until 12 December 2015 when it was renamed De Westereen. This was to reflect the official name of the town, which was changed in 2009.

== Train services ==
Route	Service type	Operator	Notes
Leeuwarden - Groningen	Local ("Stoptrein")	Arriva	2x per hour - 1x per hour after 21:00 and on Sundays

== Bus services ==
Line	Route	Operator	Notes
770	Zwagerbosch - De Westereen	Arriva	This bus only operates if called 1,5 hours before its supposed departure ("belbus").

== See also ==
- List of railway stations in Friesland
