= Feanwâlden railway station =

Railway station in the Netherlands

Feanwâlden

General information
- Location: Netherlands
- Coordinates: 53°14′06″N 5°59′25″E
- Line: Harlingen–Nieuweschans railway

History
- Opened: 1 June 1866

Services
Preceding station	Arriva Netherlands	Following station
Hurdegaryp towards Leeuwarden	Stoptrein 37400	De Westereen towards Groningen
Location
- Location within Netherlands

Feanwâlden is a railway station located in Feanwâlden, Netherlands. The station was opened on 1 June 1866 and is located on the Harlingen–Nieuweschans railway between Leeuwarden and Groningen. Train services are operated by Arriva.

The station was called Veenwouden (the Dutch name for the village) until 12 December 2015 when it was renamed Feanwâlden. This is to reflect the Frisian name of the town, which was changed in 2009.

== Train services ==
Route	Service type	Operator	Notes
Leeuwarden - Groningen	Local ("Stoptrein")	Arriva	2x per hour - 1x per hour after 21:00 and on Sundays

== Bus services ==
Line	Route	Operator	Notes
55	Drachten - Sumar - Burgum - Quatrebras - Feanwâlden - Damwâld - Dokkum	Arriva	No service after 21:00 and on Sundays.
62	Buitenpost - Kollum - Oudwoude - Kollumerzwaag - De Westereen (- Feanwâlden) - Quatrebras - Leeuwarden	Arriva	Limited rush hour service to/from Feanwâlden. No evening and weekend service.
155	Leeuwarden - Quatrebras - Feanwâlden - Dokkum - Metslawier - Morra - Anjum - Lauwersoog	Arriva	
718	De Falom - Dokkum/Feanwâlden	Arriva	This bus only operates if called 1,5 hours before its supposed departure ("belbus").
742	Broeksterwâld - Dokkum/Feanwâlden	Arriva	This bus only operates if called 1,5 hours before its supposed departure ("belbus"). This bus only operates on evenings and Sundays, with one extra planned run on Saturday mornings.
763	Dokkum - Feanwâlden	Arriva	This bus only operates if called 1,5 hours before its supposed departure ("belbus"). This bus only operates on Sundays, with two extra planned runs during weekday evenings.
764	Damwâld - Feanwâlden	Arriva	This bus only operates if called 1,5 hours before its supposed departure ("belbus"). This bus only operates on Sundays, with two extra planned runs during weekday evenings.

== See also ==
- List of railway stations in Friesland
