= Grijpskerk railway station =

Railway station in the Netherlands

Grijpskerk
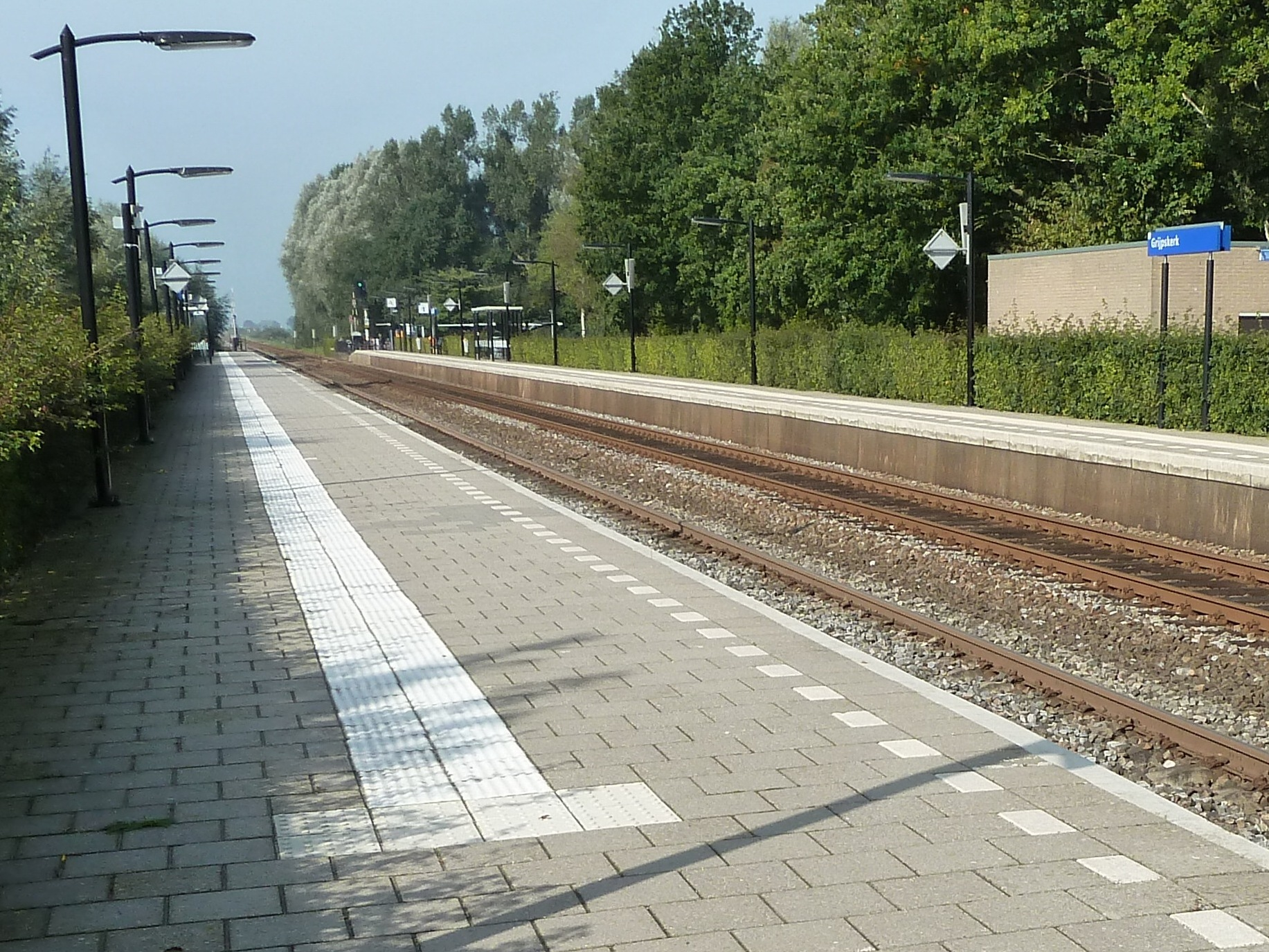
- Grijpskerk railway station in 2010

General information
- Location: Stationsstraat; Grijpskerk, Netherlands
- Coordinates: 53°15′20″N 6°18′38″E
- Owner: NS Stations
- Line: Harlingen–Nieuweschans railway
- Train operators: Arriva

Other information
- Station code: Gk

History
- Opened: 1 June 1866

Services
Preceding station	Arriva Netherlands	Following station
Buitenpost towards Leeuwarden	Stoptrein 37400	Zuidhorn towards Groningen
Location
- Location within Netherlands

Grijpskerk (Dutch pronunciation: [ɣrɛipsˈkɛr(ə)k]; abbreviation: Gk) is an unstaffed railway station in Grijpskerk, Netherlands. It is located on the Harlingen–Nieuweschans railway between Buitenpost and Zuidhorn.

The station was opened on 1 June 1866. The train service is operated by Arriva.

== Train services ==
Route	Service type	Operator	Notes
Leeuwarden - Groningen	Local ("Stoptrein")	Arriva	2x per hour - 1x per hour after 21:00 and on Sundays

== Bus services ==
Line	Route	Operator	Notes
752	Kollumerpomp - Grijpskerk/Buitenpost	Arriva	This bus only operates if called 1,5 hours before its supposed departure ("belbus").
753	Warfstermolen - Grijpskerk/Buitenpost	Arriva	This bus only operates if called 1,5 hours before its supposed departure ("belbus").
754	Munnekezijl - Grijpskerk/Buitenpost	Arriva	This bus only operates if called 1,5 hours before its supposed departure ("belbus").
755	Burum - Grijpskerk/Buitenpost	Arriva	This bus only operates if called 1,5 hours before its supposed departure ("belbus").
