= Hurdegaryp =

Hurdegaryp Hardegarijp
- Village
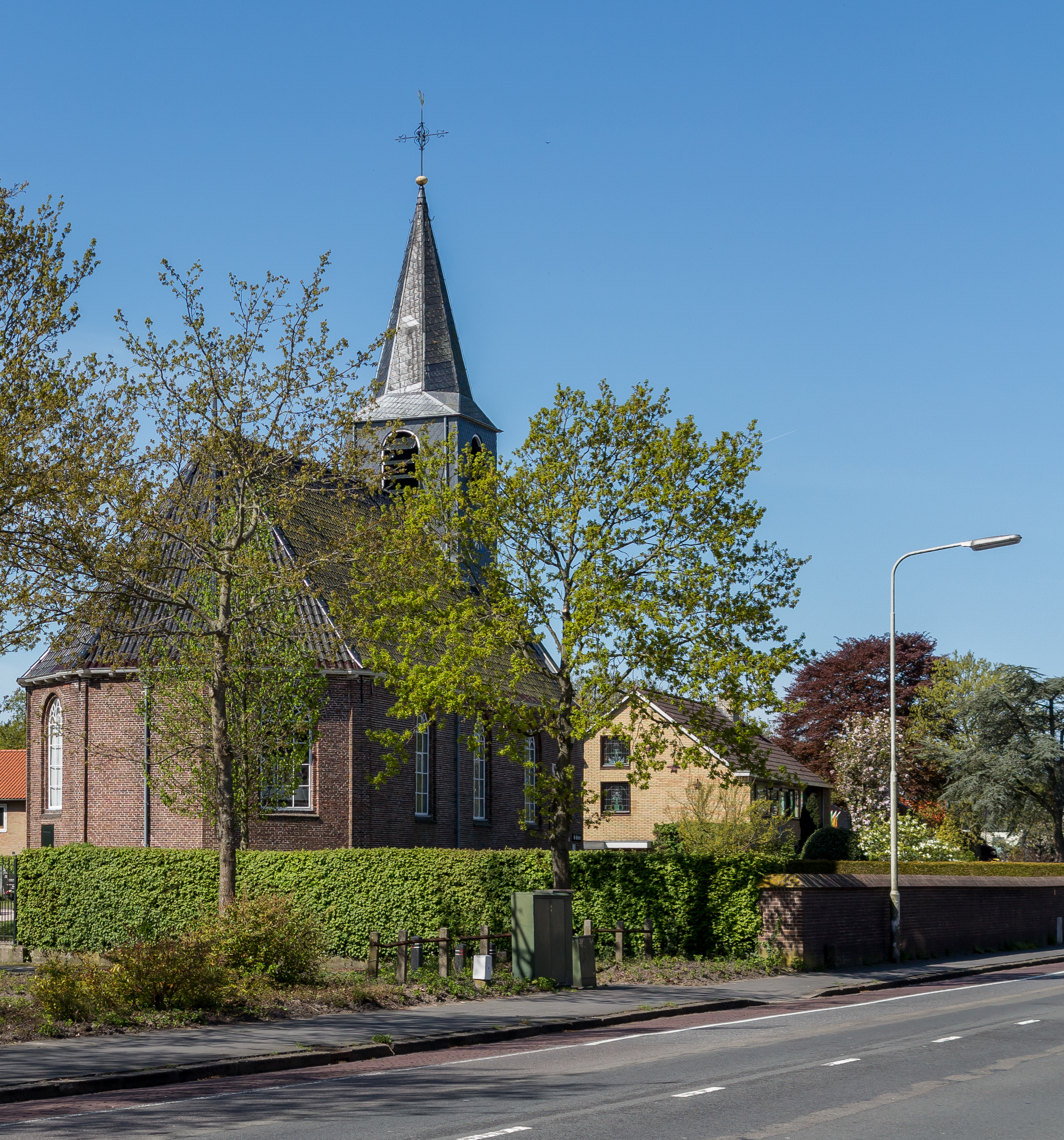
- Hurdegaryp, church (de Hofkerk)

- Flag Coat of arms

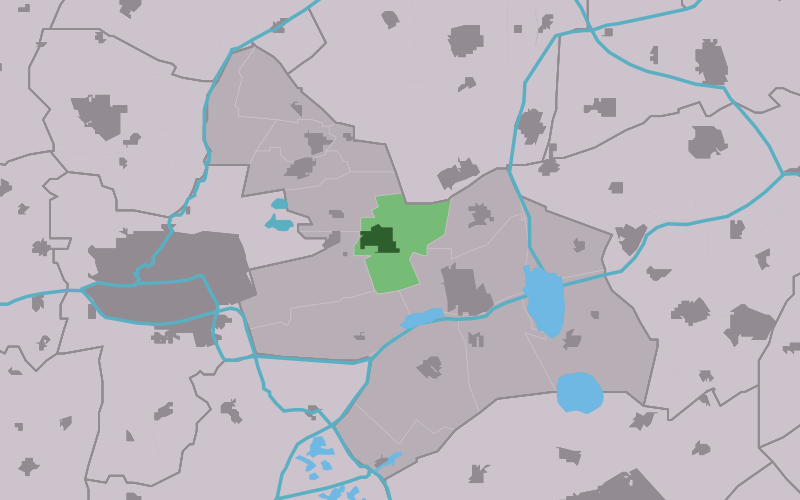
- Location of the village in Tytsjerksteradiel

- Location in the Netherlands Hurdegaryp (Netherlands)
- Country: Netherlands
- Province: Friesland
- Municipality: Tytsjerksteradiel

Area
  - Total: 10.58 km^{2} (4.08 sq mi)
- Elevation: 0.7 m (2.3 ft)

Population (2021)
  - Total: 4,995
  - Density: 472.1/km^{2} (1,223/sq mi)
- Time zone: UTC+1 (CET)
  - Summer (DST): UTC+2 (CEST)
- Postal code: 9254
- Dialing code: 0511

Hurdegaryp (Dutch: Hardegarijp) is a village in the northern part of the Netherlands, in the municipality of Tytsjerksteradiel. Its history dates back to at least the 13th century. It had a population of around 4,788 in January 2017.

In Dutch the village is called Hardegarijp, Hurdegaryp is its West Frisian and official name.

== History ==
The village was first mentioned in 1401 as Herdegaryp. The etymology is unclear. Originally the centre of the village was located further south. In 1830, the road to Leeuwarden was built. The Hurdegaryp railway station followed in 1866, and the centre of the village moved towards to the road and station.

The Dutch Reformed church was built in 1711 and has a wooden tower. It was a replacement for a 13th century church. Up to 1829, the Grovestins, a fortified tower was located to the south of the village.

Hurdegaryp was home to 624 people in 1840, but its population has grown to around five thousand as of 2021. In 2017, five tiny houses measuring 3 by 9 metres were built in Hurdegaryp as affordable houses at €50,000.- It was an initiative of a starting real estate agent who himself could not afford to exchange his rented student room with a house. They were immediately sold.

Hurdegaryp was the focus of national attention in the early 1950s, over a decision of the local Dutch Reformed Church Council to stop the formation of a Christian school.

== Transportation ==
- Hurdegaryp railway station

== Gallery ==
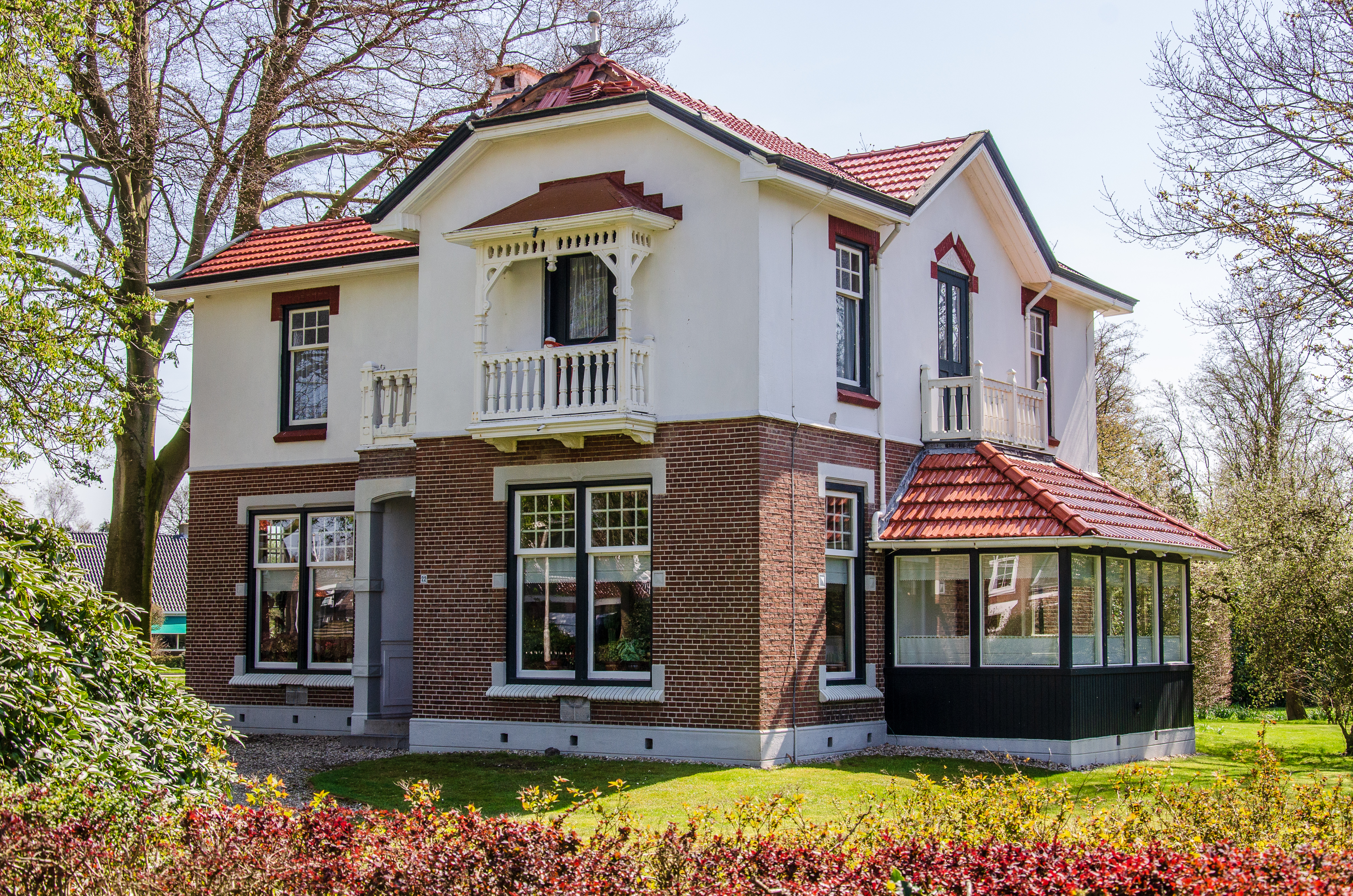
Villa in Hurdegaryp

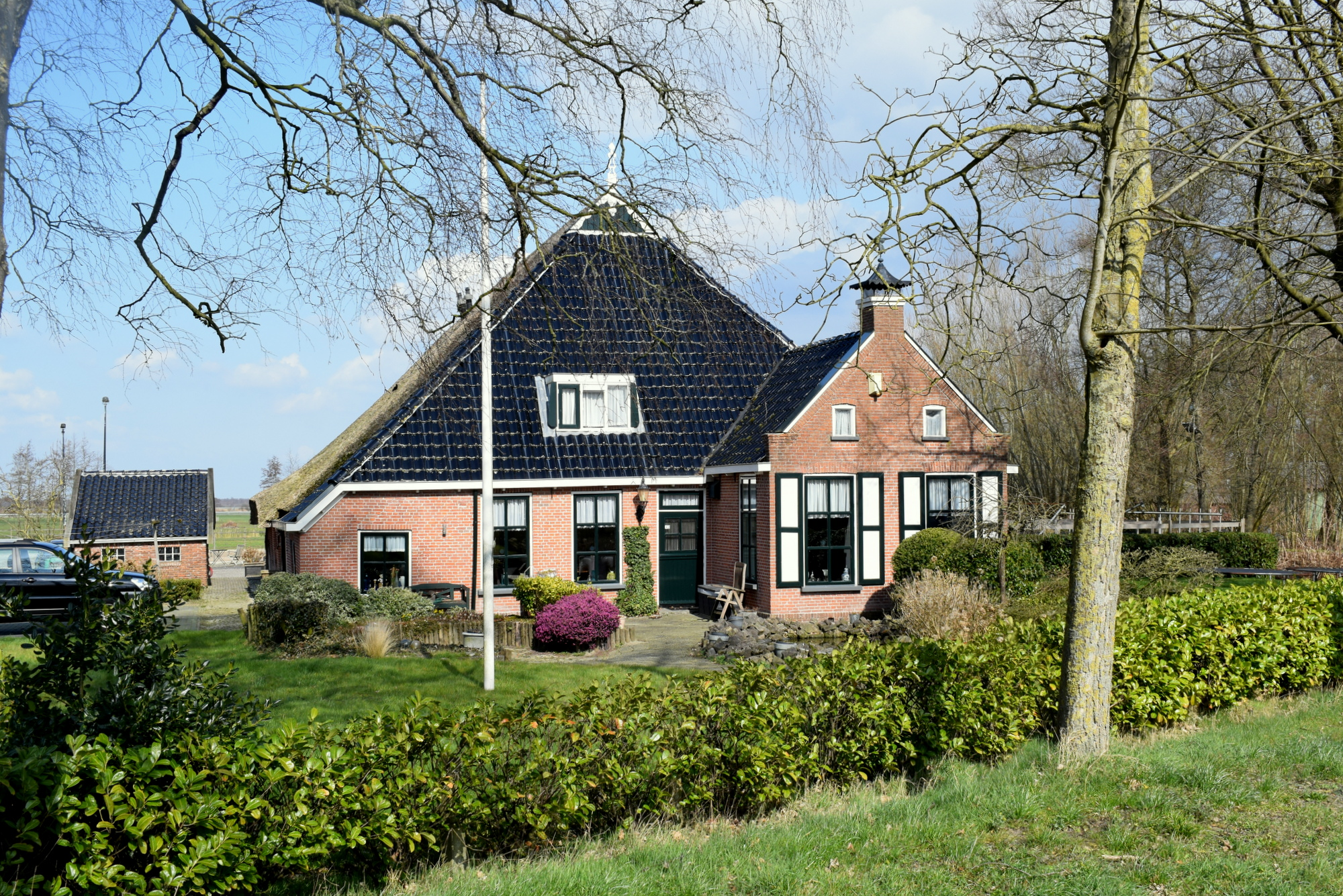
Farm in Hurdegaryp

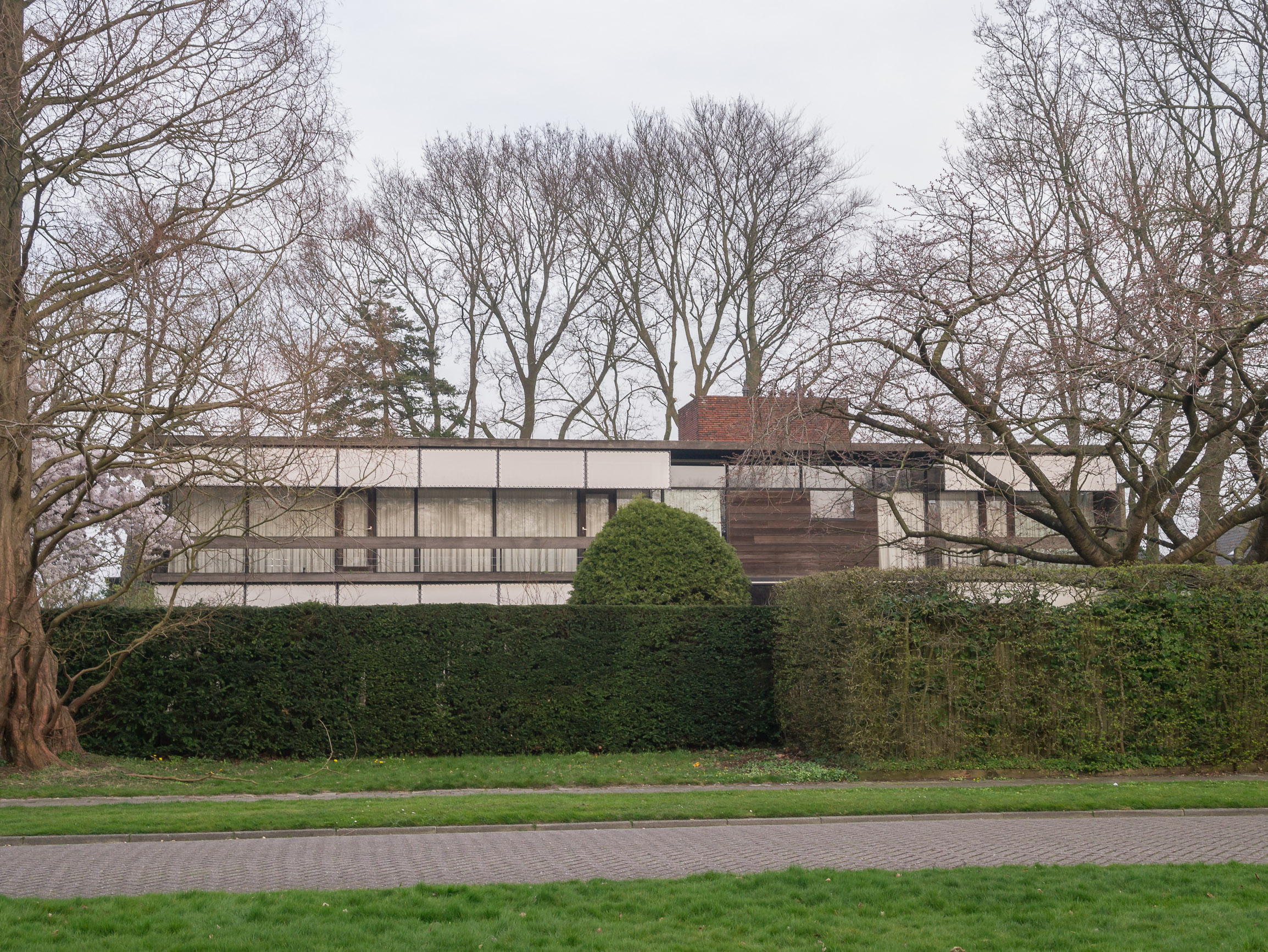
Bungalow in Hurdegaryp

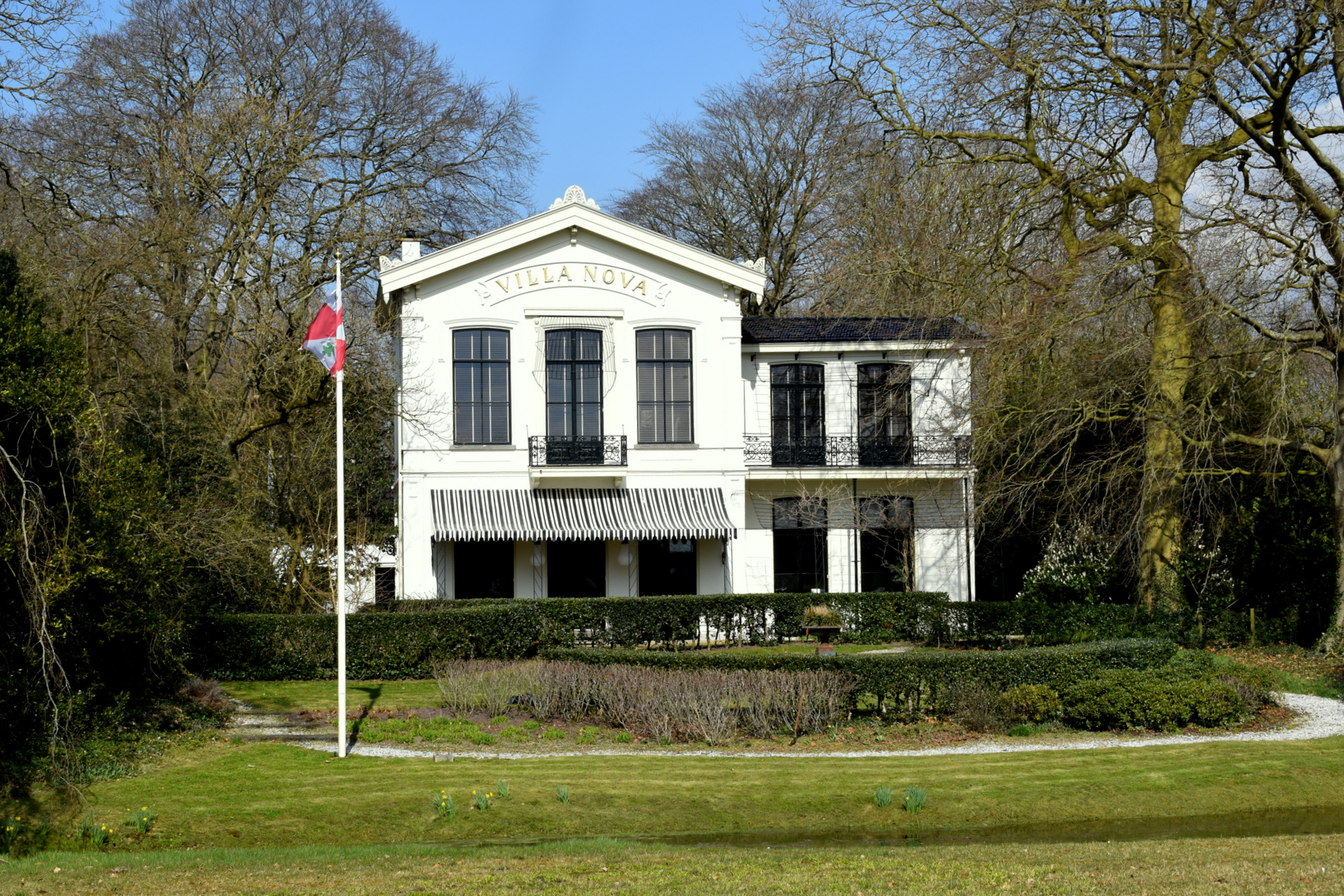
Villa Nova

== See also ==
- Fierljeppen
