= Jellum =

- Village
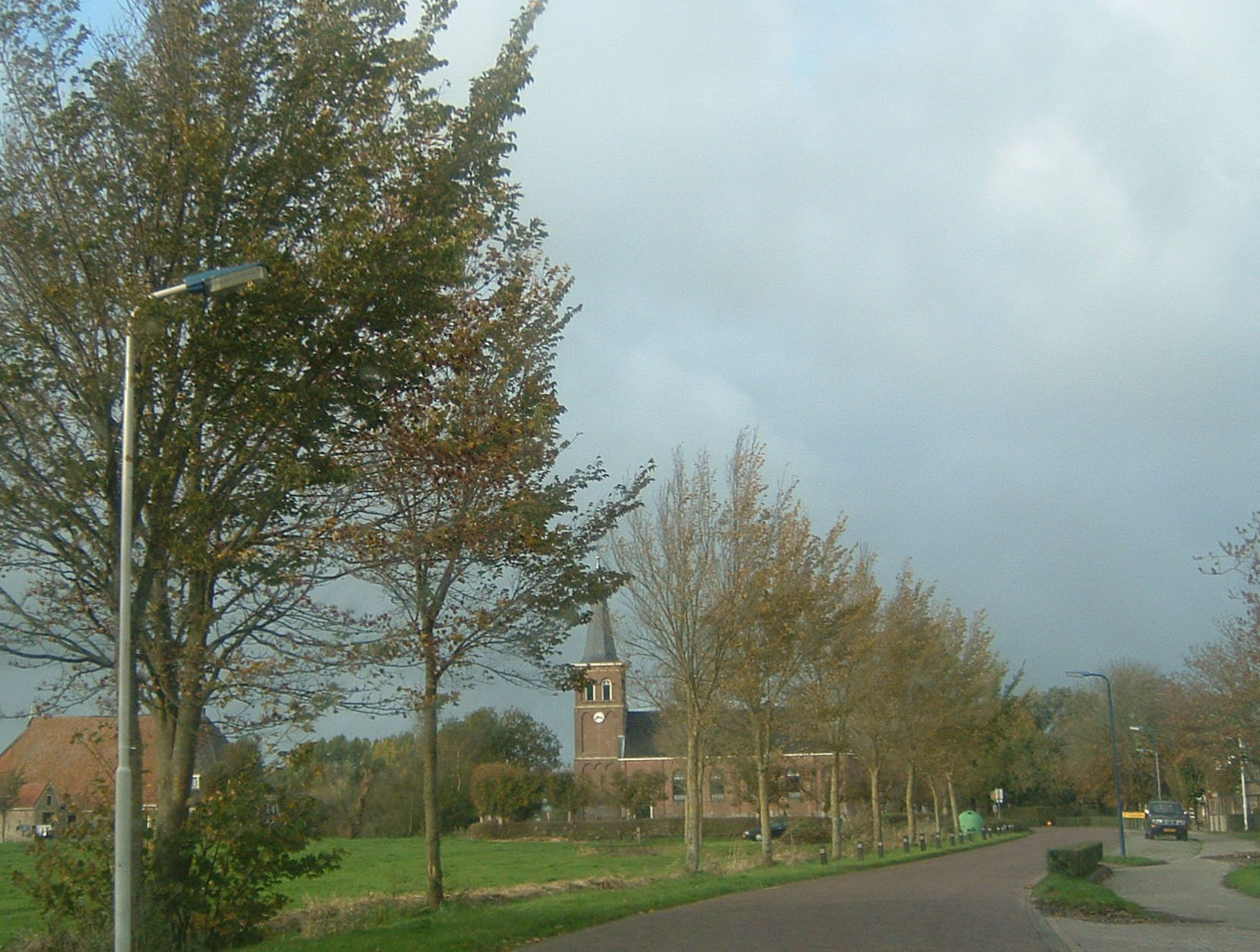

- Flag Coat of arms

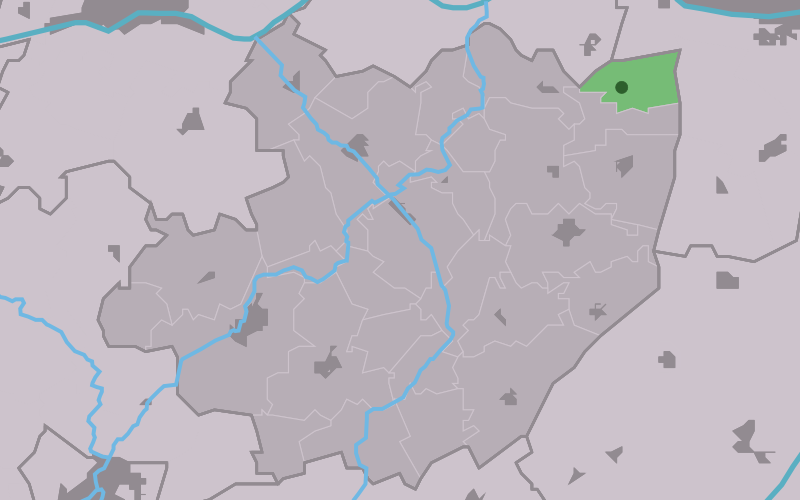
- Location in the former Littenseradiel municipality

- Location in the Netherlands Jellum (Netherlands)
- Country: Netherlands
- Province: Friesland
- Municipality: Leeuwarden

Area
  - Total: 3.25 km^{2} (1.25 sq mi)
- Elevation: 0.9 m (3.0 ft)

Population (2021)
  - Total: 150
  - Density: 46/km^{2} (120/sq mi)
- Time zone: UTC+1 (CET)
  - Summer (DST): UTC+2 (CEST)
- Postal code: 9026
- Dialing code: 058

Jellum is a village in Leeuwarden in the province of Friesland, the Netherlands. It had a population of around 142 in January 2017.

== History ==
The village was first mentioned in the 13th century as Helmum, and means "settlement of the people of Helm (person)". The Dutch Reformed church dated from around 1700. In 1893, it was struck by lightning and both the church and tower burnt down. In 1895, it was rebuilt with a 21 metres (69 ft) tall tower. In 1840, Jellum was home to 96 people.

Before 2018, the village was part of the Littenseradiel municipality and before 1984 it belonged to Baarderadeel municipality.

== Gallery ==
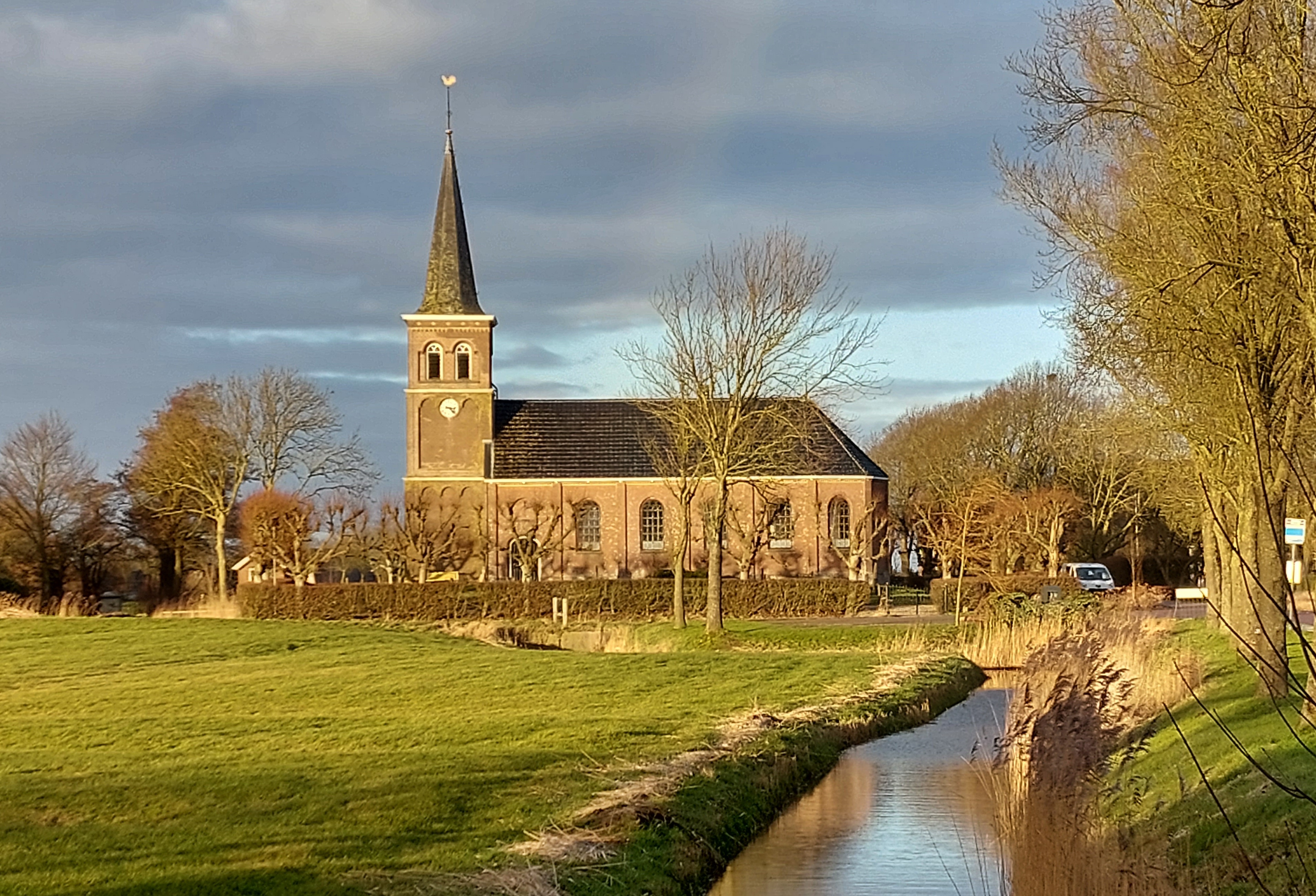
Church of Jellum

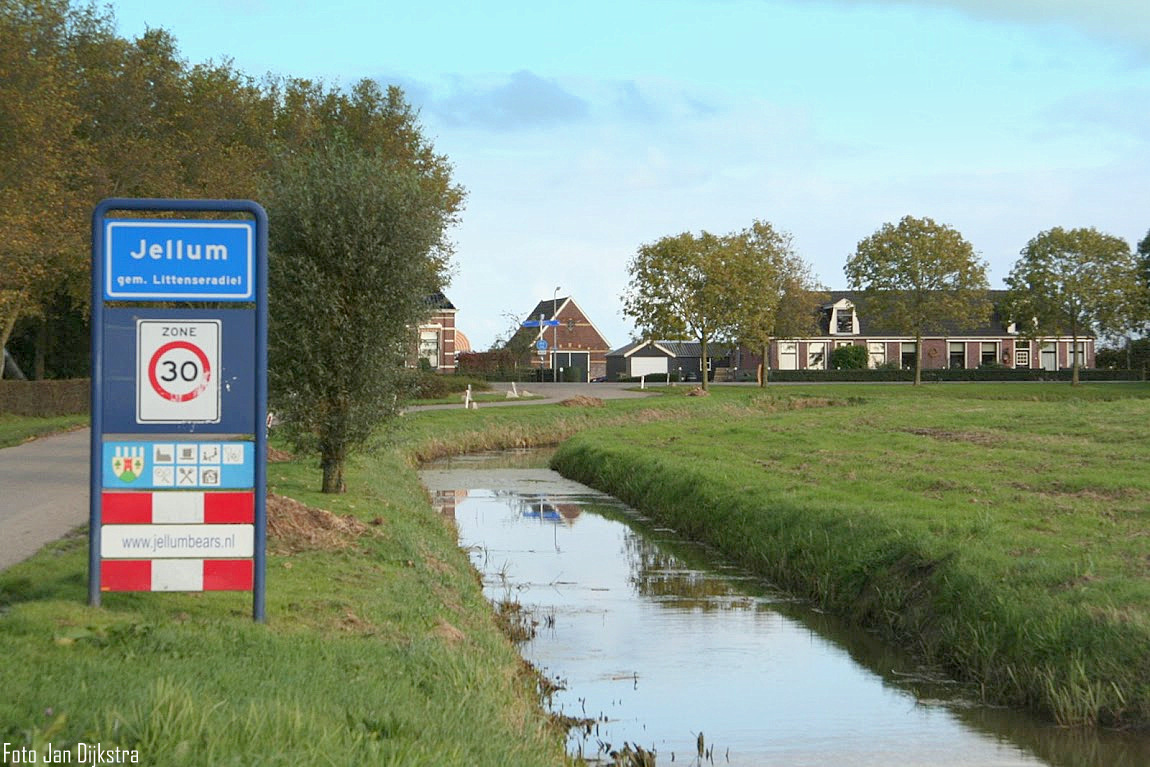
Welcome to Jellum

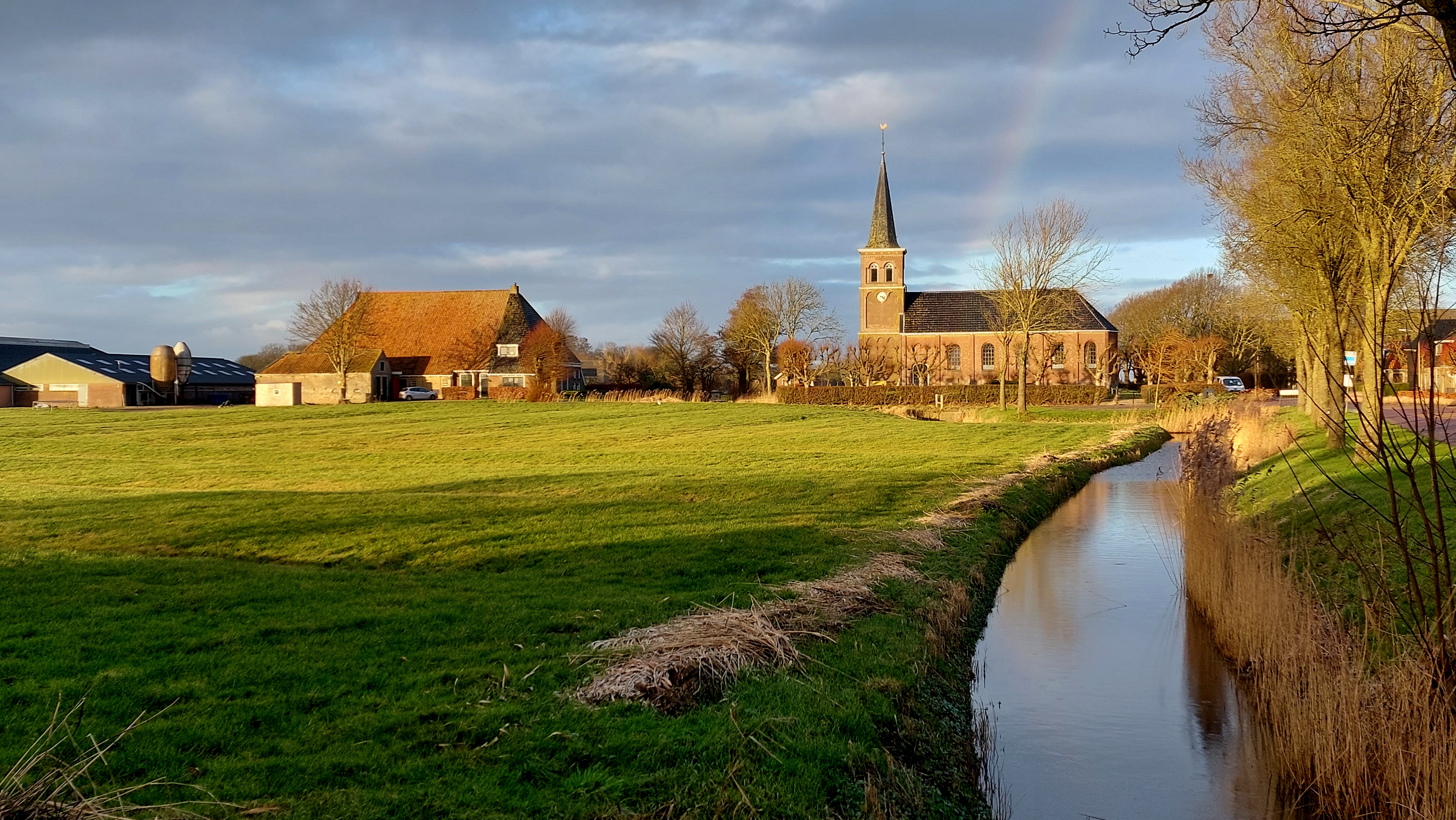
View of Jellum with a rainbow
