= Leeuwarden railway station =

Railway station in Leeuwarden, Netherlands

Leeuwarden
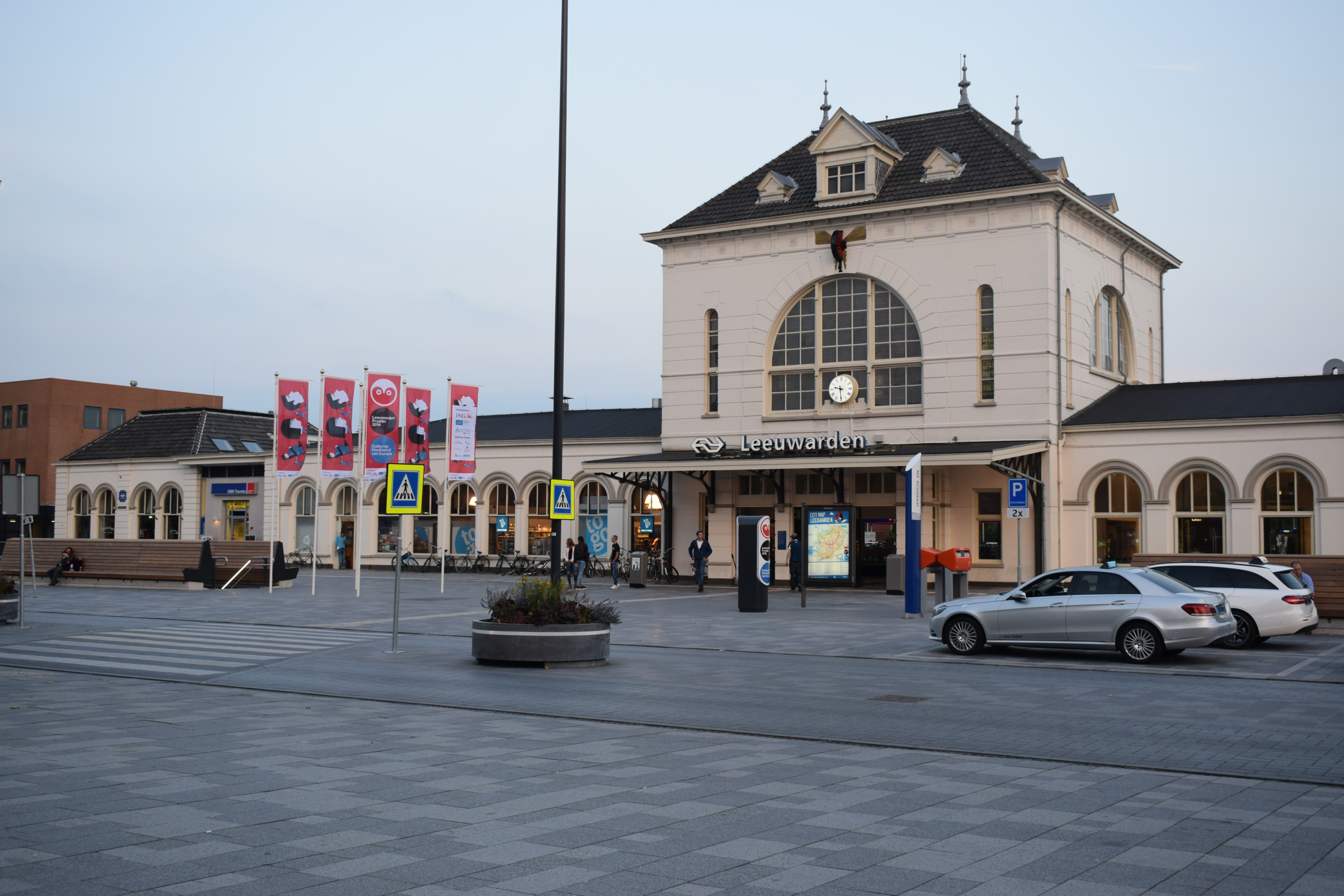
- Railway station in 2018

General information
- Location: Leeuwarden, Friesland, Netherlands
- Coordinates: 53°11′45″N 5°47′28″E
- Lines: Arnhem–Leeuwarden railway Harlingen–Nieuweschans railway Leeuwarden–Stavoren railway Leeuwarden–Groningen railway
- Platforms: 6

History
- Opened: 27 October 1863

Services
Preceding station	Nederlandse Spoorwegen	Following station
Heerenveen towards Den Haag Centraal	NS Intercity 600	Terminus
Heerenveen towards Schiphol Airport	NS Intercity 800	Terminus
Grou-Jirnsum towards Lelystad Centrum	NS Sprinter 9000	Terminus
Preceding station	Arriva Netherlands	Following station
Terminus	Sneltrein 37300	Feanwâlden towards Groningen
Terminus	Stoptrein 37400	Leeuwarden Camminghaburen towards Groningen
Terminus	Stoptrein 37000	Sneek Noord towards Sneek
Terminus	Stoptrein 37100	Mantgum towards Stavoren
Deinum towards Harlingen Haven	Stoptrein 37200	Terminus
Location
- Location within Netherlands

Leeuwarden railway station is the main railway station in Leeuwarden in Friesland, Netherlands. The station, which opened on 27 October 1863, is on the Arnhem–Leeuwarden railway, the Harlingen–Nieuweschans railway and the Leeuwarden–Stavoren railway. Leeuwarden was also the terminus of the North Friesland Railway which served Anjum and Harlingen via Stiens. Behind the station is a stabling point for many trains. The train services are operated by Nederlandse Spoorwegen and Arriva; of the station's six platforms, five are terminating platforms and one is a through platform.

== Train services ==
The following train services call at this station:

Route	Service type	Operator	Notes
Leeuwarden - Grou-Jirnsum - Akkrum - Heerenveen - Wolvega - Steenwijk - Meppel - Zwolle - Kampen Zuid - Dronten - Lelystad Centrum	Local ("Sprinter")	NS	2x hour Monday-Friday daytime. 1x hour evenings and weekends
Leeuwarden - Heerenveen - Steenwijk - Meppel - Zwolle - Lelystad Centrum - Almere Centrum - Amsterdam Zuid - Schiphol Airport	Express ("Intercity")	NS	1x hour
Leeuwarden - Heerenveen - Steenwijk - Meppel - Zwolle - Amersfoort Centraal - Utrecht Centraal - Gouda - Den Haag Centraal	Express ("Intercity")	NS	1x hour
Leeuwarden - Deinum - Dronryp - Franeker - Harlingen - Harlingen Haven	Local ("Stoptrein")	Arriva	2x hour daytime. 1x hour after 21:00.
Leeuwarden - Mantgum - Sneek Noord - Sneek - IJlst - Workum - Hindeloopen - Koudum-Molkwerum - Stavoren	Local ("Stoptrein")	Arriva	1x hour, increasing to 2x hour during peak hours.
Leeuwarden - Mantgum - Sneek Noord - Sneek	Local ("Stoptrein")	Arriva	1x hour. Does not run during peak hours or on Sundays.
Leeuwarden - Sneek Noord - Sneek	Express ("Sneltrein")	Arriva	2x hour towards Leeuwarden in AM peak, and 2x hour towards Sneek in PM peak.
Leeuwarden - Leeuwarden Camminghaburen - Hurdegaryp - Feanwâlden - De Westereen - Buitenpost - Grijpskerk - Zuidhorn - Groningen	Local ("Stoptrein")	Arriva	2x hour. 1x hour after 20:00 and all day on Sundays.
Leeuwarden - Feanwâlden - (Buitenpost - Zuidhorn) - Groningen	Express ("Sneltrein")	Arriva	Mondays-Saturdays overday: 2x hour, alternating between Buitenpost and Zuidhorn. Evenings and Sunday: 1x hour, all trips via Buitenpost.

Preceding station	Disused railways	Following station
Terminus	Noord Friesche Locaalspoorweg-Maatschappij; Stoptrein; North Friesland Railway	Leeuwarden Rijksweg

== Bus services ==
Bus services are operated by Qbuzz.

Line	Route	Operator	Notes
1	Leeuwarden station - Wirdum - Idaerd - Grou	Qbuzz	
2	Leeuwarden station - Leeuwarden Aldlân-Oost	Qbuzz	
3	Leeuwarden station - Leeuwarden Camminghaburen	Qbuzz	
4	Leeuwarden station - Leeuwarden Nijlan	Qbuzz	
5	Leeuwarden station - Goutum - Wergea - Warten	Qbuzz	No evening or sunday service.
6	Leeuwarden station - Leeuwarden Bilgaard	Qbuzz	
7	Leeuwarden station - Leeuwarden Zuiderburen	Qbuzz	
8	Leeuwarden station - Leeuwarden Vrijheidswijk	Qbuzz	
9	Leeuwarden station - Leeuwarden Firda/Wilaarderburen	Qbuzz	No evening, weekend or holiday service.
10	Leeuwarden station - Leeuwarden NHL Stenden	Qbuzz	No service during school holidays and weekends.
11	Leeuwarden station - Leeuwarden Caparis	Qbuzz	1x day, Weekdays only.
13	Leeuwarden - Quatrebras - Noardburgum - Kootstertille - Drogeham - Harkema - Surhuisterveen - Boelenslaan - Houtigehage - Drachtstercompagnie - Drachten	Qbuzz	No Sunday service.
20	Leeuwarden - Garyp - Nijega - Drachten - Beetsterzwaag - Lippenhuizen - Gorredijk - Langezwaag - De Knipe - Heerenveen	Qbuzz	
21	Leeuwarden - Hurdegaryp - Quatrebras - Burgum - Sumar - Drachten	Qbuzz	
51	Leeuwarden - Ryptsjerk - Gytsjerk - Oentsjerk - Aldsjerk - Rinsumageast - Damwâld - Dokkum - Mitselwier - Moarre - Eanjum - Lauwersoog	Qbuzz	Half of daytime trips end in Dokkum. In the evening, all trips terminate in Dokkum.
60	Leeuwarden - Jelsum - Stiens - Hallum - Marrum - Blije - Holwert - Ternaard - Dokkum	Qbuzz	Half of trips end in Holwert.
62	Leeuwarden - Quatrebras - Feanwalden - De Westereen - Kollumerzwaag - Oudwoude - Kollum - Buitenpost	Qbuzz	No evening or Sunday service.
66	Leeuwarden - Hallum - Holwert - Holwert Ferry Terminal	Qbuzz	
70	Leeuwarden - Bitgum - Berlitsum - Sint Annaparochie - Sint Jacobiparochie - Minnertsga	Qbuzz	
71	Leeuwarden - Marsum - Ingelum - Bitgummole - Bitgum - Berltsum - Minnertsga - Tzummarum - Oosterbierum - Sexbierum - Pietersbierum - Wijnaldum - Midlum - Harlingen - Zurich - Kop Afsluitdijk	Qbuzz	Half of weekday trips end in Sexbierum. All weekend trips continue to Kop Afsluitdijk.
72	Leeuwarden - Jelsum - Koarnjum - Britsum - Stiens - Vrouwenparochie - Sint Annaparochie	Qbuzz	No service after 20:00.
73	Leeuwarden - Jelsum - Koarnjum - Britsum - Stiens - Vrouwenparochie - Alde Leie - Oude Bildtzijl	Qbuzz	Weekday peak-hours only.
92	Leeuwarden - Winsum - Wommels - Bolsward - Kop Afsluitdijk	Qbuzz	Half of weekday daytime trips end in Bolsward. All trips on evenings and weekends end in Bolsward.
93	Leeuwarden - Jellum - Weidum - Jorwert - Mantgum - Easterwierrum - Scharnegoutum - Sneek	Qbuzz	Weekdays peak hours only.
95	Leeuwarden - Wijtgaard - Reduzum - Jirnsum - Terherne - Joure - Oudehaske - Heerenveen	Qbuzz	No evening or Sunday service.
97	Leeuwarden - Menaam - Dronryp - Zweins - Franeker	Qbuzz	
151	Leeuwarden - Ryptsjerk - Gytsjerk - Oentsjerk - Aldsjerk - Rinsumageast - Damwâld - Wâlterswâld - Driezum - Dokkum	Qbuzz	Weekday peak hours only.
197	Leeuwarden - Dronryp - Zweins - Franeker - Herbaijum - Midlum - Harlingen	Qbuzz	Weekday peak hours only.
320	Leeuwarden - Drachten - Heerenveen	Qbuzz	Half of weekday trips terminate in Drachten.
350	Leeuwarden - Kop Afsluitdijk - Den Oever - Wieringerwerf - Middenmeer - Nieuwe Niedorp - Heerhugowaard - Alkmaar	Qbuzz	
355	Bolsward - Wommels - Leeuwarden - Dokkum	Qbuzz	On evenings and weekends, this bus only runs between Leeuwarden and Dokkum.
695	Lemmer → Leeuwarden station → Leeuwarden NHL Stenden	Qbuzz	One AM run, towards Leeuwarden NHL Stenden only, Monday-Friday during school period.
771	Leeuwarden - Miedum	Qbuzz	This bus requires reservations at least 1 hour before departure.
772	Leeuwarden - Lekkum	Qbuzz	This bus requires reservations at least 1 hour before departure.
773	Leeuwarden - Bartlehiem	Qbuzz	This bus requires reservations at least 1 hour before departure.
774	Leeuwarden - Warstiens	Qbuzz	This bus requires reservations at least 1 hour before departure.
775	Leeuwarden - Wyns	Qbuzz	This bus requires reservations at least 1 hour before departure.
776	Leeuwarden - Swichum	Qbuzz	This bus requires reservations at least 1 hour before departure.
777	Leeuwarden - Goutum	Qbuzz	This bus requires reservations at least 1 hour before departure.
778	Leeuwarden - Warten	Qbuzz	Weekday evening and Sunday service only. This bus requires reservations at least 1 hour before departure.
779	Leeuwarden - Wergea	Qbuzz	Weekday evening and Sunday service only. This bus requires reservations at least 1 hour before departure.
780	Leeuwarden - Wirdum	Qbuzz	Weekday evening and Sunday service only. This bus requires reservations at least 1 hour before departure.
781	Leeuwarden - Wytgaard	Qbuzz	Weekday evening, 1x Saturday morning, and Sunday service only. This bus requires reservations at least 1 hour before departure.
783	Leeuwarden - Hempens	Qbuzz	This bus requires reservations at least 1 hour before departure.

== Gallery ==
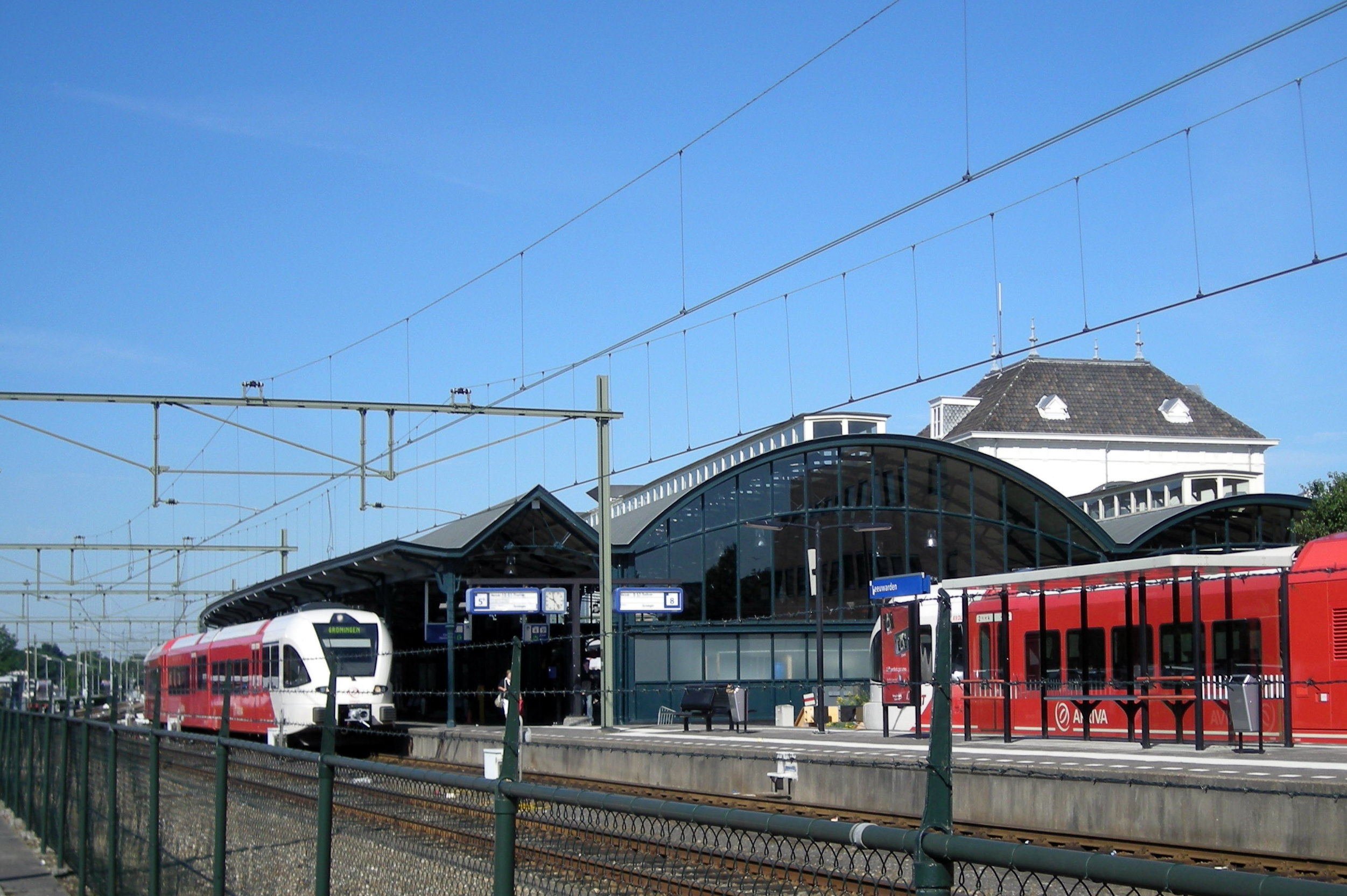
Leeuwarden Station with Spurts

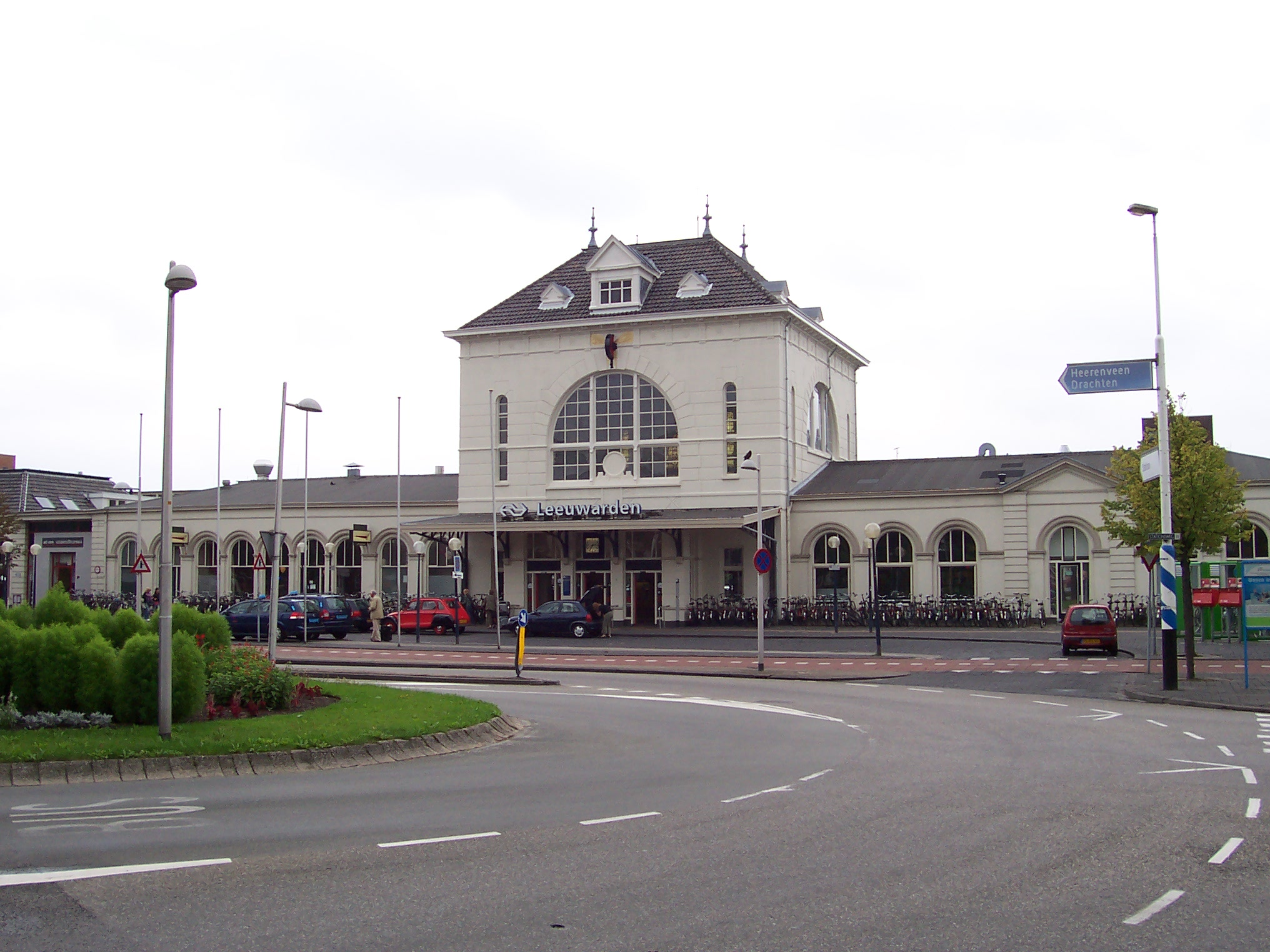
Station in 2006

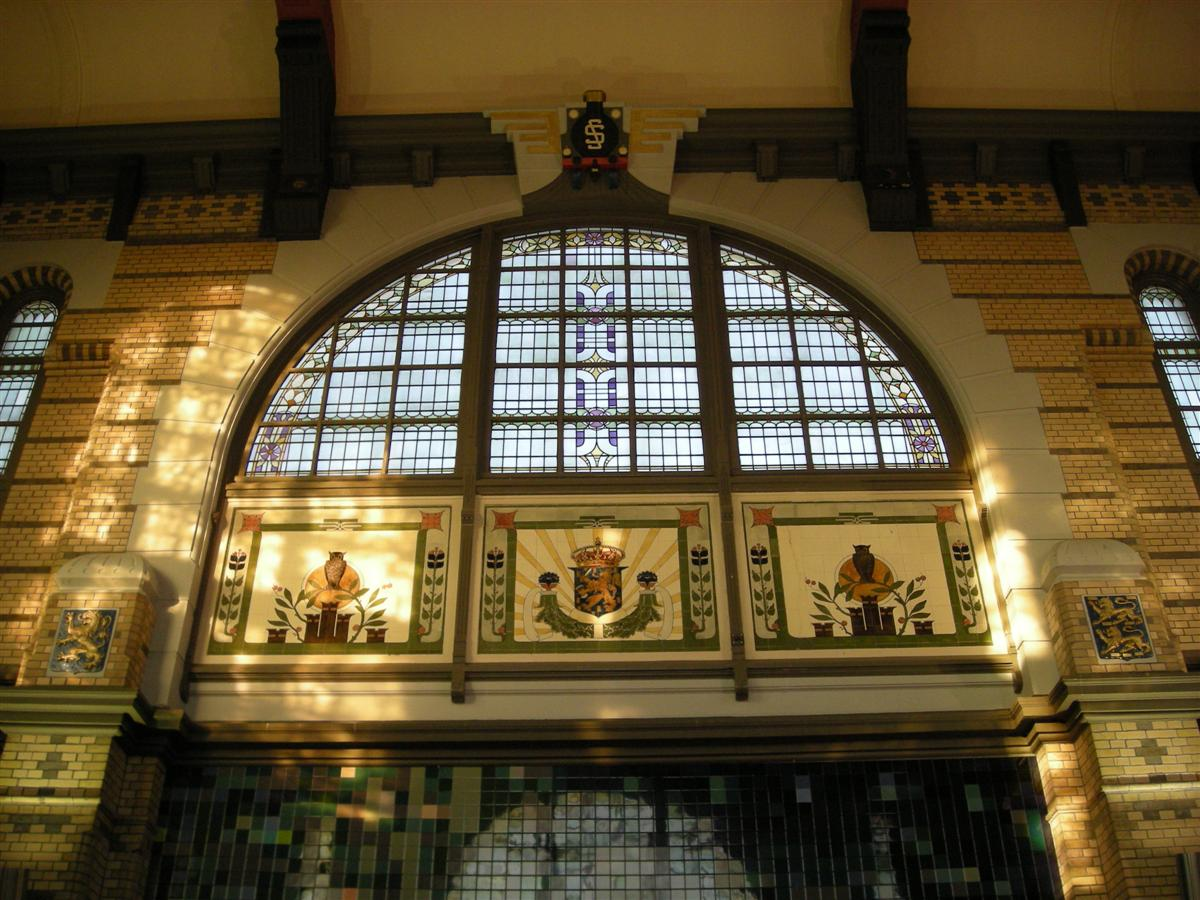
Inside Leeuwarden Station Building

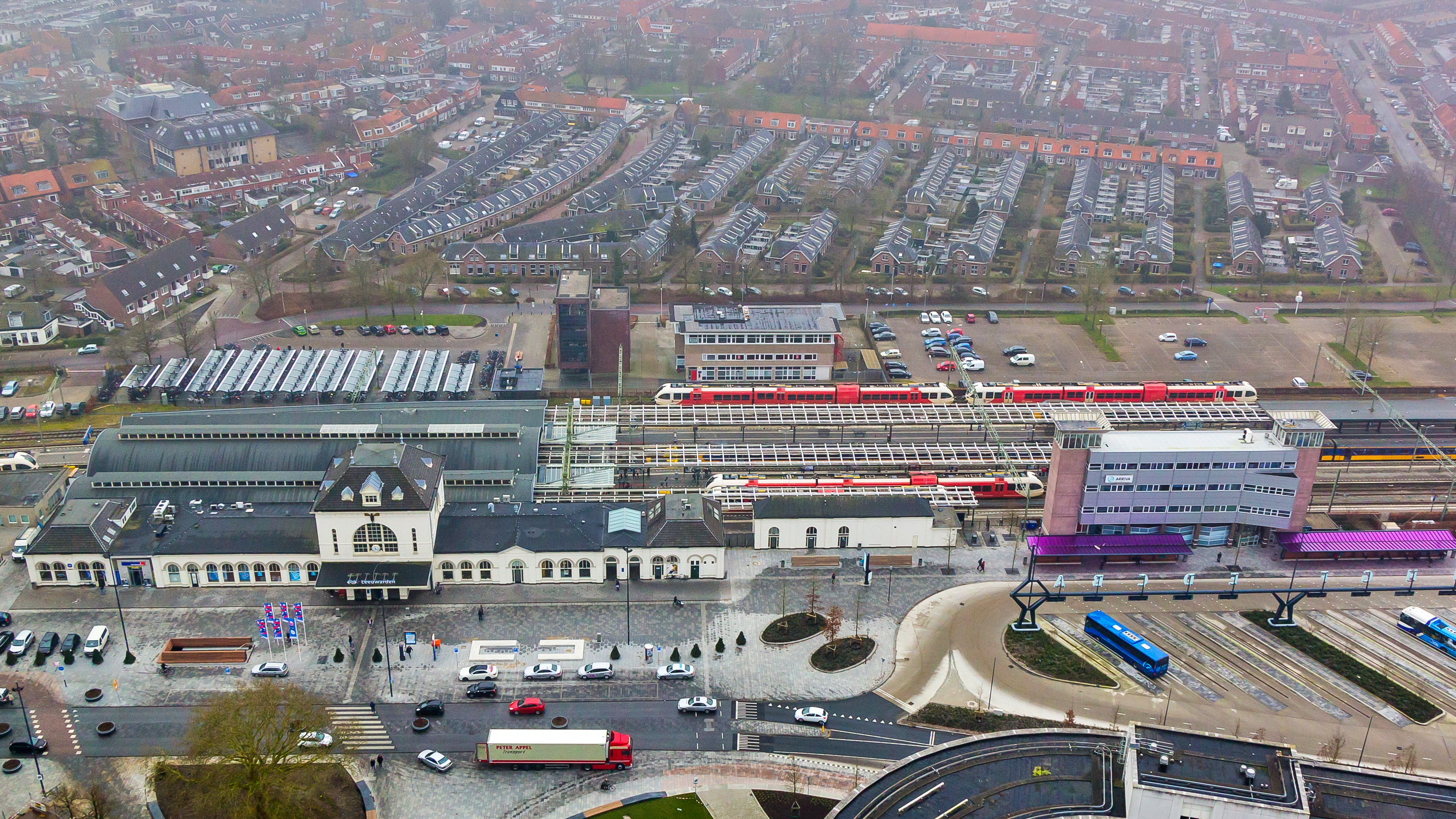
Railway station and bus station in 2018
