= Grou-Jirnsum railway station =

Railway station in the Netherlands

Grou-Jirnsum
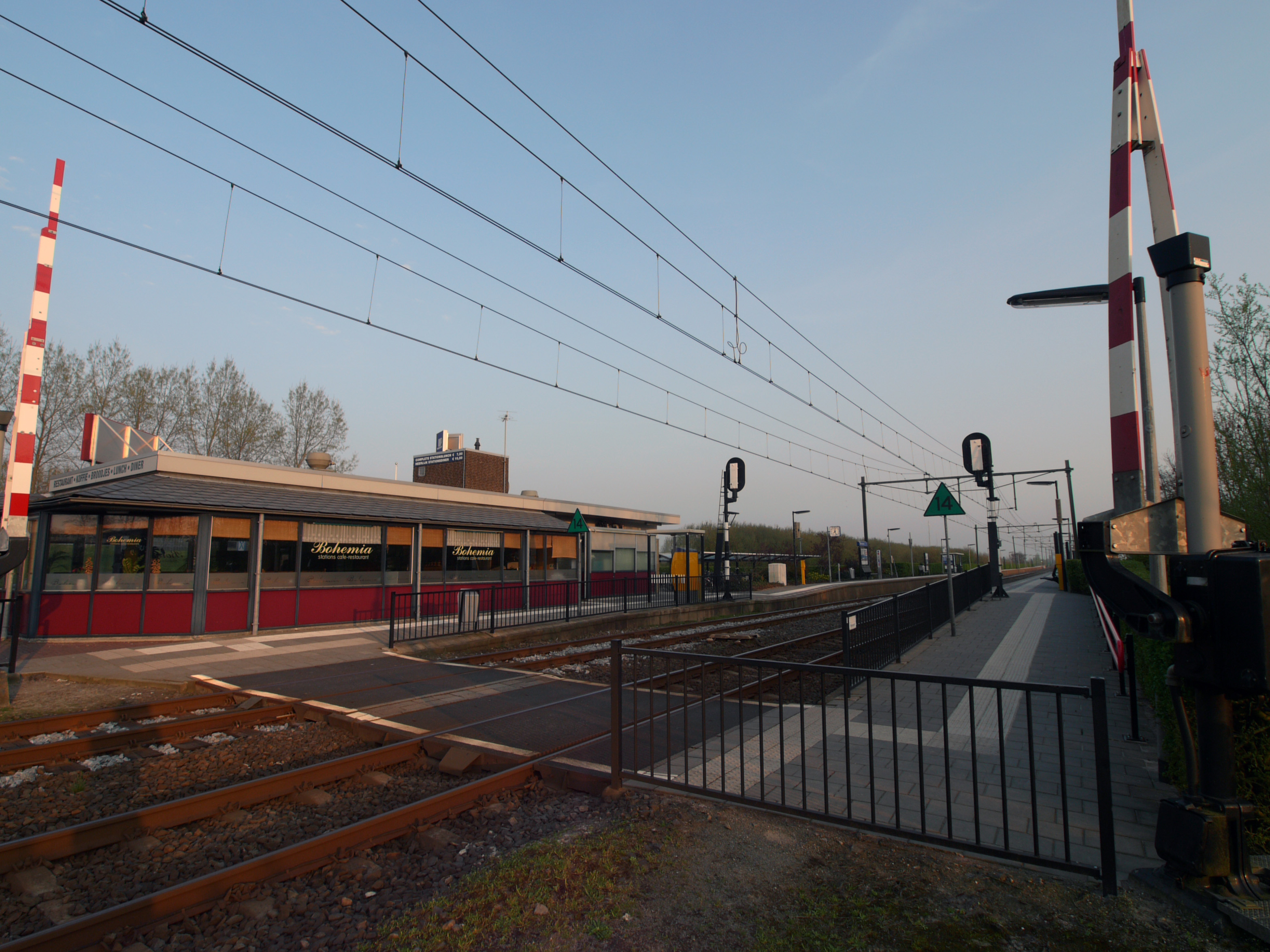

General information
- Location: Netherlands
- Coordinates: 53°05′23″N 5°49′20″E
- Line: Arnhem–Leeuwarden railway
- Platforms: 2 side

History
- Opened: 1 September 1868
- Former names: Grouw-Irnsum

Services
Preceding station	Nederlandse Spoorwegen	Following station
Akkrum towards Lelystad Centrum	NS Sprinter 9000	Leeuwarden Terminus
Location
- Location within Netherlands

Grou-Jirnsum is a railway station located between Grou and Jirnsum, Netherlands. Opened on 1 September 1868, it is located on the Arnhem–Leeuwarden railway. Service are operated by Nederlandse Spoorwegen. Originally named Grouw-Irnsum, it was renamed Grou-Jirnsum on 30 May 1999.

== Train services ==
As of 6 March 2025, the following train services call at this station:

Route	Service type	Operator	Notes
Lelystad Centrum - Dronten - Kampen Zuid - Zwolle - Meppel - Steenwijk - Wolvega - Heerenveen - Akkrum - Grou-Jirnsum - Leeuwarden	Local ("Sprinter")	NS	Mon-Fri during daytime hours 2x per hour - On evenings and Sundays, this train operates 1x per hour

== Bus services ==
Bus services at this station are operated by Qbuzz.

Line	Route	Operator	Notes
28	Grou - Jirnsum - Akkrum - Haskerdijken - Heerenveen	Qbuzz	No evening or weekend service.
831	Grou - Idaerd	Qbuzz	This is an on-request service and only operates if reserved at least 1 hour before departure.
832	Grou - Reduzum	Qbuzz	Evening and weekend service only. This is an on-request service and only operates if reserved at least 1 hour before departure.
833	Grou - Eagum	Qbuzz	This is an on-request service and only operates if reserved at least 1 hour before departure.
834	Grou - Friens	Qbuzz	This is an on-request service and only operates if reserved at least 1 hour before departure.
838	Grou - Jirnsum	Qbuzz	Evening and weekend service only. This is an on-request service and only operates if reserved at least 1 hour before departure.

== See also ==
- List of railway stations in Friesland
