= Akkrum railway station =

Railway station in the Netherlands

Akkrum
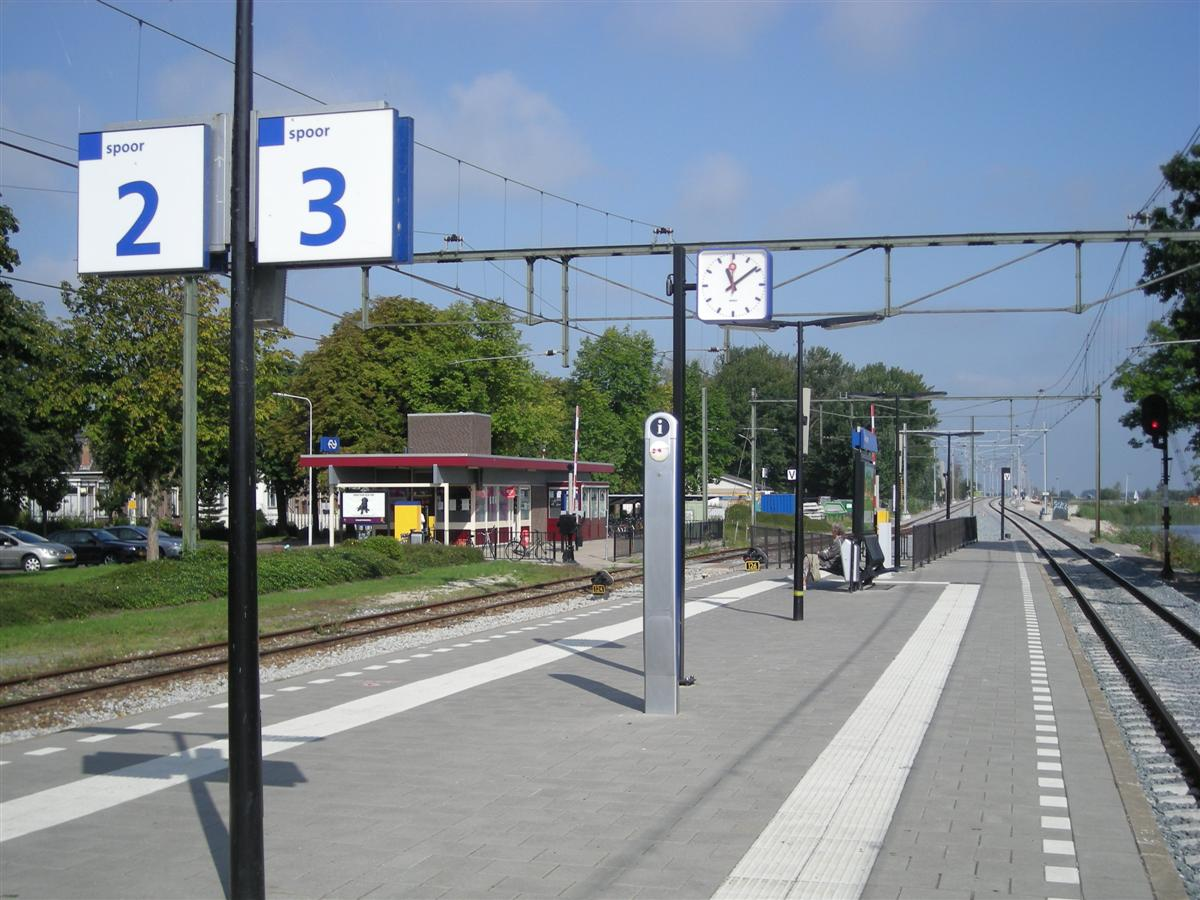

General information
- Location: Netherlands
- Coordinates: 53°2′50″N 5°50′35″E
- Line: Arnhem–Leeuwarden railway

History
- Opened: 1 September 1868

Services
Preceding station	Nederlandse Spoorwegen	Following station
Heerenveen towards Lelystad Centrum	NS Sprinter 9000	Grou-Jirnsum towards Leeuwarden
Location
- Location within Netherlands

Akkrum is a railway station located in Akkrum, Netherlands. The station was opened on 1 September 1868 and is located on the Arnhem–Leeuwarden railway. The services are operated by Nederlandse Spoorwegen.

== Train services ==
Route	Service type	Operator	Notes
Lelystad Centrum - Dronten - Kampen Zuid - Zwolle - Meppel - Steenwijk - Wolvega - Heerenveen - Akkrum - Grou-Jirnsum - Leeuwarden	Local ("Sprinter")	NS	Mon-Fri during daytime hours 2x per hour - On evenings and Sundays, this train operates 1x per hour

== Bus services ==
Bus services at this station are operated by Qbuzz.

Line	Route	Operator	Notes
26	Akkrum - Aldeboarn - Uilesprong - Tijnje - Gorredijk - Lippenhuizen - Jubbega - Oldeberkoop - Zandhuizen - Noordwolde	Qbuzz	Peak hours only, outside of school holidays.
27	Drachten - Beetsterzwaag - Nij Beets - Aldeboarn - Akkrum - Haskerdijken - Heerenveen	Qbuzz	Peak hours only, outside of school holidays.
28	Grou - Jirnsum - Akkrum - Haskerdijken - Heerenveen	Qbuzz	Weekdays only, no evening service.
613	Akkrum - Goëngahuizen	Qbuzz	This bus requires a reservation at least 1 hour before departure.
662	Akkrum - Nij Beets	Qbuzz	No service during peak hours. This bus requires a reservation at least 1 hour before departure.
664	Akkrum - Tijnje	Qbuzz	Weekday evening and weekend service only. This bus requires a reservation at least 1 hour before departure.
665	Akkrum - Aldeboarn	Qbuzz	No service during peak hours. This bus requires a reservation at least 1 hour before departure.
838	Akkrum - Jirnsum	Qbuzz	Weekday evening, one trip on Saturday mornings, and Sundays only. This bus requires a reservation at least 1 hour before departure.
839	Akkrum - Terherne	Qbuzz	Weekday evening, one trip on Saturday mornings, and Sundays only. This bus requires a reservation at least 1 hour before departure.

== See also ==
- List of railway stations in Friesland
