= NS DDZ =

Electric multiple unit

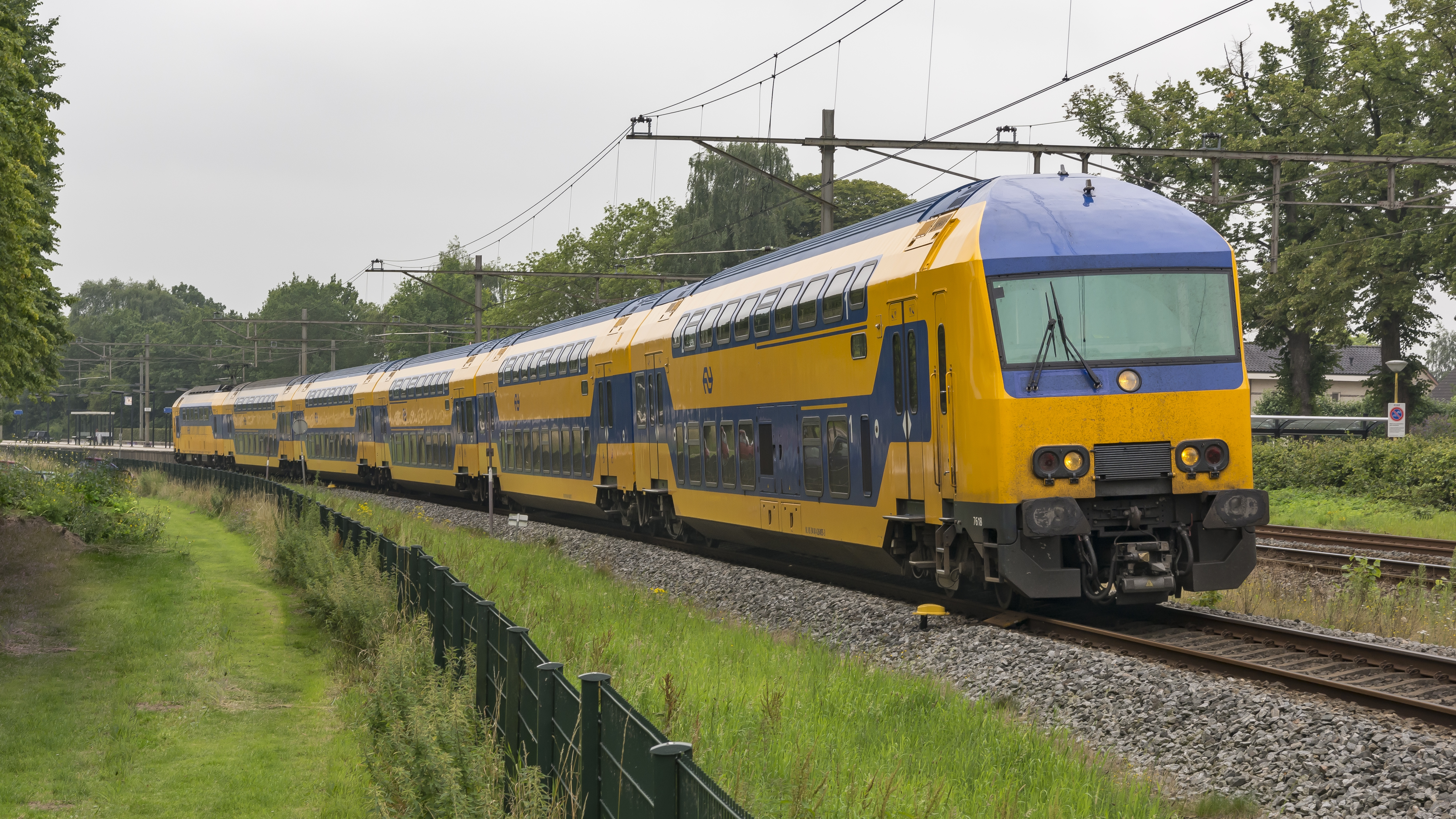
- NS DDZ 7618 in 6-car formation near Zwolle

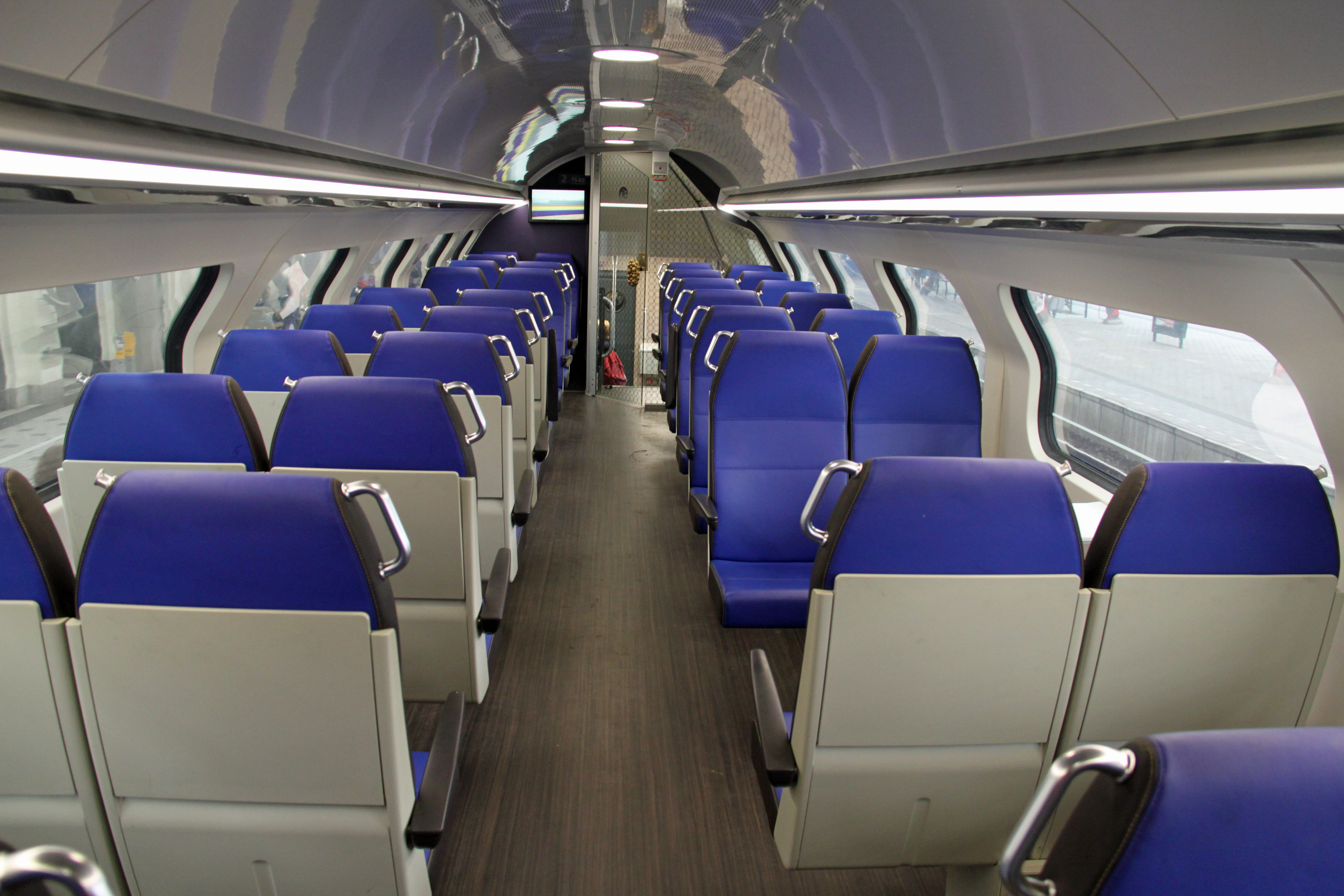
- Refurbished second class interior
- Manufacturers: Waggonfabrik Talbot, De Dietrich Ferroviaire, and Adtranz
- Constructed: 1992–1994; 1997–1998
- Refurbished: 2009–present
- Number built: 50 (mDDM); 79 (Bvs); 103 (Bv); 76 (ABv)
- Formation: Multiple unit: Bvs + ABv + Bv + mDDM (4-car, 448 passengers); ABvs + Bv + ABv + mBs (4-car); ABvs + Bv + ABv + Bv + ABv + mBs (6-car); Push-pull train: Bvs + ABv + Bv + Bv + 1700 (588 passengers)
- Fleet numbers: 270 7001 – 270 7079 (Bvs); 280 7201 – 280 7302; 280 – 7508 (Bv); 380 7501 – 380 7507; 380 7509 – 380 7977 (ABv); 390 7701 – 390 7750 (mDDM)
- Capacity: 120 seated (Bvs); 140 seated (Bv); 124 seated (9ABv); 44 seated (mDDM)
- Operator: Nederlandse Spoorwegen

Specifications
- Car length: 26,890 mm (88 ft 2 5/8 in), Bvs; 26,400 mm (86 ft 7 3/8 in), Bv and ABv; 21,390 mm (70 ft 2 1/8 in), mDDM
- Maximum speed: 140 km/h (87 mph) (service) 160 km/h (99 mph) (design)
- Weight: 76 t (75 long tons; 84 short tons) (mDDM); 46 t (45.3 long tons; 50.7 short tons) (Bv, ABv); 53 t (52 long tons; 58 short tons) (Bvs)
- Traction system: ADtranz GTO-VVVF
- Traction motors: 6× ADtranz 6 FBA 4548A
- Power output: 2,400 kW (3,200 hp)
- Gear ratio: 1 : 4.294
- Electric system: 1.5 kV DC Catenary (mDDM)
- Current collection: Pantograph
- UIC classification: Bo'-Bo'-Bo' (mDDM); 2′2′ (ABv, Bv, Bvs)
- Coupling system: BSI coupling
- Track gauge: 1,435 mm (4 ft 8 1/2 in) standard gauge

NS DDZ (Full name: DubbelDekkerZonering) were built by Waggonfabrik Talbot (later a part of Bombardier, which in turn sold its railway section to Alstom), De Dietrich Ferroviaire (now Alstom DDF) and Adtranz between 1992 and 1998 and are operated in the Netherlands by Nederlandse Spoorwegen (NS). This class is a type of a power concentrated electric multiple unit and was delivered in two batches as DDM-2 and DDM-3. The trailer cars of this multiple unit can also be operated with a Class 1700 electric locomotive instead of a motor car, forming a push-pull train.

The trains were formerly known as NS DD-AR (full name: Dubbeldeksaggloregiomaterieel) From 2009 the NS DD-AR were modernised to transform them from Sprinter to Intercity.

== Types of coaches ==
=== Bvs (270) ===
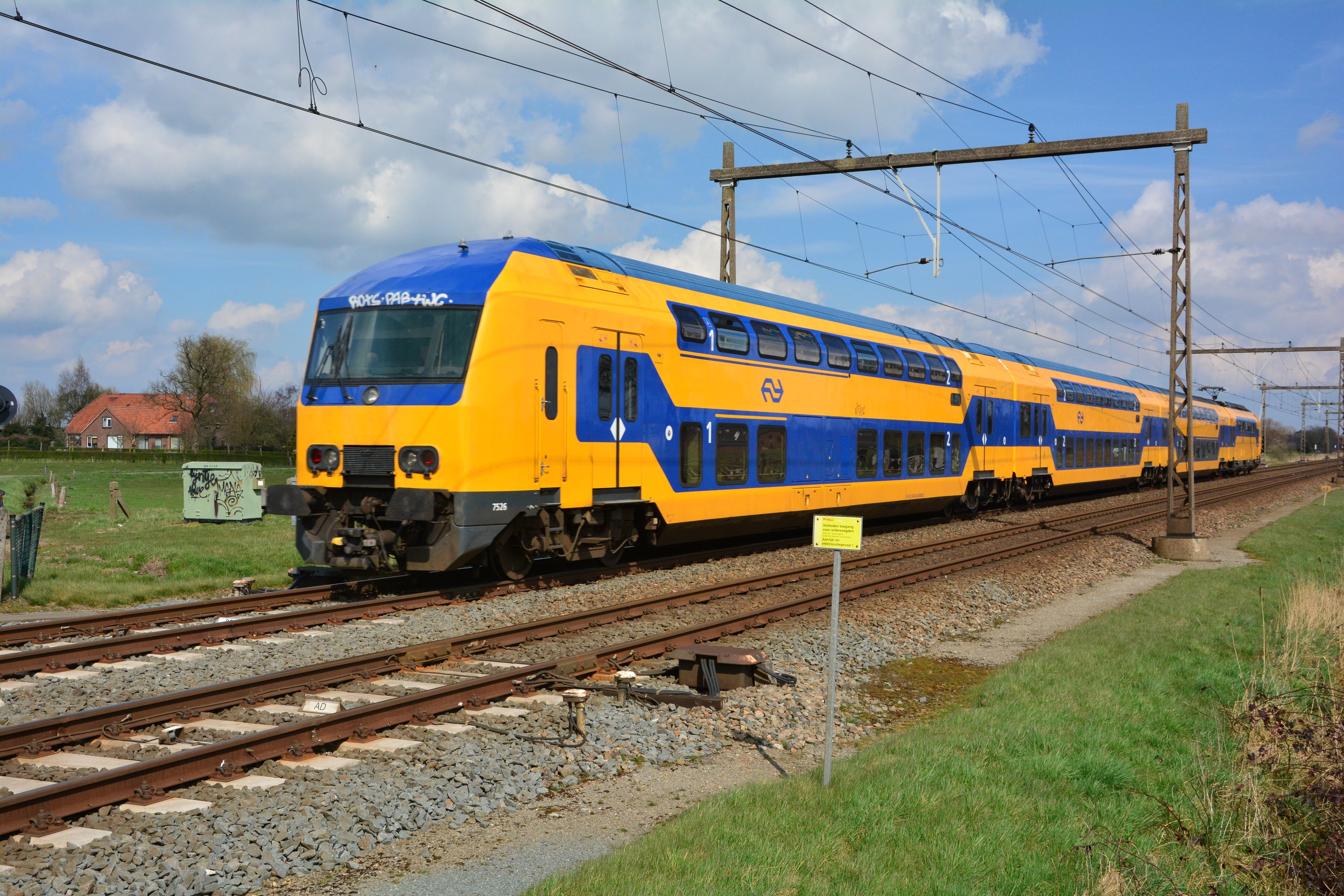
Bvs cab control car or driving trailer

These are the driving trailers at the end of the sets. Each set features them. There are 79 coaches, they are 26.89 metres long and seat entirely second class. They can seat 120 people, 64 on the upper deck, 52 on the lower deck and 4 near the doors. They also feature a toilet. The trains are numbered from 270 7001 to 270 7079.

=== Bv (280) ===
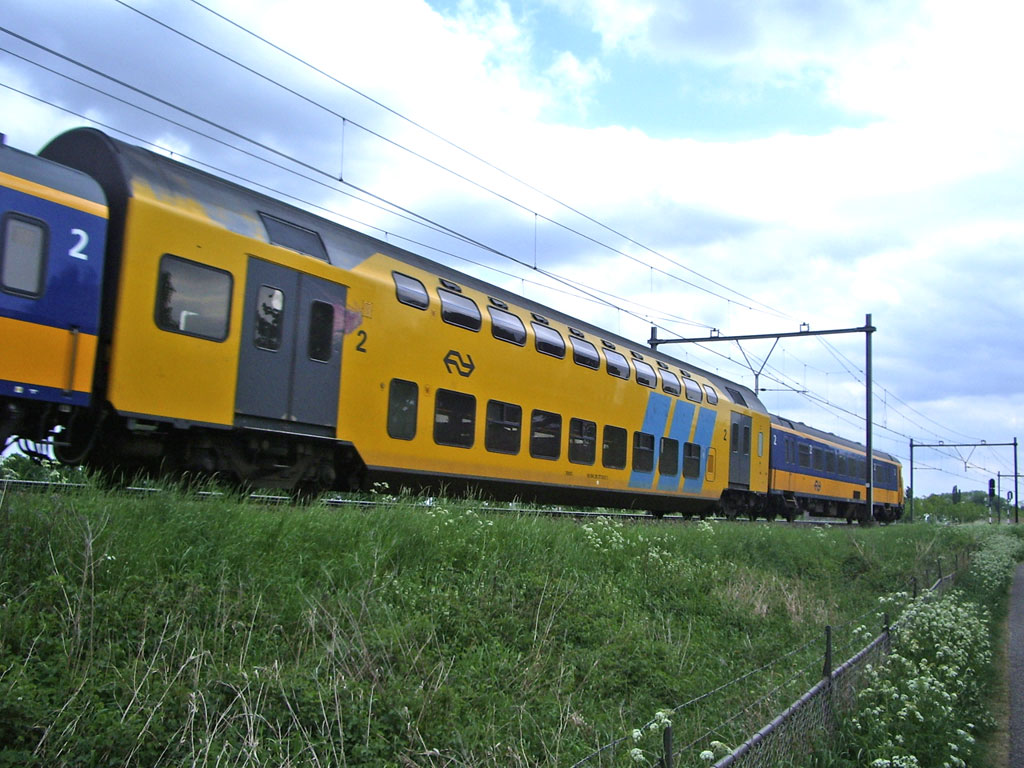
BV coach

These are the coaches connected to the ABv, Bv, mDDM or the locomotive. Each set features them, either one, two or three. One or rarely three if with an mDDM and 2 if with a Class 1700. There are 103 coaches, they are 26.40 metres long and seat entirely second class. They can seat 140 people, 64 on the upper deck, 64 on the lower deck and 12 near the doors. The trains are numbered from 280 7201 to 280 7302, 280 7508.

280 7508, which was converted from first and second class to second class only seats 124, it was previously numbered 380 7508.

=== ABv (380) ===
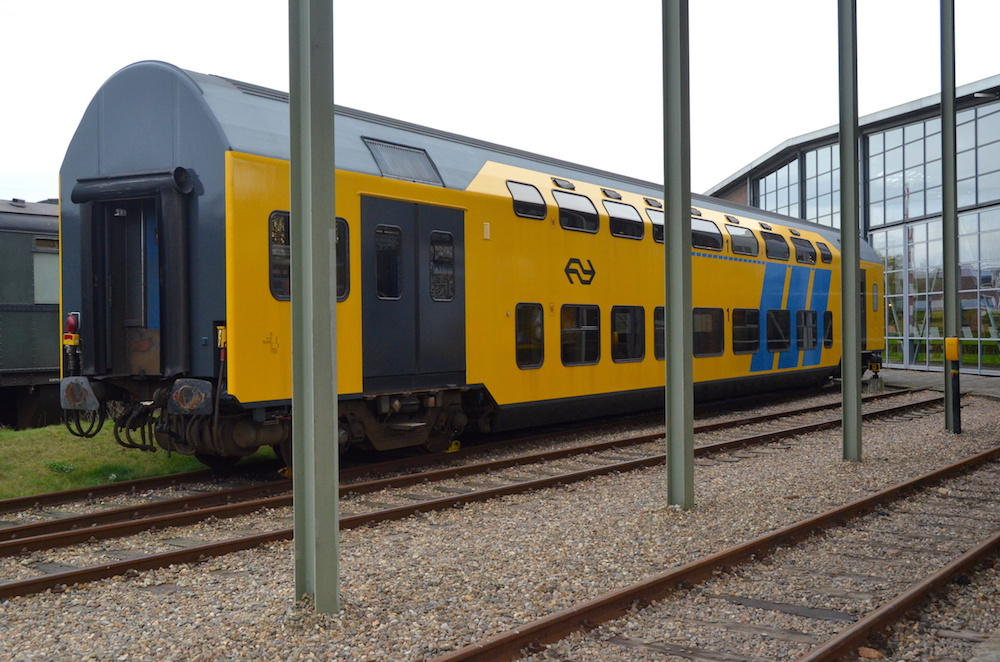
ABv coach

These are the coaches connected to the Bv and Bvs. All sets feature one. There are 76 coaches, they are 26.40 metres long and seat both first and second class. They have 64 first class seats and 60 second class seats, for a total of 124 seats, 56 on the upper deck, 56 on the lower deck and 12 near the doors. The first and second class seating is the same on both decks, 32 first and 24 second.

The trains are numbered from 380 7501 to 380 7507, and from 380 7509 to 380 7577.

=== mDDM (390) ===
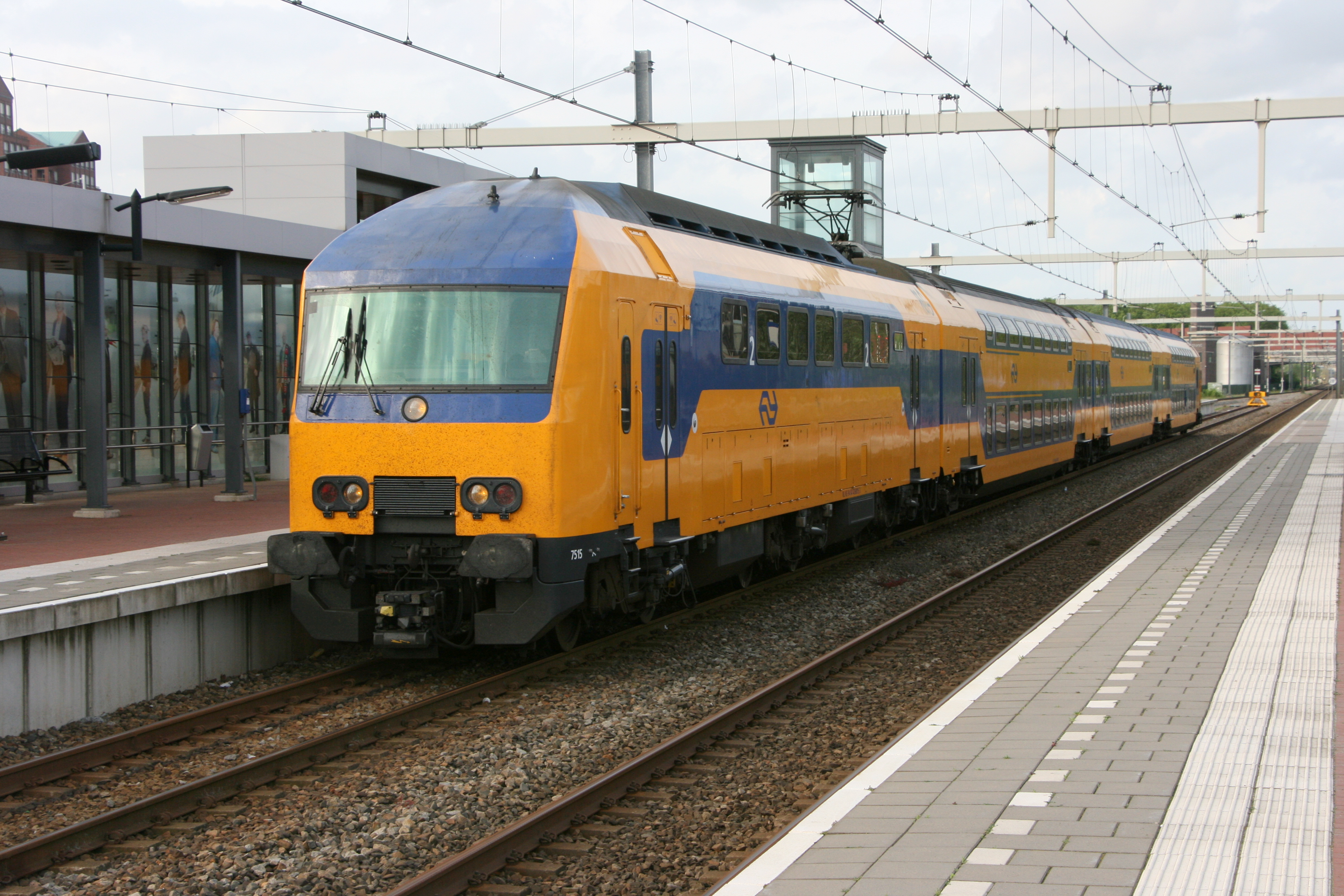
mDDM motor coach (note the lack of lower deck seating)

These are the driving motor coaches connected to the Bv. Only 50 sets feature one. mDDMs are 21.39 metres long and seat both first and second class. There are 16 first class seats and 48 second class seats. They can seat 64 people, all on the upper deck, slightly lower than in the other coaches. There are no lower deck seats, as this is where all the electrical equipment is kept. Units with an mDDM are not in service as DD-ARs anymore, as they have been refurbished into DDZs.

They are numbered from 390 7701 to 390 7750.

== Formations ==
- A multiple unit set made up of Bvs + ABv + Bv + mDDM can seat 448. This formation has a set number of 78xx and the last two digits are the same as the last two on the Bvs of the set.

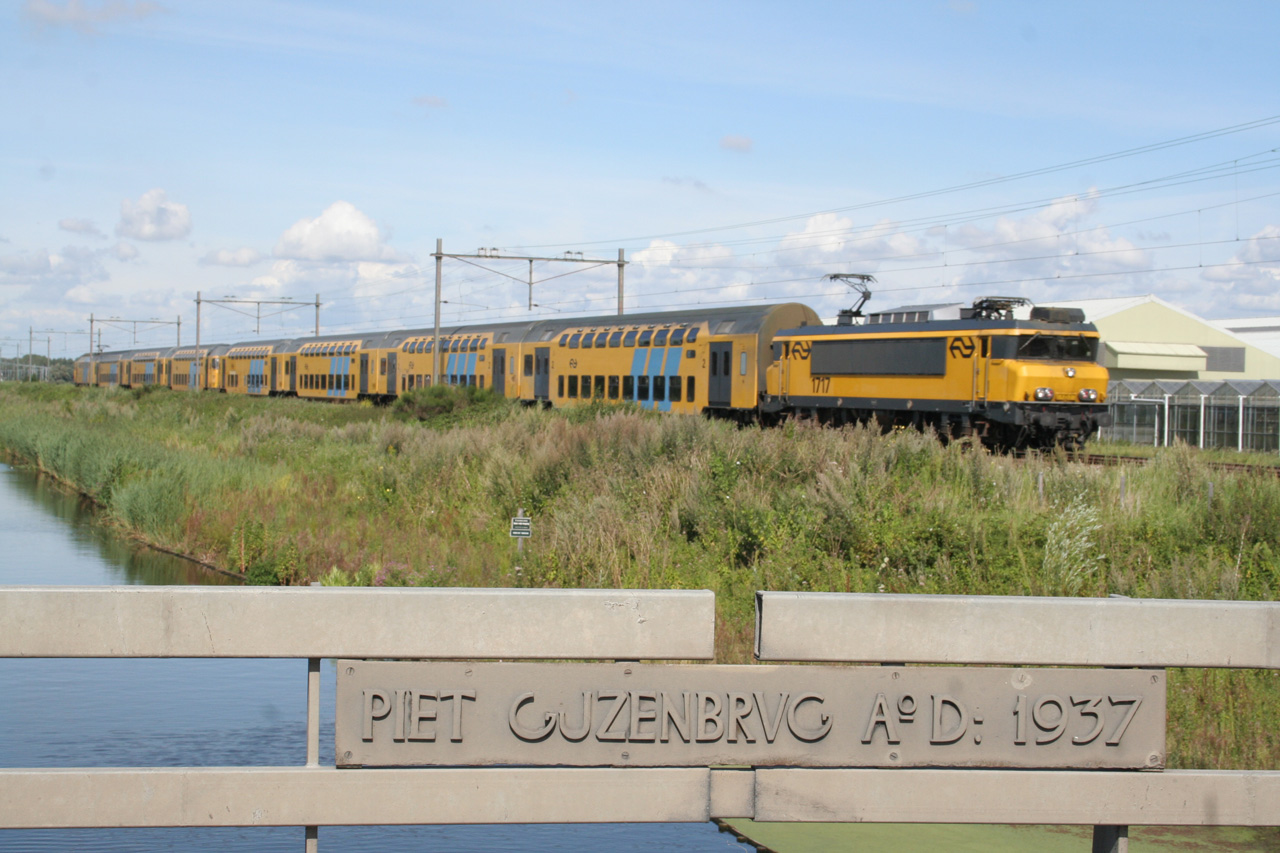
Pre-refurbished Bvs + ABv + Bv + Bv + 1700 formation with another set with an mDDM between Haarlem and Leiden, Netherlands.

- A push-pull train set made up of Bvs + ABv + Bv + Bv + 1700 locomotive can seat 588. This formation has a set number of 74xx and the last two digits are the same as the last two on the Bvs of the set.

== Modernisation from DD-AR to DDZ (NID) ==
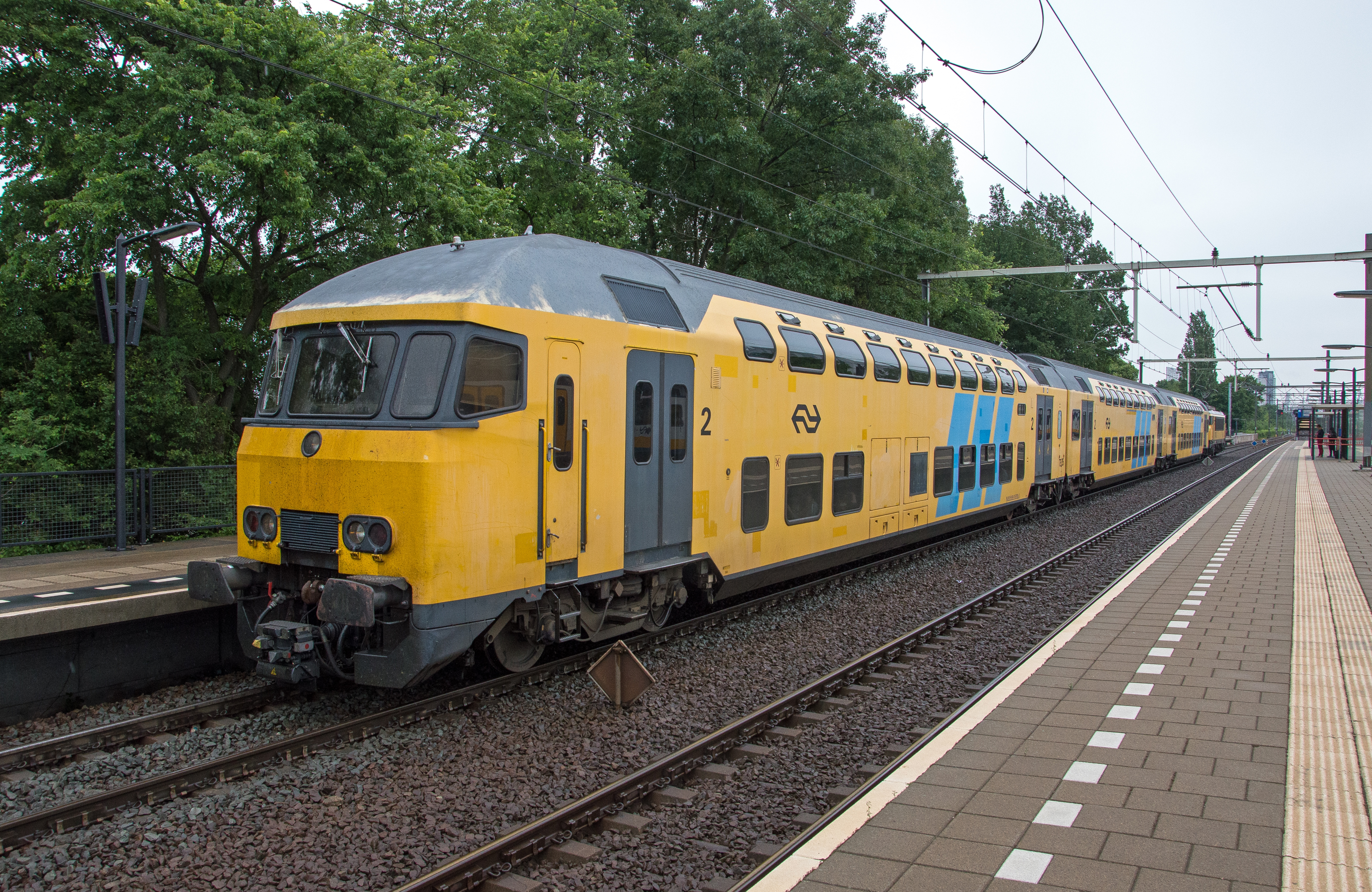
DD-AR set prior to refurbishment

In 2009 NedTrain started to modernise 240, including the 50 mDDM coaches, out of 308 coaches of the DD-AR rolling stock. The other 68 coaches were intended to be taken out of service and sold or scrapped.

The modernisation transformed the coaches to modern Intercity trains.

The new name of the DD-AR is NID, which stands for Nieuwe Intercity Dubbeldekker ("New Intercity Double decker") and ride under the new DDZ (DubbelDekkerZonering) code. The upper decks will be quiet, meant for working purposes whereas the lower decks will be for fun and enjoyment. The 240 modernised coaches will form 30 EMUs consisting of ABvs + Bv + ABv + mBs (mBs = mDDM) and 20 EMUs consisting of ABvs + Bv + ABv + Bv + ABv + mBs; so a total of 50 EMUs will be formed.

The first new EMU came into service in 2012, the last EMU in 2014. After the modernisation of the DD-ARs, the oldest 1700 series locomotives (from 1701 to 1729) are no longer used, since all new NID trains have a mDDM powercar.

The trains went temporarily out of service on December 3, 2020, due to unexplainable shaking and noise at speeds from about 100 km/h. The cause of the shaking and noise was discovered to be worn wheels from the train's braking system; specifically, the brake pads were causing the wheels to wear unevenly and too quickly. The maintenance schedule of the trains was adjusted, and real-time monitor systems were added to determine if the trains require extra or earlier maintenance. The trains are expected to be slowly phased back into regular use beginning on December 6, 2021.

== Reactivation ==
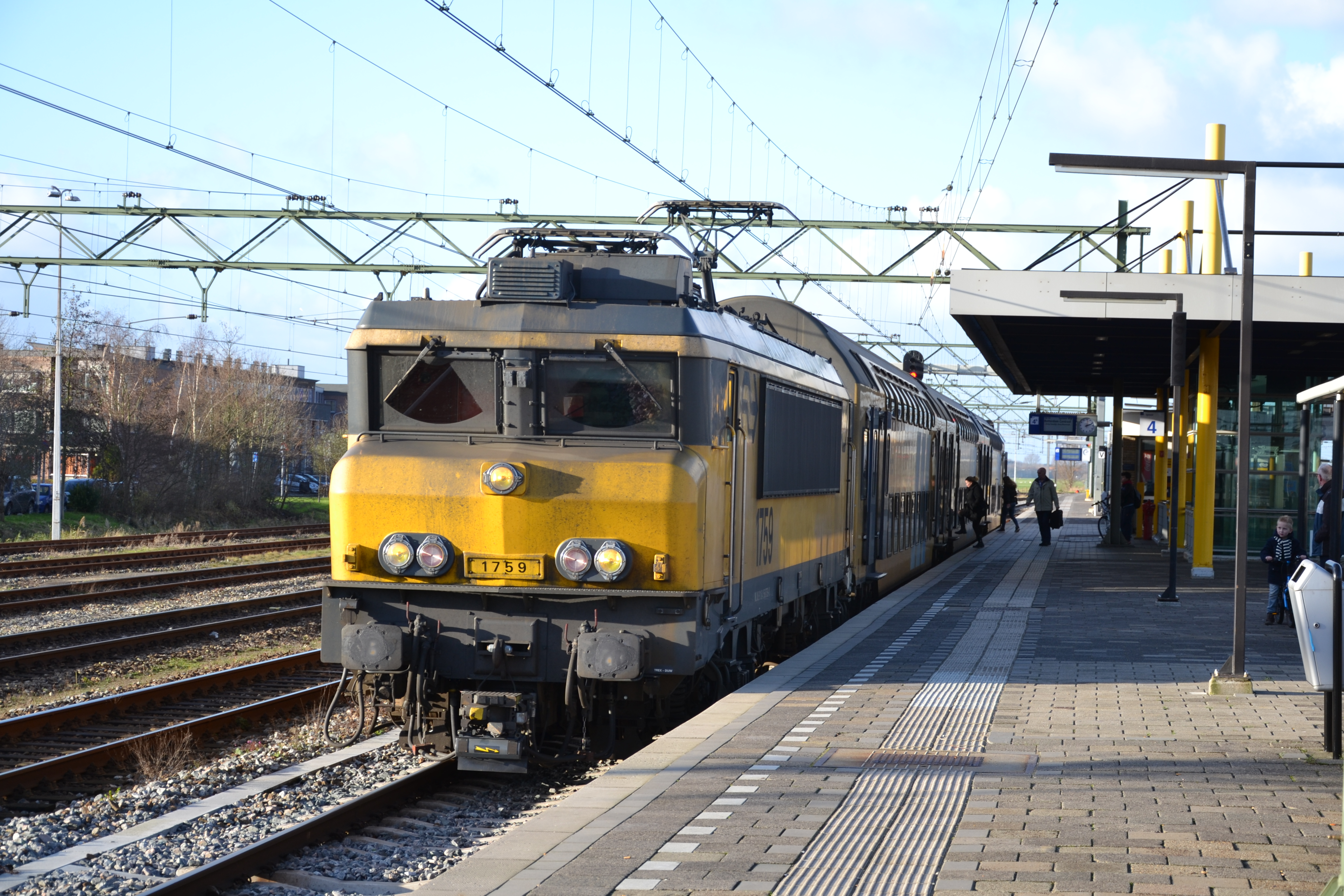
Reactivated set in Uitgeest in North Holland, Netherlands

In November 2013, NS decided to reactivate the remaining DDARs. Due to problems concerning the HSL, there would have been a shortage of trains. Thus, 19 new compositions of DDAR-coaches were formed, consisting of 3 coaches and a 1700 locomotive. The first of which entered service in December 2014. Each of the 19 compositions received minor refurbishments in Haarlem.

== Services operated ==
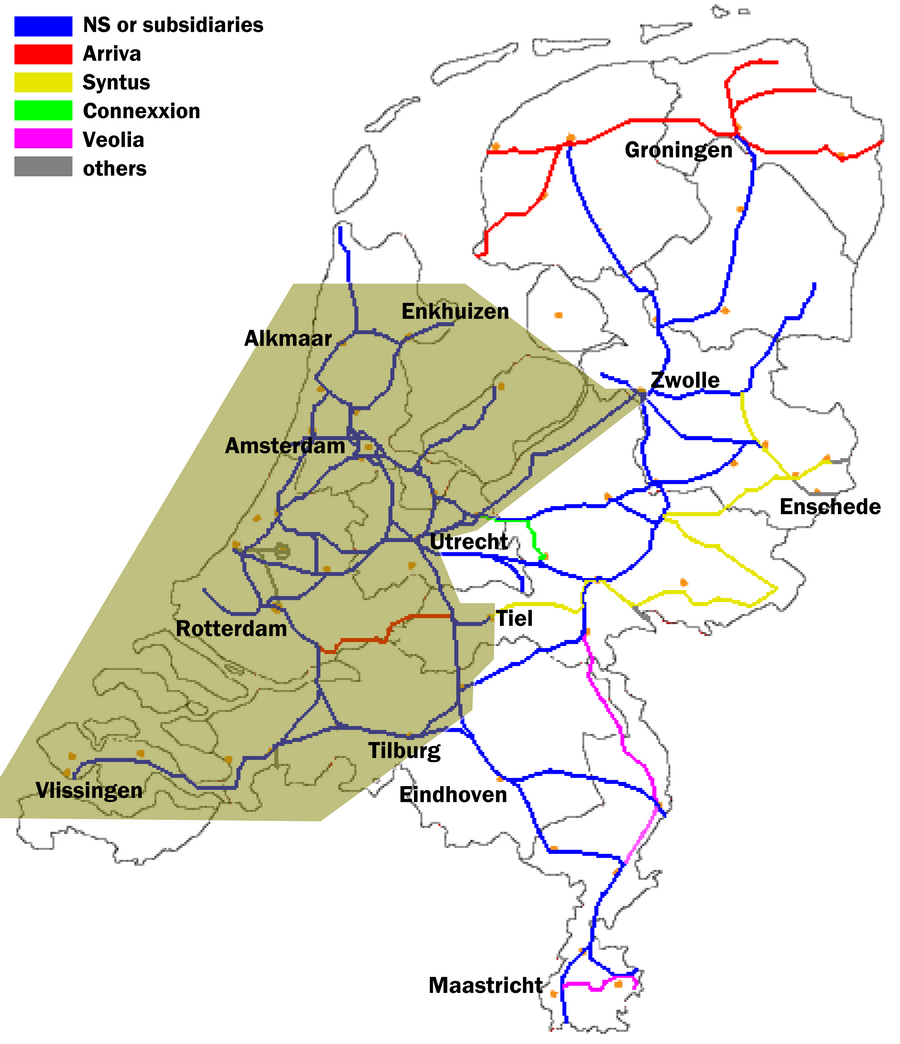
DD-AR operating area before modernisation

The DDZs are regularly used on these services in the current timetable (2018). They can sometimes appear on other services.

Series	Type	Route	Material	Notes
500	Intercity	Rotterdam Centraal – Rotterdam Alexander – Gouda – Utrecht Centraal – Amersfoort – Zwolle – Assen – Groningen	DDZ, ICM	
600	Intercity	Rotterdam Centraal – Rotterdam Alexander – Gouda – Utrecht Centraal – Amersfoort – Zwolle – Meppel – Steenwijk – Heerenveen – Leeuwarden	DDZ, ICM	
700	Intercity	Den Haag Centraal – Leiden Centraal – Schiphol Airport – Amsterdam Zuid - Almere Centrum – Lelystad Centrum - Zwolle – Assen – Groningen	DDZ, ICM	
1400	Nachtnet	Utrecht Centraal – Amsterdam Centraal – Schiphol – Leiden Centraal – Den Haag HS – Delft – Rotterdam Centraal	DDZ, ICM, VIRM	
1800	Intercity	Den Haag Centraal – Leiden Centraal – Schiphol Airport – Amsterdam Zuid - Almere Centrum – Lelystad Centrum - Zwolle – Meppel – Steenwijk – Heerenveen – Leeuwarden	DDZ, ICM	
2000	Intercity	Den Haag Centraal – Gouda – Utrecht Centraal	DDZ, ICM	
2800	Intercity	Rotterdam Centraal – Rotterdam Alexander – Gouda – Utrecht Centraal	DDZ, VIRM	This train runs only until 9:00 p.m. and Sundays after 11:30 a.m.
3600	Intercity	Roosendaal - Zwolle	DDZ, ICM, VIRM	
5600	Sprinter	Utrecht Centraal – Amersfoort – Zwolle	DDZ	
8800	Intercity	Leiden Centraal – Leiden Lammenschans - Alphen aan den Rijn - Bodegraven - Woerden - Utrecht Centraal	DDZ, ICM	
22400	Nachtnet	Utrecht Centraal – Amersfoort	DDZ	This train only runs on Fridays and Saturday nights.

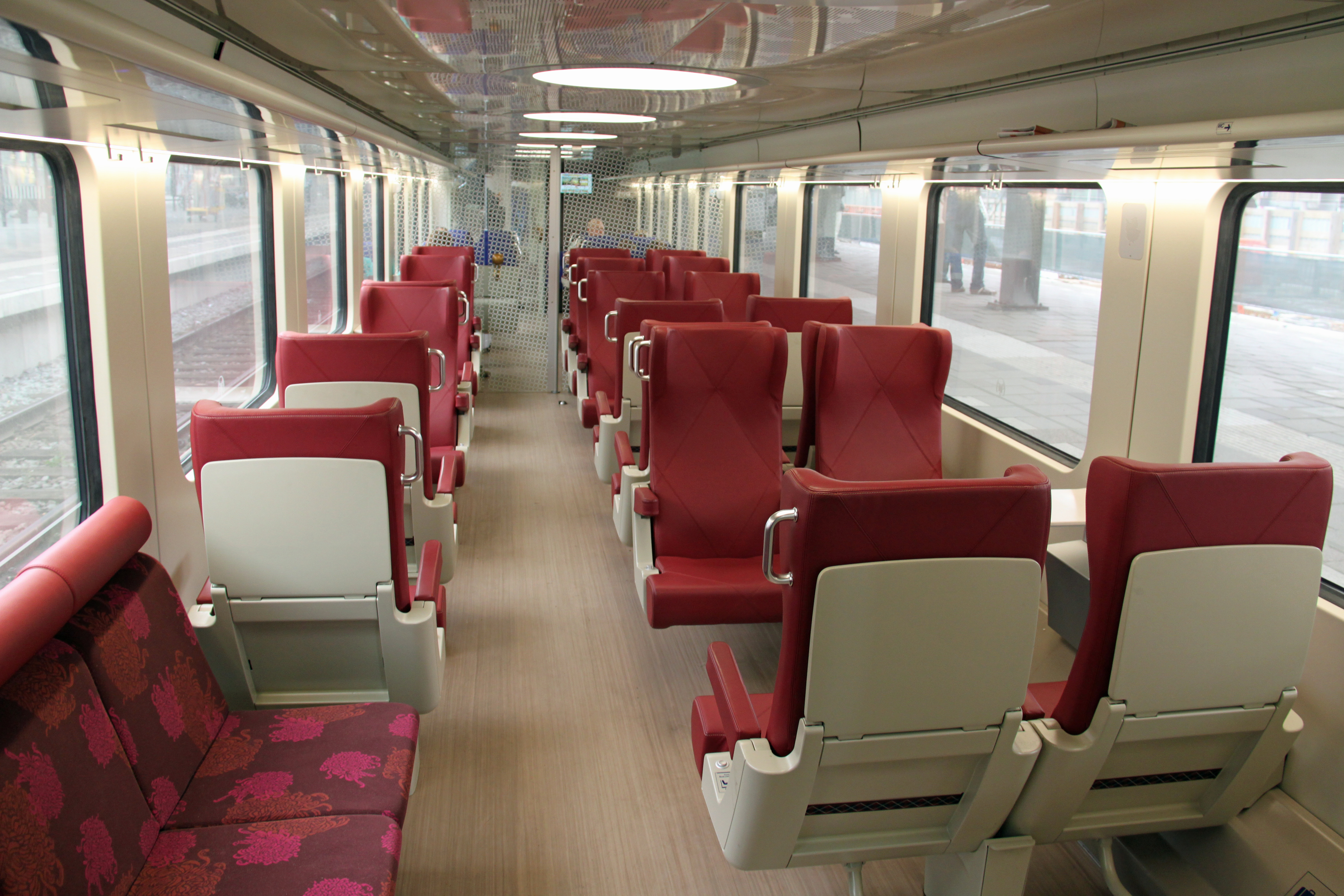
Refurbished first class interior

== Details ==
Series	Built	Quantity	First Class seating	Second Class seating	Total seating
Bvs – 270	1992–1994	79	0	120	120
Bv – 280	1992–1994	103	0	140	140
ABv – 280	1992–1994	76	64	60	124
mDDM – 390	1997–1998	50	16	48	64
