= Steenwijk railway station =

Railway station in the Netherlands

Steenwijk
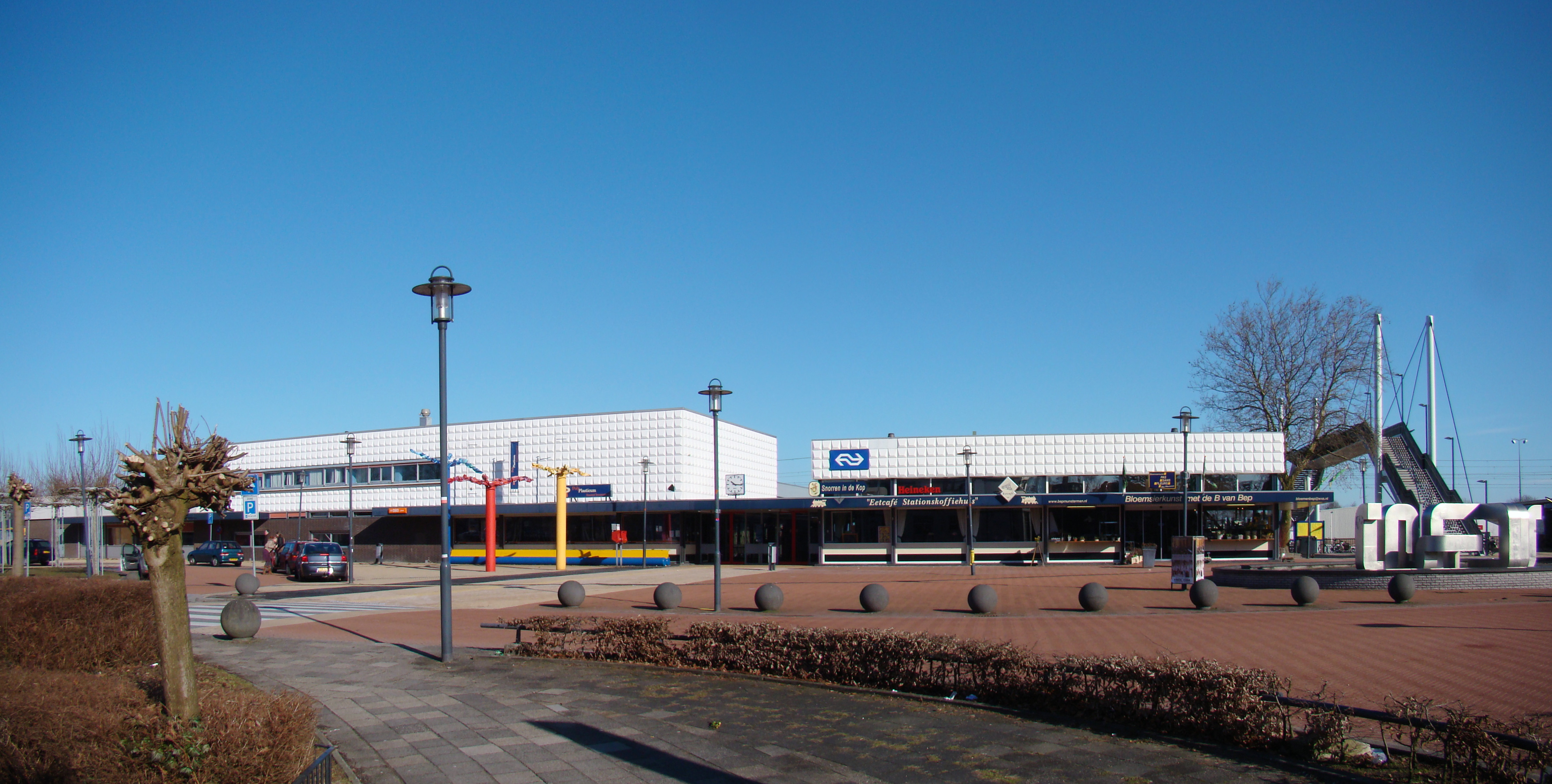

General information
- Location: Netherlands
- Coordinates: 52°47′27″N 6°06′58″E
- Line: Arnhem–Leeuwarden railway

History
- Opened: 15 January 1868

Services
Preceding station	Nederlandse Spoorwegen	Following station
Meppel towards Den Haag Centraal	NS Intercity 600	Heerenveen towards Leeuwarden
Meppel towards Schiphol Airport	NS Intercity 800	Heerenveen towards Leeuwarden
Meppel towards Lelystad Centrum	NS Sprinter 9000	Wolvega towards Leeuwarden
Location
- Location within Netherlands

Steenwijk is a railway station in Steenwijk, Netherlands. The station opened on 15 January 1868 and is on the Arnhem–Leeuwarden railway. Train services are operated by Nederlandse Spoorwegen.

== Train services ==
Route	Service type	Operator	Notes
Lelystad Centrum - Dronten - Kampen Zuid - Zwolle - Meppel - Steenwijk - Wolvega - Heerenveen - Akkrum - Grou-Jirnsum - Leeuwarden	Local ("Sprinter")	NS	Mon-Fri during daytime hours 2x per hour - On evenings and Sundays, this train operates 1x per hour
Den Haag Centraal - Gouda - Utrecht Centraal - Amersfoort Centraal - Zwolle - Meppel - Steenwijk - Heerenveen - Leeuwarden	Express ("Intercity")	NS	1x per hour
Schiphol Airport - Amsterdam Zuid - Almere Centrum - Lelystad Centrum - Zwolle - Meppel - Steenwijk - Heerenveen - Leeuwarden	Express ("Intercity")	NS	1x per hour

== Bus services ==
Line	Route	Operator	Notes
18	Steenwijk - Eesveen - Nijensleek - Frederiksoord - Noordwolde - Oosterstreek - Boyl - Elsloo - Makkinga - Oosterwolde	Qbuzz	No evening or weekend service.
20	Steenwijk - Eesveen - Frederiksoord - Vledder - Wapse - Diever - Dieverbrug - Smilde - Assen	Qbuzz	No evening or weekend service.
26	Steenwijk - Havelterberg - Veendijk - Nijeveen - Meppel	Qbuzz	No evening or weekend service.
70	Zwartsluis - Belt-Schutsloot - Blauwe Hand - Giethoorn - Steenwijk - (Tuk - Thij - Steenwijkerwold - Oldemarkt)	RRReis (EBS)	No evening service. The route between Steenwijk and Oldemarkt does not operate on weekends.
214	Steenwijk - Scheerwolde - Wetering - Blokzijl - Marknesse - Emmeloord - Nagele - Lelystad	RRReis (EBS)	No evening or weekend service.
217	Steenwijk - Eesveen - Nijensleek - Frederiksoord - Wilhelminaoord - Noordwolde - (Oldeberkoop - Vinkega - Steggerda - De Blesse - Oldeholtpade - Wolvega)	Qbuzz	This service only runs on weekday evenings and all day on Saturdays. Trips between Noordwolde and Wolvega operate only on request.
270	Steenwijk - Giethoorn - Blauwe Hand	RRReis (EBS)	Seasonal, March–October. No evening service.
687	Steenwijk - Eesveen	Qbuzz	Sundays only. This is an on-request service that requires a reservation a minimum of 1 hour before departure.
688	Steenwijk - Frederiksoord	Qbuzz	Sundays only. This is an on-request service that requires a reservation a minimum of 1 hour before departure.
691	Steenwijk - Noordwolde-Zuid	Qbuzz	Sundays only. This is an on-request service that requires a reservation a minimum of 1 hour before departure.
694	Steenwijk - Peperga	Qbuzz	Sundays only. This is an on-request service that requires a reservation a minimum of 1 hour before departure.
695	Steenwijk - Vinkega	Qbuzz	Sundays only. This is an on-request service that requires a reservation a minimum of 1 hour before departure.
697	Steenwijk - Wilhelminaoord	Qbuzz	Sundays only. This is an on-request service that requires a reservation a minimum of 1 hour before departure.
