= Wolvega railway station =

Railway station in the Netherlands

Wolvega
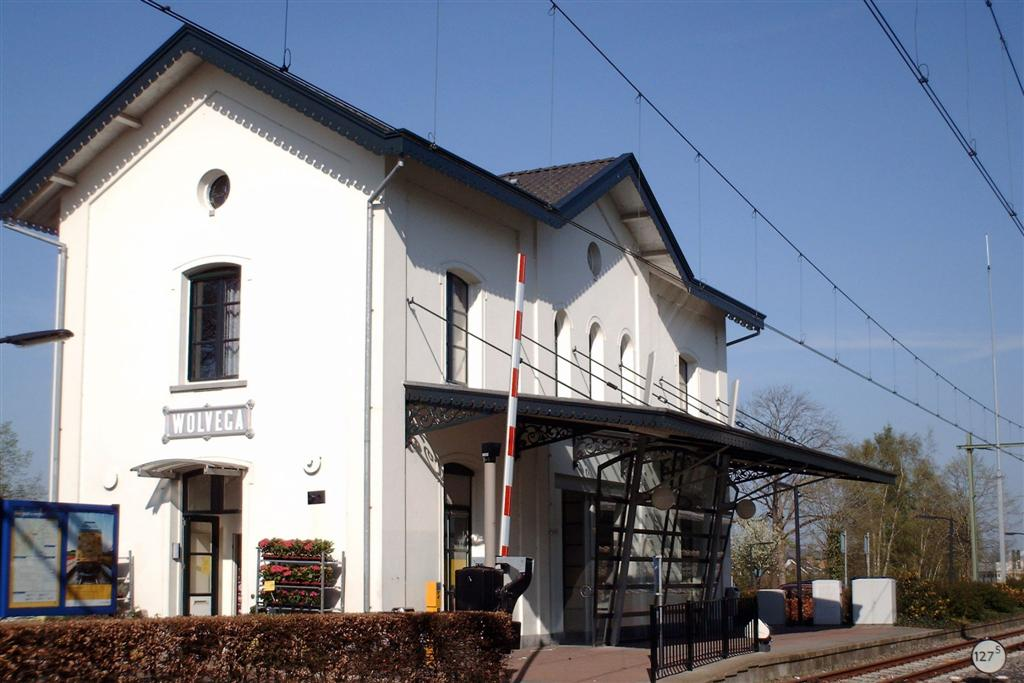

General information
- Location: Netherlands
- Coordinates: 52°52′47″N 6°00′17″E
- Line: Arnhem–Leeuwarden railway

History
- Opened: 15 January 1868

Services
Preceding station	Nederlandse Spoorwegen	Following station
Steenwijk towards Lelystad Centrum	NS Sprinter 9000	Heerenveen towards Leeuwarden
Location
- Location within Netherlands

Wolvega is a railway station in Wolvega, Netherlands. The station opened on 15 January 1868 and is on the Arnhem–Leeuwarden railway. The services are operated by Nederlandse Spoorwegen. It was designed by Karel Hendrik van Brederode and is of the SS 4th class type, the only remaining station building of this type in Friesland. After poor condition with a century of use, it avoided demolishing and the station was renovated in 1990-1992 by Peter Kilsdonk.

== Train services ==
Route	Service type	Operator	Notes
Lelystad - Zwolle - Wolvega - Heerenveen - Leeuwarden	Local ("Sprinter")	NS	Mon-Fri during daytime hours 2x per hour - On evenings and Sundays, this train operates 1x per hour

== Bus services ==
Bus services at this station are operated by Qbuzz.

Line	Route	Operator	Notes
16	Wolvega - Oldeholtpade - Oldeberkoop - Nijeberkoop - Makkinga - Oosterwolde	Qbuzz	No weekend service.
17	Heerenveen - Wolvega - De Blesse - Steggerda - Noordwolde	Qbuzz	No evening or weekend service.
108	Wolvega → Oldetrijne → Oldelamer → Munnekeburen → Scherpenzeel → Langelille → Oldelamer → Nijelamer → Sonnega → Wolvega	Qbuzz	No evening or weekend service.
217	Wolvega - Oldeholtpade - De Blesse - Steggerda - Vinkega - Oldeberkoop - Noordwolde - Wilhelminaoord - Frederiksoord - Nijensleek - Eesveen - Steenwijk	Qbuzz	Weekday evening and Saturday service only. Trips departing Wolvega station do not require a reservation, but pickups from all other stops require a reservation at least 1 hour before departure.
631	Wolvega - Langelille	Qbuzz	Weekday evening and weekend service only. This bus requires a reservation at least 1 hour before departure.
633	Wolvega - De Hoeve	Qbuzz	This bus requires a reservation at least 1 hour before departure.
634	Wolvega - Munnekeburen	Qbuzz	Weekday evening and weekend service only. This bus requires a reservation at least 1 hour before departure.
635	Wolvega - Nijeholtpade	Qbuzz	Sunday service only. This bus requires a reservation at least 1 hour before departure.
636	Wolvega - Nijeholtwolde	Qbuzz	This bus requires a reservation at least 1 hour before departure
637	Wolvega - Nijelamer	Qbuzz	This bus requires a reservation at least 1 hour before departure.
638	Wolvega - Nijetrijne	Qbuzz	This bus requires a reservation at least 1 hour before departure.
639	Wolvega - Oldeholtwolde	Qbuzz	Weekday evening and weekend service only. This bus requires a reservation at least 1 hour before departure.
640	Wolvega - Oldelamer	Qbuzz	Weekday evening and weekend service only. This bus requires a reservation at least 1 hour before departure.
641	Wolvega - Oldetrijne	Qbuzz	Weekday evening and weekend service only. This bus requires a reservation at least 1 hour before departure.
642	Wolvega - Scherpenzeel	Qbuzz	Weekday evening and weekend service only. This bus requires a reservation at least 1 hour before departure.
643	Wolvega - Slijkenburg	Qbuzz	Weekday evening and weekend service only. This bus requires a reservation at least 1 hour before departure.
644	Wolvega - Sonnega	Qbuzz	Weekday evening and weekend service only. This bus requires a reservation at least 1 hour before departure.
645	Wolvega - Spanga	Qbuzz	Weekday evening and weekend service only. This bus requires a reservation at least 1 hour before departure.
646	Wolvega - Ter Idzard	Qbuzz	This bus requires a reservation at least 1 hour before departure.
648	Wolvega - Zandhuizen	Qbuzz	This bus only operates midday on weekdays and all day on Sundays. This bus requires a reservation at least 1 hour before departure.
675	Wolvega - Noordwolde	Qbuzz	Sunday service only. This bus requires a reservation at least 1 hour before departure.
685	Wolvega - De Blesse	Qbuzz	Sunday service only. This bus requires a reservation at least 1 hour before departure.
690	Wolvega - Blesdijke	Qbuzz	Weekday evening and weekend service only. This bus requires a reservation at least 1 hour before departure.
692	Wolvega - Oldeberkoop	Qbuzz	No service during peak hours. This bus requires a reservation at least 1 hour before departure.
693	Wolvega - Oldeholtpade	Qbuzz	Sunday service only. This bus requires a reservation at least 1 hour before departure.
694	Wolvega - Peperga	Qbuzz	Sunday service only. This bus requires a reservation at least 1 hour before departure.
695	Wolvega - Steggerda	Qbuzz	Sunday service only. This bus requires a reservation at least 1 hour before departure.
696	Wolvega - Vinkega	Qbuzz	Sunday service only. This bus requires a reservation at least 1 hour before departure.

== See also ==
- List of railway stations in Friesland
