= Meppel railway station =

Railway station in Meppel, Netherlands

Meppel
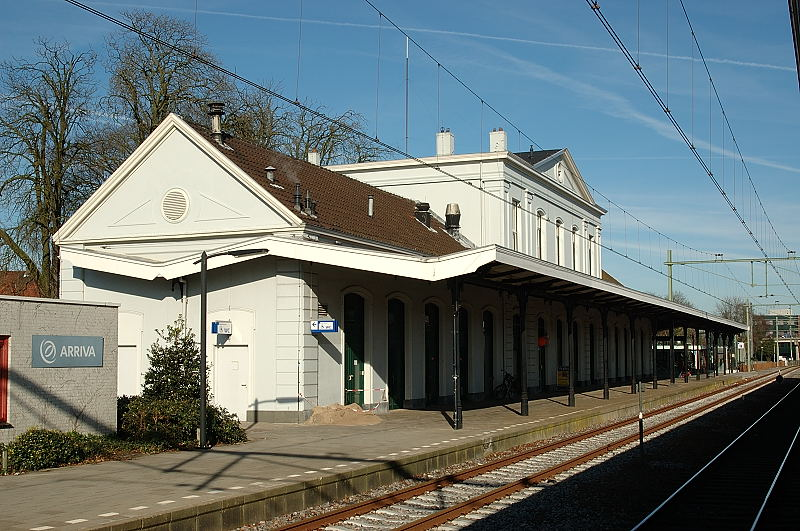

General information
- Location: Netherlands
- Coordinates: 52°41′29″N 6°11′51″E
- Lines: Arnhem–Leeuwarden railway Meppel–Groningen railway
- Platforms: 3

Other information
- Station code: Mp

History
- Opened: 1 October 1867; 158 years ago

Services
Preceding station	Nederlandse Spoorwegen	Following station
Zwolle towards Den Haag Centraal	NS Intercity 600	Steenwijk towards Leeuwarden
Zwolle towards Schiphol Airport	NS Intercity 800	Steenwijk towards Leeuwarden
Zwolle Terminus	NS Sprinter 6100	Hoogeveen towards Groningen
Zwolle towards Lelystad Centrum	NS Sprinter 9000	Steenwijk towards Leeuwarden
Location
- Location within Netherlands

Meppel is a railway station in Meppel, Netherlands. The station opened on 1 October 1867 and is on the Arnhem–Leeuwarden railway and Meppel–Groningen railway. Train services are operated by Nederlandse Spoorwegen.

== History ==
The building was constructed in 1867 according to a standardised layout by the State Railways, namely the revised "third class". The classical design probably comes from Karel Hendrik van Brederode, who also designed several other models for the State Railways.

Meppel station was renovated in 1982, which mainly involved the station's interior. It became a national heritage site on 28 January 1998.

== Train services ==
Route	Service type	Operator	Notes
Zwolle – Meppel – Groningen	Local ("Sprinters")	NS	2x per hour – On Sundays, this train operates 1x per hour until 15:00, then 2x per hour after
Leeuwarden – Heerenveen – Meppel – Zwolle – Amersfoort – Utrecht – Gouda – Den Haag	Express ("Intercity")	NS	1x per hour
Leeuwarden – Heerenveen – Meppel – Zwolle – Lelystad – Almere – Amsterdam – Schiphol	Express ("Intercity")	NS	1x per hour
Leeuwarden – Heerenveen – Meppel – Zwolle – Lelystad	Local ("Sprinter")	NS	2x per hour – 1x per hour after 20:00 and on weekends

== Bus services ==
Line	Route	Operator	Notes
Blauw ("Blue")	Meppel Station - Meppel Haveltermade	TCZ	No evening or Sunday service.
Paars ("Purple")	Meppel Station - Meppel Oosterboer	TCZ	No evening or Sunday service.
26	Meppel - Nijeveen - Veendijk - Havelterberg - Steenwijk	Qbuzz	No evening or weekend service.
28	Meppel – Havelte - Uffelte - Dieverbrug - Dwingeloo - (Lhee - Spier - Wijster - Holthe - Beilen)	Qbuzz	Trips only extend to Beilen during peak hours. All other trips terminate in Dwingeloo.
32	Meppel – Ruinerwold - Oosteinde - Ruinen - Pesse - Hoogeveen	Qbuzz	
34	Meppel – De Wijk - Koekange - Veeningen - Zuidwolde - Ten Arlo - Hoogeveen	Qbuzz	
40	Meppel - Staphorst - Rouveen - Lichtmis - Zwolle	RRReis (EBS)	
134	Meppel - De Wijk - Haalweide - Eemten - Veeningen - Zuidwolde	Qbuzz	Peak hours only.
428	Meppel → Havelte → Uffelte → Dieverbrug → Dwingeloo	Qbuzz	Saturday nights only. Only operates in one direction.
432	Meppel → Ruinerwold → Oosteinde → Ruinen → Meppel	Qbuzz	Saturday nights only. Only operates in one direction.
592	Meppel - De Wijk - IJhorst	RRReis (EBS)	No evening or Sunday service.
679	Meppel - Dinxterveen - Wanneperveen - Westeinde - Blauwe Hand - Sint Jansklooster - Vollenhove	RRReis (EBS)	Peak hours only. Does not operate during school holidays.

== Gallery ==
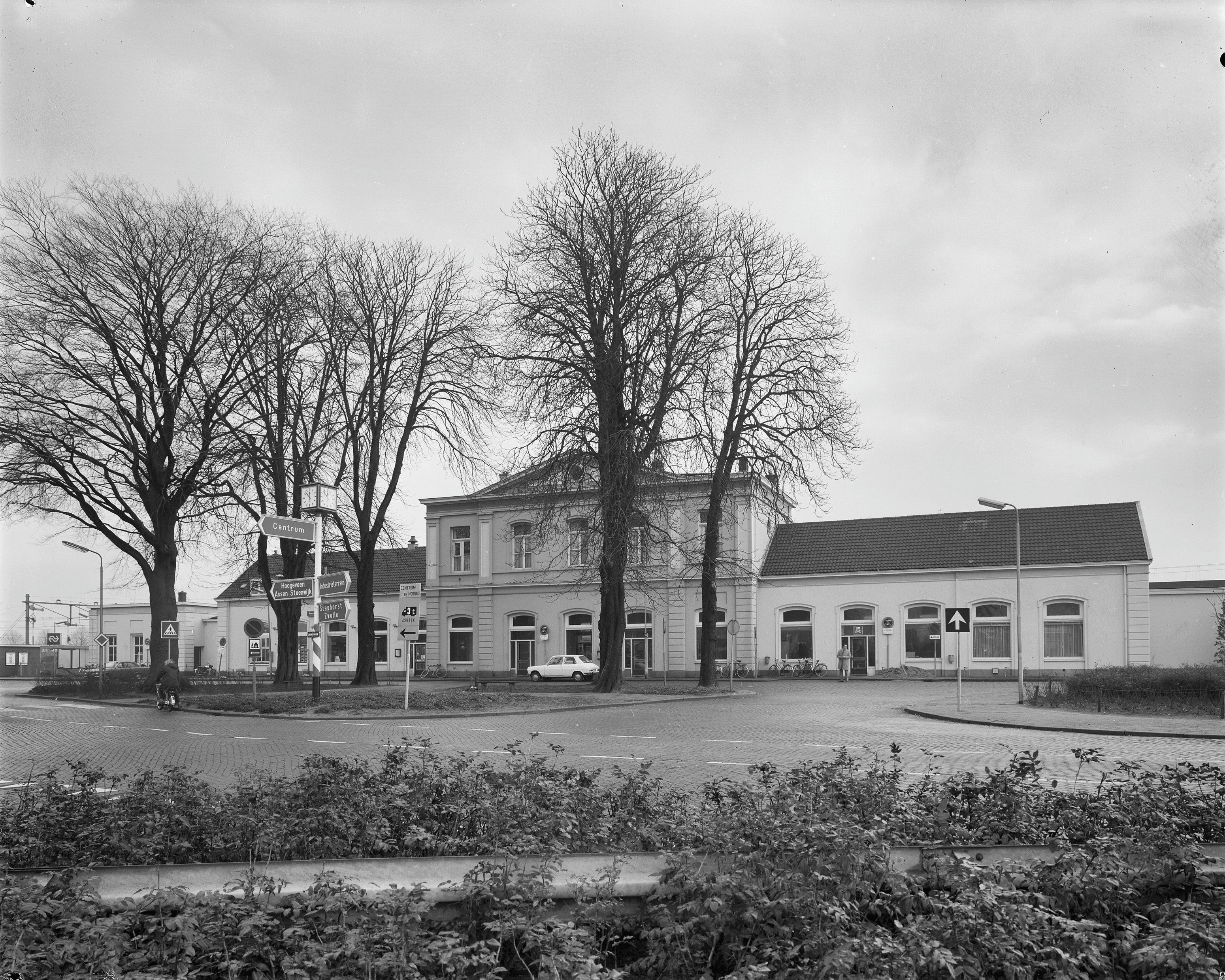
Meppel railway station; January 1974.

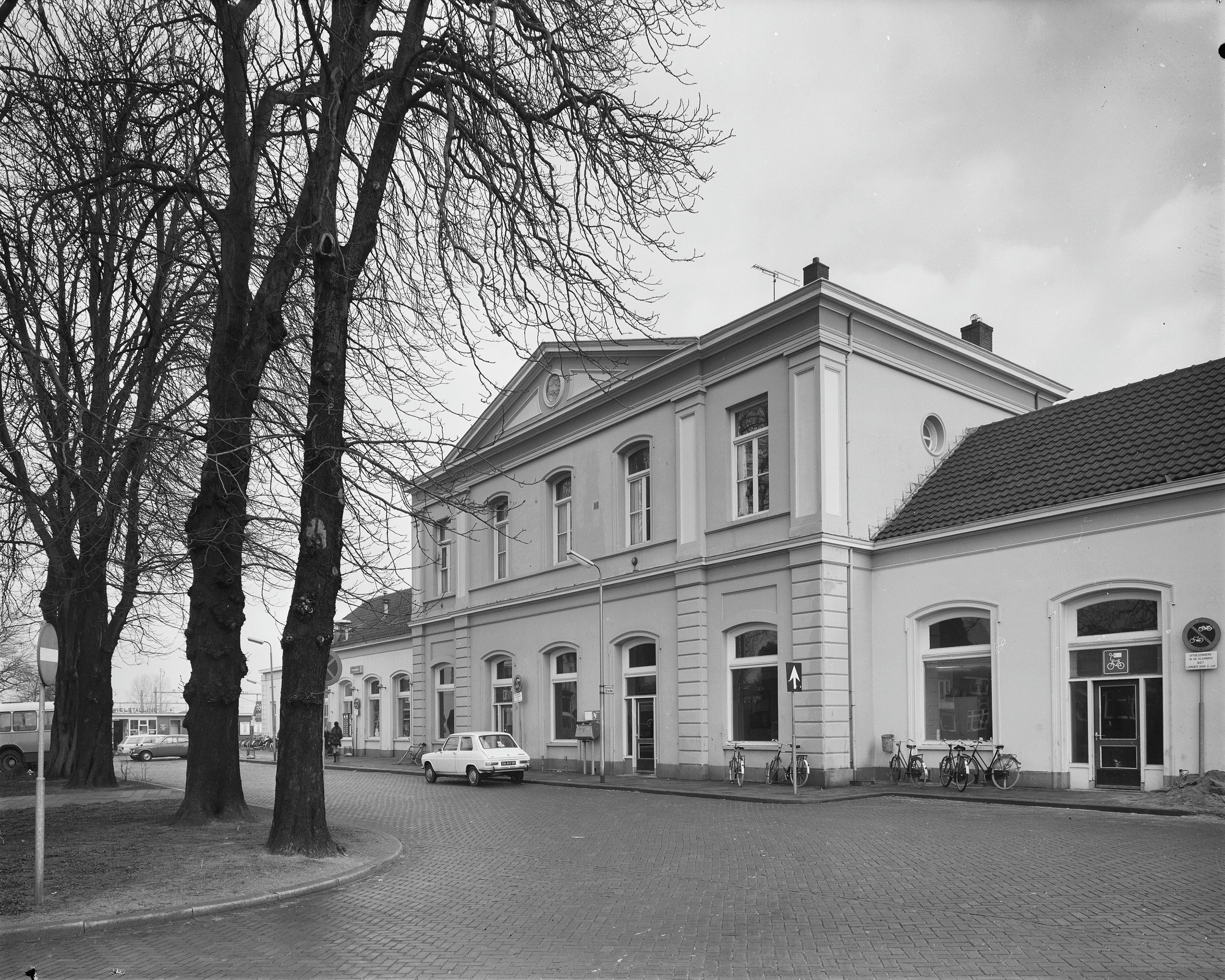
Meppel railway station; January 1974.

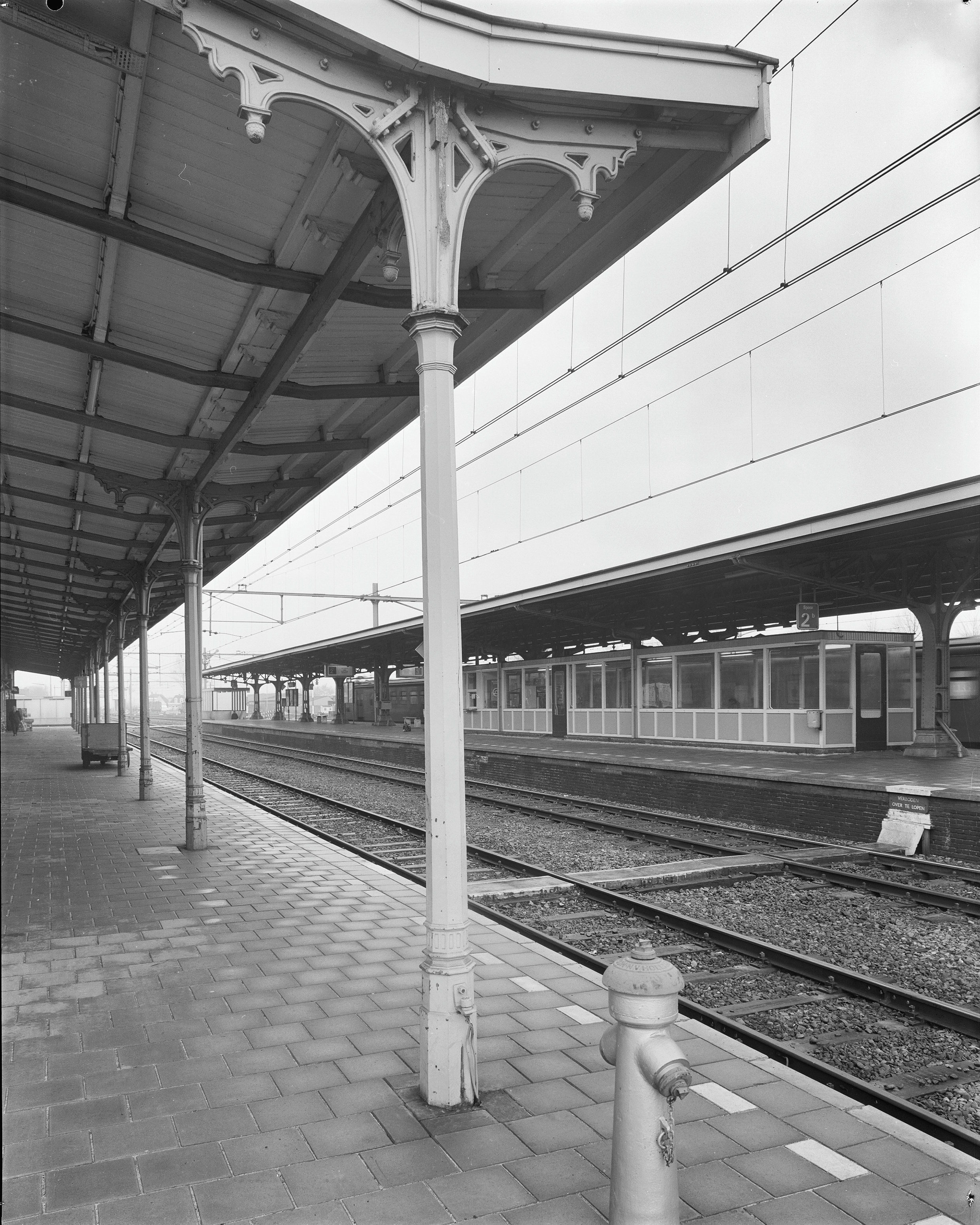
Meppel railway station; January 1974.

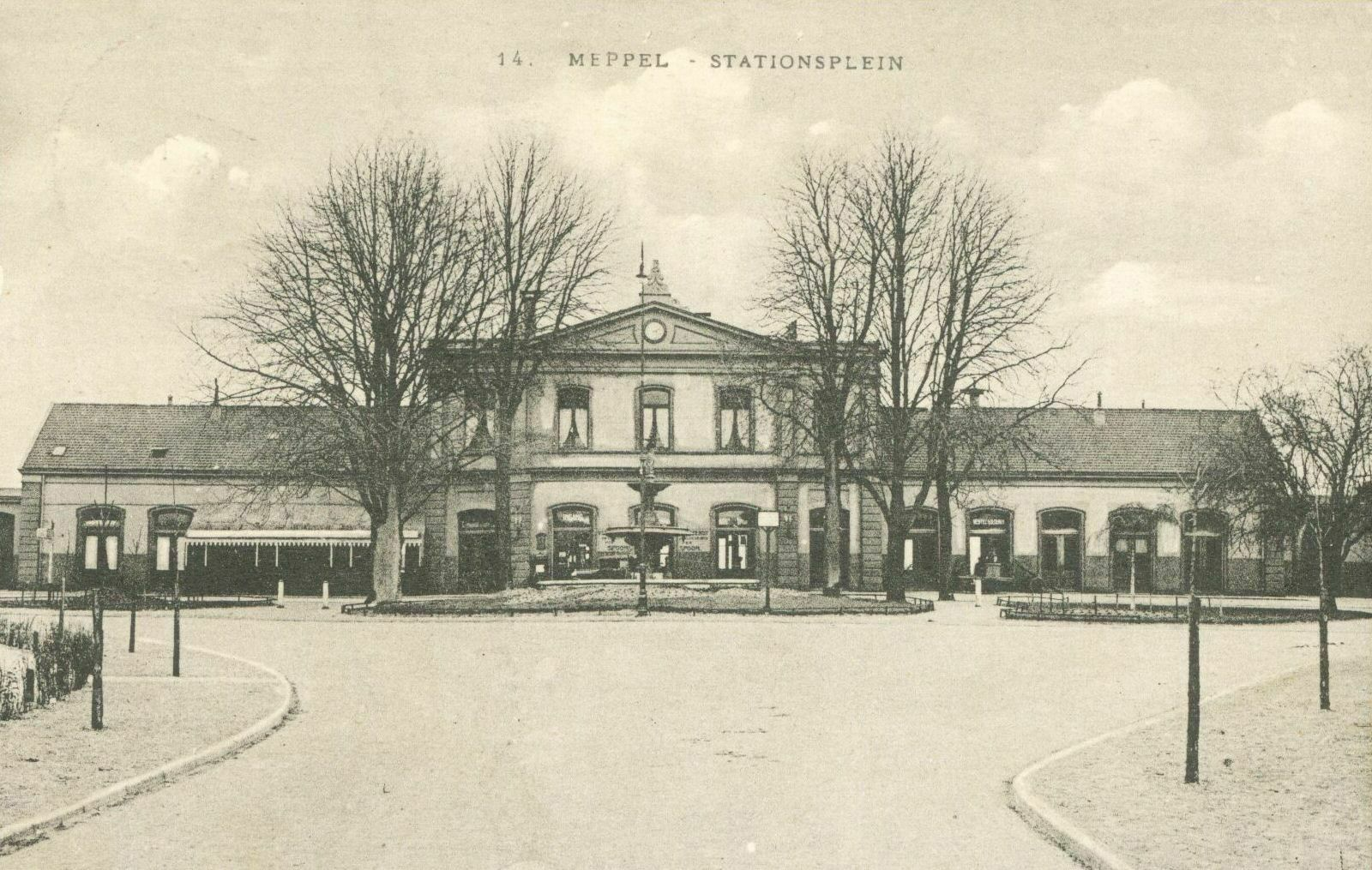
Gezicht op het station Meppel; circa 1930.

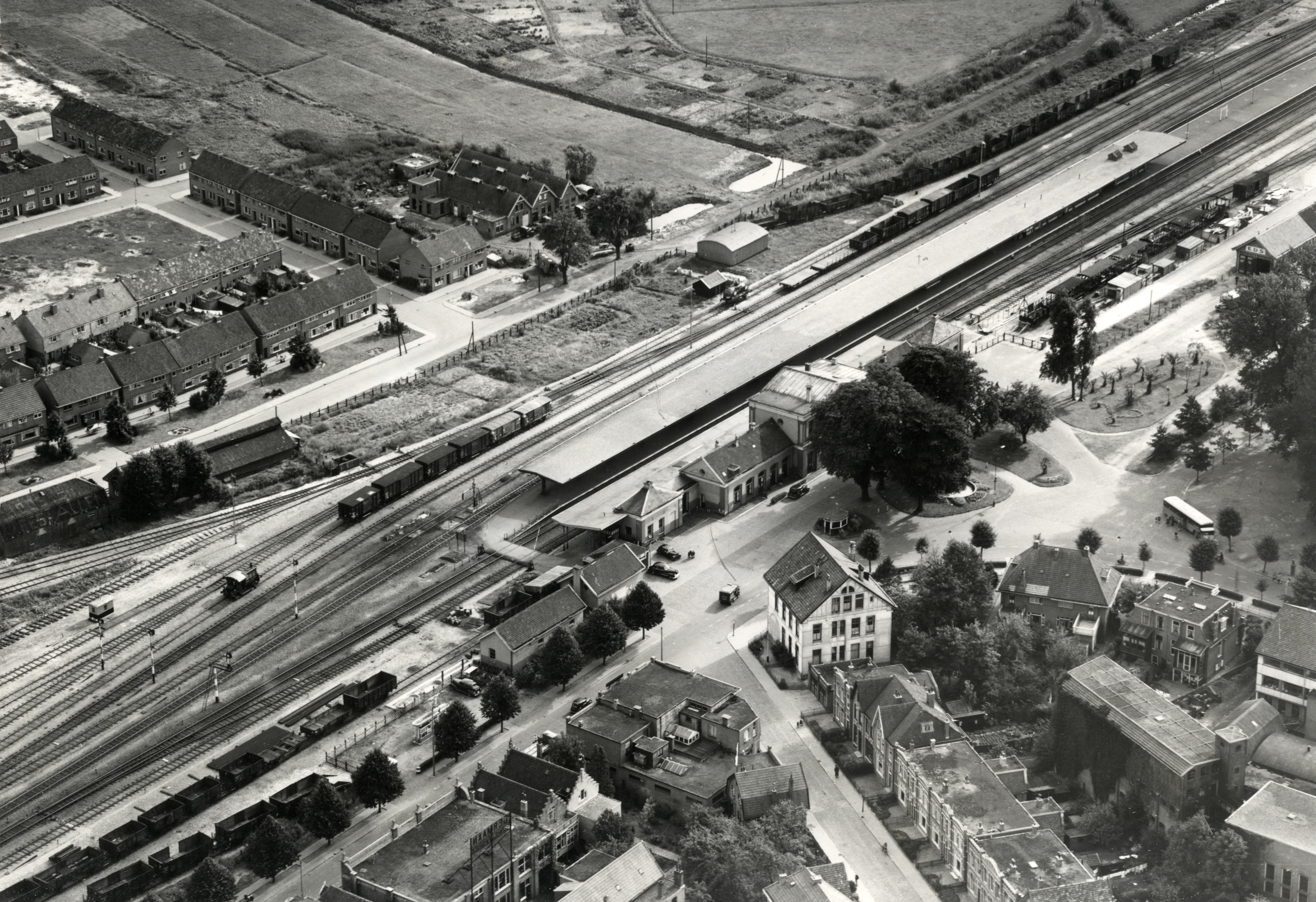
Aerial photo of Meppel station; October 1, 1947

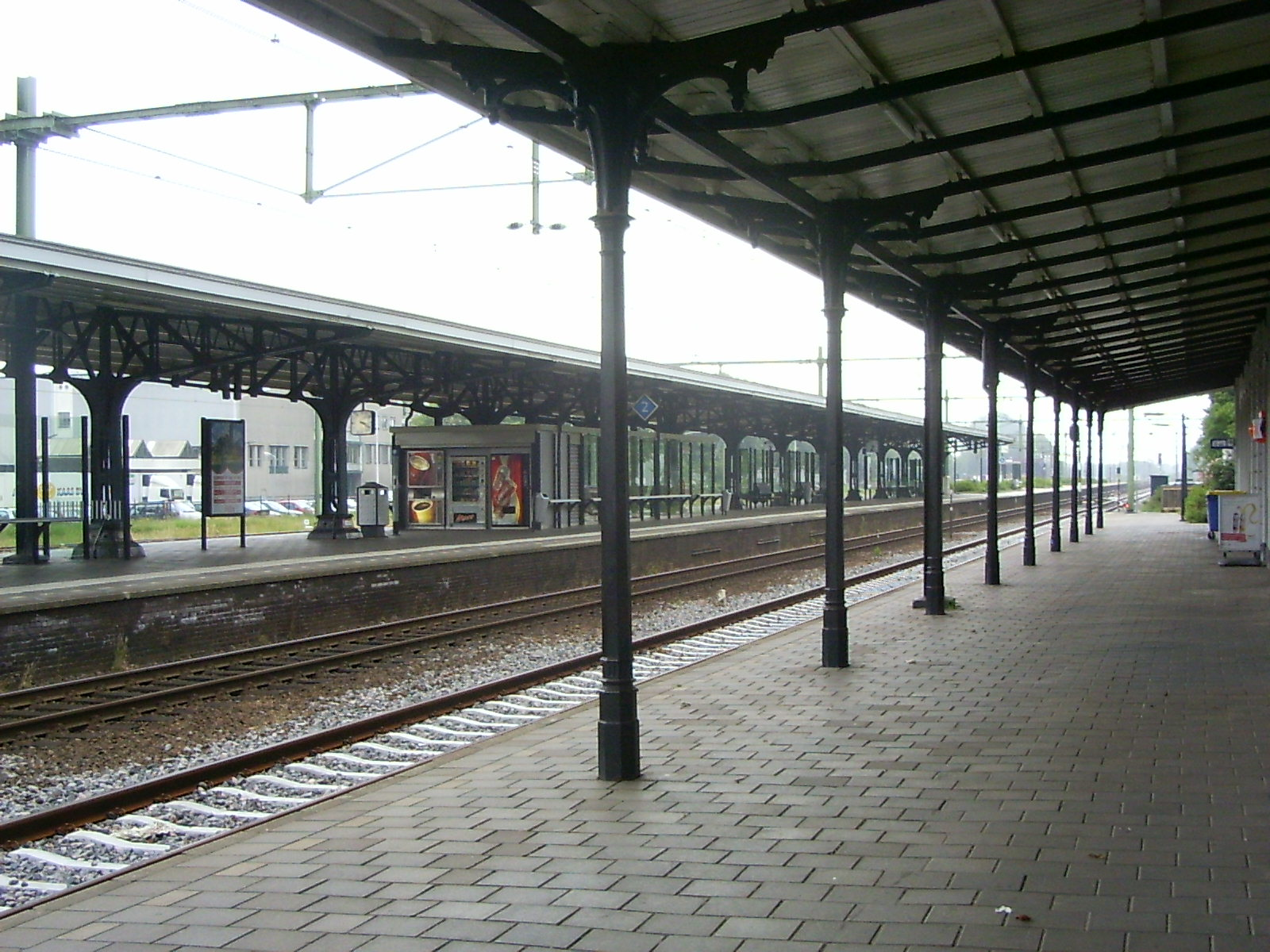
The two platforms in Meppel.

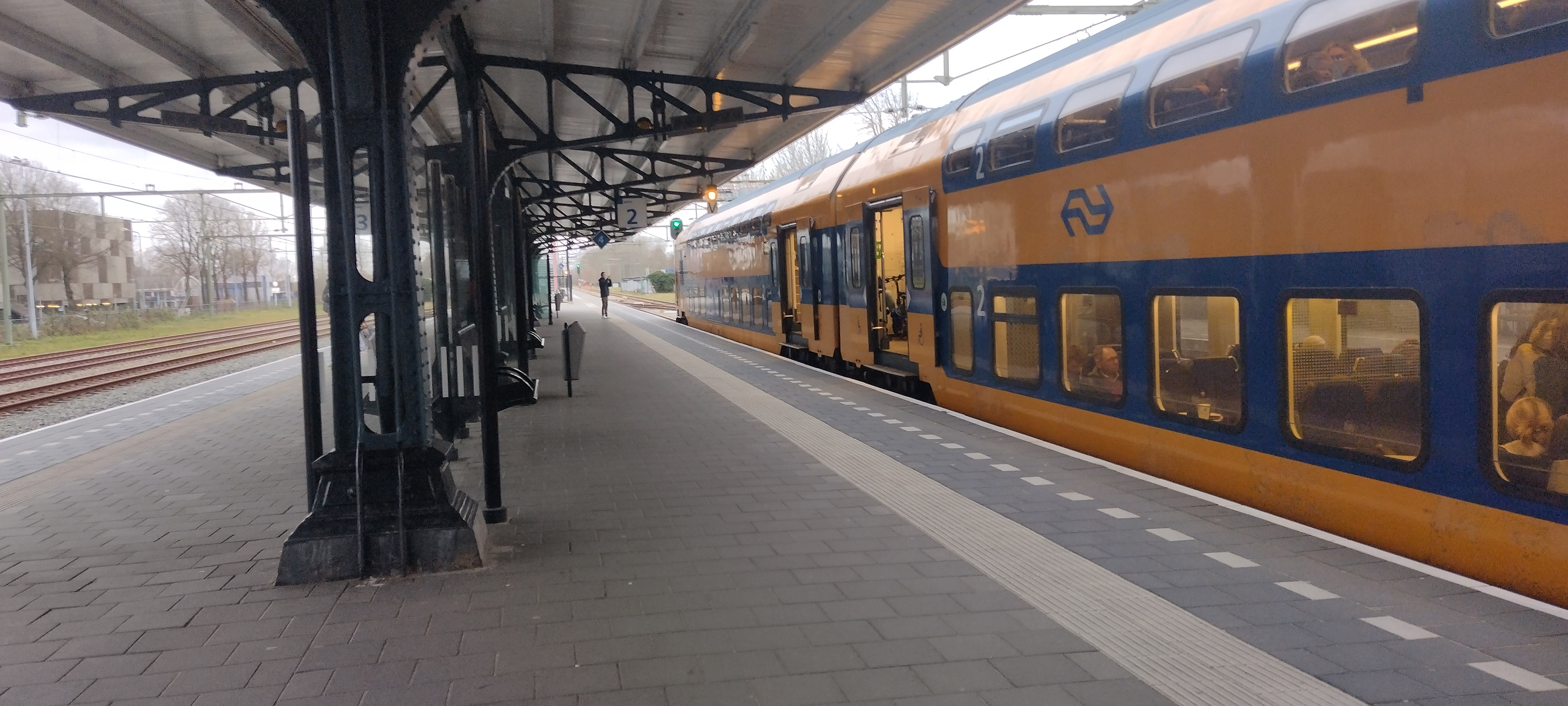
DDZ at Meppel railway station.

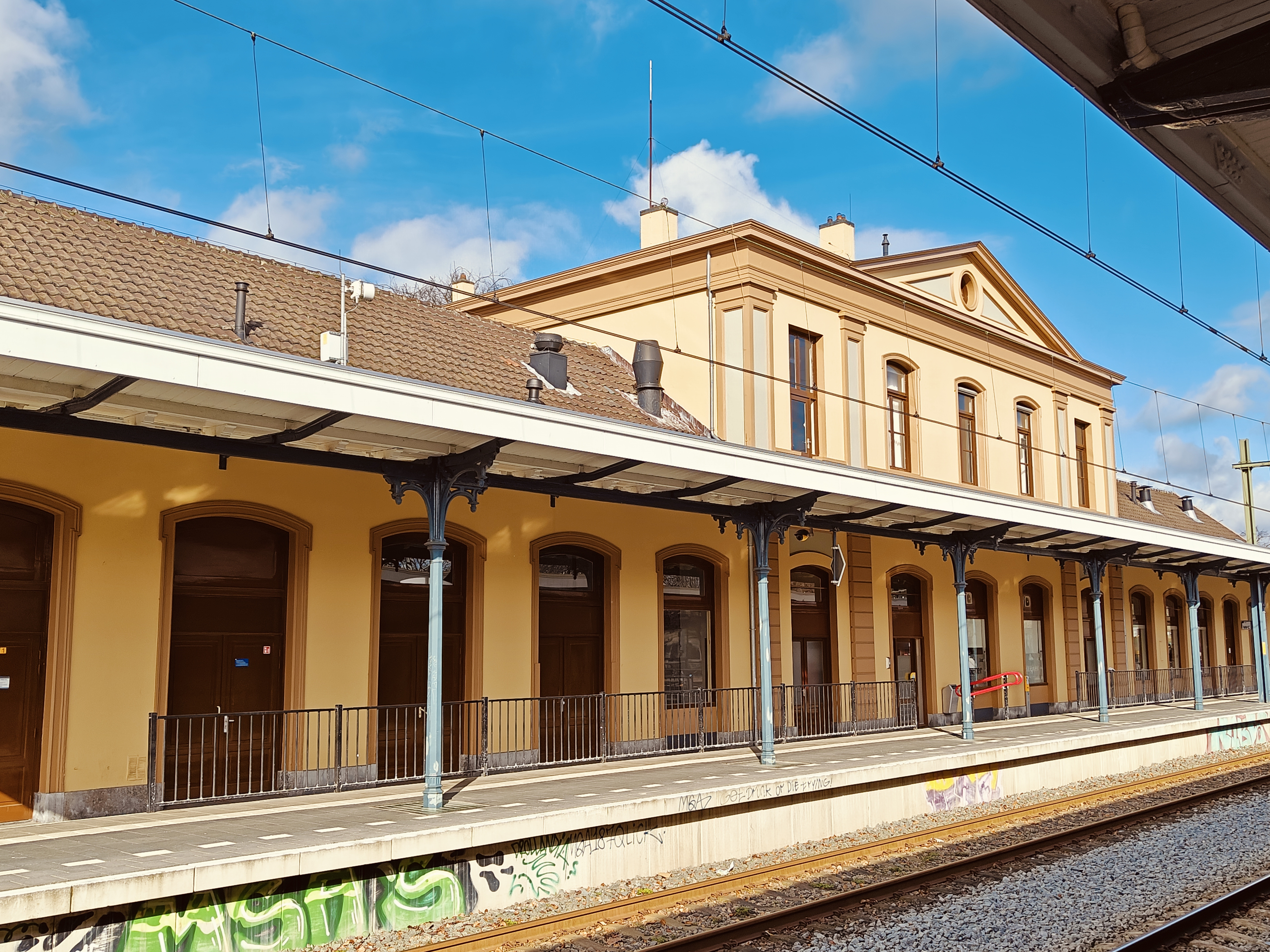
Meppel railway station; March 2024.

== See also ==
- List of railway stations in Drenthe
