= Arnhem–Leeuwarden railway =

Railway line in eastern Netherlands

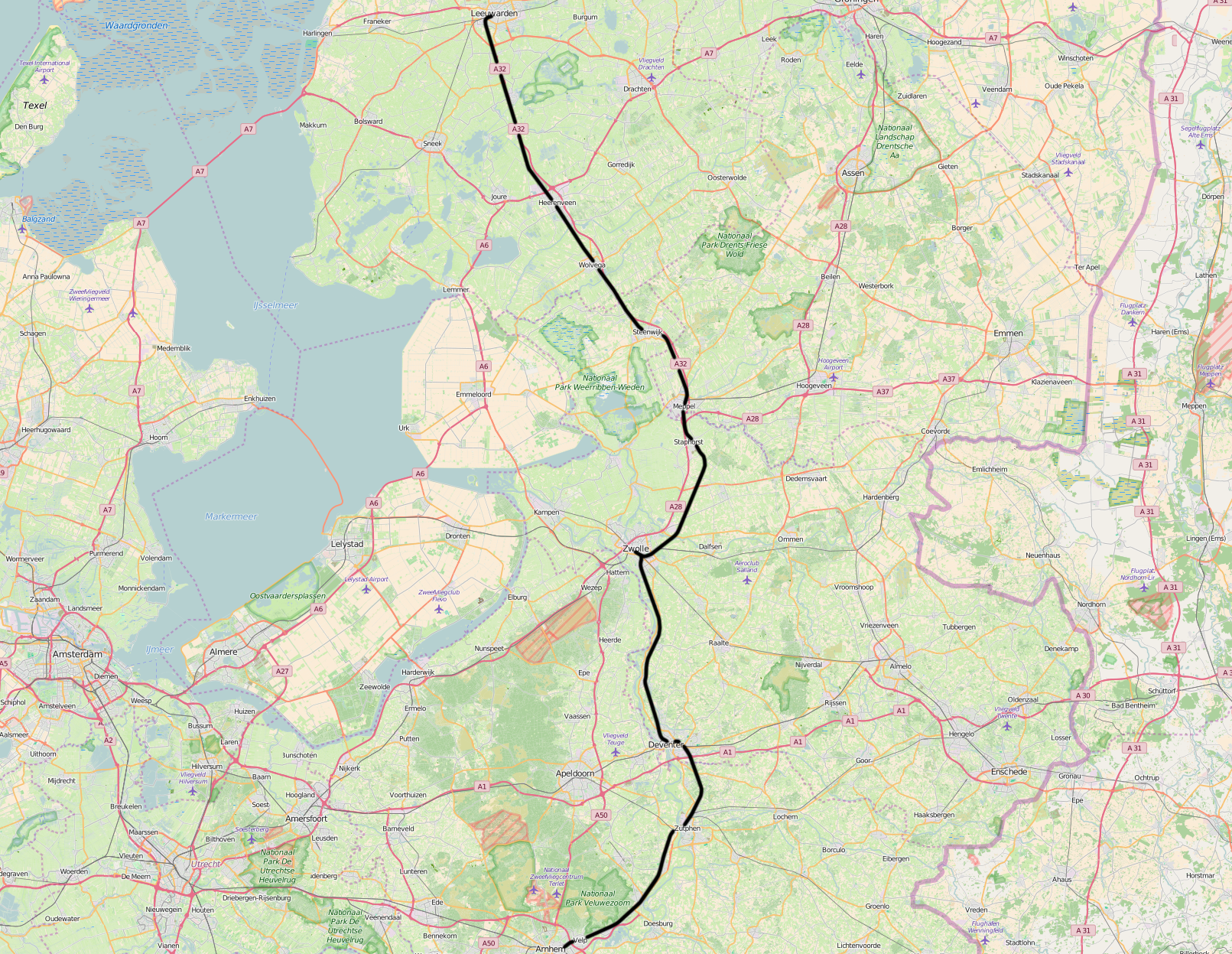

Overview
- Status: Operational
- Owner: Prorail
- Locale: Netherlands
- Termini: Arnhem railway station; Leeuwarden railway station

Service
- Operator(s): Nederlandse Spoorwegen

History
- Opened: 1868

Technical
- Line length: 166 km (103 mi)
- Number of tracks: Arnhem–Deventer double-track, Deventer–Olst single-track, Olst-Leeuwarden double-track
- Track gauge: 1,435 mm (4 ft 8 1/2 in) standard gauge
- Electrification: 1.5 kV DC

The Arnhem–Leeuwarden railway is a railway line in the Netherlands running from Arnhem to Leeuwarden, passing through Deventer, Zwolle and Heerenveen. It is also called the Staatslijn A ("state line A") in Dutch. The part between Arnhem and Zwolle is sometimes called the IJssellijn ("IJssel line").

== History ==
The line opened between 1865 and 1868. During the Second World War, the tracks between Deventer and Olst were removed by the German occupiers following the national railway strike from 1944 onwards. It had been a double-track section like the rest of the line, but was replaced post-war by a single track due to costs.

== Stations ==
The main interchange stations on the Arnhem–Leeuwarden railway are:

- Arnhem: to Cologne, Utrecht, Tiel, Nijmegen and 's-Hertogenbosch
- Zutphen: to Apeldoorn, Winterswijk and Hengelo
- Deventer: to Apeldoorn, Utrecht, Almelo and Berlin
- Zwolle: to Groningen, Kampen, Amersfoort, Almelo and Emmen
- Steenwijk:
- Meppel: to Groningen
- Leeuwarden: to Groningen, Harlingen and Stavoren

== Closed stations ==
Ittersum, Herculo, Windesheim, Herxen, Wijnvoorden, Bovendorp, De Boerhaar, Diepenveen West, Rande, De Platvoet, Boksbergerweg, Snippeling, Colmschate, Epse, Gorssel, Eefde, Hungerink-Mettray, Nieuwstad, Hoven, Voorstonden, Het Vosje, Weg naar Voorst, Leuvenheim, Spankeren, Villa Hofstetten, Ellecom, Klein Avegoor, Diepesteeg, Holleweg, Hotel Den Engel, De Steeg, Worth-Rheden, Hotel Naeff, Cafe Unie and Plattenburg.

== Train services ==
The following train services use part of the Arnhem–Leeuwarden railway:

- intercity service The Hague/Rotterdam - Utrecht - Amersfoort - Zwolle - Steenwijk - Leeuwarden
- intercity service Schiphol - Hilversum - Amersfoort - Zwolle - Steenwijk - Leeuwarden
- intercity service Zwolle - Deventer - Arnhem - Nijmegen - 's-Hertogenbosch - Roosendaal
- local service (sprinter) Nijmegen - Arnhem - Zutphen
- local service (stoptrein) Zwolle - Assen - Groningen
