= Kampen Zuid railway station =

Railway station in the Netherlands

Kampen Zuid
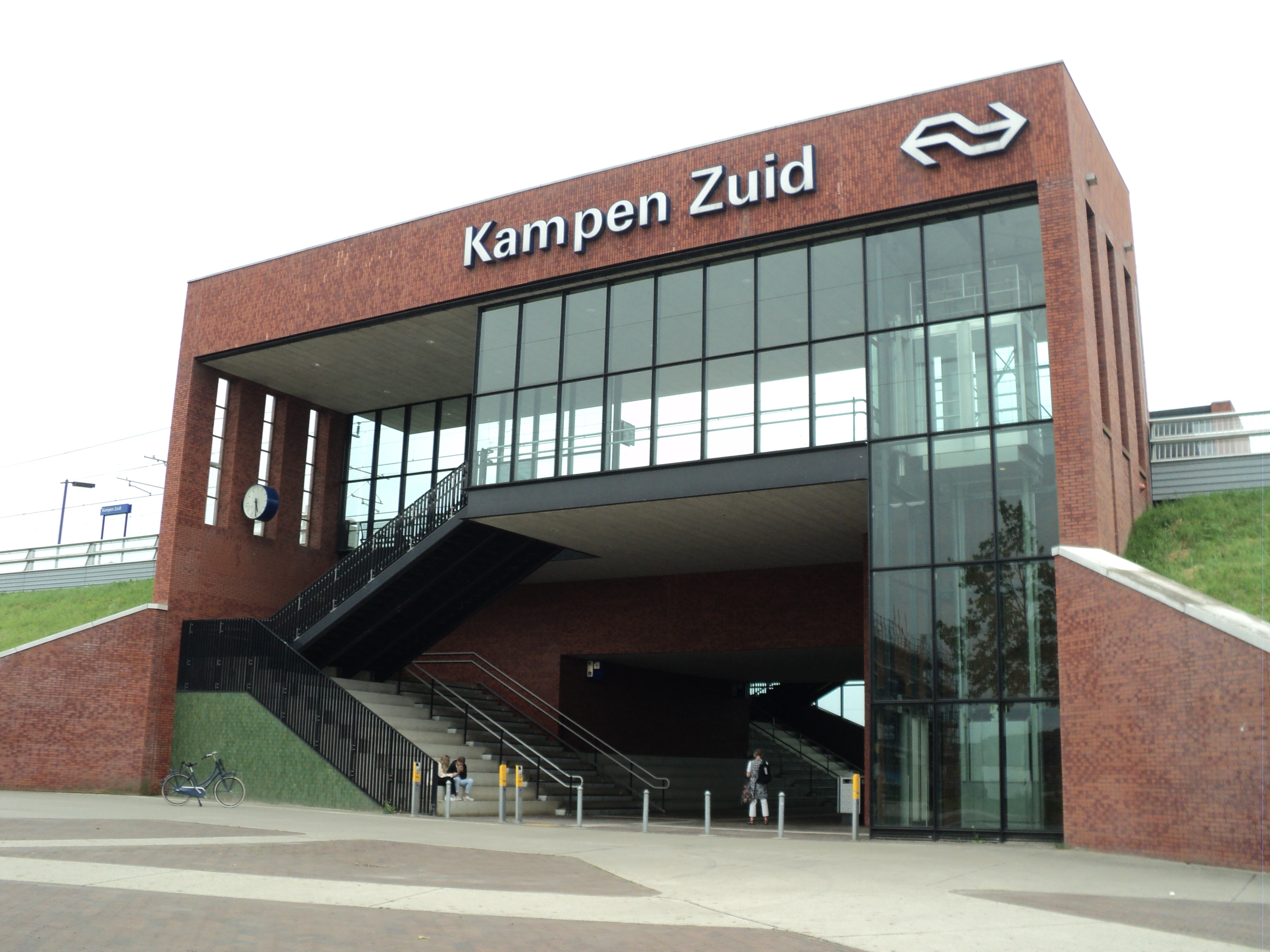

General information
- Location: Burgemeester van Tuinenplein 1; 8265TJ Kampen
- Coordinates: 52°32′03″N 5°54′57″E
- Line: Lelystad–Zwolle railway

History
- Opened: 9 December 2012; 13 years ago

Services
Preceding station	Nederlandse Spoorwegen	Following station
Dronten towards Lelystad Centrum	NS Sprinter 9000	Zwolle towards Leeuwarden
Location
- Location within Netherlands

Kampen Zuid is a railway station in the Netherlands, located on the Lelystad–Zwolle railway, also known as the Hanzelijn. The station is located in the south of Kampen, Overijssel.

The station opened on 9 December 2012, with there being 2 platforms and 2 tracks. InterCity trains from The Hague and Schiphol to Groningen and Leeuwarden pass through the station on the middle tracks.

== Earlier station ==
Between 1 October 1913 and 15 May 1934 there also was a station called Kampen Zuid. This was the terminus of the Kampen–Hattem railway line, which connected with the Zwolle–Apeldoorn railway line in Hattem.

== Train services ==
As of 15 December 2024, the following train services call at this station:

- 2× per hour local Sprinter service from Lelystad Centrum to Zwolle, Meppel, Heerenveen and Leeuwarden

== Bus services ==
- 510 (local service). To Stadsbuurtbus (Kampen)
- 74. To Hasselt

All bus services are operated by RRReis as of 10 December 2023.

== See also ==
- Kampen railway station
