= Zwolle railway station =

Railway station in Zwolle, Netherlands

Zwolle
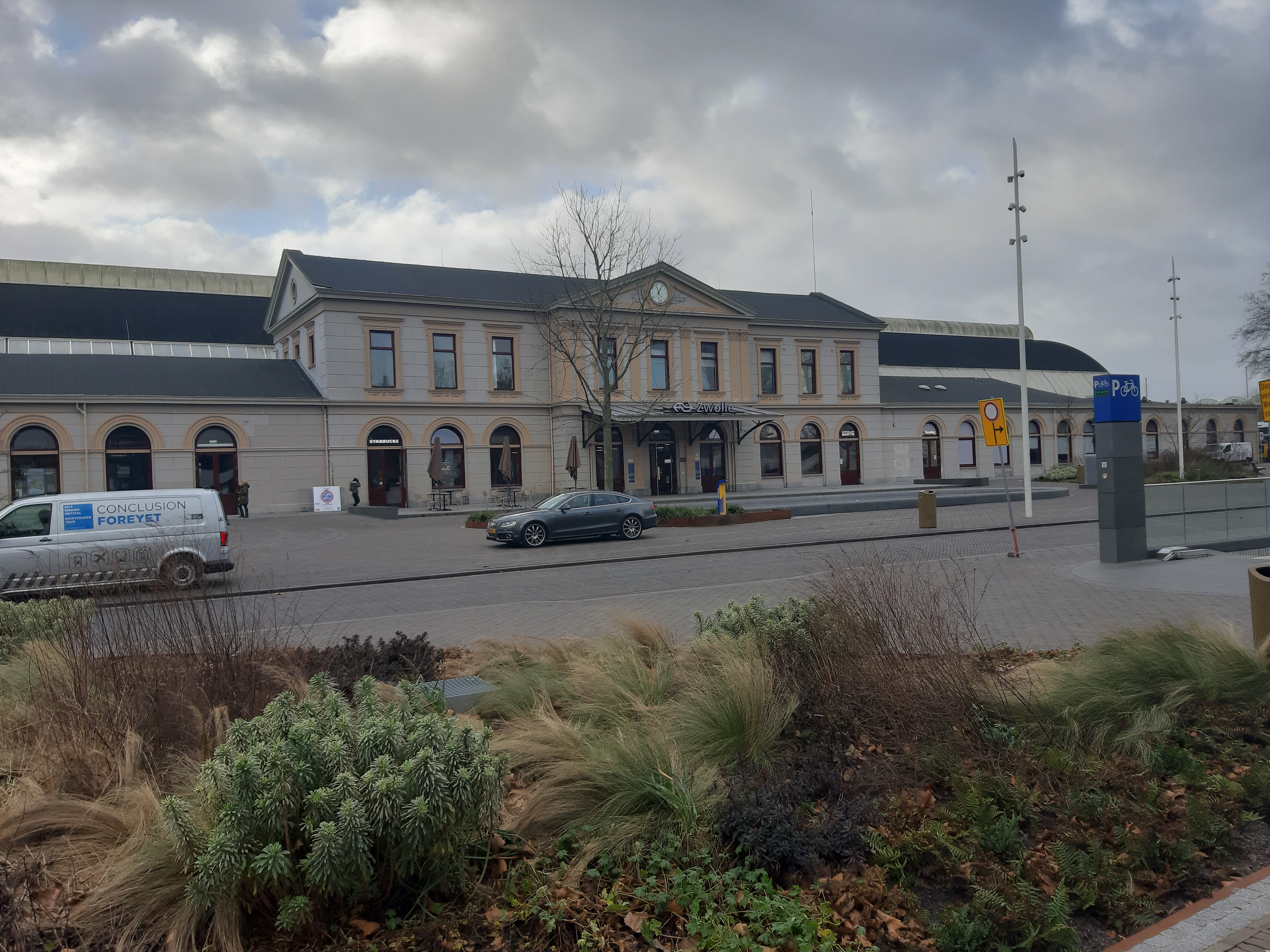
- Zwolle railway station

General information
- Location: Zwolle, Overijssel, Netherlands
- Coordinates: 52°30′19″N 6°5′26″E
- Owner: Nederlandse Spoorwegen
- Lines: Utrecht–Kampen railway Arnhem–Leeuwarden railway Zwolle–Almelo railway Zwolle–Stadskanaal railway Lelystad–Zwolle railway
- Platforms: 9
- Tracks: 13
- Connections: OV Regio IJsselmond: 70, 71, 74, 171, 641; Syntus: 1, 2, 3, 4, 5, 6, 7, 8, 9, 10, 12, 29, 40, 83, 100, 161, 166, 167, 200, 201, 202, 203, 609, 667, 668

Other information
- Station code: Zl

History
- Opened: 6 June 1864; 162 years ago
Services
Preceding station	Nederlandse Spoorwegen	Following station
Amersfoort Centraal towards Den Haag Centraal	NS Intercity 500	Assen towards Groningen
Amersfoort Centraal towards Den Haag Centraal	NS Intercity 600	Meppel towards Leeuwarden
Lelystad Centrum towards Schiphol Airport	NS Intercity 700	Assen towards Groningen
Lelystad Centrum towards Schiphol Airport	NS Intercity 800	Meppel towards Leeuwarden
Terminus	NS Intercity 3600	Wijhe towards Roosendaal
Wezep towards Utrecht Centraal	NS Sprinter 5600	Terminus
Terminus	NS Sprinter 6100	Meppel towards Groningen
Kampen Zuid towards Lelystad Centrum	NS Sprinter 9000	Meppel towards Leeuwarden
Preceding station	Keolis Nederland	Following station
Terminus	Sprinter 7900	Heino towards Enschede
Zwolle Stadshagen towards Kampen	Sprinter 8500	Terminus
Terminus	Intercity 17900 Not in evenings or weekend	Raalte towards Enschede
Preceding station	Arriva Netherlands	Following station
Terminus	Sneltrein 3800	Dalfsen towards Emmen
Terminus	Sneltrein 13800 Peak hours only	Dalfsen towards Emmen
Terminus	Stoptrein 8000	Dalfsen towards Emmen
Lelystad Centrum towards Schiphol Airport	Nachttrein 32780 Friday night only	Assen towards Groningen
Location
- Location within Netherlands

Zwolle is the main railway station of Zwolle in Overijssel, Netherlands. The station opened on 6 June 1864 and is on the Utrecht–Kampen railway, also known as the Centraalspoorweg, the Zwolle–Almelo railway, the Arnhem–Leeuwarden railway, the Zwolle–Stadskanaal railway and the Lelystad–Zwolle railway, also known as the Hanzelijn.

The station is a major hub for the Northern Netherlands.

== ZwolleSpoort ==
On 31 August 2010, the principal stakeholders in the railway station—ProRail, Nederlandse Spoorwegen and the municipality of Zwolle—started the ZwolleSpoort project. This project included a major renovation of the existing station, an increase in capacity and an overhaul of the entire public transportation organization in the city. The immediate starting point for the project was the Hanzelijn project, which was expected to increase passenger traffic by 33% in the period up to 2020. In order to deal with the extra traffic, the passenger tunnel (which was 5 meters wide) in the station was replaced by a new tunnel 17 meters wide and 120 meters long. The new tunnel, which opened on 26 June 2015, leads onto a new bus terminal at the southern end of the station. The tunnel also features shopping facilities.

In addition, the project entailed increasing the capacity and efficiency of the railway emplacement. The new Hanzelijn was accommodated by a new, fourth railway platform and by replacing the 34 points near the station with 15 longer ones which allow a more efficient railway pattern and allow trains to pass at higher speeds.

== Train services ==
As of 15 December 2024, the following train services call at this station:

- Express services:
  - Intercity: Schiphol, Amsterdam Zuid, Almere, Lelystad, Zwolle, Assen and Groningen
  - Intercity: Schiphol, Amsterdam Zuid, Almere, Lelystad, Zwolle, Meppel, Steenwijk, Heerenveen and Leeuwarden
  - Intercity: The Hague,, Utrecht, Amersfoort, Zwolle and Groningen
  - Intercity: The Hague, Utrecht, Amersfoort, Zwolle and Leeuwarden
  - Intercity: Zwolle, Deventer, Arnhem, Nijmegen, 's-Hertogenbosch and Roosendaal
  - Sneltrein: Zwolle, Hardenberg and Emmen
  - Sneltrein: Zwolle, Hardenberg, and Coevorden (peak hours)
- Local services:
  - Stoptrein: Zwolle, Hardenberg and Emmen
  - Sprinter: Utrecht, Amersfoort and Zwolle
  - Sprinter: Zwolle, Almelo, Hengelo and Enschede
  - Sprinter: Zwolle and Kampen
  - Sprinter: Zwolle, Meppel, Assen, and Groningen
  - Sprinter: Lelystad, Zwolle, Meppel, Steenwijk, Heerenveen and Leeuwarden

== Bus services ==
Many bus services also depart from the bus stations outside the station. These include services all over the city and regional services to Harderwijk, Apeldoorn, Urk, Steenwijk, Meppel, Coevorden, Ommen, Raalte and Deventer. NS means the service calls at the railway station.

- 1 – Stadshagen to Frankhuis, Deltion Campus, Zwolle railway station, and Oosterenk (town service)
- 2 – Ittersumbroek to Oldenerlanden, Zwolle railway station, Diezerpoort, and Holterbroek (town service)
- 3 – Zwolle railway station to Assendorp, Diezerpoort, and Berkum (town service)
- 4 – Ittersumbroek to Oldenerbroek, Schellerhoek, Zwolle railway station, Arcadia, Berkum-Brinkhoek, and AA-landen (town service)
- 5 – Zwolle railway station to Westenholte (town service)
- 7 – Zwolle railway station to Assendorp, and Oosterenk (town service)
- 8 – Zwolle railway station to Schellerlanden Campus (town service)
- 9 – Zwolle railway station to Deltion Campus (town service)
- 11 – Zwolle railway station to Stadion, and Rechterland (town service)
- 29 – Zwolle railway station to Ruitenveen, Nieuwenleusen, Balkbrug, Dedemsvaart, Lutten, Slagharen, De Krim, and Coevorden NS
- 40 – Zwolle railway station to – Lichtmis – Rouveen – Staphorst – Meppel NS – Nijeveen – Steenwijk NS
- 70 – Zwolle railway station to Genne, Hasselt, Zwartsluis, Giethoorn, and Steenwijk NS
- 71 – Zwolle railway station to Hasselt, Zwartsluis, Zieltje, St Jansklooster, Vollenhove, Marknesse, Kraggenburg, and Emmeloord
- 74 – Zwolle railway station to Hasselt, Genemuiden, IJsselmuiden, and Kampen NS
- 100 – Zwolle railway station to Oldebroek, Wezep, Elburg, and Nunspeet
- 141 – Zwolle railway station to 's-Heerenbroek, Wilsum, Kampen NS, Kampereiland, Ens, Emmelooord, Tollebeek, and Urk
- 161 – Zwolle railway station to Windesheim, Wijhe, Den Nul, Olst, Boskamp, Diepenveen, and Deventer NS
- 166 – Zwolle railway station to Wijthmen, Lenthe, Raalte, and Heino NS
- 167 – Zwolle railway station to Wijthmen, Hoonhorst, Dalfsen NS, Oudleusen, and Ommen NS
- 171 – Zwolle railway station to Hasselt, Zwartsluis, Zieltje, St Jansklooster, Vollenhove, Marknesse, and Emmeloord
- 200S – Zwolle railway station to Oldebroek, Elburg, and 't Harde (peak hours only)
- 201 – Zwolle railway station to Apeldoorn NS (express via A50 motorway)
- 203 – Zwolle railway station to Hattem, Wapenveld, Heerde, Epe, and Apeldoorn NS

== See also ==
- Railway stations in the Netherlands
- Dutch railway services
