= Friesland =

Province of the Netherlands

Friesland Friesland (Dutch) Fryslân (West Frisian)
- Province
- Province of Friesland; Provincie Friesland (Dutch); Provinsje Fryslân (West Frisian)
- Flag Coat of arms Brandmark
- Anthem: "De Alde Friezen" "The Old Frisians"
- Location of Friesland in the Netherlands

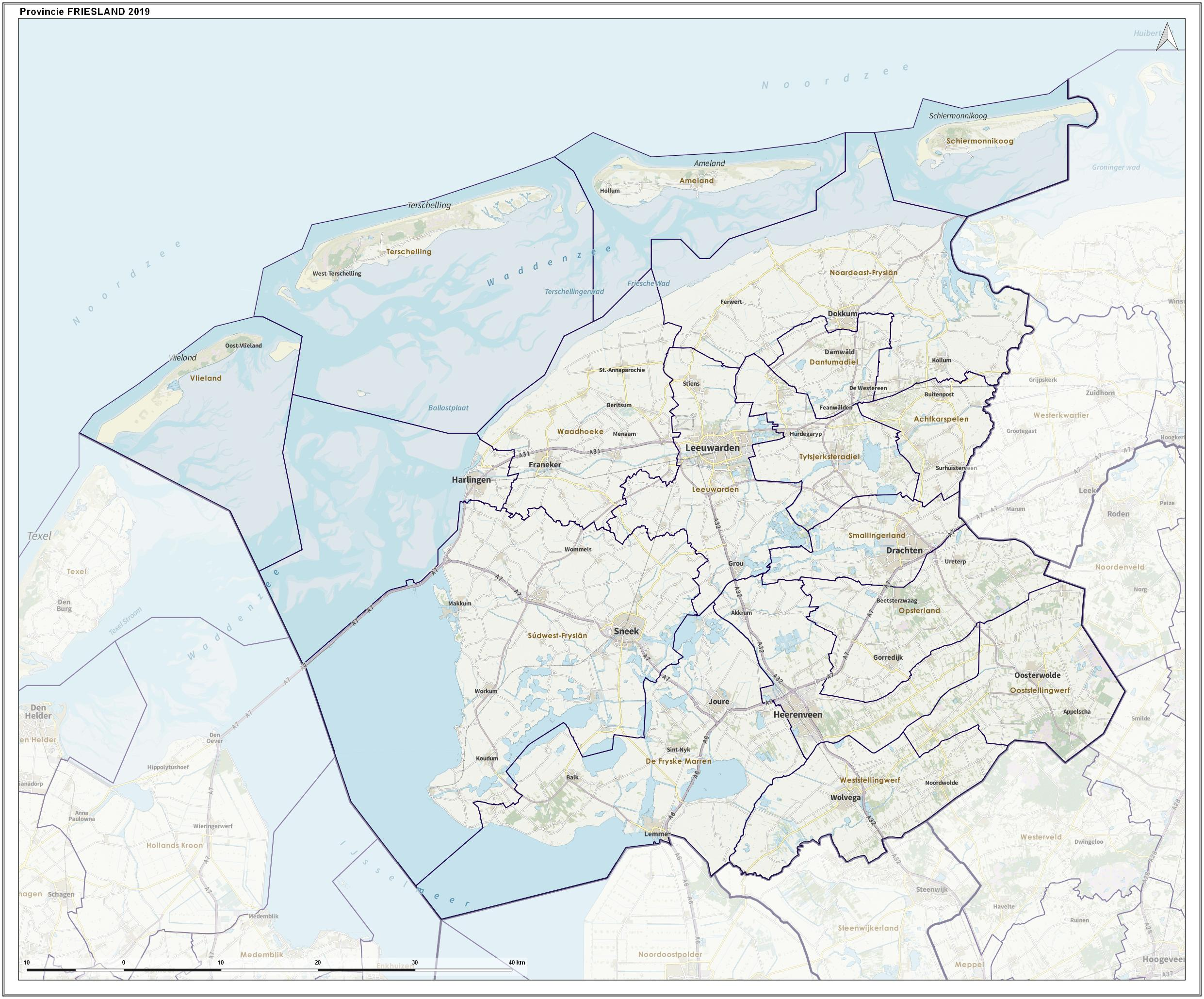
- Topography map of Friesland
- Coordinates: 53°12′05″N 5°48′00″E
- Country: Netherlands
- Capital (and largest city): Leeuwarden (Ljouwert)

Government
  - King's Commissioner: Arno Brok (VVD)
  - Council: Provincial Council of Friesland

Area (2023)
  - Total: 5,753 km^{2} (2,221 sq mi)
  - Land: 3,340 km^{2} (1,290 sq mi)
  - Water: 2,413 km^{2} (932 sq mi)
  - Rank: 1st

Population (1 January 2023)
  - Total: 659,551
  - Rank: 8th
  - Density: 197/km^{2} (510/sq mi)
  - Rank: 11th

Languages
  - Official: West Frisian • Dutch

GDP
  - Total: €30.149 billion (2024)
  - Per capita: €45,405 (2024)
- Time zone: UTC+1 (CET)
  - Summer (DST): UTC+2 (CEST)
- ISO 3166 code: NL-FR
- Religion (2015): No religion 57.2% Protestant 28.5% Roman Catholic 6.6% Other 6.5%
- HDI (2022): 0.923 very high · 12th
- Website: www.fryslan.frl

Friesland (/ˈfriːzlənd/ FREEZ-lənd; Dutch: [ˈfrislɑnt]; official West Frisian: Fryslân [ˈfrislɔ̃ːn]), historically and traditionally known as Frisia (/ˈfriːʒə/), is a province of the Netherlands located in the north of the country. As of January 2023, the province had a population of about 660,000, and a total area of 5,753 km^{2} (2,221 sq mi).

The land is mostly made up of grassland and has numerous lakes. The area of the province was once part of the ancient, larger region of Frisia, which gave the province its name. Friesland today is the home of the Netherlands's ethnic Frisian people. The official languages of Friesland are West Frisian and Dutch, and almost all West Frisian speakers are bilingual with Dutch.

The province is divided into 18 municipalities. The capital and seat of the provincial government is the city of Leeuwarden (West Frisian: Ljouwert, Liwwaddes: Liwwadde), a city with 123,107 inhabitants. Other large municipalities in Friesland are Sneek (pop. 33,512), Heerenveen (pop. 50,257), and Smallingerland (includes town of Drachten, pop. 55,938). Since 2017, Arno Brok is the King's Commissioner in the province. A coalition of the Christian Democratic Appeal, the People's Party for Freedom and Democracy, the Labour Party, and the Frisian National Party forms the executive branch.

== Toponymy ==
In 1996, the Provincial Council of Friesland resolved that the official name of the province should follow the West Frisian spelling rather than the Dutch spelling, resulting in "Friesland" being replaced by "Fryslân". In 2004, the Dutch government confirmed this resolution, putting in place a three-year scheme to oversee the name change and associated cultural programme.

The province of Friesland is occasionally referred to as "Frisia" by, amongst others, Hanno Brand, head of the history and literature department at the Fryske Akademy since 2009. However, the English-language webpage of the Friesland Provincial Council refers to the province as "Fryslân".

== History ==
=== Prehistory ===
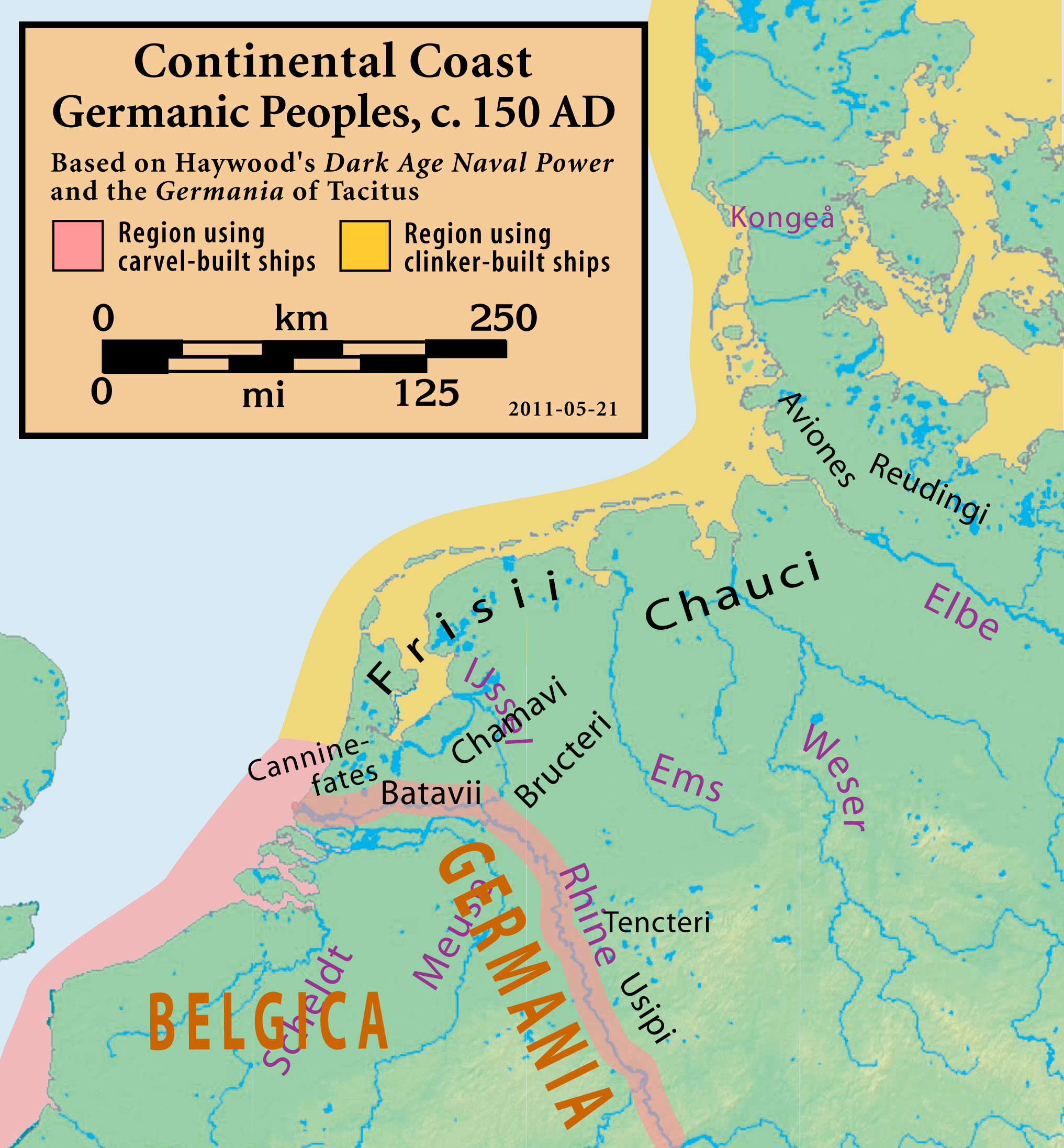
Map of the North Sea coast, c. 150 AD. (erroneously shows late 20th century land masses)

The Frisii were among the migrating Germanic tribes that, following the breakup of Celtic Europe in the 4th century BC, settled along the North Sea. They came to control the area from roughly present-day Bremen to Bruges, and conquered many of the smaller offshore islands. What little is known of the Frisii is provided by a few Roman accounts, most of them military. Pliny the Elder said their lands were forest-covered with tall trees growing up to the edge of the lakes. They lived by agriculture and raising cattle.

In his Germania, Tacitus described all the Germanic peoples of the region as having elected kings with limited powers and influential military leaders who led by example rather than by authority. The people lived in spread-out settlements. He specifically noted the weakness of Germanic political hierarchies in reference to the Frisii, when he mentioned the names of two kings of the 1st century Frisii and added that they were kings "as far as the Germans are under kings".

In the 1st century BC, the Frisii halted a Roman advance and thus managed to maintain their independence. Some or all of the Frisii may have joined into the Frankish and Saxon peoples in late Roman times, but they would retain a separate identity in Roman eyes until at least 296, when they were forcibly resettled as laeti (Roman-era serfs) and thereafter disappear from recorded history. Their tentative existence in the 4th century is confirmed by archaeological discovery of a type of earthenware unique to 4th-century Frisia, called terp Tritzum, showing that an unknown number of Frisii were resettled in Flanders and Kent, likely as laeti under the aforementioned Roman coercion. The lands of the Frisii were largely abandoned by c. 400 as a result of the conflicts of the Migration Period, climate deterioration, and the flooding caused by a rise in the sea level.

=== Early Middle Ages ===
The Frisian realm in 716 AD. The Frisian Kingdom covered only the western part of the area.

The area lay empty for one or two centuries, when changing environmental and political conditions made the region habitable again. At that time, during the Migration Period, "new" Frisians (probably descended from a merging of Frisii, Angles, Saxons and Jutes) repopulated the coastal regions. These Frisians consisted of tribes with loose bonds, centred on war bands under the rule of local chiefs or kings but without great power. The earliest Frisian records name four social classes, the 'ethelings (nobiles in Latin documents; adel in Dutch and German) and frilings (vrijen in Dutch and Freien in German), who together made up the "Free Frisians" who might bring suit at court, and the laten or liten with the slaves, who were absorbed into the laten during the Early Middle Ages, as slavery was not so much formally abolished, as evaporated. (Note: Homans describes Frisian social institutions, based on the summary by Siebs, Benno E. (1933). Grundlagen und Aufbau der altfriesischen Verfassung. Untersuchungen zur deutschen staats- und Rechtsgeschichte (in German). Vol. 144. Breslau: Marcus. OCLC 604057407. Siebs' synthesis was extrapolated from survivals detected in later medieval documents.) The laten were tenants of lands they did not own and might be tied to it in the manner of serfs, but in later times might buy their freedom.

Under the rule of King Aldgisl, the Frisians came in conflict with the Frankish mayor of the palace Ebroin, over the old Roman border fortifications. Aldgisl could keep the Franks at a distance with his army. During the reign of Redbad, the tide turned in favour of the Franks; in 690, the Franks were victorious in the Battle of Dorestad. Radboud, however, made a successful comeback. He entered into an alliance with Pepin and, after Pepin's death, aligned himself with the mayor of the palace Ragenfrid. In 716 he defeated Charles Martel's army in the Battle of Cologne. Three years later he died suddenly.

The location and extent of the Frisian kingdom remain a matter of debate. Twentieth‑century scholarship established that the kings Aldgisl and Radbod had their main power base in western Frisia (in what is now Holland). More recent research, however, suggests that their authority may have extended over all of Frisia, possibly making them overlords of the entire region, including the area of the modern province of Friesland.

In 733, Charles Martel sent an army against the Frisians. The Frisian army was pushed back to Eastergoa. The next year the Battle of the Boarn took place. Charles ferried an army across the Almere with a fleet that enabled him to sail up to De Boarn. The Frisians were defeated in the ensuing battle, and their last king Poppo was killed. The victors began plundering and burning heathen sanctuaries. Charles Martel returned with much loot, and broke the power of the Frisian kings for good. The Franks annexed the Frisian lands between the Vlie and the Lauwers. They conquered the area east of the Lauwers in 785, when Charlemagne defeated Widukind. The Carolingians laid Frisia under the rule of grewan, a title that has been loosely related to count in its early sense of "governor" rather than "feudal overlord". About 100,000 Dutch drowned in a flood in 1228.

=== Frisian freedom ===
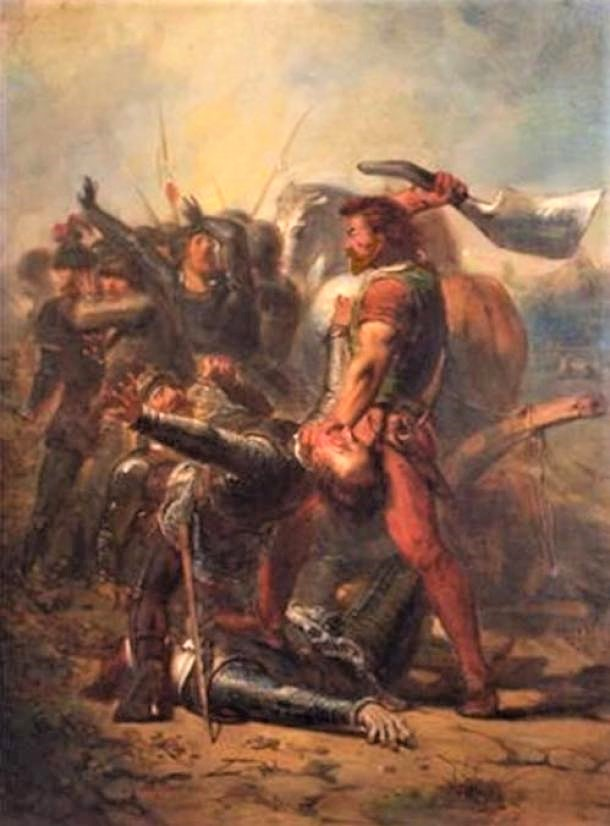
Pier Gerlofs Donia in 1516 as depicted in a 19th-century painting by Johannes Hinderikus Egenberger

Around 800, when the Scandinavian Vikings first attacked Frisia, which was still under Carolingian rule, the Frisians were released from military service on foreign territory in order to be able to defend themselves against the heathen Vikings. With their victory in the Battle of Norditi in 884 they were able to drive the Vikings permanently out of East Frisia, although it remained under constant threat. Over the centuries, whilst feudal lords reigned in the rest of Europe, no aristocratic structures emerged in Frisia. This 'Frisian freedom' was represented abroad by redjeven who were elected from among the wealthier farmers or from elected representatives of the autonomous rural municipalities. Originally the redjeven were all judges, so-called Asega, who were appointed by the territorial lords.

After significant territories were lost to Holland in the Friso-Hollandic Wars, Frisia saw an economic downturn in the mid-14th century. Accompanied by a decline in monasteries and other communal institutions, social discord led to the emergence of untitled nobles called haadlingen ("headmen"), wealthy landowners possessing large tracts of land and fortified homes who took over the role of the judiciary as well as offering protection to their local inhabitants. Internal struggles between regional leaders resulted in bloody conflicts and the alignment of regions along two opposing parties: the Fetkeapers and Skieringers. On 21 March 1498, a small group of Skieringers from Westergo secretly met with Albert III, Duke of Saxony, the Governor of the Habsburg Netherlands, in Medemblik requesting his help. Albrecht, who had gained a reputation as a formidable military commander, accepted and soon conquered all Friesland. Emperor Maximilian of Habsburg appointed Albrecht hereditary potestate and gubernator of Friesland in 1499.

In 1515, an army of haadlingen and peasants, with the help of mercenaries known as the Arumer Zwarte Hoop, started a fight for freedom from oppression by the Habsburg authorities. One of the leaders was Pier Gerlofs Donia, whose farm had been burned down and whose kinfolk had been killed by a marauding Landsknecht regiment. Since the regiment had been employed by the Habsburg authorities to suppress the civil war of the Fetkeapers and Skieringers, Donia put the blame on the authorities. After this he gathered angry peasants and some petty noblemen from Frisia and Gelderland and formed the Arumer Zwarte Hoop.The rebels received financial support from Charles II, Duke of Guelders, who claimed the Duchy of Guelders in opposition to the House of Habsburg. Charles also employed mercenaries under command of his military commander Maarten van Rossum in their support. However, when the tides turned against the rebels after the Donia's death in 1520, Charles withdrew his support, without which the rebels could no longer afford to pay their mercenary army. The revolt was put to an end in 1523 and Frisia was incorporated into the Habsburg Netherlands, bringing an end to the Frisian freedom.

=== Modern times ===
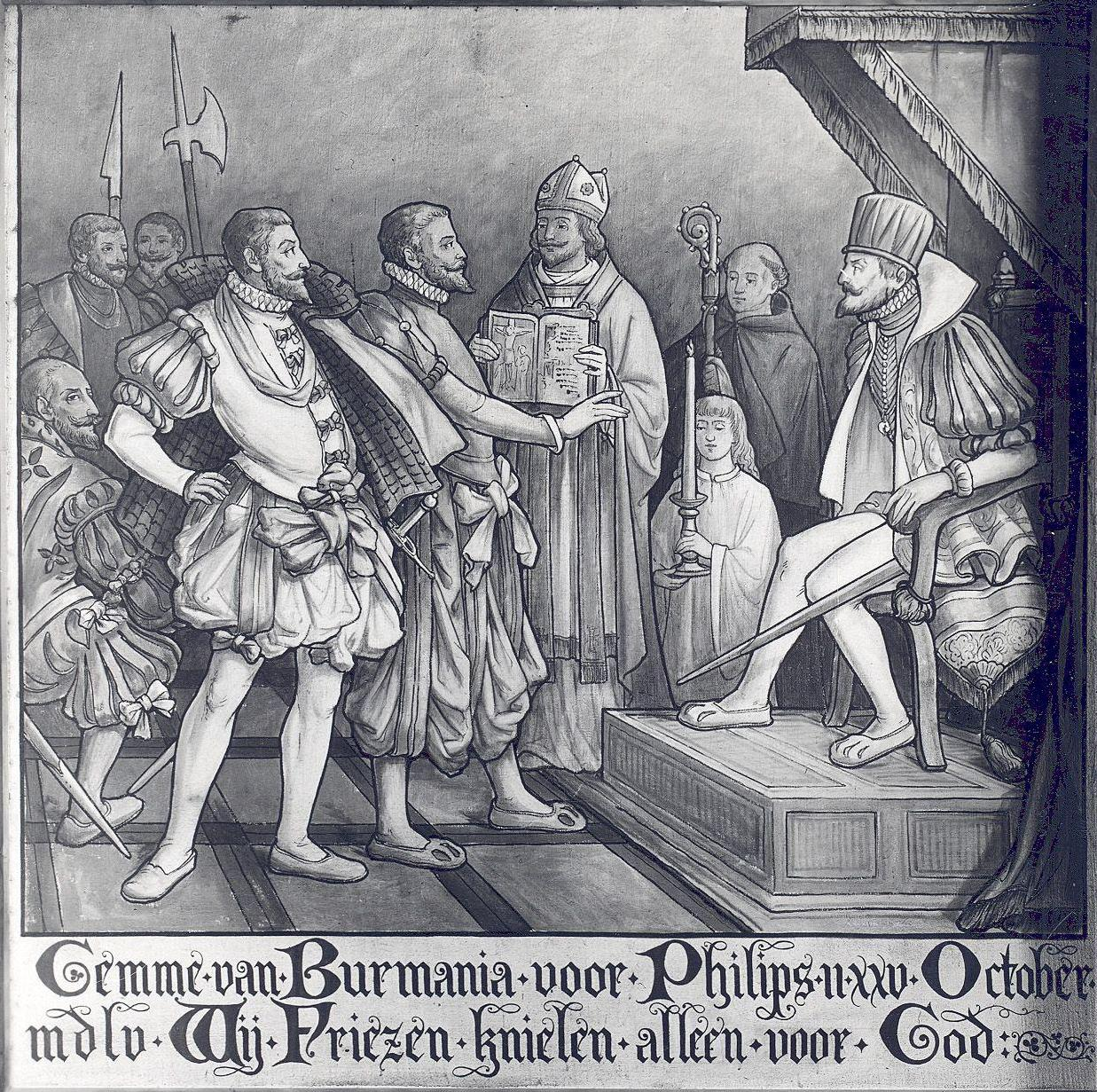
The Frisian representative refusing to kneel before Philip II at his coronation

Charles V, the Holy Roman Emperor, became the first lord of the Lordship of Frisia. He appointed Georg Schenck van Toutenburg, who had crushed the peasants' revolt, as Stadtholder to rule over the province in his stead. When Charles abdicated in 1556, Frisia was inherited by Philip II of Spain along with the rest of the Netherlands. In 1566, Frisia joined the Dutch Revolt against Spanish rule.

In 1577, George de Lalaing, Count of Rennenberg was appointed Stadtholder of Frisia and other provinces. A moderate, trusted by both sides, he tried to reconcile the rebels with the Crown. But in 1580, Rennenburg declared for Spain. The States of Frisia raised troops and took his strongholds of Leeuwarden, Harlingen and Stavoren. Rennenburg was deposed and Frisia became the fifth Lordship to join the rebels' Union of Utrecht. From 1580 onward, all stadtholders were members of the House of Orange-Nassau. With the Peace of Münster in 1648, Frisia became a full member of the independent Dutch Republic, a federation of provincies. In economic and therefore also political importance, Friesland was next in rank to the provinces of Holland and Zeeland.

In 1798, three years after the Batavian Revolution, the provincial lordship of Frisia was abolished and its territory was divided between the Eems and Oude IJssel departments. This was short-lived, however, as Frisia was revived as a department in 1802. When the Netherlands were annexed by the First French Empire in 1810, the department was in French renamed Frise. After Napoleon was defeated in 1813 and a new constitution was introduced in 1814, Friesland became a province of the Sovereign Principality of the United Netherlands, then of the unitary Kingdom of the Netherlands a year later.

== Geography ==
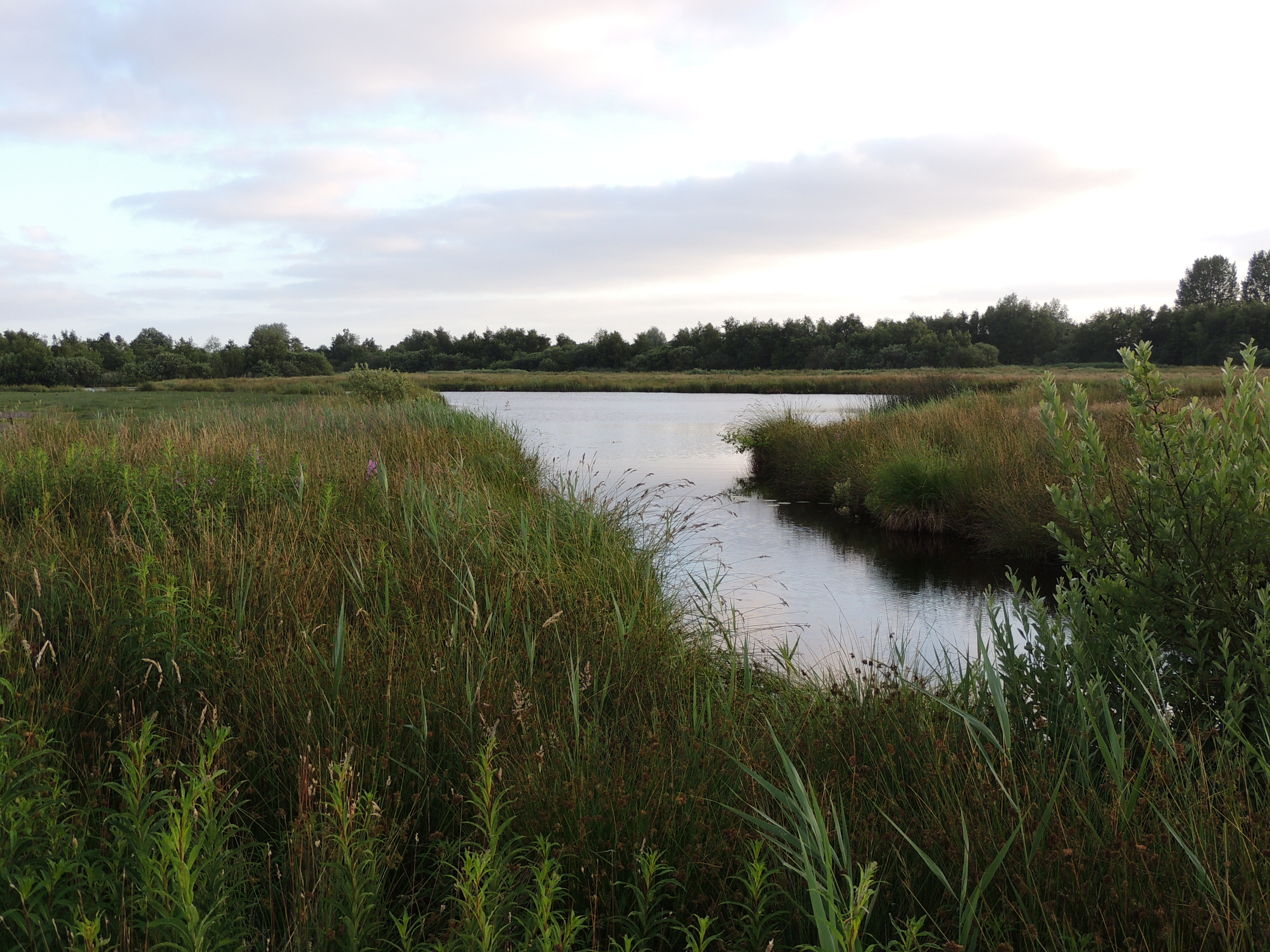
De Alde Feanen National Park

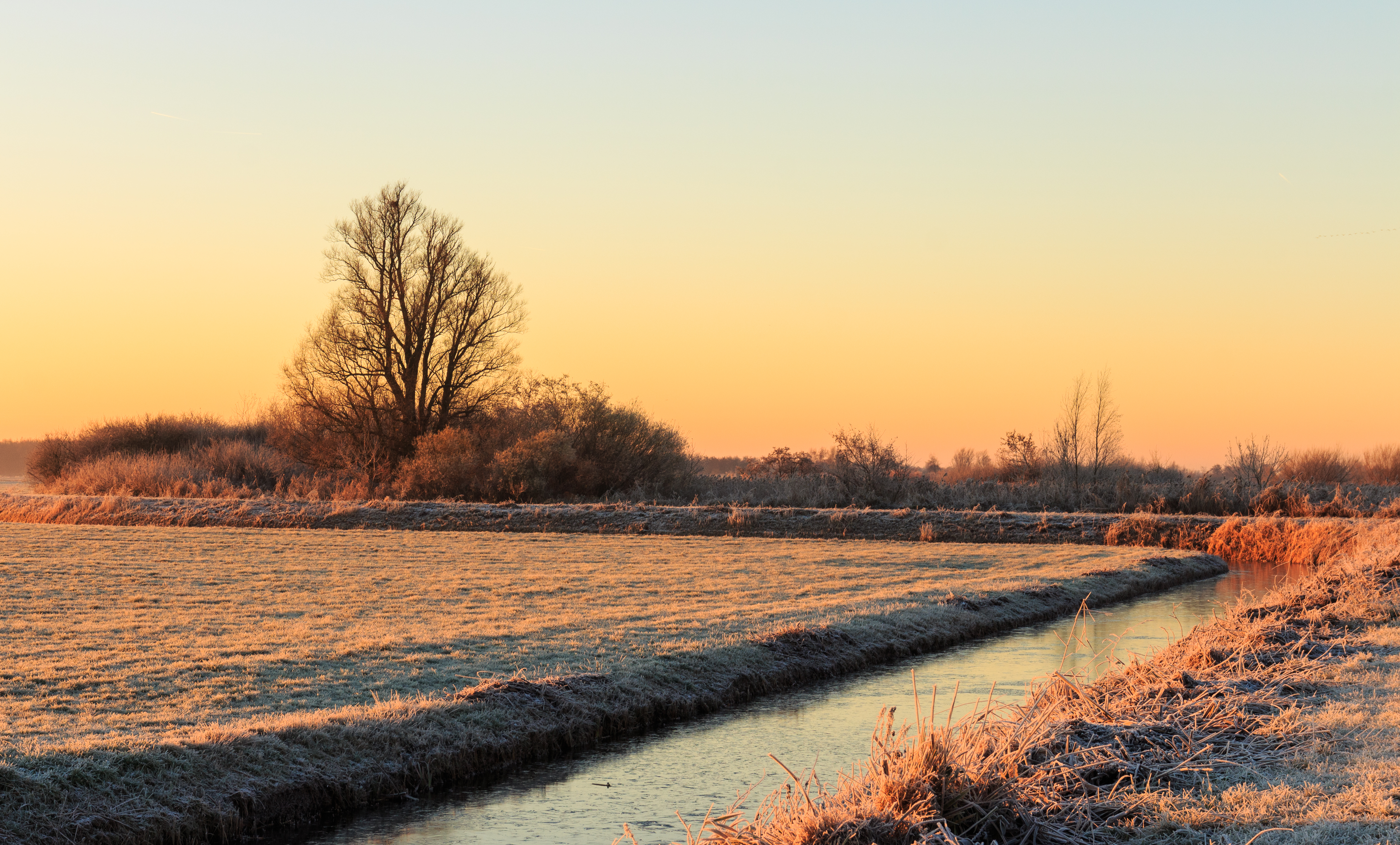
De Fryske Marren

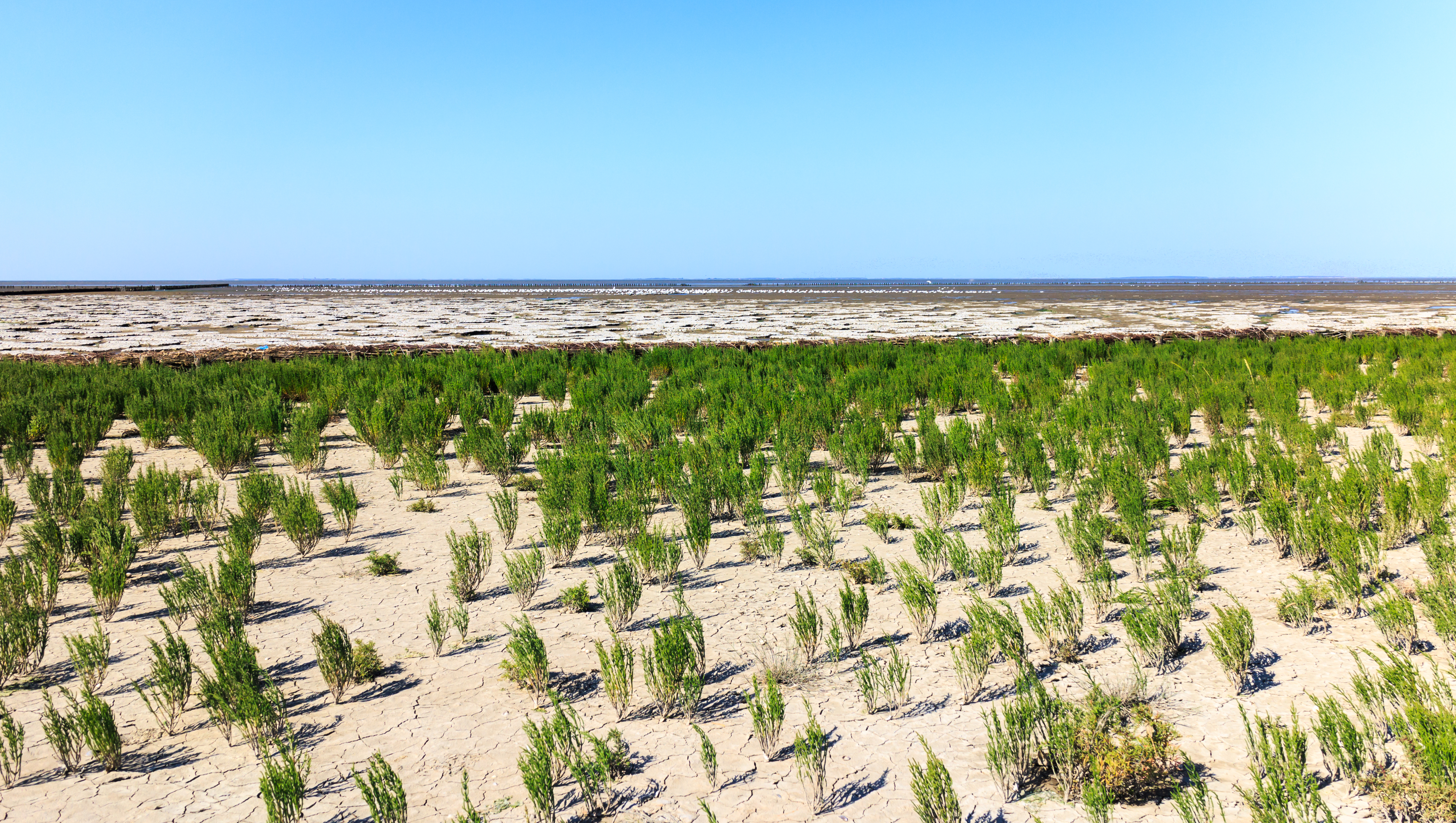
Wadden Sea

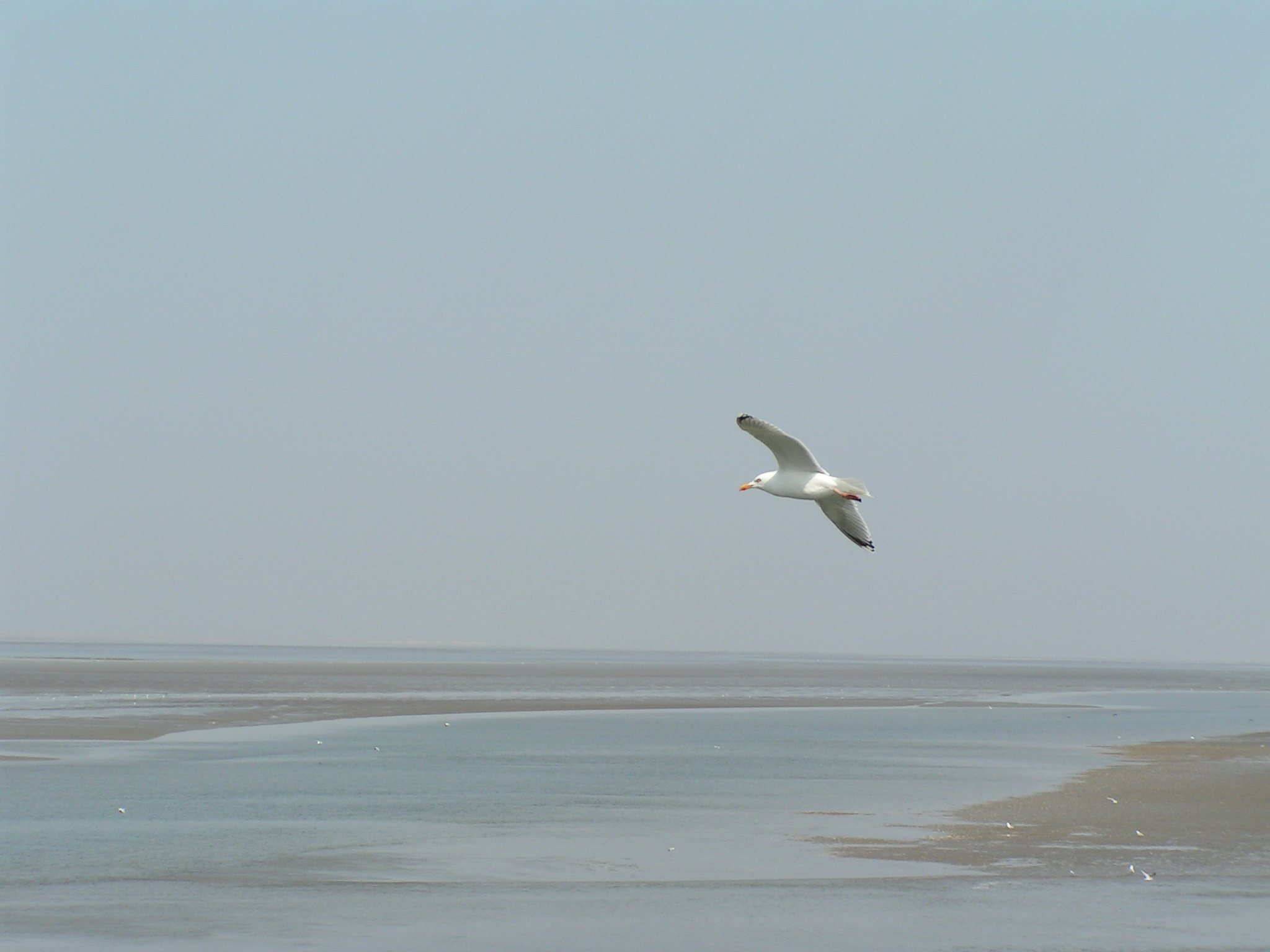
View of the northern coast of Friesland

Satellite image of Friesland

Friesland is situated at 53°8′N 5°49′E in the northwest of the Netherlands, west of the province of Groningen, northwest of Drenthe and Overijssel, north of Flevoland, northeast of the IJsselmeer and North Holland, and south of the North Sea. It is the largest province of the Netherlands if one includes areas of water; in terms of land area only, it is the third-largest province.

Most of Friesland is on the mainland, but it also includes a number of West Frisian Islands, including Vlieland, Terschelling, Ameland and Schiermonnikoog, which are connected to the mainland by ferry. The province's highest point is a dune at 45 metres (148 ft) above sea level, on the island of Vlieland.

Four national parks of the Netherlands are located in Friesland: Schiermonnikoog, De Alde Feanen, Lauwersmeer (partially in Groningen), and Drents-Friese Wold (also partially situated in Drenthe).

=== Urban areas ===
The ten urban areas in Friesland with the largest population are:

Dutch name	Frisian name	Population
Leeuwarden	Ljouwert	92,235
Drachten	Drachten	45,080
Sneek	Snits	33,960
Heerenveen	It Hearrenfean	30,567
Harlingen	Harns	14,660
Wolvega	Wolvegea	13,500
Joure	De Jouwer	13,070
Franeker	Frjentsjer	12,810
Dokkum	Dokkum	12,575
Lemmer	De Lemmer	10,315

=== Municipalities ===
The province is divided into 18 municipalities, each with local government (municipal council, mayor and aldermen).

Municipality	Population	Total area		Population density		COROP
Municipality	Population	km^{2}	sq mi	/km^{2}	/sq mi	COROP
Achtkarspelen	27,900	103.98	40.15	273	710	North Friesland
Ameland	3,746	268.50	103.67	63	160	North Friesland
Dantumadiel	18,943	87.53	33.80	224	580	North Friesland
De Fryske Marren	51,778	559.93	216.19	147	380	South West Friesland
Harlingen	15,807	387.67	149.68	633	1,640	North Friesland
Heerenveen	50,650	198.17	76.51	266	690	South East Friesland
Leeuwarden	124,481	255.62	98.70	522	1,350	North Friesland
Noardeast-Fryslân	45,481	516.45	199.40	120	310	North Friesland
Ooststellingwerf	25,464	226.11	87.30	114	300	South East Friesland
Opsterland	29,812	227.64	87.89	133	340	South East Friesland
Schiermonnikoog	931	199.07	76.86	23	60	North Friesland
Smallingerland	56,040	126.17	48.71	478	1,240	South East Friesland
Súdwest-Fryslân	89,999	907.87	350.53	172	450	South West Friesland
Terschelling	4,870	673.99	260.23	57	150	North Friesland
Tytsjerksteradiel	32,060	161.41	62.32	215	560	North Friesland
Vlieland	1,194	315.80	121.93	30	78	North Friesland
Waadhoeke	46,149	315.26	121.72	162	420	North Friesland
Weststellingwerf	26,130	228.45	88.21	119	310	South East Friesland

=== Climate ===
The province of Friesland, like the rest of the Netherlands, has an oceanic climate (Köppen: Cfb).

Climate data for Leeuwarden
Month	Jan	Feb	Mar	Apr	May	Jun	Jul	Aug	Sep	Oct	Nov	Dec	Year
Record high °C (°F)	12.6 (54.7)	14.4 (57.9)	20.4 (68.7)	26.0 (78.8)	28.7 (83.7)	32.5 (90.5)	31.4 (88.5)	32.8 (91.0)	29.1 (84.4)	23.8 (74.8)	16.4 (61.5)	14.2 (57.6)	32.8 (91.0)
Mean daily maximum °C (°F)	4.9 (40.8)	5.4 (41.7)	8.6 (47.5)	12.4 (54.3)	16.2 (61.2)	18.5 (65.3)	21.0 (69.8)	21.1 (70.0)	18.0 (64.4)	13.7 (56.7)	9.0 (48.2)	5.6 (42.1)	12.9 (55.2)
Daily mean °C (°F)	2.7 (36.9)	2.7 (36.9)	5.3 (41.5)	8.2 (46.8)	12.0 (53.6)	14.6 (58.3)	17.0 (62.6)	16.9 (62.4)	14.2 (57.6)	10.5 (50.9)	6.5 (43.7)	3.3 (37.9)	9.5 (49.1)
Mean daily minimum °C (°F)	0.1 (32.2)	−0.2 (31.6)	1.9 (35.4)	3.8 (38.8)	7.4 (45.3)	10.2 (50.4)	12.6 (54.7)	12.5 (54.5)	10.2 (50.4)	7.1 (44.8)	3.6 (38.5)	0.6 (33.1)	5.8 (42.4)
Record low °C (°F)	−19.9 (−3.8)	−16.3 (2.7)	−16.3 (2.7)	−5.9 (21.4)	−1.7 (28.9)	1.3 (34.3)	5.7 (42.3)	5.4 (41.7)	2.0 (35.6)	−6.0 (21.2)	−14.2 (6.4)	−19.2 (−2.6)	−19.9 (−3.8)
Average precipitation mm (inches)	68.9 (2.71)	51.1 (2.01)	58.1 (2.29)	38.2 (1.50)	57.3 (2.26)	68.2 (2.69)	74.5 (2.93)	82.7 (3.26)	84.3 (3.32)	81.4 (3.20)	82.1 (3.23)	73.0 (2.87)	819.8 (32.28)
Source: Royal Netherlands Meteorological Institute

== Demography ==
In 2023, Friesland had a population of 659,551 and a population density of 197/km^{2} (510/sq mi).

The years 1880–1900 show slower population growth due to an agricultural recession during which some 20,000 Frisians emigrated to the United States.

Historical population of Friesland

Year	Population
1714	129,243
1748	135,195
1796	161,513
1811	175,366
1830	204,909
1840	227,859
1850	243,191
1860	269,701
1870	300,863
1880	329,877
1890	335,558
1900	340,263

Year	Population
1910	363,625
1920	385,362
1930	402,051
1940	424,462
1950	465,267
1960	478,206
1970	521,820
1982	592,314
1990	599,151
1999	621,222
2010	646,305
2020	649,944

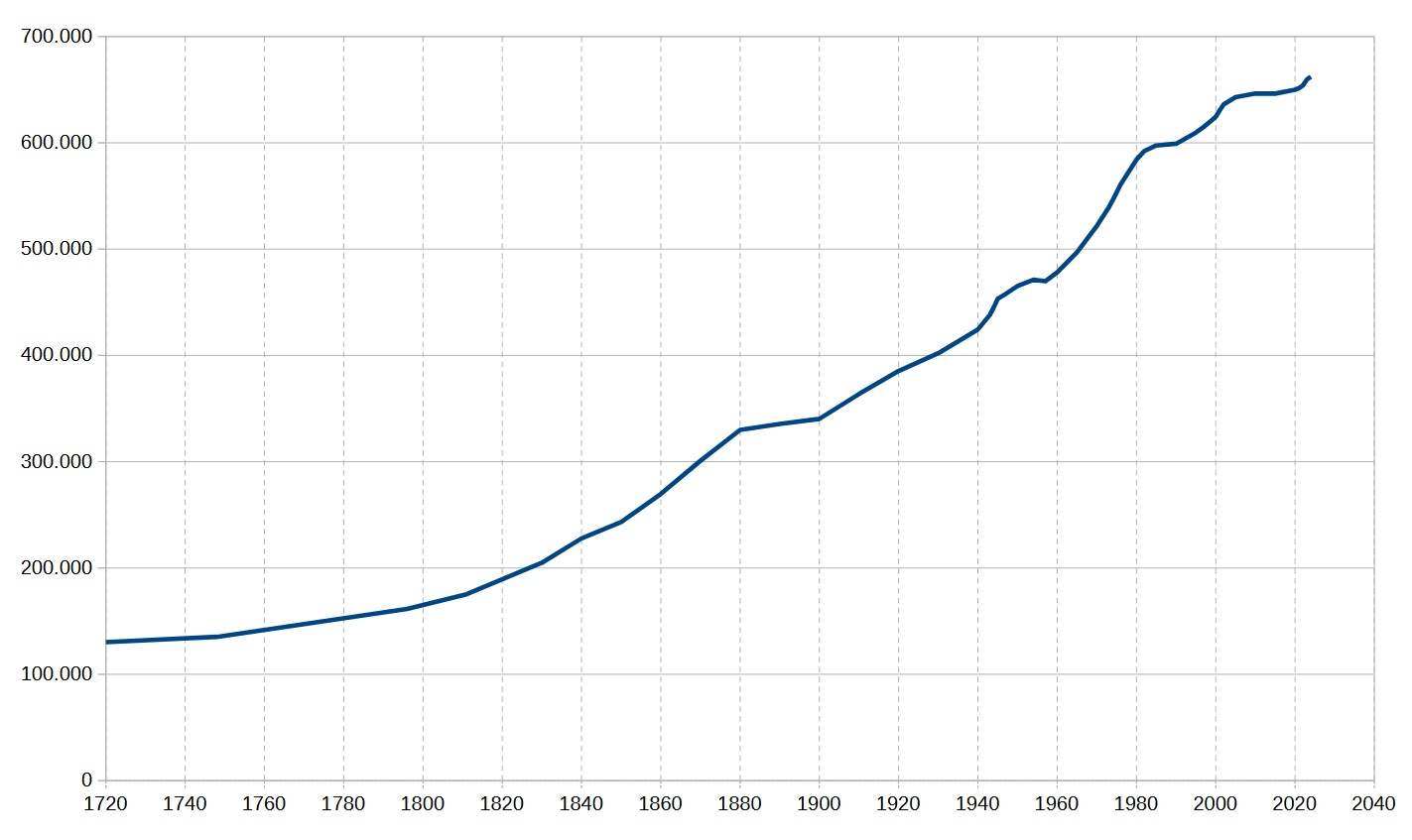

=== Anthropometry ===
Since the late Middle Ages, Friesland has been renowned for the exceptional height of its inhabitants. Even early Renaissance poet Dante Alighieri refers to the height of Frisians in his Divine Comedy when, in the canticle about Hell, he talks about the magnitude of an infernal demon by stating that "not even three tall Frieslanders, were they set one upon the other, would have matched his height".

== Religion ==
Religion in Friesland (2015)
1. Not religious (57.2%)
2. Protestantism (28.5%)
3. Catholicism (6.60%)
4. Other (6.50%)
5. Islam (1.10%)

In 2015, 28.5% of the population belonged to the Protestant Church in the Netherlands, while 6.6% were Roman Catholic, 1.1% were Muslim and 6.5% belonged to other churches or faiths. Over half of the population (57.2%) identified as non-religious, above the national average.

Religiosity and Christian denominations by municipality (2015) (% per local population)
Municipality	Religious (total)	Protestant			Catholic Church
Municipality	Religious (total)	Protestant Church (PKN)	Dutch Reformed (NHK)	Reformed Churches	Catholic Church
Achtkarspelen	60.7	21.1	9.9	18.0	1.6
Dantumadiel	60.6	13.6	14.6	23.3	1.4
Dongeradeel	70.7	33.6	11.3	16.6	3.4
De Fryske Marren	54.0	15.4	11.4	5.6	16.1
Ferwerderadiel	58.6	32.6	5.2	14.3	2.6
Franekeradeel	40.8	15.0	11.6	6.2	5.9
Harlingen	34.2	4.1	6.6	9.2	7.1
Heerenveen	33.2	10.4	6.3	4.2	5.9
Het Bildt	44.3	14.7	13.8	10.5	3.0
Kollumerland en Nieuwkruisland	61.8	22.8	13.5	20.7	0.6
Leeuwarden	31.2	9.6	3.9	3.3	5.7
Leeuwarderadeel	41.5	15.6	8.2	10.7	1.5
Littenseradiel	39.6	10.0	15.9	3.4	6.7
Menameradiel	48.0	18.7	11.4	5.2	9.2
Ooststellingwerf	37.2	13.8	6.0	7.2	7.5
Opsterland	38.7	16.7	9.4	6.8	2.2
Smallingerland	45.0	14.2	6.3	12.4	2.4
Súdwest-Fryslân	52.1	15.9	10.7	5.9	11.7
Tytsjerksteradiel	52.2	21.0	8.4	12.6	4.0
Weststellingwerf	40.3	8.9	12.0	1.3	12.6

== Economy ==
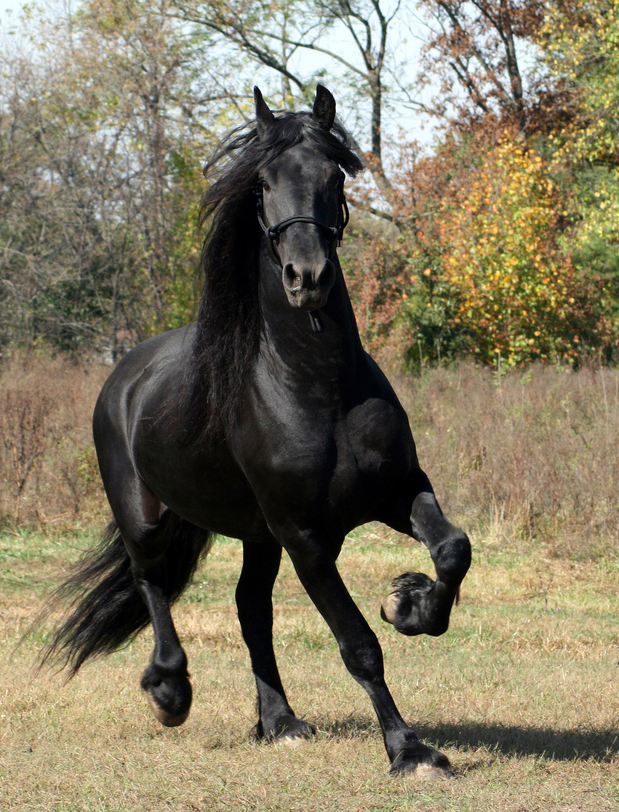
Friesian horse

Friesland is mainly an agricultural province. The black and white Frisian cattle, black and white Stabyhoun and the black Frisian horse originated here. Tourism is another important source of income: the principal tourist destinations include the lakes in the southwest of the province and the islands in the Wadden Sea to the north. There are 195 windmills in the province of Friesland, out of a total of about 1200 in the entire country.

The gross domestic product (GDP) of the region was €19.8 billion in 2018, accounting for 2.6% of the Netherlands economic output. GDP per capita adjusted for purchasing power was €26,700, or 89% of the EU27 average in the same year.

== Culture ==
=== Languages ===
A West Frisian speaker, recorded in the Netherlands.

Friesland is one of the 12 provinces of the Netherlands to have its national language that is recognized as such, West Frisian. Before the 18th century, varieties of Frisian were also spoken in the provinces of North Holland and Groningen, and together with the Frisian speakers in East Friesland and North Friesland a continuous linguistic area existed between Amsterdam and the present day Danish-German border.

The mutual intelligibility in reading between Dutch and Frisian is limited. A cloze test in 2005 revealed native Dutch speakers understood 31.9% of a West Frisian newspaper, 66.4% of an Afrikaans newspaper and 97.1% of a Dutch newspaper. In 2007, West Frisian is the native language of 54.3% of the inhabitants of the province of Friesland, followed by Dutch with 34.7%, and speakers of other regional languages, most of these restricted to Friesland, with 9.7%, and in the end other foreign languages with 1.4%. Frisian speakers are traditionally underrepresented in urban areas, and predominant in the countryside.

West Frisian is also spoken in a small adjacent part of the province of Groningen. Up to the 18th century Frisian was spoken in the, at that time Prussian and Hanoverian, lordships of East Friesland). Since then the East Frisian population switched to East Frisian (Ostfriesisch), a Low German dialect. Only in some, formerly remoted, East Frisian villages (Saterland) a variety of historically East Frisian (Seeltersk) is still in use but by an older generation. A collection of dialects named North Frisian, is or was spoken in North Friesland, alongside the North Sea coast and on the islands of Schleswig-Holstein. The named Frisian languages are historically related to Old English, which points towards the fact that Angles and Saxons, eventually accompanied by Frisians, came from these areas.

In Stellingwerf, in south-east Friesland, a dialect of Low Saxon is spoken, as is in the northeast in Kollumerpomp.

In the former municipality of het Bildt the Hollandic dialect of Bildts is spoken. It contains a lot of Frisian influence. In most of the cities of Leeuwarden, Town Frisian is spoken. As with Bildts, these variants are Hollandic dialects with Frisian influence.

The language policy in Friesland is preservation. West Frisian is a mandatory subject in Friesland in primary and secondary schools of the Frisian speaking districts. Bilingual (Dutch–Frisian) and trilingual (Dutch–English–Frisian) schools in the province of Friesland use West Frisian as a language of instruction in some lessons, besides Dutch in most other lessons and alongside them English. Literacy in Frisian however, is not often a core aim and that makes the number of Frisians speakers able to write in Frisian only 12%.

The provincial government takes various initiatives to preserve the West Frisian language. All parents in Friesland receive, at their children's birth, information about language and multilingualism (e.g. 'taaltaske'). To support the use of Frisian in public and at public events, the province also invests in the development of speech pathology materials and strives to create information technology devices for the West Frisian language. The Frisian government subsidizes the Afûk organization, which offers language courses and actively promotes Frisian in all sectors of society as well as the corporate domain which as a rule is dominated by Dutch and English. The province also promotes a wide range of art and entertainment in Frisian.

=== Sports ===
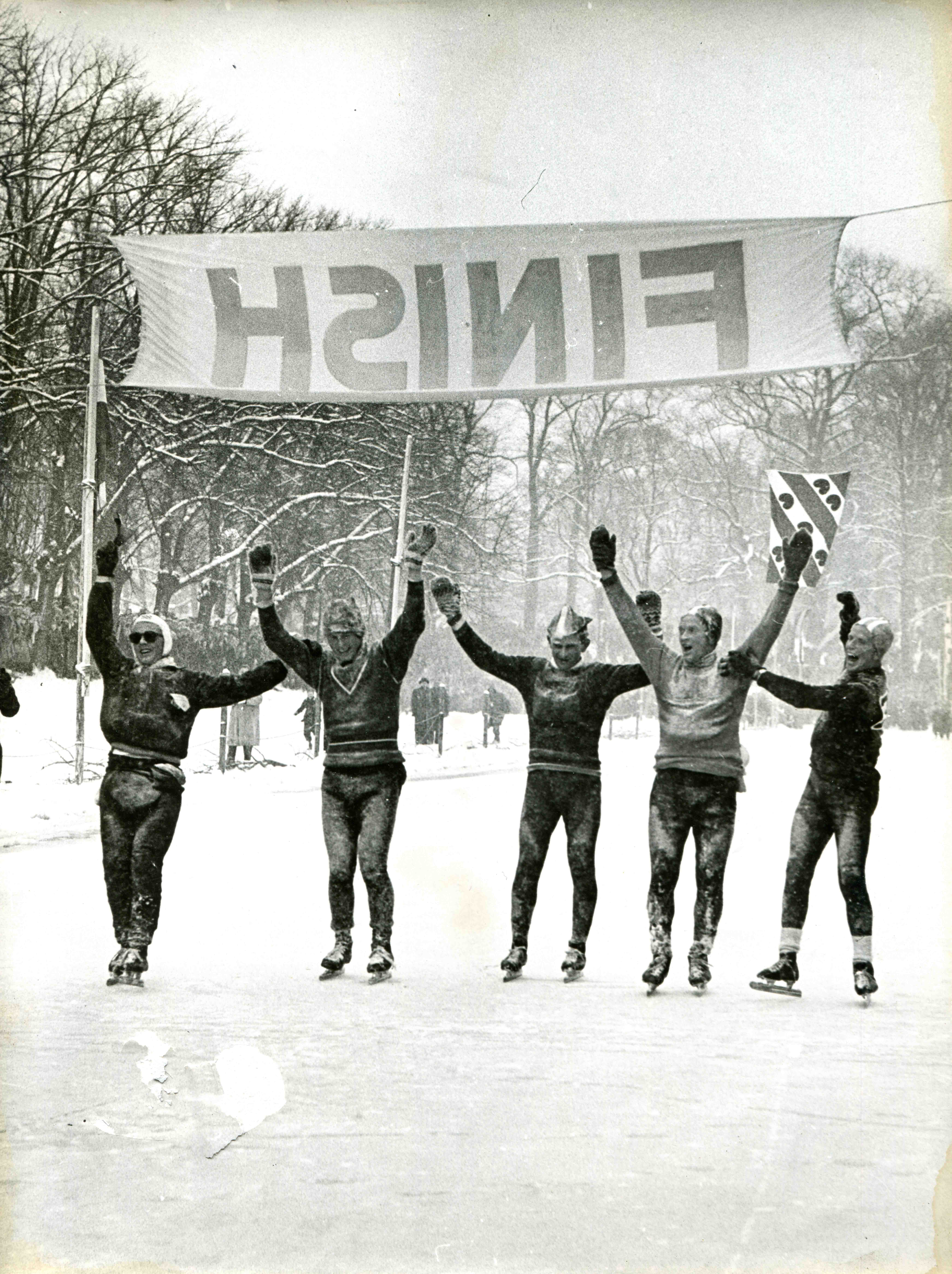
Finish of the Elfstedentocht in 1956

The province is famous for its speed skaters, with mass participation in cross-country ice skating when weather conditions permit. When winters are cold enough to allow the freshwater canals to freeze hard, the province holds its traditional Elfstedentocht (Eleven cities tour), a 200-kilometre (120 mi) ice skating tour. A traditional sport is Frisian handball. Another Frisian practice is fierljeppen, a sport with some similarities to pole vaulting. A jump consists of an intense sprint to the pole (polsstok), jumping and grabbing it, then climbing to the top while trying to control the pole's forward and lateral movements over a body of water and finishing with a graceful landing on a sand bed opposite to the starting point. Because of all the diverse skills required in fierljeppen, fierljeppers are considered to be very complete athletes with superbly developed strength and coordination. In the warmer months, many Frisians practice wadlopen, the traditional art of wading across designated sections of the Wadden Sea at low tide. Friesland also hosts regattas featuring skûtsjes, local sailing barges, such as the annual Skûtsjesilen on its lakes.

There are currently two professional football clubs playing in Friesland: SC Cambuur from Leeuwarden (home stadium Kooi Stadion) and SC Heerenveen (home stadium Abe Lenstra Stadion), both active in the top level Eredivisie.

=== Music ===
Music in Friesland (Friese Muziek) reflects the region’s distinct cultural and linguistic identity, blending folk traditions, regional language and modern influences.

Friesland has been made more popular in the media thanks to Fryslân musician and rapper Joost Klein, who participated in the Eurovision Song Contest in 2024. He has released a number of songs about his home province, such as a cover of the 1993 song Friesenjung (lit. 'Frisian boy') and also often mentions it in his lyrics.

== Politics ==
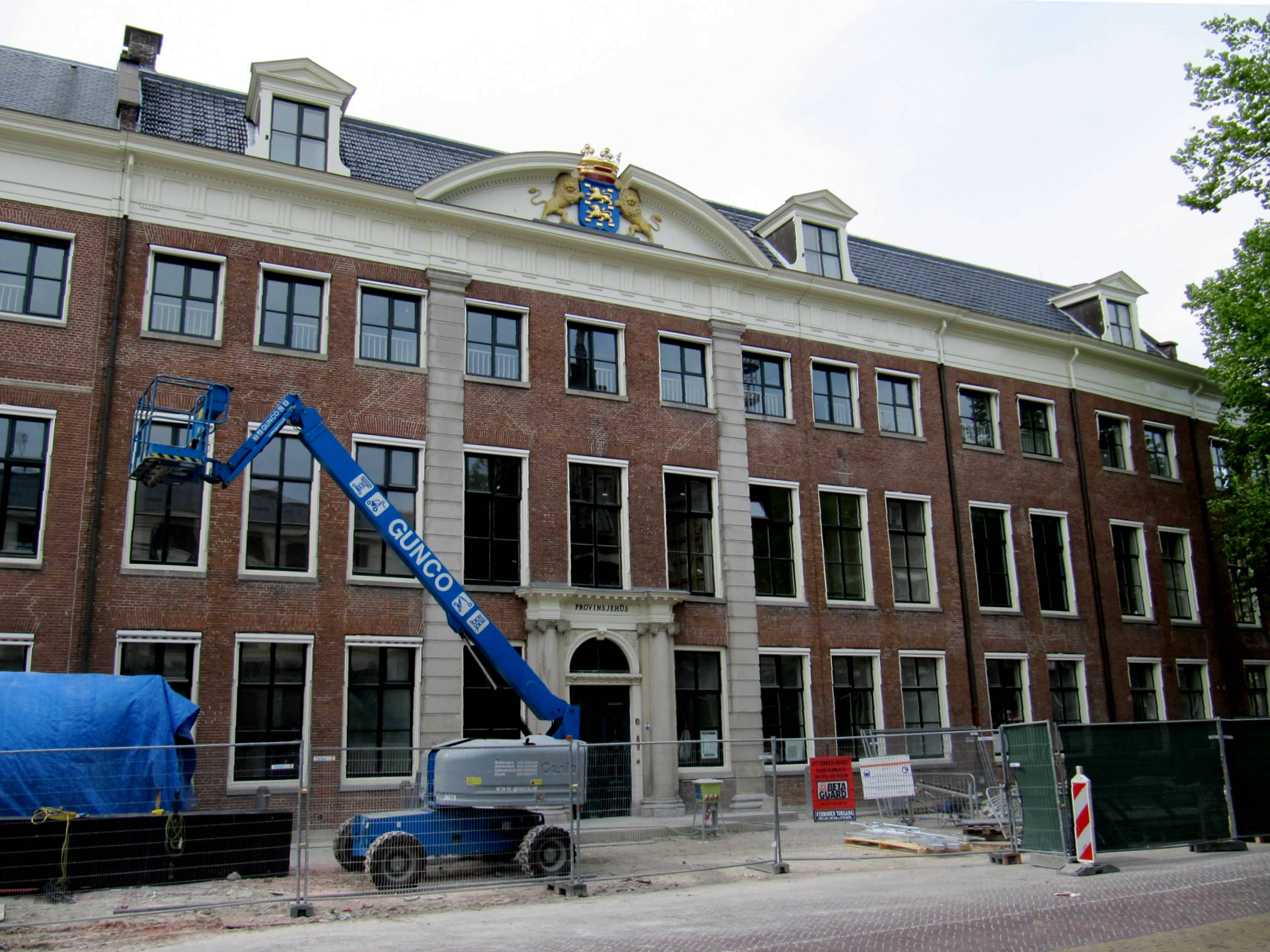
Seat of the provincial government in Leeuwarden

The King's Commissioner of Friesland is Arno Brok. The Provincial Council of Friesland has 43 seats. The Provincial Executive was a coalition of the Christian Democratic Appeal, the People's Party for Freedom and Democracy, the Labour Party and the Frisian National Party (FNP), until 2023 when new provincial elections saw a different composition in the provincial council.

2019 provincial elections
Party	Votes	Seats
Christian Democratic Appeal	49.704	8
Forum for Democracy	40.055	6
Labour Party	39.976	6
People's Party for Freedom and Democracy	28.073	4
Frisian National Party	23.662	4
GreenLeft	22.935	3
ChristianUnion	19.673	3
Party for Freedom	17.287	3
Socialist Party	15.426	2
Democrats 66	12.284	2
Party for the Animals	9.618	1
50PLUS	7.595	1
Total	298.241	43

== Transport ==
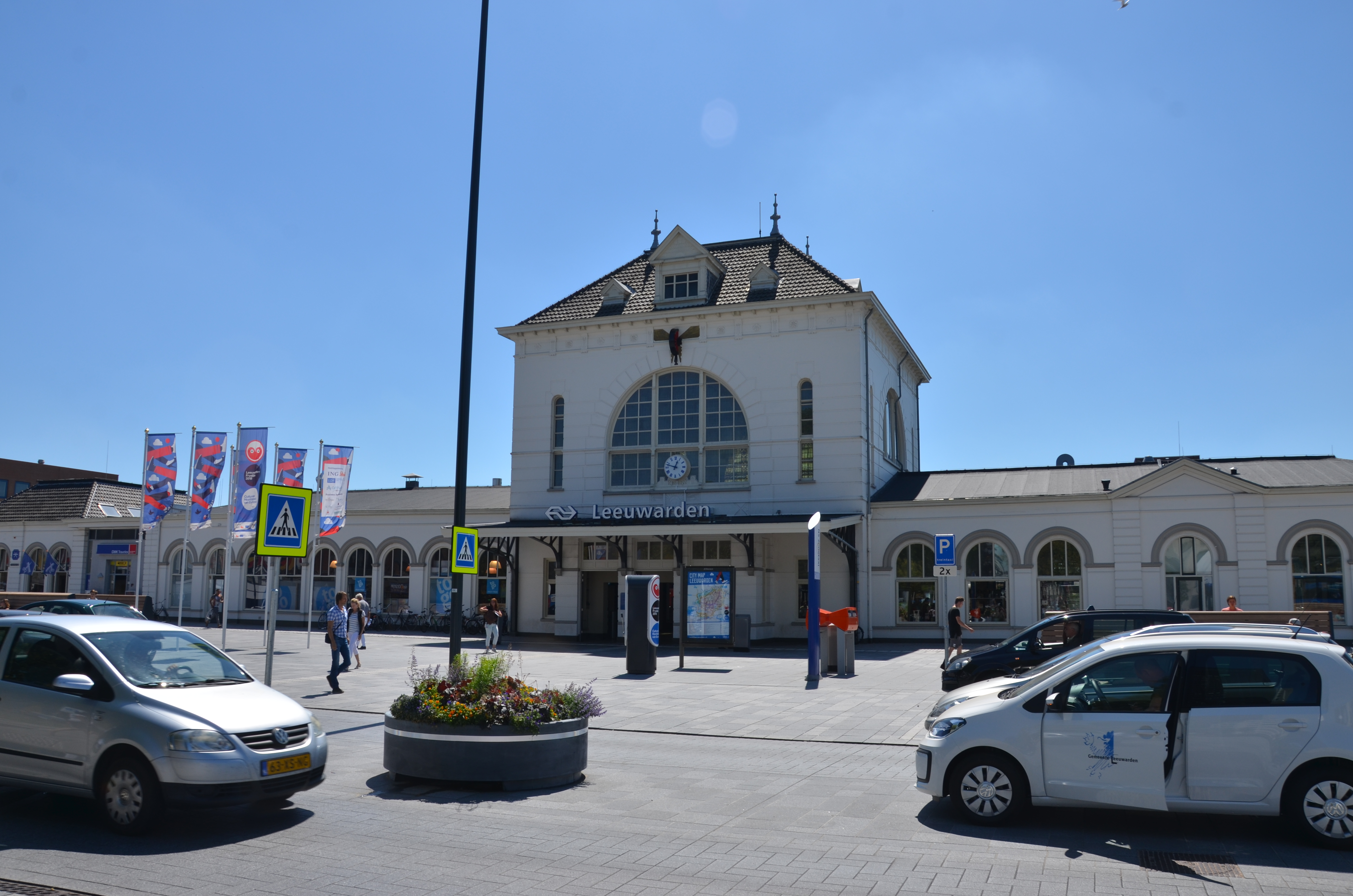
Leeuwarden railway station is a national heritage site

The four motorways in the province are A6, A7 (E22), A31, and A32.

The main railway station of Friesland is Leeuwarden, which connects the railways Arnhem–Leeuwarden, Harlingen–Nieuweschans, and Leeuwarden–Stavoren which are all (partially) located in the province.

Route	Railway stations in Friesland
Arnhem–Leeuwarden	Overijssel – Wolvega – Heerenveen IJsstadion – Heerenveen – Akkrum – Grou-Jirnsum – Leeuwarden
Harlingen–Nieuweschans	Harlingen Haven – Harlingen – Franeker – Dronryp – Deinum – Leeuwarden – Leeuwarden Camminghaburen – Hurdegaryp – Feanwâlden – De Westereen – Buitenpost – Groningen
Leeuwarden–Stavoren	Leeuwarden – Mantgum – Sneek Noord – Sneek – IJlst – Workum – Hindeloopen – Koudum-Molkwerum – Stavoren

Ameland Airport near Ballum and Drachten Airfield near Drachten are the two small general aviation airports in the province. The Royal Netherlands Air Force uses Vlieland Heliport and the Leeuwarden Air Base.

== See also ==
- Frisian Lakes – consists of 24 lakes in central and southwest Friesland

== Literature ==
- Helma Erkelens, Taal fen it hert. Language of the Heart. About Frisian Language and Culture, province of Fryslân, Leeuwarden 2004
- John Hines & Nelleke IJssennagger (eds.), Frisians and their North Sea Neighbours: From the Fifth Century to the Viking Age, Boydell & Brewer, Woodbridge/Rochester 2017
- Goffe Jensma, 'Minorities and Kinships. The Case of Ethnolinguistic Nationalism in Friesland’, in: P. Broomans et al. (eds.), The Beloved Mothertongue. Ethnolinguistic Nationalism in Small Nations: Inventories and Reflections, Peeters, Louvain-Paris-Dudley 2008, p. 63-78
- Horst Haider Munske (ed.), Handbuch des Friesischen / Handbook of Frisian Studies, Max Niemeyer, Tübingen 2001
- Oebele Vries, 'Frisonica libertas: Frisian Freedom as an Instance of Medieval Liberty', in: Journal of Medieval History 41 (2015), nr. 2, p. 229-248

== Media ==
Friesch Dagblad and Leeuwarder Courant are daily newspapers mainly written in Dutch. Omrop Fryslân is the public broadcaster with radio and TV programs mainly in Frisian.
