= Leeuwarden–Stavoren railway =

Railway line in the Netherlands

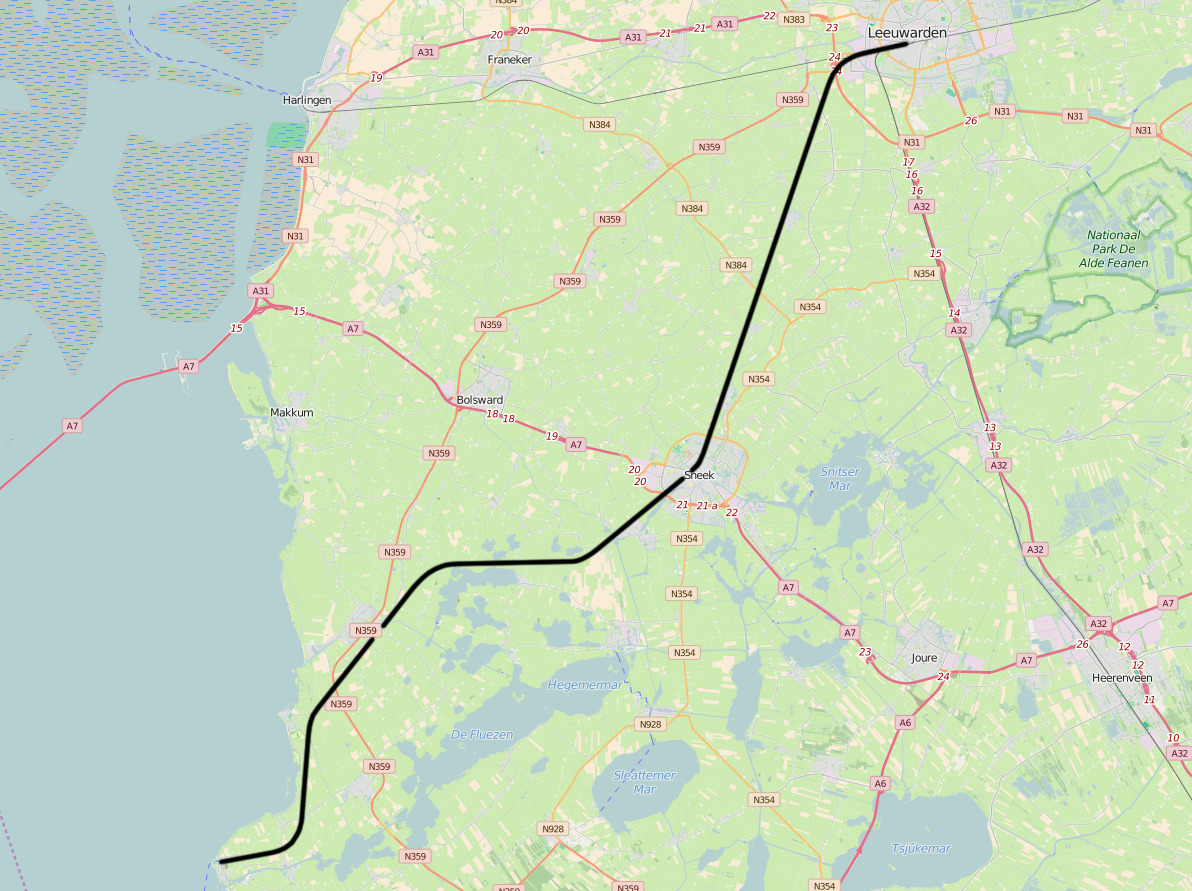

Overview
- Status: Operational
- Locale: Friesland, Netherlands
- Termini: Leeuwarden railway station; Stavoren railway station
- Stations: 9

Service
- Operator(s): Arriva

History
- Opened: 1863-1865

Technical
- Line length: 50 km (31 mi)
- Number of tracks: mostly single track
- Track gauge: 1,435 mm (4 ft 8 1/2 in) standard gauge
- Electrification: no

The Leeuwarden–Stavoren railway is a railway line in the Netherlands running from Leeuwarden to Stavoren, passing through Sneek, IJlst, Workum and Hindeloopen. The line is located in the province of Friesland. The line between Leeuwarden and Sneek was opened in 1883 and the line between Sneek and Hindeloopen was opened in 1885.

== Stations ==
The stations on the railway are:

- Leeuwarden: to Harlingen, Groningen and Stavoren
- Mantgum (1883–present)
- Sneek Noord (1883–present)
- Sneek (1883–present)
- IJlst (1885–present)
- Workum (1885–present)
- Hindeloopen (1885–present)
- Koudum-Molkwerum (1885–present)
- Stavoren (1885–present)

Stations closed in 1938: Jellum-Boksum, Bears, Jorwert, Boazum, Scharnegoutum, Oudega, Nijhuizum and Warns.

== Train service ==
Services are operated by Arriva. From Monday to Saturday trains between Leeuwarden and Sneek run 3x per hour. The Stadler WINK entered service in 2021.
