= IJlst railway station =

Railway station in the Netherlands

IJlst
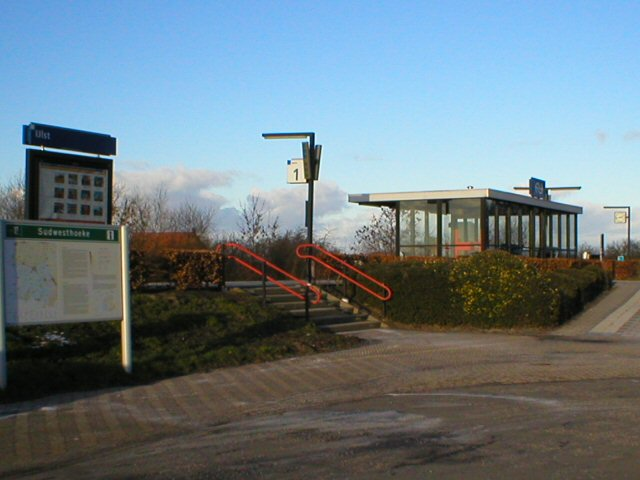

General information
- Location: Netherlands
- Coordinates: 53°0′53″N 5°36′59″E
- Line: Leeuwarden–Stavoren railway

History
- Opened: 28 November 1885 (original station), reopened 2 June 1985 (new station)

Services
Preceding station	Arriva Netherlands	Following station
Sneek towards Leeuwarden	Stoptrein 37100	Workum towards Stavoren
Location
- Location within Netherlands

IJlst is a railway station serving IJlst, Netherlands. It is located on the Leeuwarden–Stavoren railway between Sneek and Stavoren and the current station was opened on 2 June 1985. Owned by Nederlandse Spoorwegen, the train services are operated by Arriva.

The original railway station and its adjacent building was first opened on 28 November 1885 and regular service continued until 1938, when IJlst was removed from the train schedule. Train services briefly resumed from May 1940 until April 1941, with the station's building being demolished in 1954, although freight trains continued to stop in IJlst until September 1970. On 2 June 1985, the station was reopened with a small waiting room a few hundred meters to the north of the original location.

== Train services ==
The following services currently call at IJlst:

- 1x per hour local service (stoptrein) Leeuwarden - Sneek - Stavoren

== See also ==
- List of railway stations in Friesland
