= Drachten Airfield =

Drachten Airfield Vliegveld Drachten
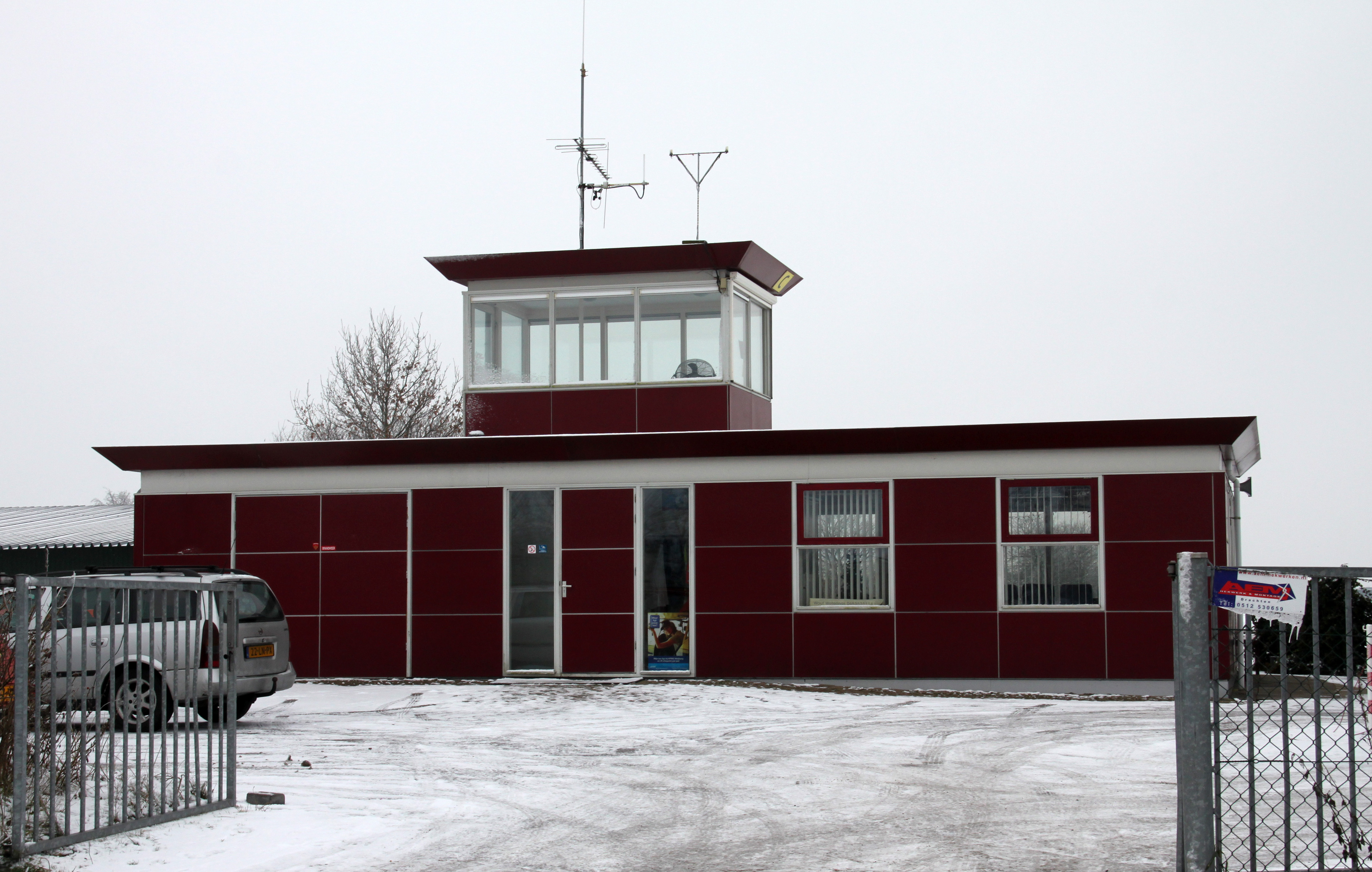
- IATA: none; ICAO: EHDR

Summary
- Airport type: Public
- Owner: Municipality of Smallingerland
- Operator: Stichting Vliegveld Drachten
- Location: Drachten
- Elevation AMSL: 14 ft / 4 m
- Coordinates: 53°07′05″N 006°07′45″E
- Interactive map of Drachten Airfield

Runways
Direction	Length		Surface
Direction	m	ft	Surface
07/25	950	3,117	Asphalt/Concrete
- Sources: AIP

Drachten Airfield (Dutch: Vliegveld Drachten) (ICAO: EHDR) is a small general aviation airfield in the Netherlands located in the province of Friesland, 1 NM (1.9 km; 1.2 mi) northeast of Drachten. It has one runway, 07/25, with an asphalt/concrete surface and a length of 950 m (3,117 ft). Customs services are available upon request to allow international flights.

The airfield was constructed in the 1950s by the Philips electronics company, which has a factory in Drachten. In an attempt to provide an avenue for otherwise illegal street races, the airfield is now also used for drag racing.
