= Hindeloopen railway station =

Railway station in the Netherlands

Hindeloopen
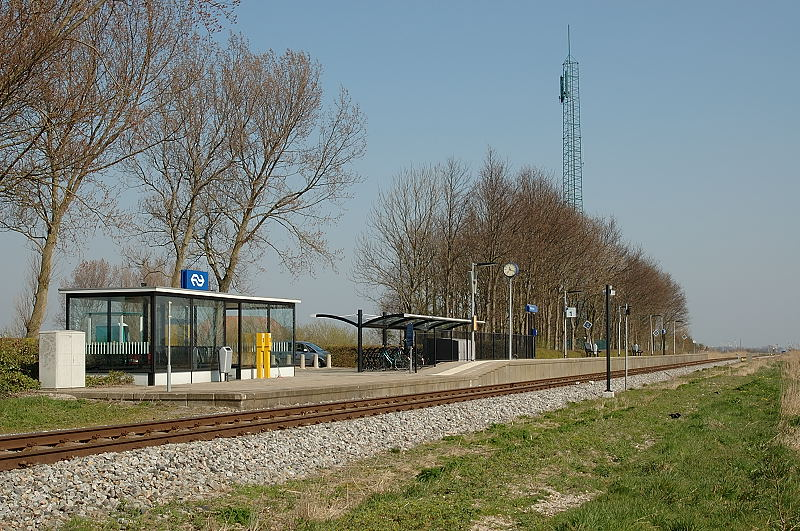

General information
- Location: Netherlands
- Coordinates: 52°56′46″N 5°25′23″E
- Line: Leeuwarden–Stavoren railway

Other information
- Station code: Hnp

History
- Opened: 28 November 1885

Services
Preceding station	Arriva Netherlands	Following station
Workum towards Leeuwarden	Stoptrein 37100	Koudum-Molkwerum towards Stavoren
Location
- Location within Netherlands

Hindeloopen is a railway station near Hindeloopen, Netherlands. The station opened on 28 November 1885 and is on the Leeuwarden–Stavoren railway between Sneek and Stavoren. The services are operated by Arriva.

== Train services ==
Route	Service type	Operator	Notes
Leeuwarden - Sneek - Stavoren	Local ("Stoptrein")	Arriva	1x per hour

== Bus services ==
Line	Route	Operator	Notes
102	Makkum - Idsegahuizum - Gaast - Ferwoude - Workum - Koudum - Hindeloopen	Arriva	Mon-Fri during daytime hours only.
941	Hindeloopen Dorp - Station	Arriva	This bus only operates if called 1,5 hours before its supposed departure ("belbus").

== To get to Hindeloopen ==
It is a 10-minute walk - West

== Gallery ==
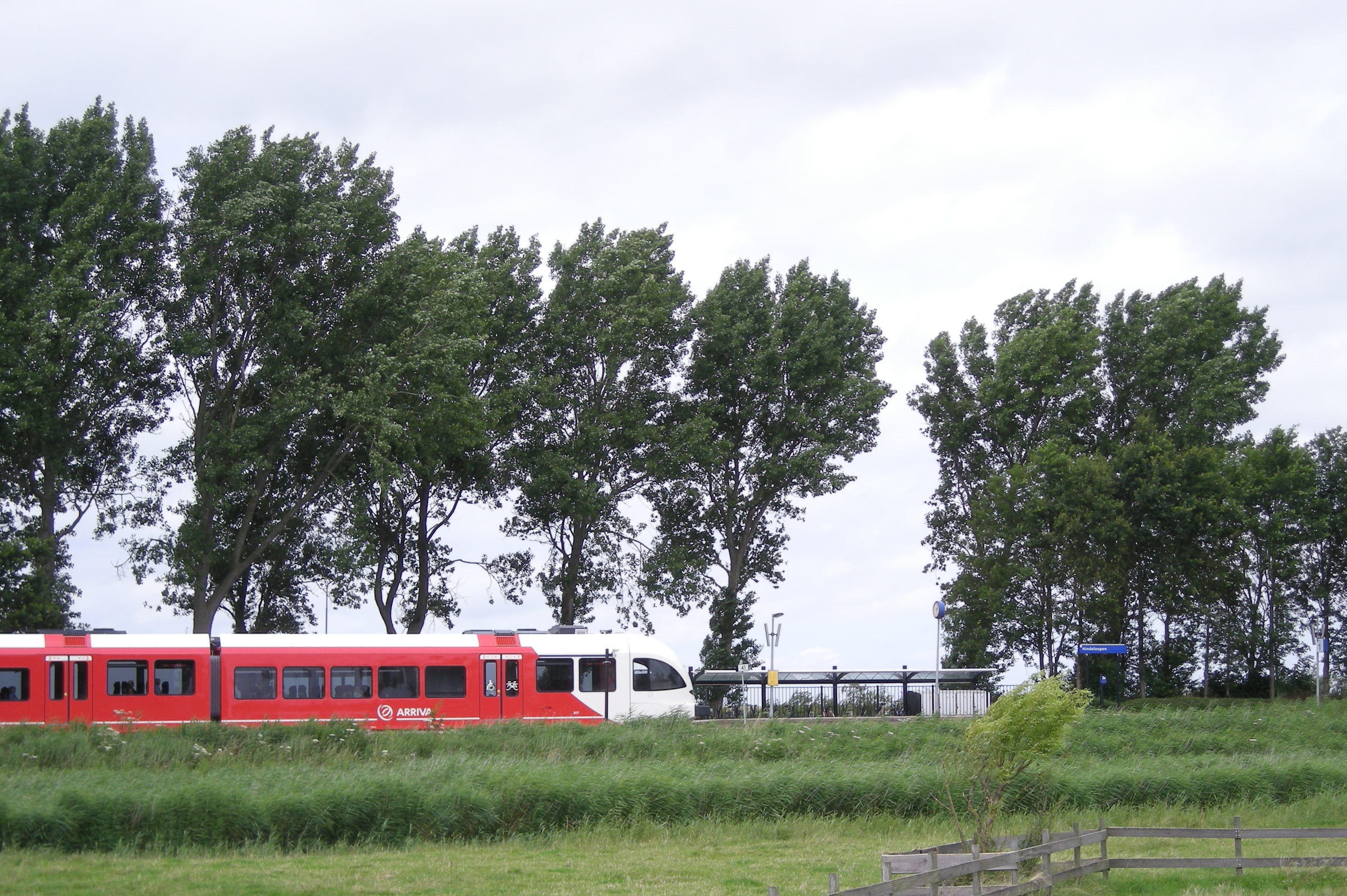
A Spurt at Hindeloopen

== See also ==
- List of railway stations in Friesland
