= Skûtsje =

Frisian sailing boat

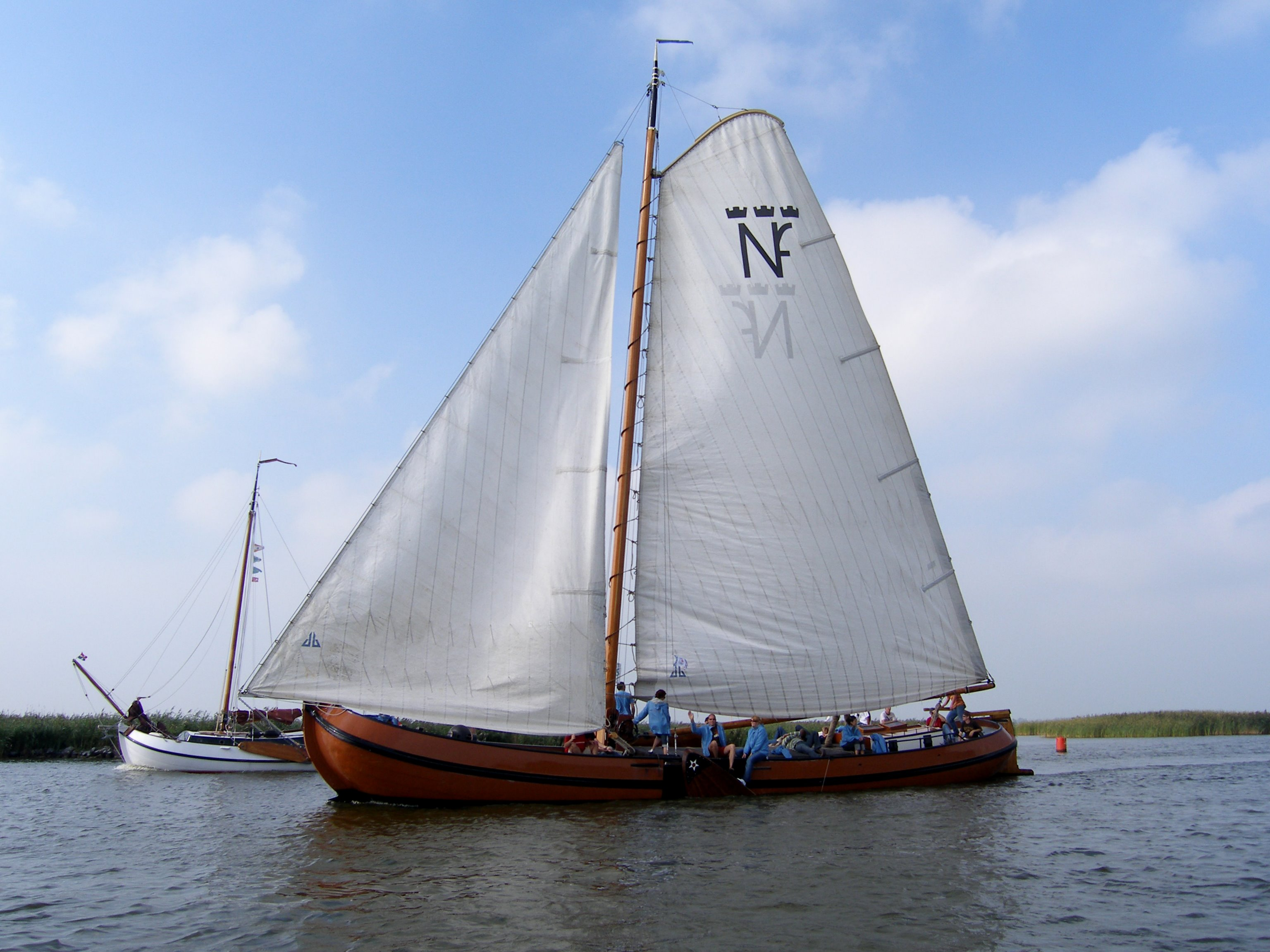
Skûtsje in Friesland

A skûtsje (pronounced 'skootshuh') is a Frisian sailing boat of the type tjalk or Dutch barge. It was originally an ordinary cargo boat, but today is a prized ship and one of the icons of Frisia. Skûtsjes were built from the 18th century until about 1930 and are 12 to 20 m (39 ft 4 1/2 in to 65 ft 7 3/8 in) long and on average 3.5 m (11 ft 5 3/4 in) wide, with a maximum of 4 m (13 ft 1 1/2 in) (based on the standard dimensions of Frisian bridges and locks).

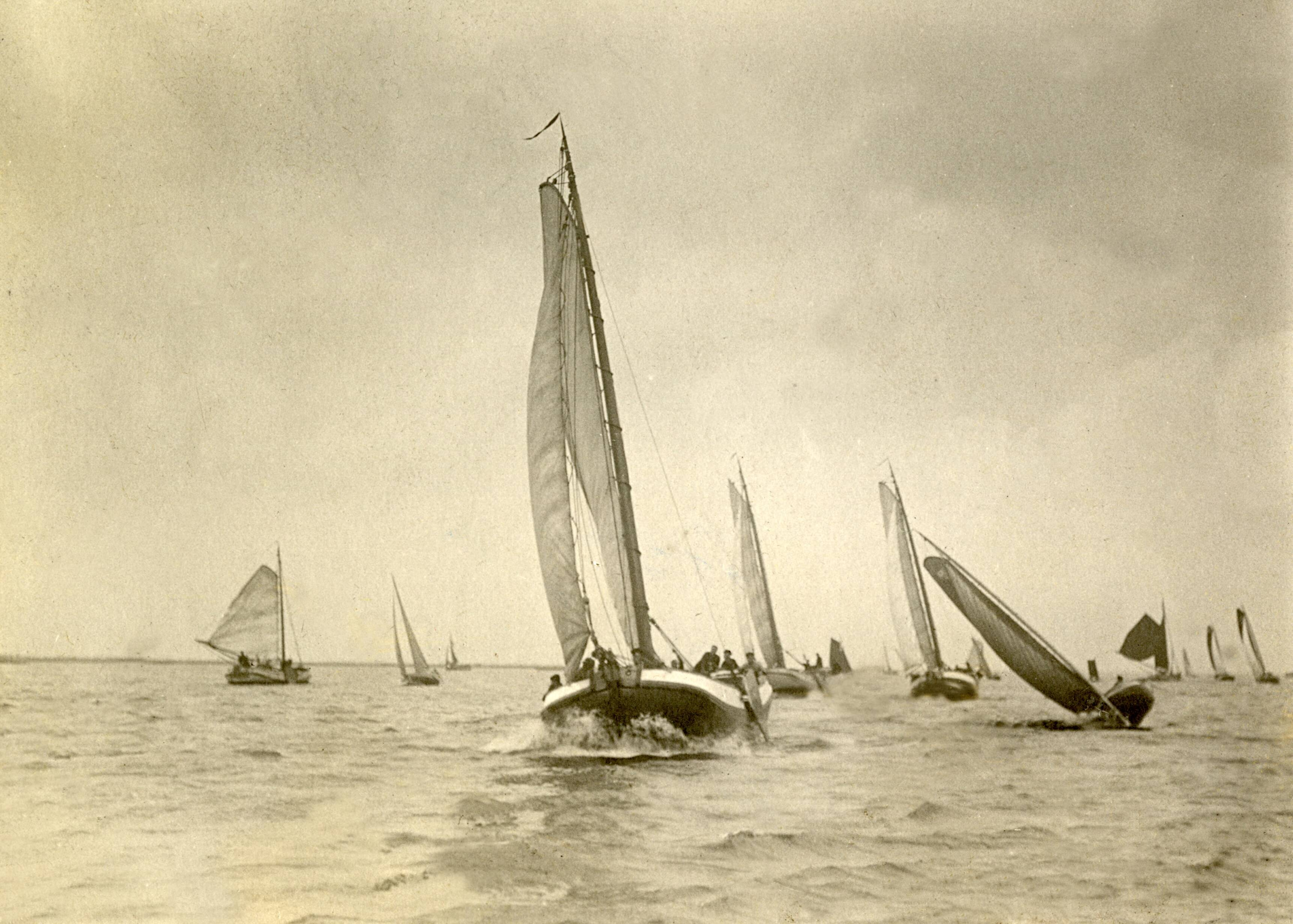
Skûtsje Twee Gebroeders sailing in 1909

In the 1920s and 1930s, many skûtsjes were fitted with engines, and after World War II the sails were often removed. Nevertheless, other, much larger, powered boats took over water transportation in the area and many skûtsjes were rebuilt into houseboats or luxurious sailing yachts. Over time, more and more were restored to their original state.

There is a yearly racing event in Friesland called Skûtsjesilen. Such races were already held in the early 19th century, but since 1945 they have been regulated through a committee, SKS. In these races, each Skûtsje represents a city or village. In 1981 another organisation, IFKS, also started organising races.

This racing already started early in the 20th century when villages in Friesland or more precisely often the bar and hotel owners made prizes available for the winner. At that time the skipper and his family lived on board in a narrow cabin and before the race, the family and the interior of the cabin were placed ashore to make the boat as light as possible at the start of the race.

The Skûtsjemuseum in Eernewoude (Frisian: Earnewâld) started building a new skûtsje named the Æbelina, out of wood in the old traditional way, it was launched in August 2009.
