= Workum railway station =

Railway station in the Netherlands

Workum
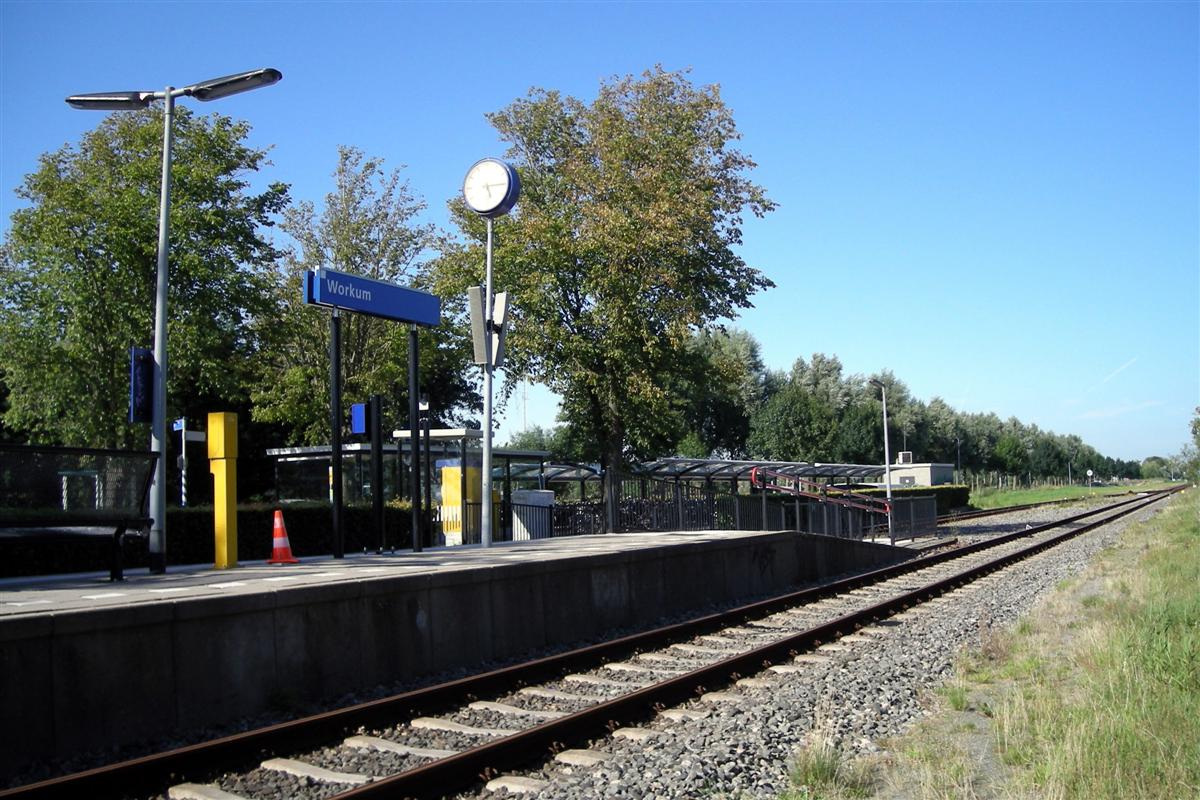

General information
- Location: Netherlands
- Coordinates: 52°58′17″N 5°27′21″E
- Line: Leeuwarden–Stavoren railway

History
- Opened: 28 November 1885

Services
Preceding station	Arriva Netherlands	Following station
IJlst towards Leeuwarden	Stoptrein 37100	Hindeloopen towards Stavoren
Location
- Location within Netherlands

Workum is a railway station serving Workum, Netherlands. The station was opened on 28 November 1885. It is located on the Leeuwarden–Stavoren railway between Sneek and Stavoren. The train services are operated by Arriva.

== Train services ==
Route	Service type	Operator	Notes
Leeuwarden - Sneek - Stavoren	Local ("Stoptrein")	Arriva	1x per hour

== Bus services ==
Line	Route	Operator	Notes
102	Makkum - Idsegahuizum - Gaast - Ferwoude - Workum - Koudum - Hindeloopen	Arriva	Mon-Fri during daytime hours only.
935	Nijhuizum - Workum	Arriva	This bus only operates if called 1,5 hours before its supposed departure ("belbus").
936	Ferwoude - Workum	Arriva	This bus only operates if called 1,5 hours before its supposed departure ("belbus"). 1 run during both rush hours, 1x per hour during off-peak hours, evenings and weekends.
937	Gaast - Workum	Arriva	This bus only operates if called 1,5 hours before its supposed departure ("belbus"). 1 run during both rush hours, 1x per hour during off-peak hours, evenings and weekends.
938	It Heidenskip - Workum	Arriva	This bus only operates if called 1,5 hours before its supposed departure ("belbus").

== See also ==
- List of railway stations in Friesland
