= Skûtsjesilen =

Regatta in the Netherlands

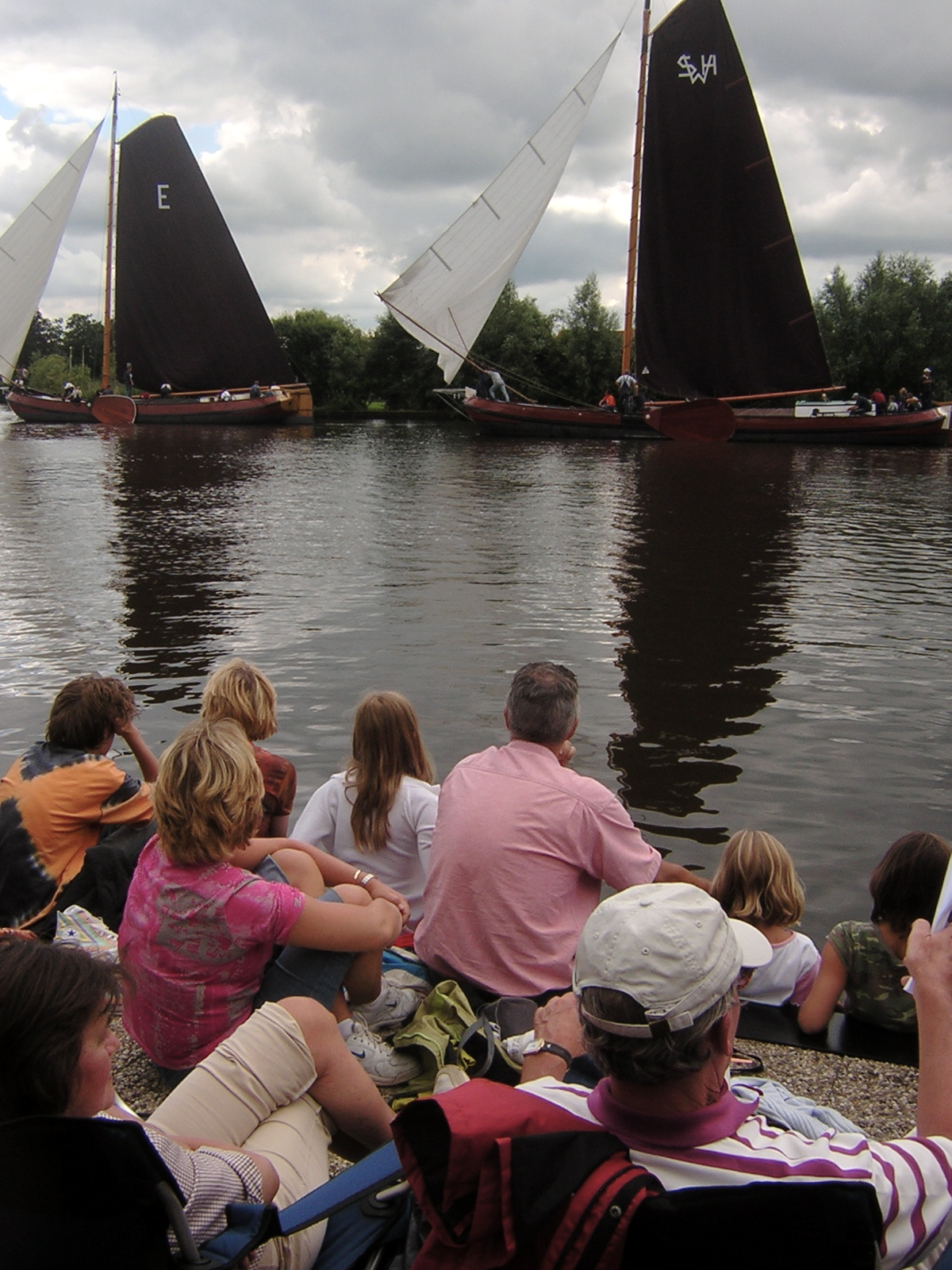
SKS skûtsjesilen in Eernewoude.

Skûtsjesilen is a Frisian regatta with skûtsjes, in particular, the races organised by the Sintrale Kommisje Skûtsjesilen (SKS) and the Iepen Fryske Kampioenskippen Skûtsjesilen (IFKS).

== History ==
In the early nineteenth century, competitions were organized with skûtsjes for example in 1820 in Sneek. Regattas were held when farmers had no cargo. Sailors could sometimes earn a cash prize when innkeepers organized a competition during a fair. The prize ceremony would be held in the inn. In the second half of the nineteenth century, clubs were founded to organize skûtsje regattas. During this period, the amateur sport developed. Professional competitions became rarer: Professional skippers could not spare the time, and the number of participants began to decline.

In the twentieth century, cargo ships became increasingly motorized and the number of skûtsjes began to decline. During the Second World War, there was a reduction in skûtsje use because of fuel shortages. Boats became available to amateurs. The Sintrale Kommisje Skûtsjesilen (SKS) was founded in 1945.

While the number of race committees grew after the war, the number of skûtsjes fell; In the fifties, it was difficult for skippers to keep up the payments to own a skûtsje. Foundations were set up to buy a skûtsje to support participation. Thus, the current SKS championship arose with skûtsjes that come from a town or village. The only exception is the boat d 'Halve Maen, which was originally owned by Philips.

Lodewijk Meeter was important for the continued existence of the sport during this period. In 1953, when the regatta would have been canceled due to low participation, Meeter arranged enough boats so the competition could continue. He was also the first skipper whose skûtsje was specially bought for competitions.

In the seventies and eighties, it became possible for individuals to possess their own skûtsje. Because these skûtsjes did not fit into the rules of the SKS (skippers did not come from a family of skippers), these skippers set up an alternate organization. In 1981, the "Iepen Fryske Kampioenskippen Skûtsjesilen" (IFKS), (Open Frisian Championships Skûtsjesilen) was formed. There are currently two Skûtsjesilen championships in Friesland.

The SKS regatta has long been attended by a fixed number of 14 skûtsjes. Although there are skipper or crew changes, often the ships are the same. The IFKS regatta has grown also over the years: There are currently about sixty skûtsjes in four classes.

On 22, 23 and May 24, 2014, competitions took place on the Kralingen in Rotterdam under the name Skûtsjesilen Holland. On July 20, 2014 the SKS competition will start.

| Skutsje | Place | Skipper | Sign |
|---|---|---|---|
| Eildert Sietez | Akkrum | Pieter Eldertszn. Meeter | Sailsign from the Skutsje Akkrum |
| Twee Gebroeders - Drachten | Drachten | Jeroen Pietersma | Sailsign from the Skûtsje Drachten |
| d'Halve Maen - Drachten | Drachten | Berend Mink | Sailsign from the Skûtsje Drachten D'Halve Maen |
| Twee Gebroeders - Earnewâld | Earnewâld | Gerhard Pietersma | Sailsign from the Skûtsje Earnewald |
| Doarp Grou | Grouw | Douwe Azn Visser | Sailsign from the Skûtsje Grouw |
| Gerben van Manen - Heerenveen | Heerenveen | Alco Reijenga | Sailsign from the Skûtsje Heerenveen |
| It Doarp Huzum | Huizum | Lodewijk Hzn Meeter | Sailsign from the Skûtsje Huizum |
| Oeral Thús - Joure | Joure | Dirk Jan Reijenga | Sailsign from the Skûtsje Joure |
| Ut’e Striid - Langweer | Langweer | Johannes Meeter | Sailsign from the Skûtsje Langweer |
| Rienk Ulbesz Leeuwarden | Leeuwarden | Siete Ezn. Meeter | Sailsign from the Skûtsje Leeuwarden |
| Lemster Skûtsje | Lemmer | Albert Visser | Sailsign from the Skûtsje Lemmer |
| De Sneker Pan | Sneek | Douwe Visser Jzn. | Sailsign from the Skûtsje Sneek |
| Súdwesthoek - Stavoren | Stavoren | Auke de Groot | Sailsign from the Skûtsje Stavoren |
| Klaas van der Meulen - Woudsend | Woudsend | Teake Klaas van der Meulen | Sailsign from the Skûtsje Woudsend |
