= Koudum-Molkwerum railway station =

Railway station in the Netherlands

Koudum-Molkwerum
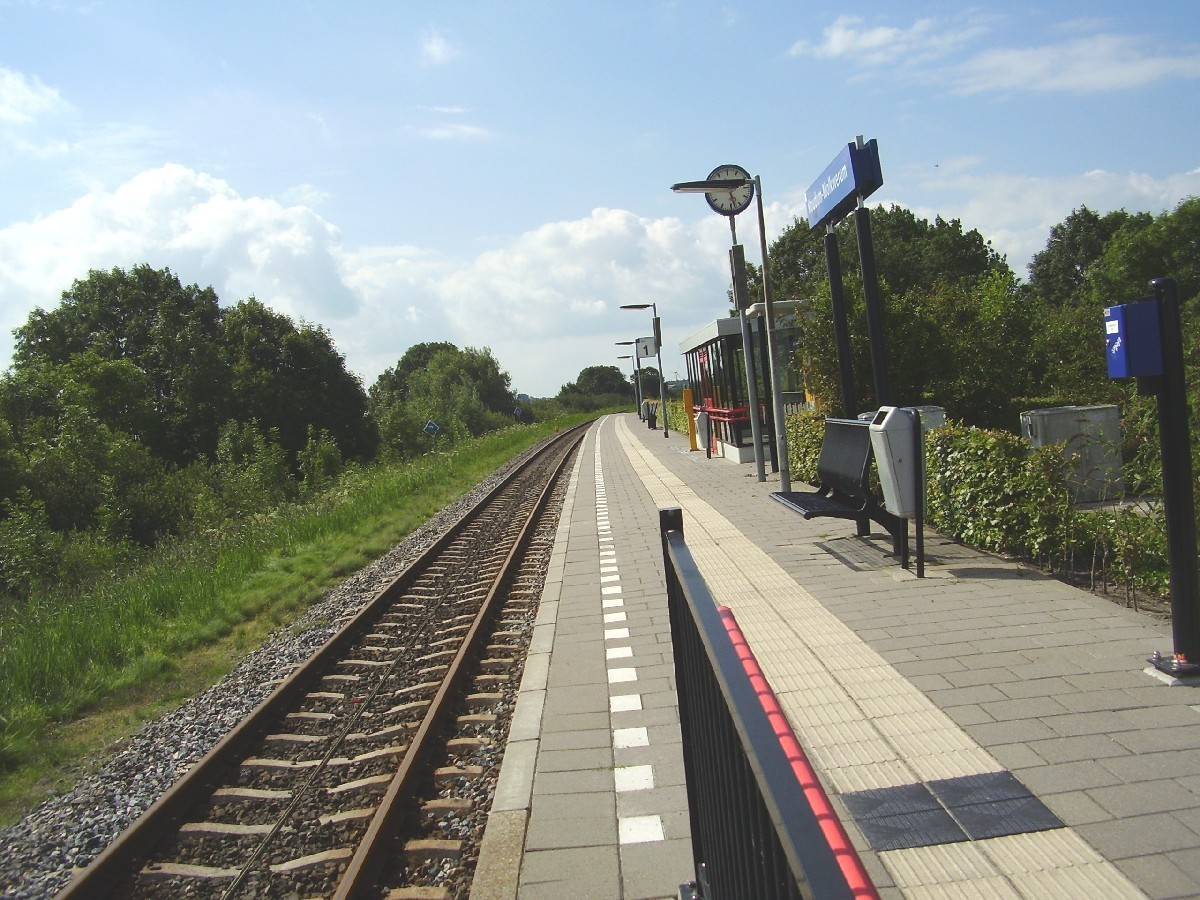

General information
- Location: Netherlands
- Coordinates: 52°54′08″N 5°24′38″E
- Line: Leeuwarden–Stavoren railway

History
- Opened: 28 November 1885

Services
Preceding station	Arriva Netherlands	Following station
Hindeloopen towards Leeuwarden	Stoptrein 37100	Stavoren Terminus
Location
- Location within Netherlands

Koudum-Molkwerum is a railway station located near Molkwerum and Koudum, Netherlands. The station was opened on 28 November 1885 and is on the Leeuwarden - Stavoren railway line. The train service is operated by Arriva. The station was closed between 15 May 1938 and 1 June 1940. The platform at this station is only 90 meters long and therefore the shortest of all train platforms in the country.

== Train services ==
Route	Service type	Operator	Notes
Leeuwarden - Sneek - Stavoren	Local ("Stoptrein")	Arriva	1x per hour

== Bus services ==
Line	Route	Operator	Notes
939	Molkwerum Dorp - Station	Arriva	This bus only operates if called 1,5 hours before its supposed departure ("belbus").
940	Warns - Molkwerum	Arriva	This bus only operates if called 1,5 hours before its supposed departure ("belbus"). Only 1 run during morning rush hour (2 during school breaks), no runs during afternoon rush hour. 1 run on Saturday morning. 1x per hour after 20:10 (weekdays) and on Sundays.

== See also ==
- List of railway stations in Friesland
