= Stavoren railway station =

Railway station in Friesland, Netherlands

Stavoren
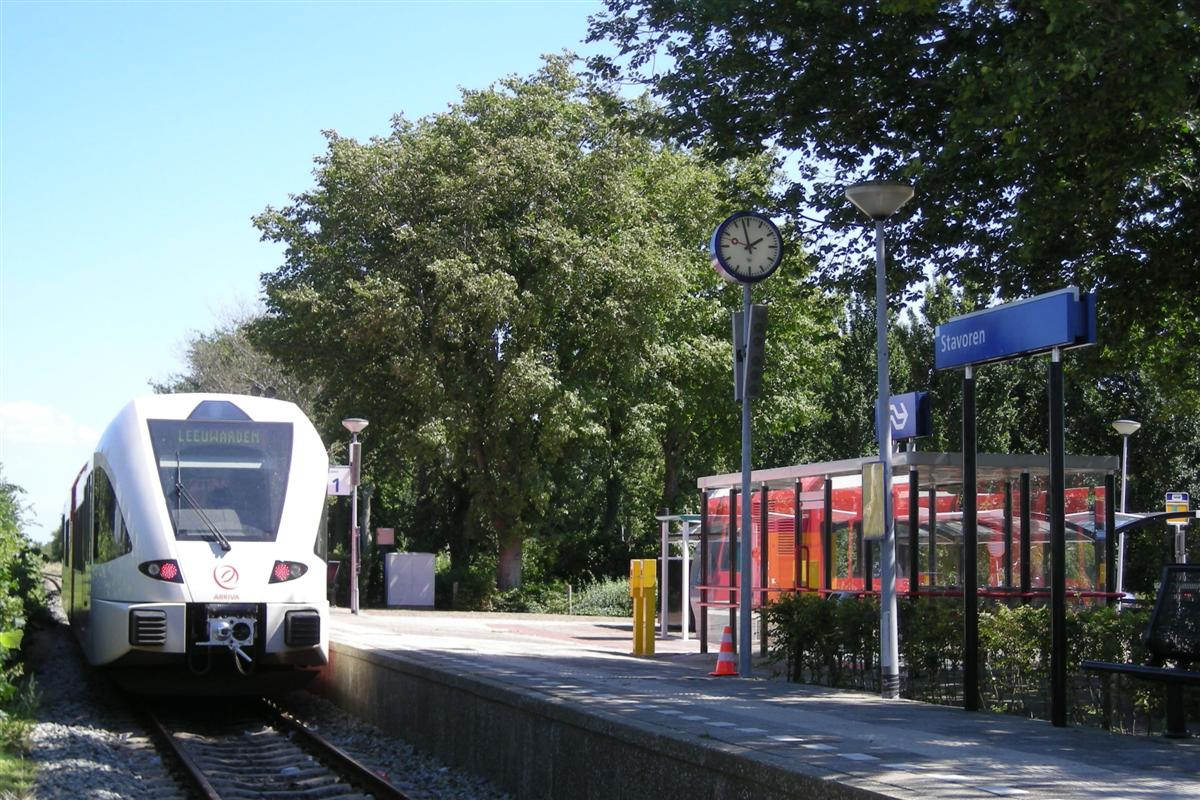

General information
- Location: Netherlands
- Coordinates: 52°53′12″N 5°21′35″E
- Line: Leeuwarden–Stavoren railway

History
- Opened: 28 November 1885

Services
Preceding station	Arriva Netherlands	Following station
Koudum-Molkwerum towards Leeuwarden	Stoptrein 37100	Terminus
Location
- Location within Netherlands

Stavoren is a terminus railway station in Stavoren, Netherlands. The station opened on 28 November 1885 and is the southern terminus of the Leeuwarden–Stavoren railway. Train services are operated by Arriva.

Between 1943 and 1979, the station was called Staveren.

== Major destinations ==
For most places in the Netherlands, travel to Leeuwarden. From Stavoren, there is a ferry to Enkhuizen.

== Train services ==
Route	Service type	Operator	Notes
Leeuwarden - Sneek - Stavoren	Local ("Stoptrein")	Arriva	1x per hour

== Bus services ==
Line	Route	Operator	Notes
103	Hemelum - Bakhuizen - Mirns - Warns - Stavoren	Arriva	Mon-Sat during daytime hours only.

== Boat services ==
Route	Operator	Notes
Enkhuizen - Stavoren	Rederij V&O	2-3x per day during the April–October season only.

== Accident ==
On 25 July 2010 a maintenance train collided with a buffer stop at the station. The train rammed a small shop, passed through it and stopped at the square behind it. Only two people were injured, out of four people on the train. The accident happened late at night, when passenger services had already finished. Aerial photographs of the accident show several wagons dispersed across the platform, indicating the collision took place at high speed.

The Dutch Safety Board investigated the accident and concluded on 13 September 2011 that the direct cause of the accident was a combination of two factors: the train driver had not seen a signal and the ATB train protection system did not succeed in stopping the train either. The driver missed the signal because he was unfamiliar with the route, because the work plan contained errors, because some signs along the route were missing, because the signal was unusual, and because he was distracted. The ATB was unsuccessful because the systems on the train and along the track were incompatible, and because the ATB had been automatically switched to a less restrictive mode. The underlying cause was identified by the Board as a lack of attention to safety among the companies involved.

== See also ==
- List of railway stations in Friesland

== Gallery ==
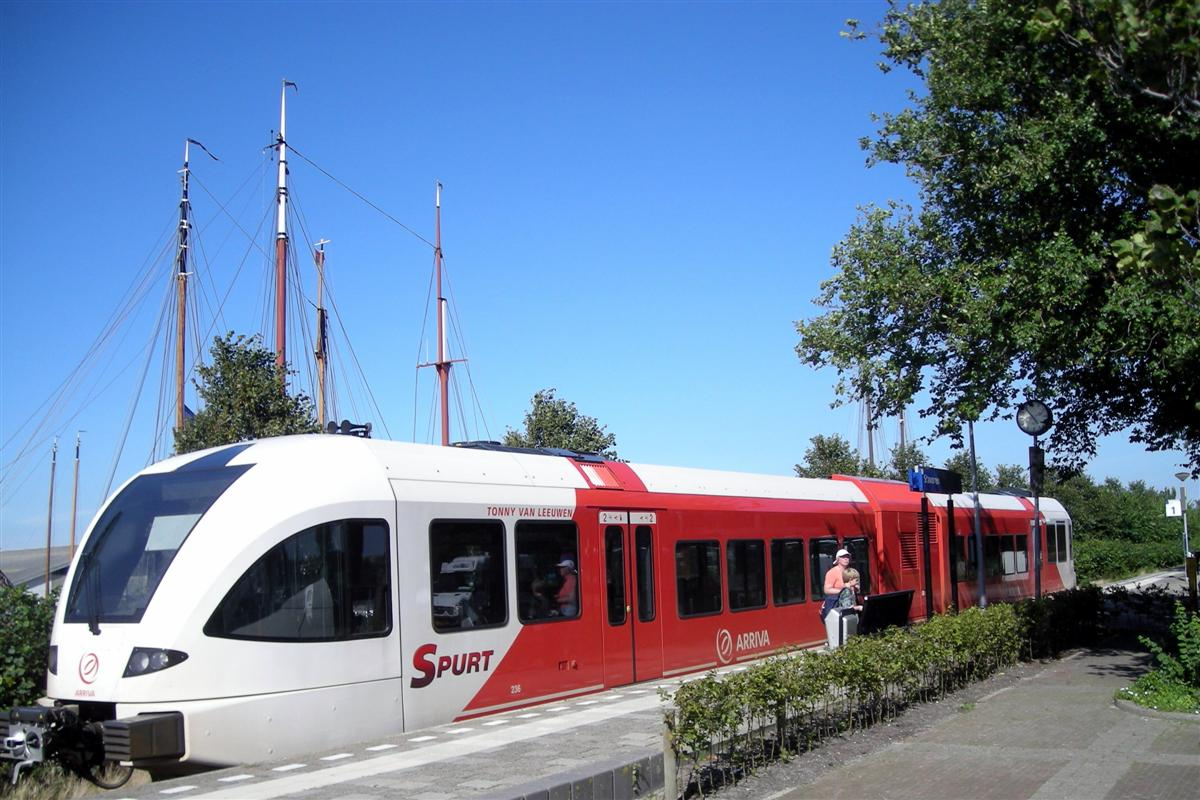
A Spurt at Stavoren
