= Protos (train) =

Electric multiple unit

Connexxion Class 5030
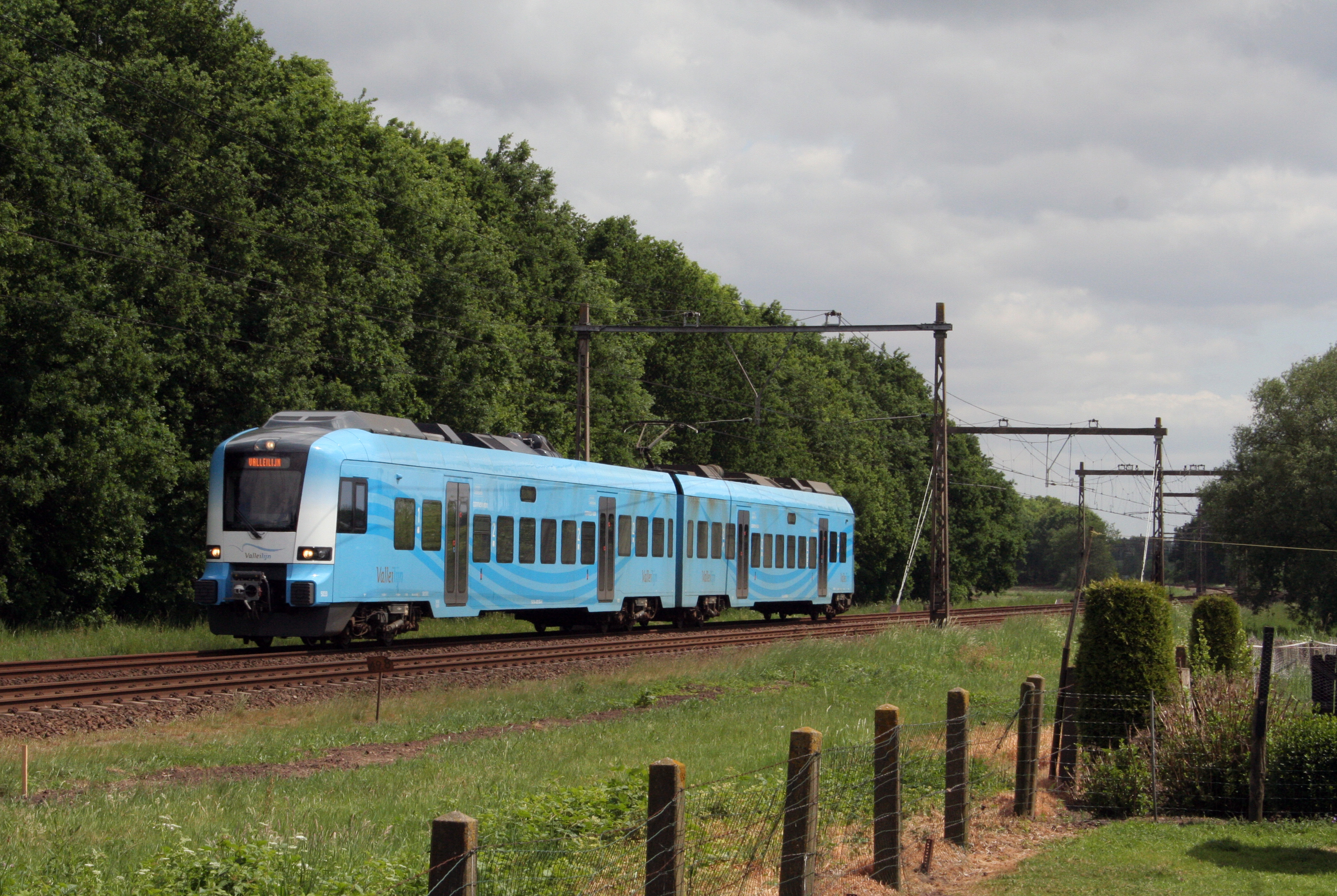
- PROTOS train at Hoevelaken
- In service: 2007–present
- Manufacturer: Fahrzeugtechnik Dessau
- Constructed: 2006-2007
- Entered service: 23 September 2007
- Refurbished: 2025-2027
- Number built: 6
- Number in service: 5
- Formation: 2 cars per unit
- Fleet numbers: 5031-5036
- Capacity: 12 x 1st Class; 154 x 2nd Class
- Operator: Keolis Nederland
- Depots: Amersfoort and Roosendaal
- Line served: Valleilijn

Specifications
- Floor height: 810 mm (31.89 in)
- Doors: 8
- Maximum speed: 160 km/h (99 mph)
- Weight: 108 t (106 long tons; 119 short tons)
- Traction system: Kiepe DPU 702 IGBT-VVVF
- Electric system: 1.5 kV Catenary
- Current collection: Pantograph
- Track gauge: 1,435 mm (4 ft 8 1/2 in) standard gauge

The Protos is an electric multiple unit built by the German company Fahrzeugtechnik Dessau.

== Details ==
The train is built with two coaches. The train has a low floor, at a height of 810 mm, so there is little to no step between the platform height and the trains. The prototype unit left the factory in September 2006 and was displayed at InnoTrans 2006. The only operator of these units is Connexxion on the Valleilijn between Amersfoort and Ede-Wageningen in the Netherlands where 5 sets were delivered. After testing, the units entered passenger service in September 2007.

== UIC and coach numbers ==
Set number 2	mB-coach 1	mAB-coach 1	Entered service	Name	Status
5031	94 84 4811 003-1	94 84 4812 002-2	26 July 2007	Henk Lambooij	In use
5032	94 84 4811 004-9	94 84 4812 003-0	26 August 2007		In use
5033	94 84 4811 005-6	94 84 4812 004-8	27 September 2007	Hans van Daalen	In use
5034	94 84 4811 002-3	94 84 4812 005-5	3 November 2007		In use
5035	94 84 4811 006-4	94 84 4812 006-3	25 November 2007	Marijke van Haaren	In use
5036 / FTD01			September 2011		Dismantled

== Services operating ==
Series	Train type	Route
31300 RS 34	Stoptrein	Amersfoort - Barneveld Noord - Barneveld Centrum - Barneveld Zuid - Lunteren - Ede Centrum - Ede-Wageningen
31400 RS 34	Stoptrein	Amersfoort - Barneveld Noord - Barneveld Centrum - Barneveld Zuid

== Gallery ==
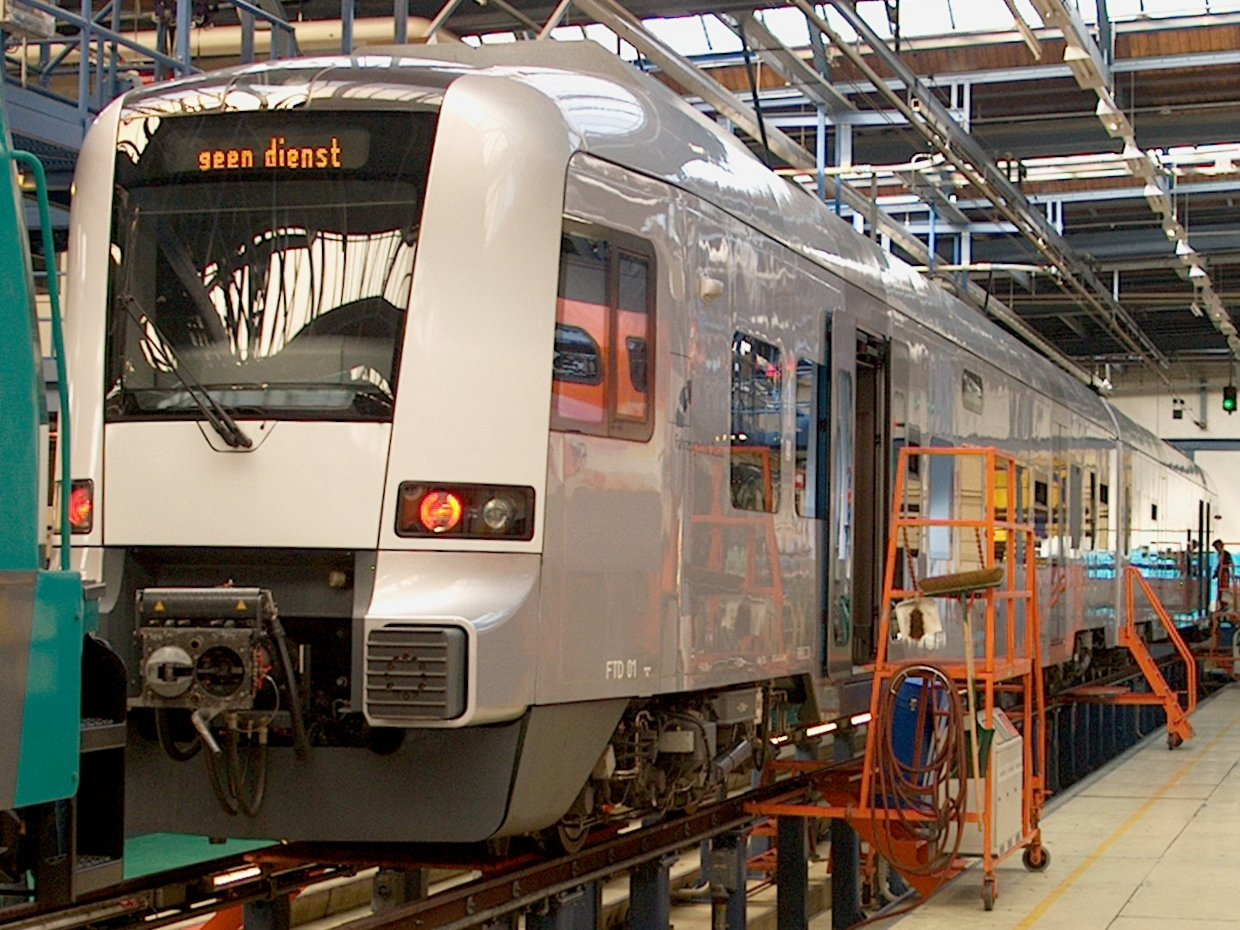
Prototype at Amsterdam Zaanstraat depot

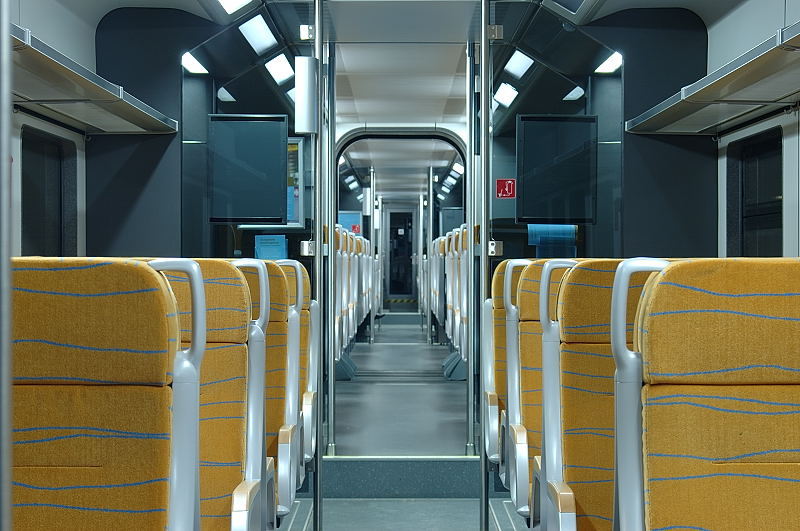
Interior of the mB-coach

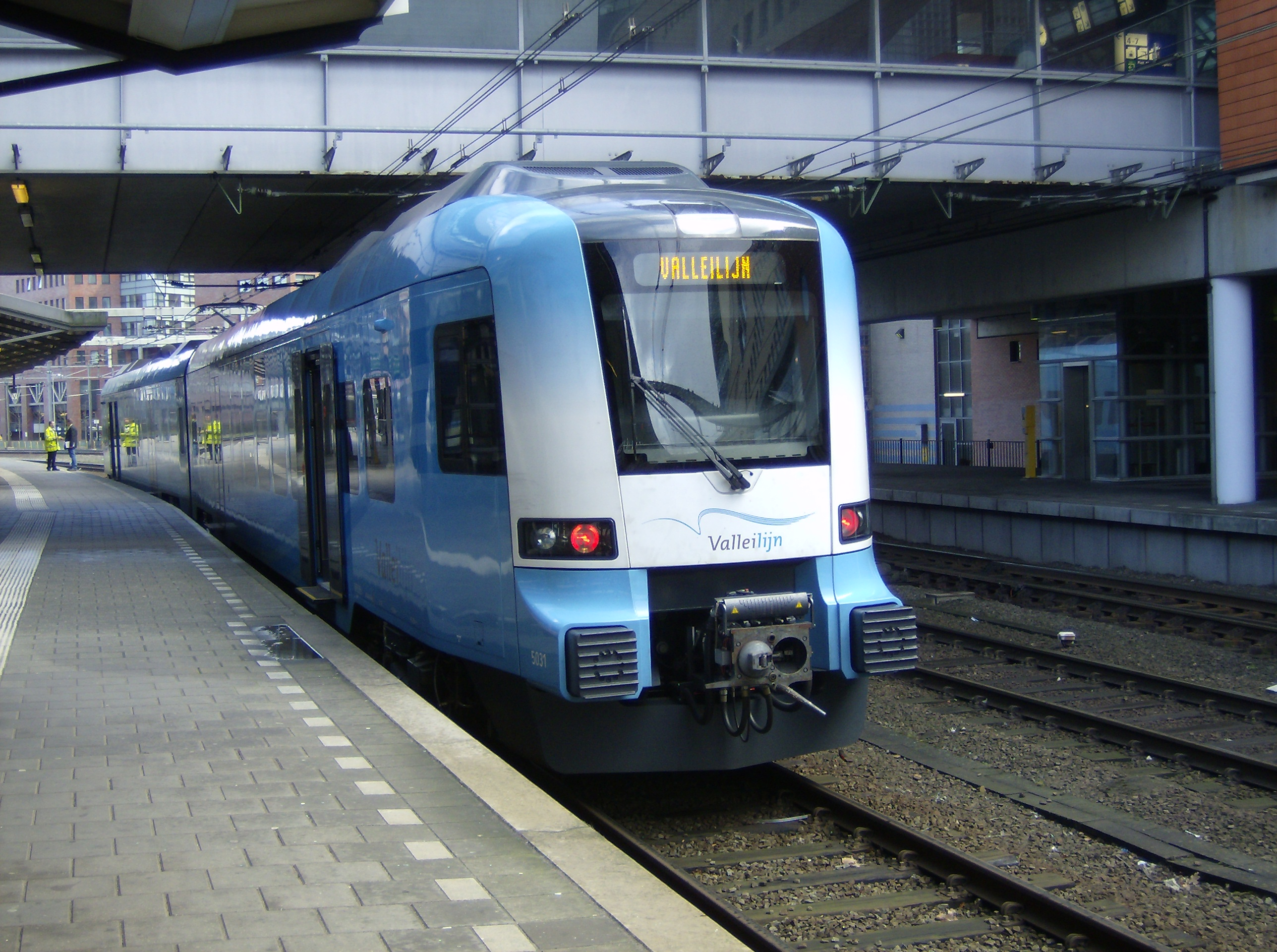
5031 at Amersfoort
