= Lunteren railway station =

Railway station in the Netherlands

Lunteren
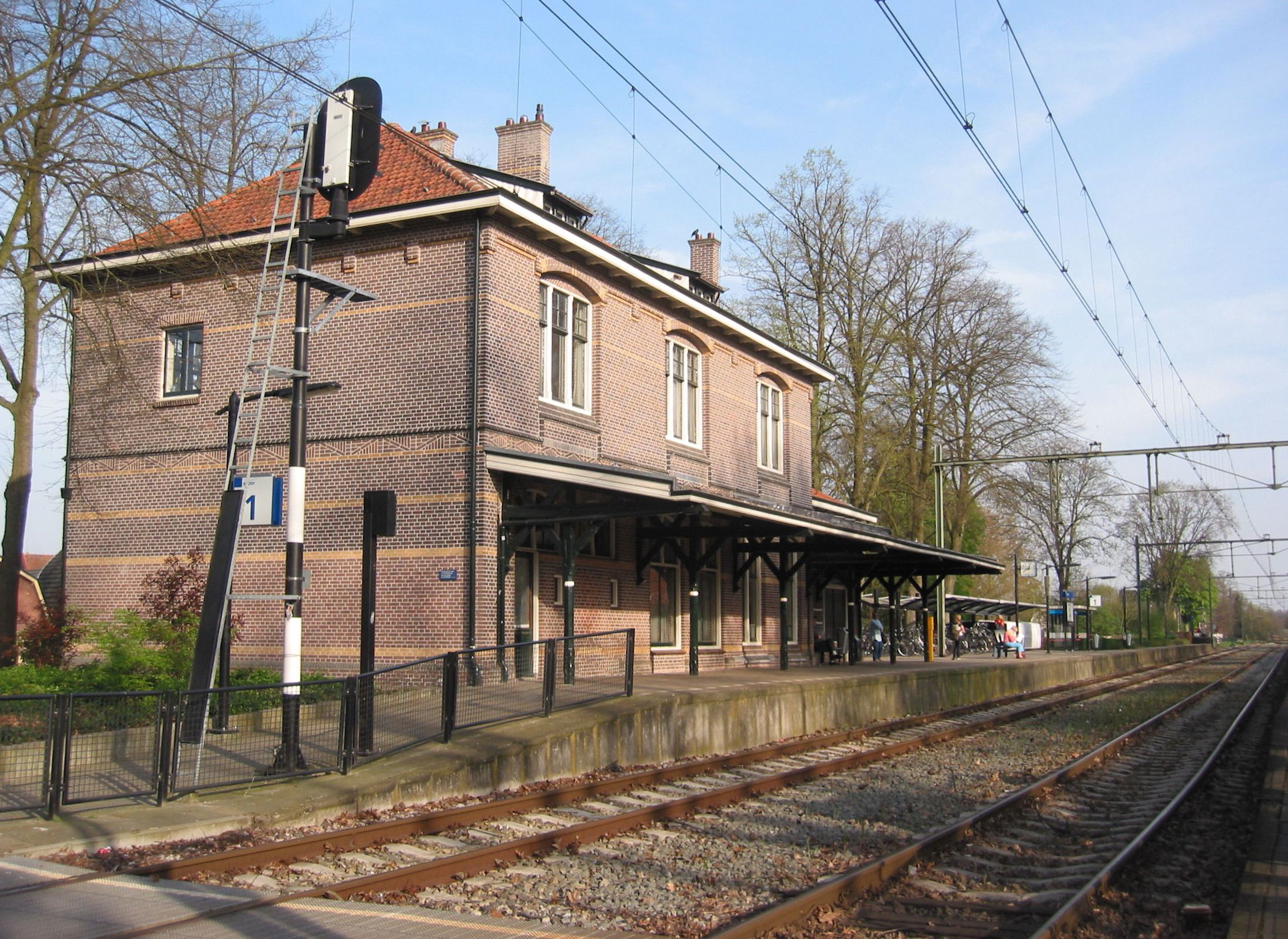
- Lunteren station in 2007

General information
- Location: Netherlands
- Coordinates: 52°05′06″N 5°37′27″E
- Lines: Amsterdam–Arnhem railway Nijkerk–Ede-Wageningen railway

History
- Opened: 1902

Services
Preceding station	Valleilijn	Following station
Barneveld Zuid towards Amersfoort	Stoptrein 31300	Ede Centrum towards Ede-Wageningen
Location
- Location within Netherlands

Lunteren is a railway station located in Lunteren, Netherlands.

== History ==
The station was opened on 1 May 1902 and is located on the Valleilijn. The station closed on 7 September 1944 and re-opened 20 May 1951. The station and services are currently operated by Connexxion, previously operated by Nederlandse Spoorwegen.

The train services pass here as the line is single track.

== Train services ==
As of 11 December 2016, the following local train services call at this station:

- Stoptrein: Amersfoort - Barneveld - Ede-Wageningen

== Bus services ==
Bus line 505 stops at the station.
