= Barneveld Noord railway station =

Railway station in the Netherlands

Barneveld Noord
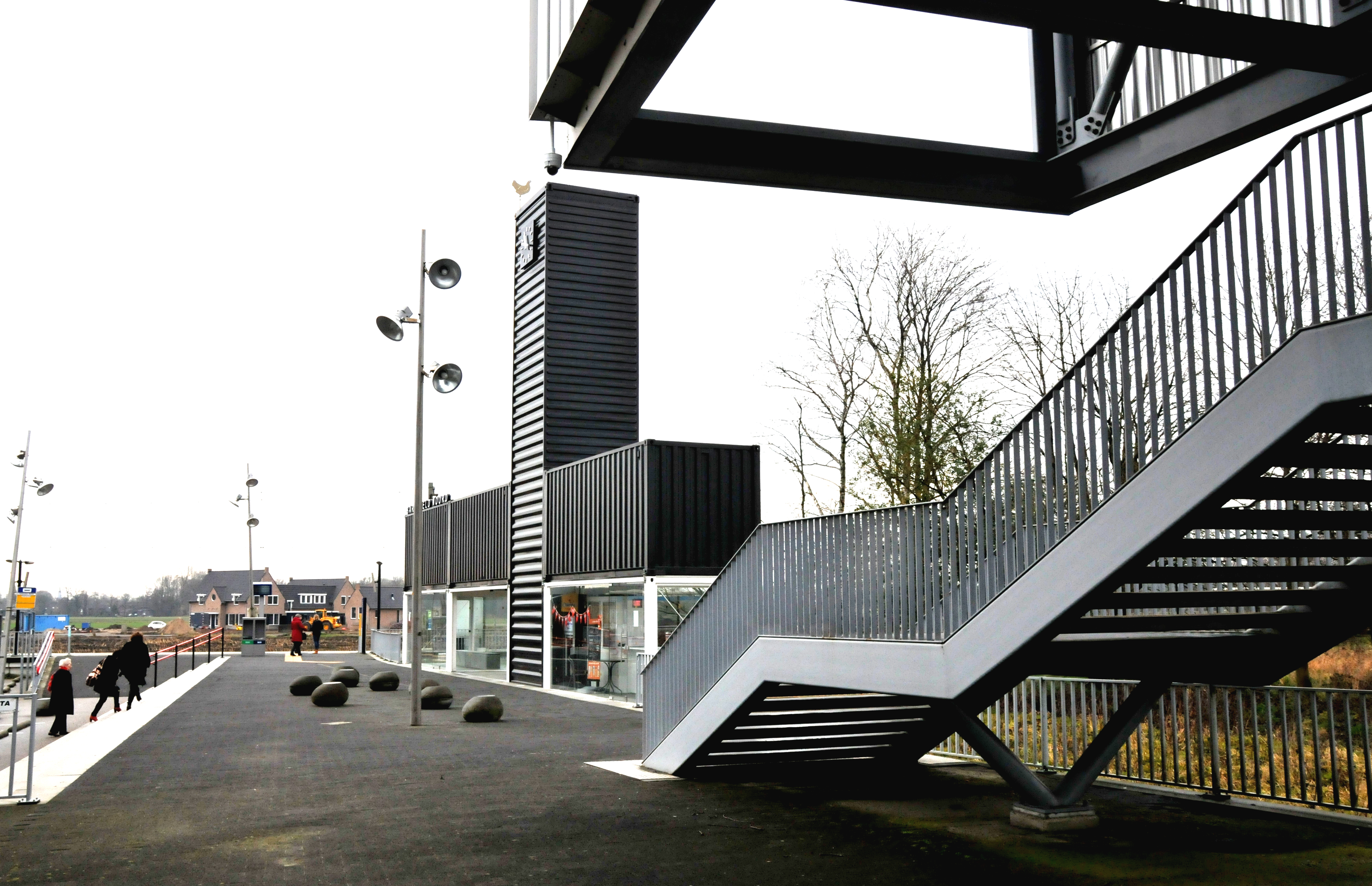

General information
- Location: Netherlands
- Coordinates: 52°09′40″N 5°35′54″E
- Line: Nijkerk–Ede-Wageningen railway

History
- Opened: 1938

Services
Preceding station	Valleilijn	Following station
Hoevelaken towards Amersfoort	Stoptrein 31300	Barneveld Centrum towards Ede-Wageningen
Hoevelaken towards Amersfoort	Stoptrein 31400	Barneveld Centrum towards Barneveld Zuid
Location
- Location within Netherlands

Barneveld Noord is a railway station located in Harselaar and the north of Barneveld, Netherlands. The distance to the railway station from the center of the city Barneveld Centrum is 2.8 kilometers. The station was opened on 15 May 1938 and is located on the Valleilijn. The station closed on 7 September 1944 and re-opened 20 May 1951. Valleilijn trains operated by Connexxion call at this station and were previously operated by Nederlandse Spoorwegen. The station has one platform and since 2006 a park and ride facility called Transferium Barneveld-Noord off the A1 motorway Junction 16.

== Train service ==
As of 11 December 2016, the following local train services call at this station:

- Stoptrein: Amersfoort - Barneveld - Ede-Wageningen
- Stoptrein: Amersfoort - Barneveld

== Bus services ==
- 105: Harderwijk - Ermelo - Putten - Voorthuizen - Barneveld - Kootwijkerbroek - Harskamp - Otterlo - Arnhem

== Gallery ==
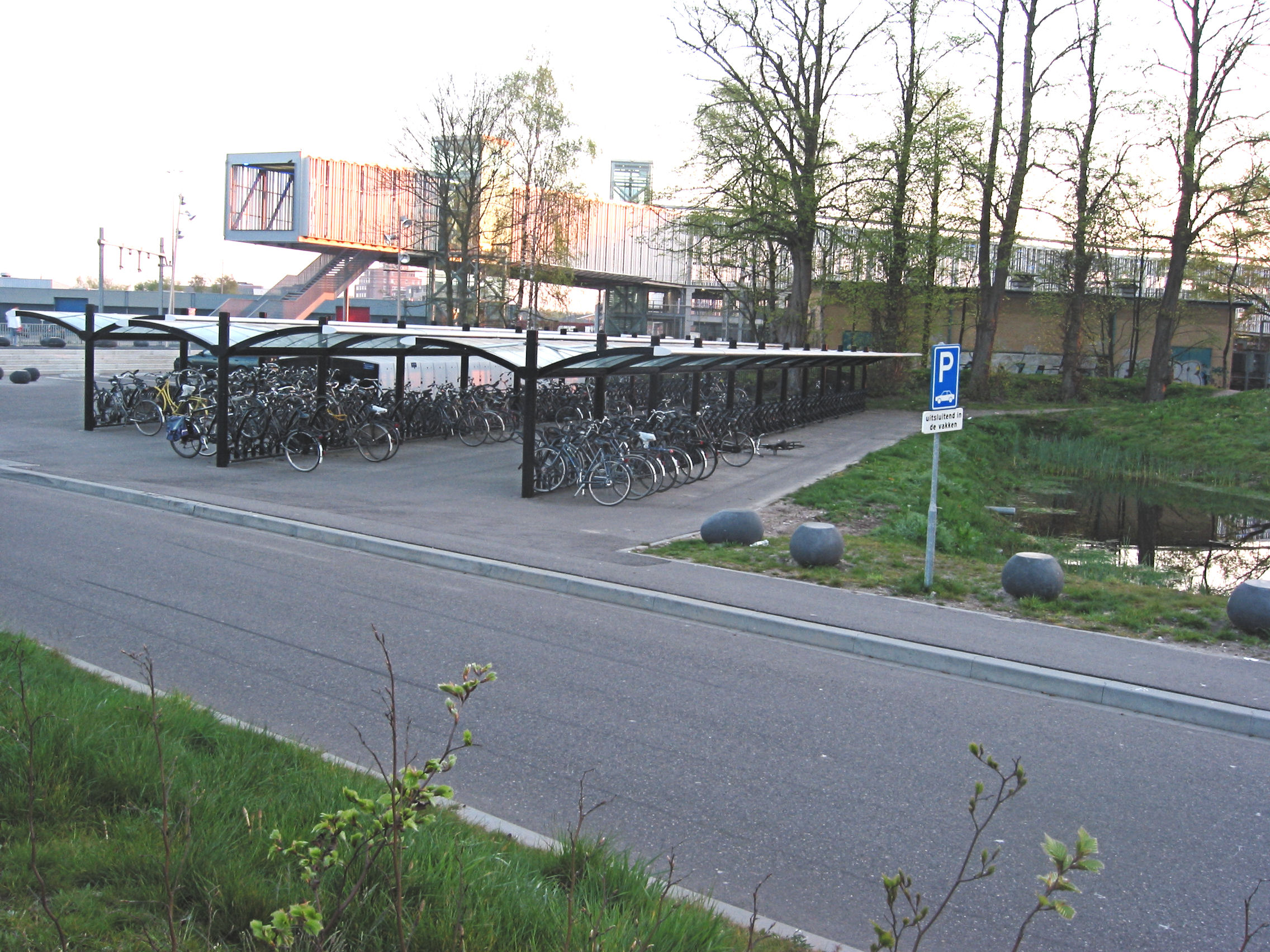
Barneveld Noord looking at walkway to Transferium

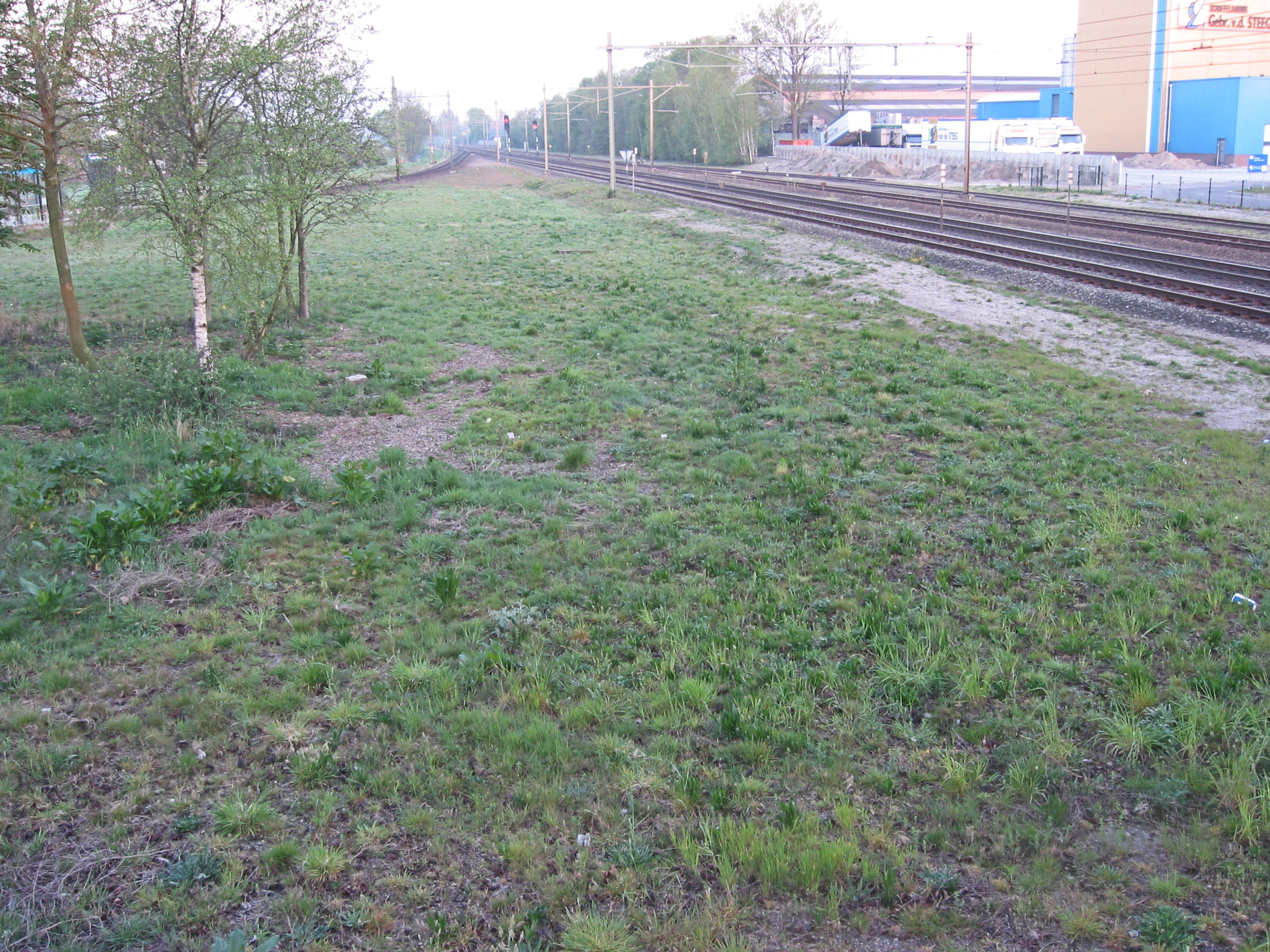
Junction at Barneveld Noord - Left is the station, right is the line to Apeldoorn looking towards Amersfoort

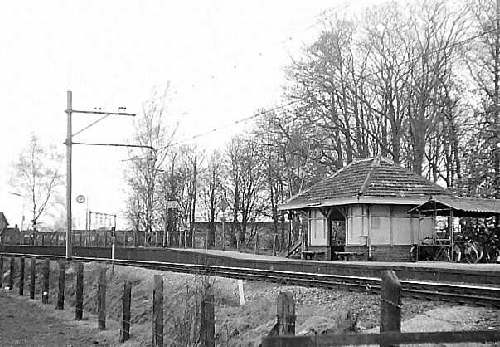
The station in 1950
