= Hoevelaken railway station =

Railway station in the Netherlands

Hoevelaken
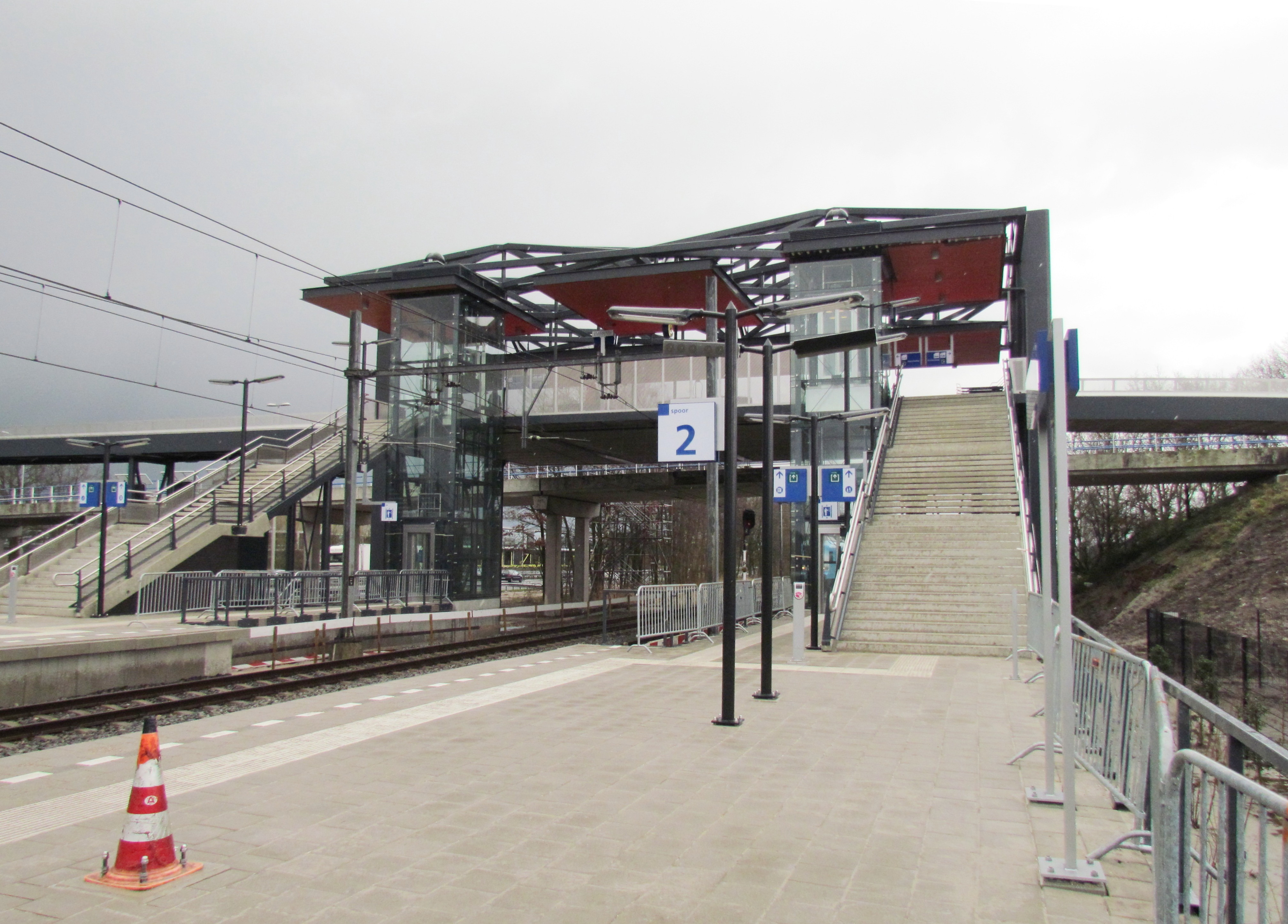

General information
- Location: Netherlands
- Coordinates: 52°09′59″N 5°27′25″E

History
- Opened: 9 December 2012

Services
Preceding station	Valleilijn	Following station
Amersfoort Terminus	Stoptrein 31300	Barneveld Noord towards Ede-Wageningen
Amersfoort Terminus	Stoptrein 31400	Barneveld Noord towards Barneveld Zuid
Location
- Location within Netherlands

Hoevelaken is a railway station in the municipality of Amersfoort (province of Utrecht) near Hoevelaken, the Netherlands. The station lies on the Oosterspoorweg, but is only served by Connexxion trains from the Valleilijn and opened on 9 December 2012. Previously, Hoevelaken had a station on the Utrecht - Zwolle railway line from 1905 to 1938.

== Train services ==
As of 11 December 2016, the following local train services call at this station:

- Stoptrein: Amersfoort - Barneveld - Ede-Wageningen
- Stoptrein: Amersfoort - Barneveld
