= Fahrzeugtechnik Dessau =

Manufacturer of rolling stock

- Founded: 1995
- Defunct: 2023
- Fate: Bankruptcy
- Headquarters: Am Waggonbau 11; D-06844 Dessau, Germany
- Website: http://www.fahrzeugtechnik-dessau.de/

Fahrzeugtechnik Dessau (FTD) was a manufacturer of rolling stock, based in the German city of Dessau. Its activities were continued by Molinari Rail Systems from November 2016 to 2023.

In the Netherlands, Connexxion operates Protos trains built by this company on the Valleilijn.

Since May 2006, Fahrzeugtechnik Dessau had been part of the Russian conglomerate ZAO Transmashholding. After going bankrupt in March 2008, the company was able to restructure. Since December 2008, Fahrzeugtechnik Dessau had been owned by the Romanian Compania de Transport Feroviar Bucuresti S.A. (CTF). The production of Protos trains was not included in this takeover, which meant that Connexxion in the Netherlands would remain the only customer of these trains.

In March 2016, the company filed for bankruptcy again. No new investor was found initially and the company was closed in summer 2016. However, Molinari Rail Systems, a subsidiary of Swiss Molinari Rail, acquired the assets later the same year and reopened the factory in November 2016. By early 2019, the company employed a staff of 75 in Dessau, with sales revenues of about five million Euro in 2018.

In November 2022, Molinari Rail Systems filed for insolvency. A handover to interested successors failed, forcing Molinari Rail to announce the closure of the company. Most of the staff were dismissed in March 2023, with a skeleton crew remaining for a few months for clean-up tasks.

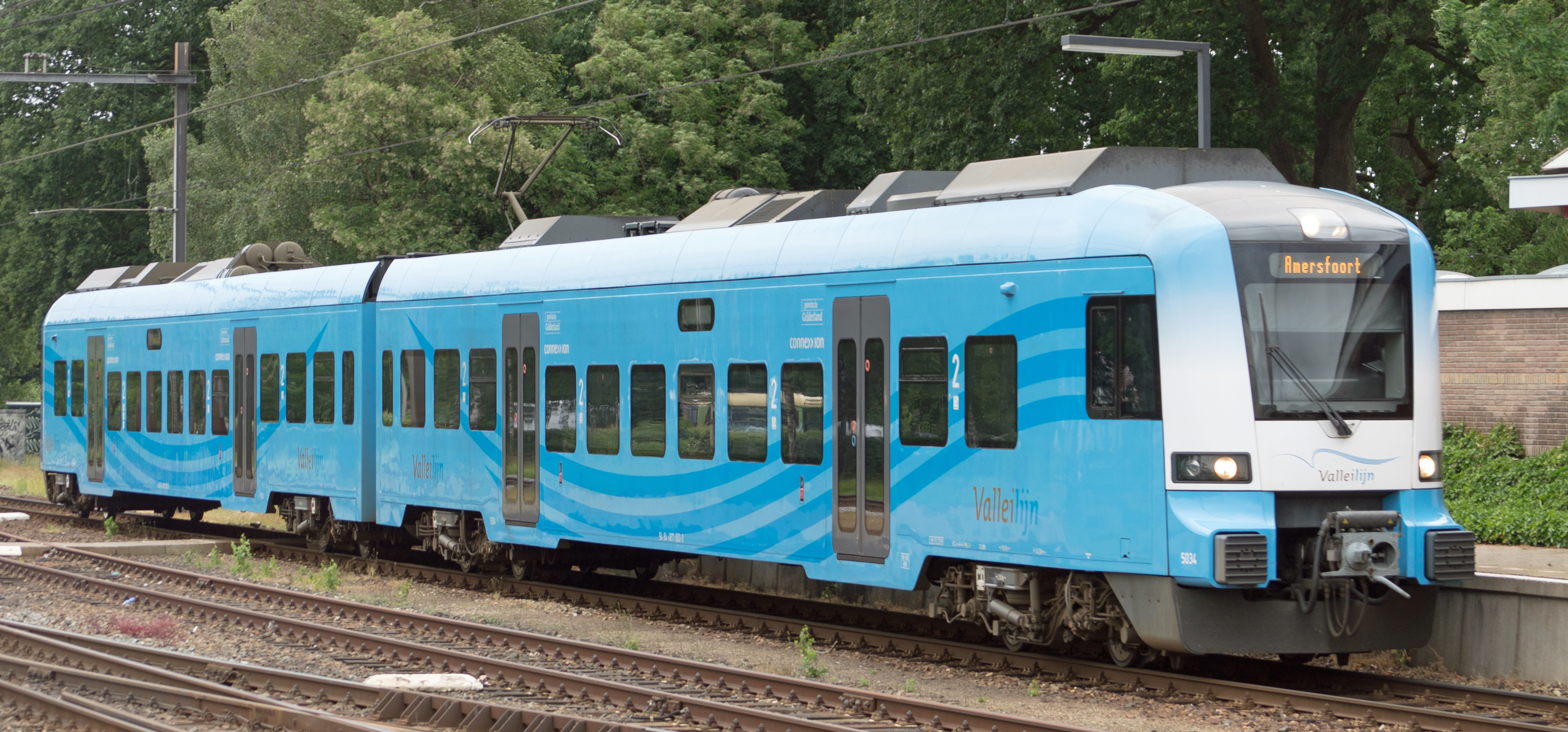
PROTOS on the Dutch Valleilijn
