= Barneveld Centrum railway station =

Railway station in the Netherlands

Barneveld Centrum
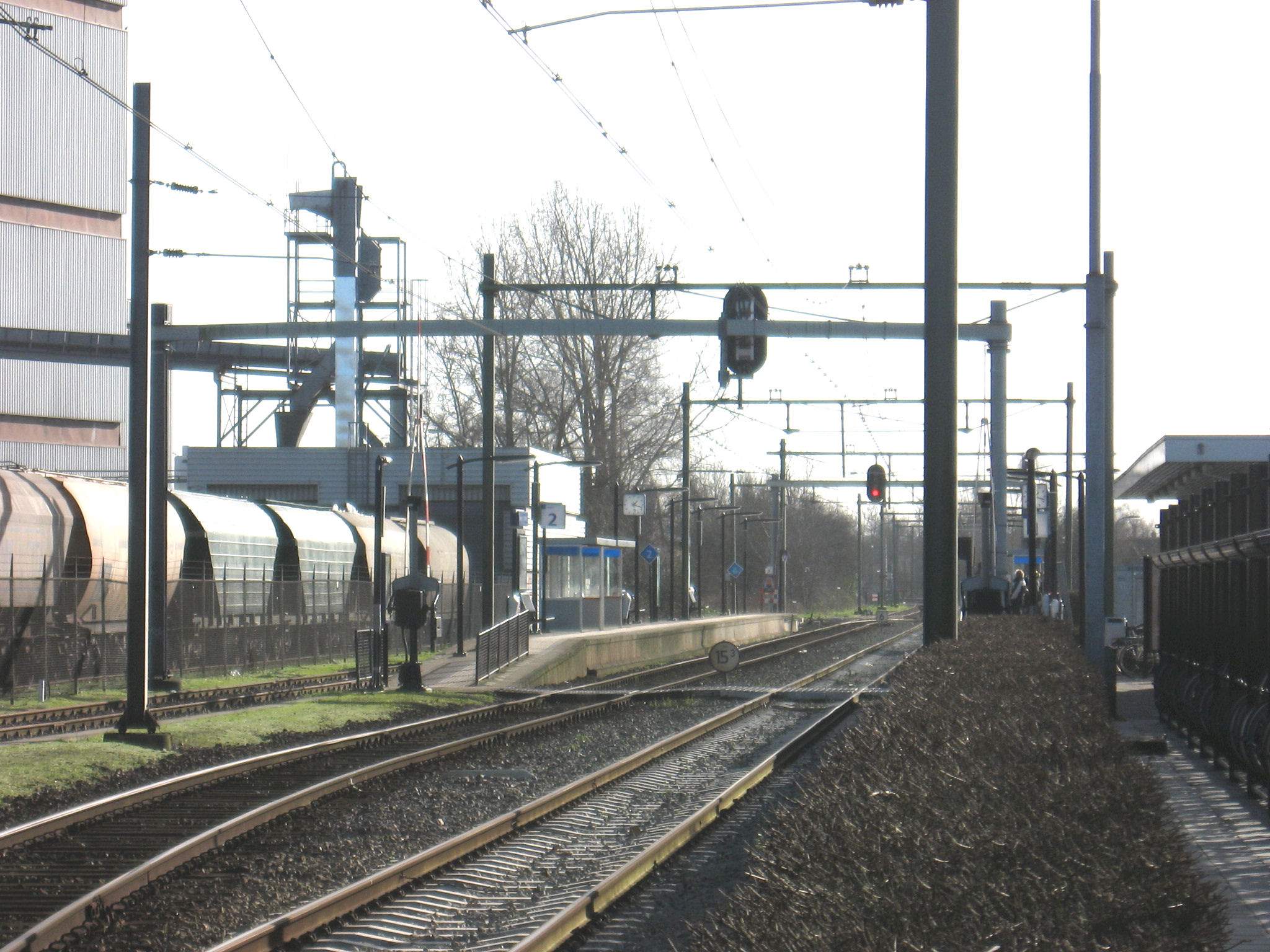

General information
- Location: Netherlands
- Coordinates: 52°08′23″N 5°35′24″E
- Line: Nijkerk–Ede-Wageningen railway

History
- Opened: 1902

Services
Preceding station	Valleilijn	Following station
Barneveld Noord towards Amersfoort	Stoptrein 31300	Barneveld Zuid towards Ede-Wageningen
Barneveld Noord towards Amersfoort	Stoptrein 31400	Barneveld Zuid Terminus
Location
- Location within Netherlands

Barneveld Centrum is a railway station located in Barneveld, Netherlands. The station was opened on 1 May 1902 and is located on the Valleilijn. The station closed on 7 September 1944 and re-opened 20 May 1951. The station is currently operated by Connexxion, previously operated by Nederlandse Spoorwegen.

== Train service ==
As of 11 December 2016, the following local train services call at this station:

- Stoptrein: Amersfoort - Barneveld - Ede-Wageningen
- Stoptrein: Amersfoort - Barneveld

== Bus services ==
- 87 (Barneveld Centrum - Driedorp - Nijkerk) - Syntus, every hour
- 105 (Arnhem - Otterlo - Harskamp - Barneveld Centrum) - Syntus, twice an hour
- 205 (Barneveld Centrum - Voorthuizen - Putten - Ermelo - Harderwijk) - Syntus, twice to 4x per hour
- 509 (Barneveld Centrum - Achterveld - Leusden - Hoevelaken - Nijkerk) - Syntus Buurtbus, every hour
- 511 (Barneveld Centrum - Scherpenzeel) - Syntus Buurtbus, every hour
