= Driebergen-Zeist railway station =

Railway station in the Netherlands

Driebergen-Zeist
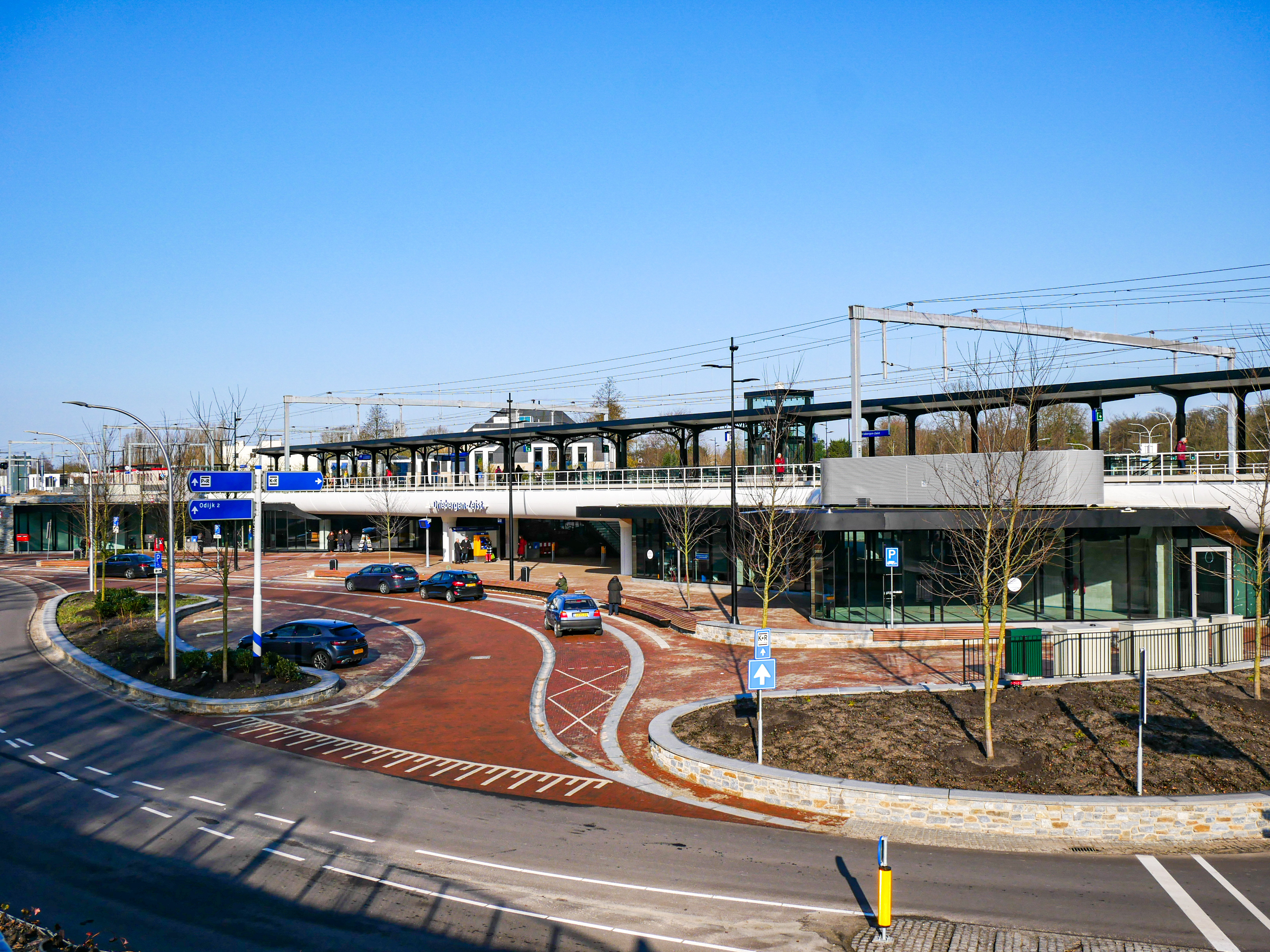

General information
- Location: Netherlands
- Coordinates: 52°03′54″N 5°15′36″E
- Line: Amsterdam–Arnhem railway

Services
Preceding station	Nederlandse Spoorwegen	Following station
Utrecht Centraal towards Den Helder	NS Intercity 3000 Before 19:00	Ede-Wageningen towards Nijmegen
Utrecht Centraal towards Den Helder	NS Intercity 3000 After 19:00	Veenendaal-De Klomp towards Nijmegen
Utrecht Centraal Terminus	NS Nachtnet 21430 Fri/Sat night only	Veenendaal-De Klomp towards Nijmegen
Bunnik towards Breukelen	NS Sprinter 7300	Maarn towards Rhenen
Bunnik towards Uitgeest	NS Sprinter 7400 Peak hours only	Terminus
Location
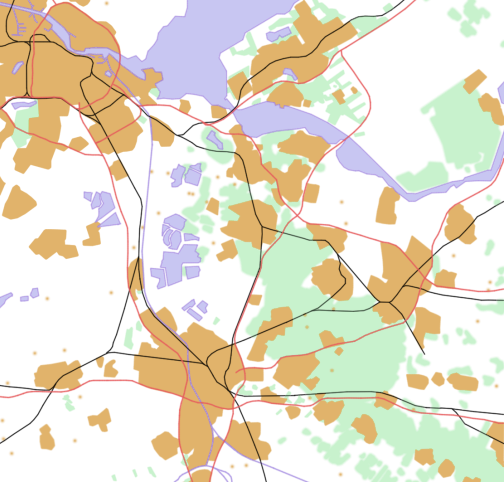
- Location within Northeastern Randstad

Driebergen-Zeist is a railway station located between Driebergen and Zeist, the Netherlands. It is located in the municipality of Utrechtse Heuvelrug. The station was opened on 17 June 1844 and is located on the Amsterdam–Arnhem railway. The station is operated by Nederlandse Spoorwegen. In 2018 there were approximately 8,787 passengers per day using Driebergen-Zeist station. The station was renovated from 2017 to 2020.

== History ==
Construction on the Amsterdam–Arnhem railway (Rhijnspoorweg) started in 1843, which required the Utrecht Hill Ridge towards the east of the station to be dug out. The track between Utrecht and Driebergen was expected to be opened on 15 July 1844, but this was delayed by a few days and it opened on 17 July instead. By the summer of 1845, known as just Driebergen, the station was served three times a day in both directions by the Amsterdam to Arnhem train. A tram service to neighbouring villages such as Langbroek and Wijk bij Duurstede was also available.

By 1855, the station was known as Zeist-Driebergen and was the fourth busiest on the line in terms of both passenger numbers and freight, only falling behind the larger and better connected stations of Amsterdam Weesperpoort, Utrecht and Arnhem. Throughout 1862, only one of the tracks was used due to poor quality of the rails and their foundation. The station got a new building in November 1864 that was larger. In 1894, the municipal council of Zeist granted more subsidy to the tram operator under the condition that a tram would run every time a train arrived at the station, allowing for fast connections between the two transit modes.

Around 1950, the station name was changed to its current name, Driebergen-Zeist. In February 1955, the Nederlandse Spoorwegen (NS) announced that it would make changes to the station. A new entrance would be built on the northern side and the passenger bridge connecting the two platforms would be replaced by a tunnel going beneath the tracks. While initially expected to be completed that same year, the construction was postponed in July after the Rijkswaterstaat asked NS to consider replacing the level crossing next to the station with a tunnel as well. In 1959, construction of the passenger tunnel and the new entrance was given a green light. This time, the whole station was demolished and rebuilt. The new station was ready to use in September 1960. The level crossing was not removed.

The station underwent a major upgrade between 2017 and 2020 which provided additional bicycle parking and removed a nearby level crossing. Jason Slaughter praised the new design on his YouTube channel Not Just Bikes.

== Train services ==
The following services currently call at Driebergen-Zeist:

- 2x per hour Intercity service Schiphol - Utrecht - Arnhem - Nijmegen
- 2x per hour local service (sprinter) (Uitgeest - Amsterdam -) Breukelen - Utrecht - Rhenen
- 2x per hour local service (sprinter) Breukelen - Utrecht - Veenendaal Centrum

== Bus services ==
Bus services depart from a bus station at the front of the station. These include:

- 43 - Zeist - Driebergen - Odijk
- 50 - Utrecht - De Bilt - Zeist - Driebergen - Doorn - Leersum - Amerongen - Elst - Rhenen - Wageningen
- 51 - Utrecht Centraal - Wittevrouwen - De Bilt - Zeist - Driebergen-Zeist
- 56 - Amersfoort - Soesterberg - Huis ter Heide - Zeist - Driebergen - Doorn - Wijk bij Duurstede
- 71 - Nieuwegein - Utrecht Rijnsweerd - De Uithof - De Bilt - Zeist - Driebergen - Doorn
- 75 - Driebergen-Zeist - Rijsenberg
- 81 - Woudenberg - Zeist - Driebergen - Doorn - Leersum - Amerongen - Veenendaal
- 450 Utrecht - De Bilt - Zeist - Driebergen - Doorn - Leersum - Amerongen (Night bus)
