= Veenendaal-De Klomp railway station =

Railway station in the Netherlands

Veenendaal-De Klomp
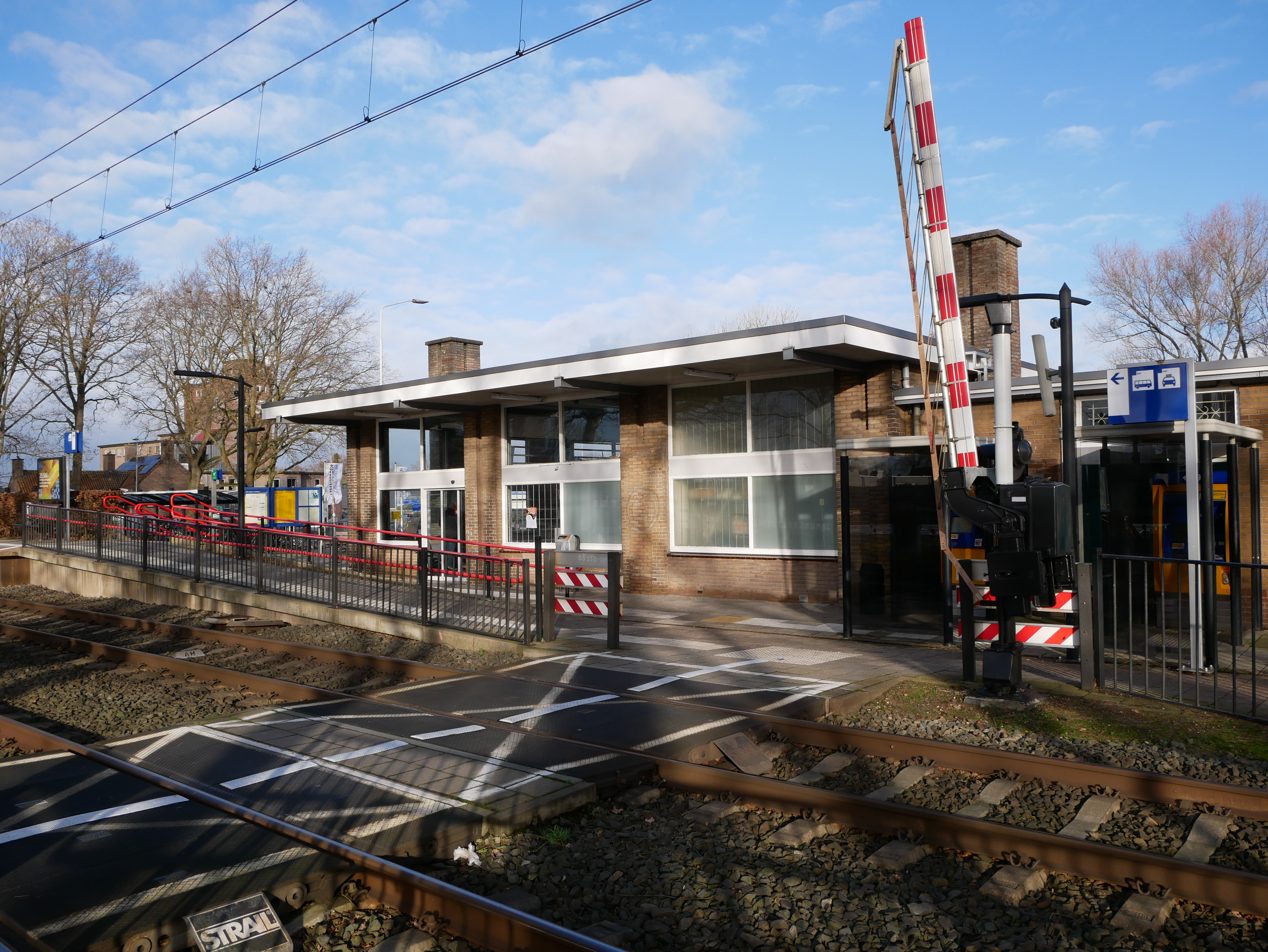

General information
- Location: Netherlands
- Coordinates: 52°2′45″N 5°34′26″E
- Line: Amsterdam–Arnhem railway

History
- Opened: 1845

Services
Preceding station	Nederlandse Spoorwegen	Following station
Driebergen-Zeist towards Den Helder	NS Intercity 3000 Daily after 19:00	Ede-Wageningen towards Nijmegen
Utrecht Centraal towards Den Haag Centraal	NS Intercity 3100 Fri-Sun before 19:00	Ede-Wageningen towards Nijmegen
Utrecht Centraal towards Rotterdam Centraal	NS Intercity 3200 Mon-Thurs before 19:00	Ede-Wageningen towards Arnhem Centraal
Driebergen-Zeist towards Utrecht Centraal	NS Nachtnet 21430 Fri/Sat night only	Ede-Wageningen towards Nijmegen
Location
- Location within Netherlands

Veenendaal-De Klomp is a railway station located in De Klomp near Veenendaal, Netherlands. The station opened in 1845 and is on the Amsterdam–Arnhem railway. It lies within the borders of the municipality of Ede.

== Train services ==
The following services currently call at Veenendaal-De Klomp:

- 2x per hour intercity services Schiphol - Amsterdam-Zuid - Bijlmer ArenA - Utrecht - Veenendaal-De Klomp - Ede-Wageningen - Arnhem - Nijmegen

== Bus services ==
- Line 80 Amersfoort - Leusden - Woudenberg - Scherpenzeel - Renswoude - Station Veenendaal De Klomp - Station Veenendaal Centrum
- Line 50 Utrecht Central Station- Station Driebergen Zeist - Doorn - Amerongen - Elst -Station Veenendaal Centrum - Station Veenendaal de Klomp
- Line 83 Station Veenendaal de Klomp - Station Veenendaal West - Station Veenendaal Centrum
- Line 87 Station Veenendaal de Klomp - Veenendaal Oost
- Citybus 5 Station Veenendaal de Klomp -Kernhem - Station Ede Centrum - Station Ede Wageningen
- Neighborhood bus 505 Overberg - Veenendaal - De Klomp - Ederveen - Lunteren - Wekerom
