= WEpods =

Dutch public transportation system

WEpods was a Dutch public transportation system and the world's first self-driving electric shuttle to be implemented at scale. In 2019, the experiment was terminated and the pods were donated to polytechnical schools after the province Gelderland cancelled its funding. The WEpods never ran the total trajectory between Ede-Wageningen railway station and the campus of Wageningen University and Research, as planned, but only transported people across the campus, while some test drives had been demo-ed near Wageningen station to show its ability to drive in a city environment. The WEpods have been tested over a longer period at Weeze airport (Germany) where they drove a shuttle trajectory to bring passengers from a parking lot to the departure / arrival hall. There had been some subsequent demo's at Schiphol Airport on a shuttle trajectory from long term parking to the departure hall. The WEpods had been designed by the Cognitive Robotics Group of the Delft University of Technology together with its startups Robot Care Systems & Robot Engineered Systems, notably using senors data fusion of lidars, radars and cameras, and machine learning and AI based path planning, obstacle avoidance and control. In a subsequent project with the same partners and others in an EU Inter Regional Project the Mission Automated Bus was developed. As this project aimed at shuttle busses for public transport or special transport in rural areas, in this project a driver drives a trajectory to make a "virtual tram rail" that can then automatically be driven by the bus, with or without driver but likely with a steward for the passengers in case of special transport. After severe testing at airport Valkenburg near Leiden, the bus was finally demo-ed at the Aldenhoven Test Track near Aachen (Germany). Sadly both WEpods and Mission bus projects did not have a follow up towards commercialization due to the bankruptcy of the involved startups, largely because follow up investments stalled due to COVID-19.
