= Ede Centrum railway station =

Railway station in the Netherlands

Ede Centrum
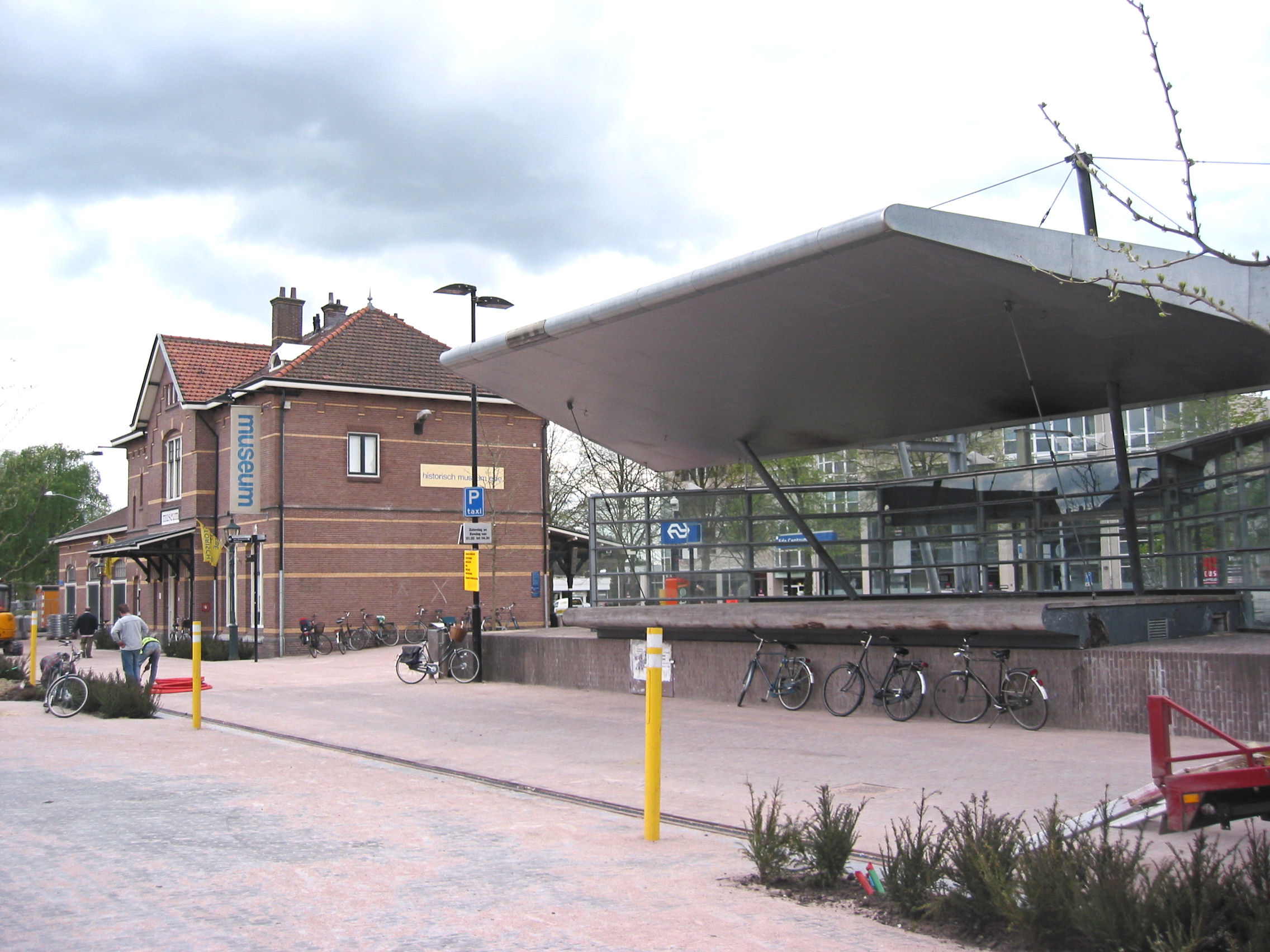

General information
- Location: Netherlands
- Coordinates: 52°02′35″N 5°40′05″E
- Line: Nijkerk–Ede-Wageningen railway

History
- Opened: 1902

Services
Preceding station	Valleilijn	Following station
Lunteren towards Amersfoort	Stoptrein 31300	Ede-Wageningen Terminus
Location
- Location within Netherlands

Ede Centrum is a railway station located in Ede, Netherlands. The station was opened on 1 May 1902 and is located on the Nijkerk–Ede-Wageningen railway. The station closed on 7 September 1944 and re-opened 20 May 1951. Connexxion took over the train services on this line from Nederlandse Spoorwegen on 10 December 2006, under the brand Valleilijn.

== Train services ==
As of 11 December 2016, the following local train services call at this station:

- Stoptrein: Amersfoort - Barneveld - Ede-Wageningen
