= GVU (Utrecht) =

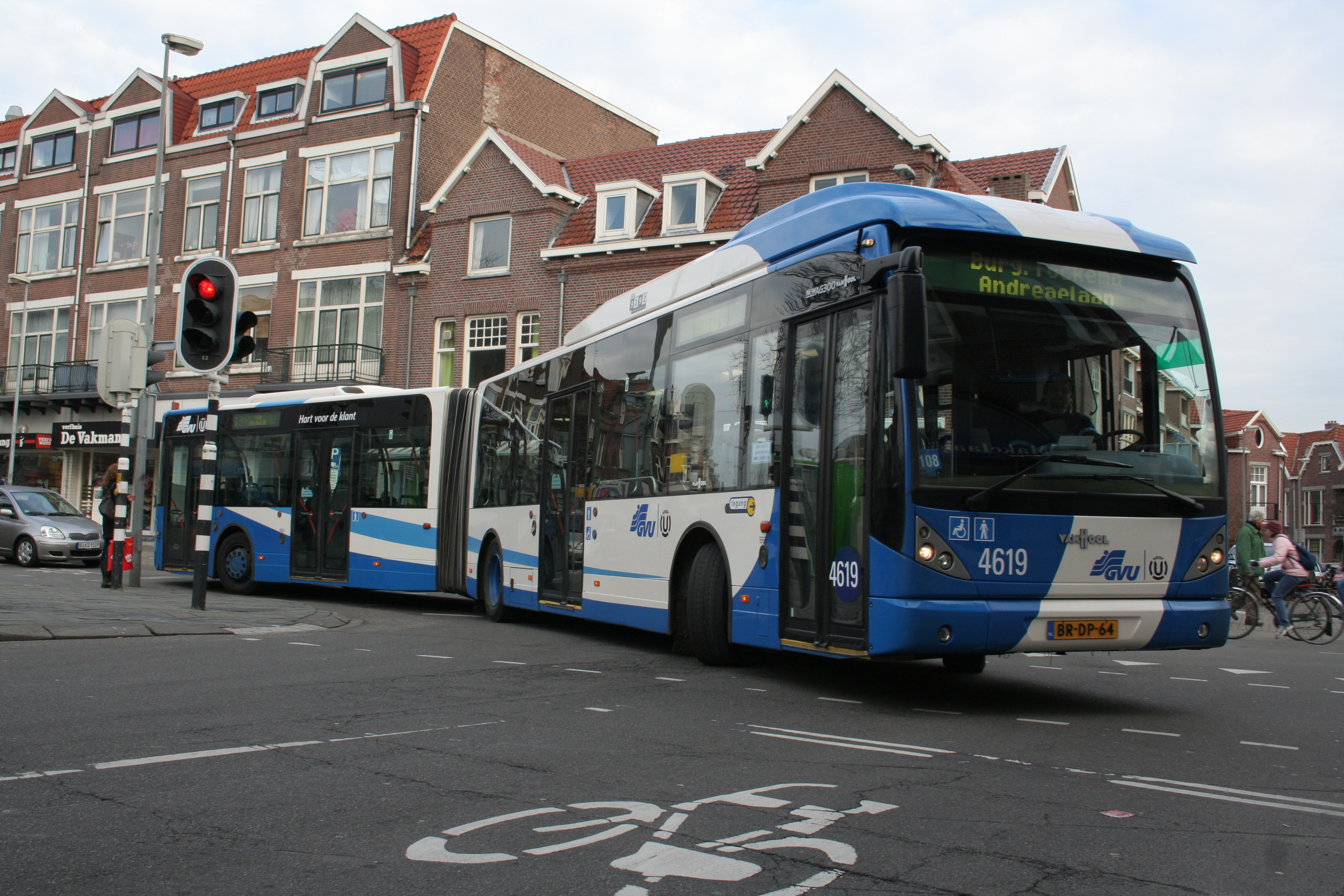
- A GVU Van Hool articulated bus
- Founded: 1904
- Locale: Utrecht
- Service type: Urban bus service
- Routes: 37
- Depots: Europalaan, Utrecht
- Fleet: 194 (2007)
- Website: www.gvu.nl

Gemeente vervoerbedrijf Utrecht (GVU) (English:Utrecht municipal transport) was the operator of city buses in Utrecht, Netherlands until December 2013. It is replaced by Qbuzz.

== History ==
Connexxion took GVU over on 1 January 2007. Since December 2013 Qbuzz took over the operation of city services in Utrecht. In 2000 GVU carried 30 million passengers and this figure continues to rise with 39 million passengers in 2006. GVU used 25m long Van Hool AGG300 buses on routes 11, 12, 12s and occasionally 31. For these routes changes to the road layouts were made.

== Fleet ==
GVU used mostly Van Hool buses, along with a number of former Connexxion.
