= Amsterdam–Arnhem railway =

Railway line in Netherlands

Amsterdam–Arnhem railway Rhijnspoorweg
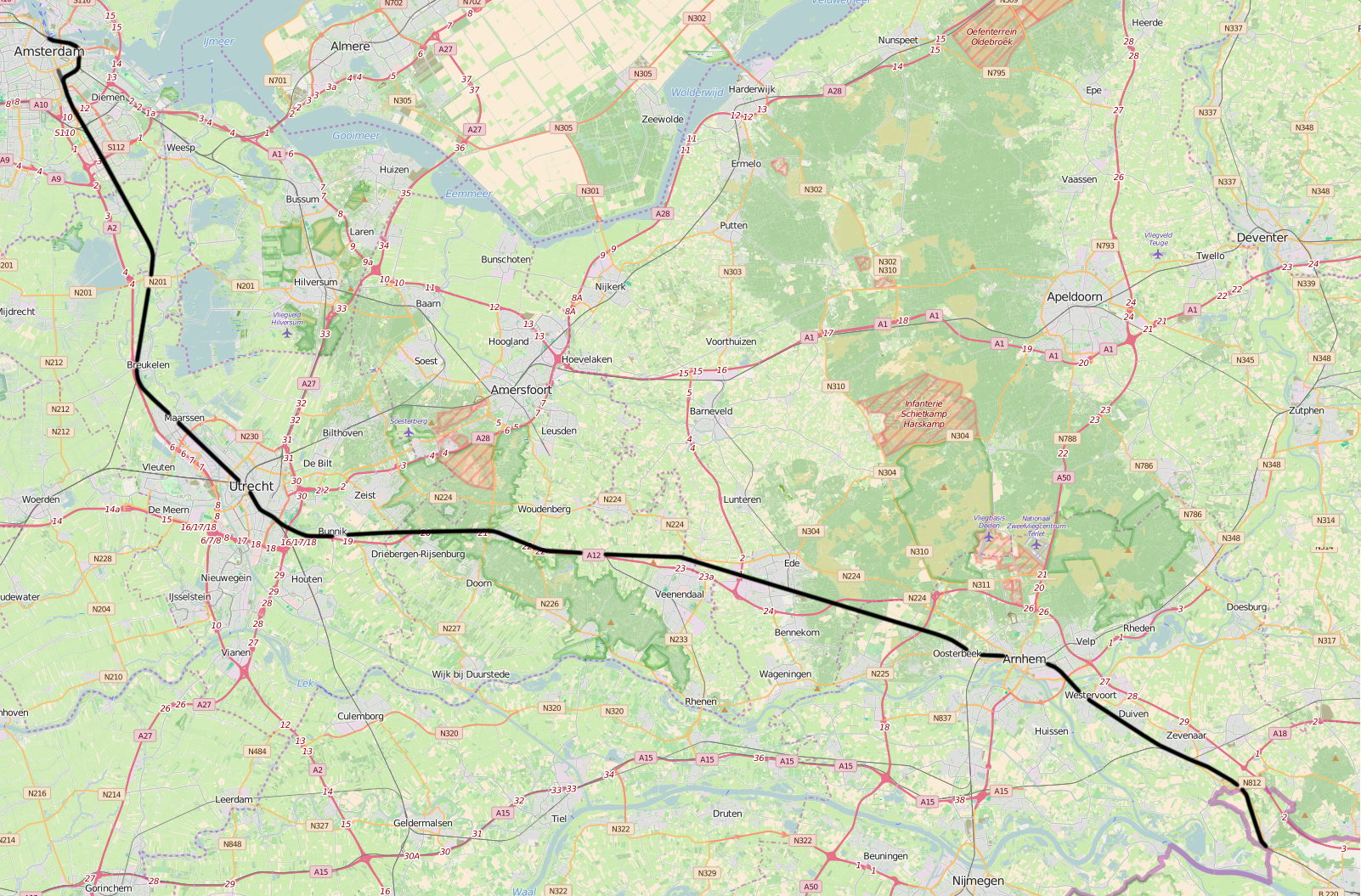

Overview
- Status: Operational
- Locale: Netherlands, Germany
- Termini: Amsterdam Centraal; Arnhem Centraal
- Stations: 23

Service
- Operator(s): Nederlandse Spoorwegen

History
- Opened: 1843–1856

Technical
- Line length: 118.6 km (73.7 mi)
- Number of tracks: 4 (Amsterdam Bijlmer–Utrecht Centraal); 2 (Amsterdam Centraal–Amsterdam Bijlmer; Utrecht Centraal–Elten)
- Track gauge: 1,435 mm (4 ft 8 1/2 in) standard gauge
- Old gauge: 1,945 mm (6 ft 4 9/16 in)
- Electrification: 1.5 kV DC Catenary
- Operating speed: 140 km/h (87 mph), Amsterdam Centraal–Bijlmer; 160 km/h (99 mph), Amsterdam Bijlmer–Utrecht; 140 km/h (87 mph), Utrecht–Arnhem; 130 km/h (81 mph), Arnhem–Elten

The Amsterdam–Arnhem railway, also referred to as the Amsterdam–Elten railway or Rhijnspoorweg in Dutch (English: Rhine railway), is an important railway that connects Amsterdam in the Netherlands with Utrecht and Arnhem, and continues into Germany.

== History ==
The railway was opened in several stages by the Nederlandsche Rhijnspoorweg-Maatschappij (NRS) between 18 December 1843 and 15 February 1856, with construction starting in 1843. The line was electrified in 1938 between Amsterdam and Arnhem and in 1966 between Arnhem and Elten. The line has been heavily reconstructed to increase its capacity between Amsterdam Bijmer Arena and Utrecht Centraal; this began in 1999 and finished in 2008.

== Route ==
The line leaves Amsterdam in an easterly direction with the line to Amersfoort, which leaves at Amsterdam Muiderpoort, the line then continues in a southerly direction and shortly before arriving at Amsterdam Amstel, the metro lines 51, 53 and 54 operate between the line. Duivendrecht is a bi-level station with the Schiphollijn operating below. Freight lines from the Weesp direction join and the Utrecht Curve from Schiphol joins the line. At Amsterdam Holendrecht the metro lines 50 and 54 leave towards the east. The line continues travelling through the countryside and a few towns towards Utrecht, often running parallel to the Amsterdam–Rhine Canal. At Breukelen the line to Gouda leaves the line. On approaching Utrecht Centraal the lines from Rotterdam and Amersfoort join.

From Utrecht Centraal the line continues in an easterly direction, with the line from Hilversum joining and crossing over, with the line to 's-Hertogenbosch leaving southwards. 7 km (4.3 mi) east of Maarn the line to Rhenen leaves. At Ede-Wageningen the line from Amersfoort via Barneveld joins. Shortly before arriving at Arnhem the line from Nijmegen joins and after Arnhem Velperpoort the line to Zutphen heads north-east. At Zevenaar, the line to Winterswijk leaves in a north-easterly direction, while the freight Betuweroute from Rotterdam joins the line before continuing towards Germany. 4 km (2.5 mi) later the line crosses the Dutch-German border and continues towards Emmerich, where the railway becomes the Emmerich-Oberhausen railway and continues east.

=== Main stations ===
The main stations on the Rhijnspoorweg railway are:

- Amsterdam Centraal railway station
- Amsterdam Bijlmer ArenA railway station
- Utrecht Centraal railway station
- Ede-Wageningen railway station
- Arnhem
- Emmerich

== Train services ==
The Rhijnspoorweg is used by the following passenger services:

- International services along the whole line (Amsterdam – Frankfurt)
- Intercity services between Amsterdam and Arnhem (Alkmaar – Heerlen; Den Helder – Nijmegen; Schiphol Airport – Nijmegen; Zwolle – Roosendaal)
- Stoptrein services between Amsterdam and Zevenaar (Uitgeest – Rotterdam; Breukelen – Rhenen; Ede-Wageningen – Arnhem; Nijmegen – Zutphen; Arnhem – Winterswijk)

== Train types ==
A wide variety of trains can be found regularly on the Rhijnspoorweg:

- ICE 3neo on the Amsterdam – Frankfurt service on the whole line.
- Locomotive-hauled trains from Germany.
- NS DD-IRM on the Alkmaar – Heerlen service between Amsterdam Centraal and Utrecht Centraal, Den Helder – Nijmegen service between Amsterdam Centraal and Arnhem, Schiphol Airport – Eindhoven service between Amsterdam Bijlmer ArenA and Utrecht Centraal, Schiphol Airport – Nijmegen service between Amsterdam Bijlmer ArenA and Arnhem, and Zwolle – Roosendaal between Arnhem and Arnhem Velperpoort.
- NS Koploper on the Zwolle – Roosendaal between Arnhem and Arnhem Velperpoort.
- NS Sprinter on the Uitgeest – Rotterdam service between Amsterdam Centraal and Breukelen, Breukelen – Rhenen service between Breukelen and Maarn, Ede-Wageningen – Arnhem service between Ede-Wageningen and Arnhem and Nijmegen – Zutphen services between Arnhem and Arnhem Velperpoort.
- SLT on the Uitgeest – Rotterdam service between Amsterdam Centraal and Breukelen and Breukelen – Rhenen service between Breukelen and Maarn.
- Arriva/Breng GTW on the Arnhem – Winterswijk/Doetinchem service between Arnhem and Zevenaar.
- NS FLIRT on the Ede-Wageningen – Arnhem service.

Large numbers of freight trains also operate along the line.

== See also ==
- Nederlandsche Rhijnspoorweg-Maatschappij
