= Barneveld (town) =

- Town
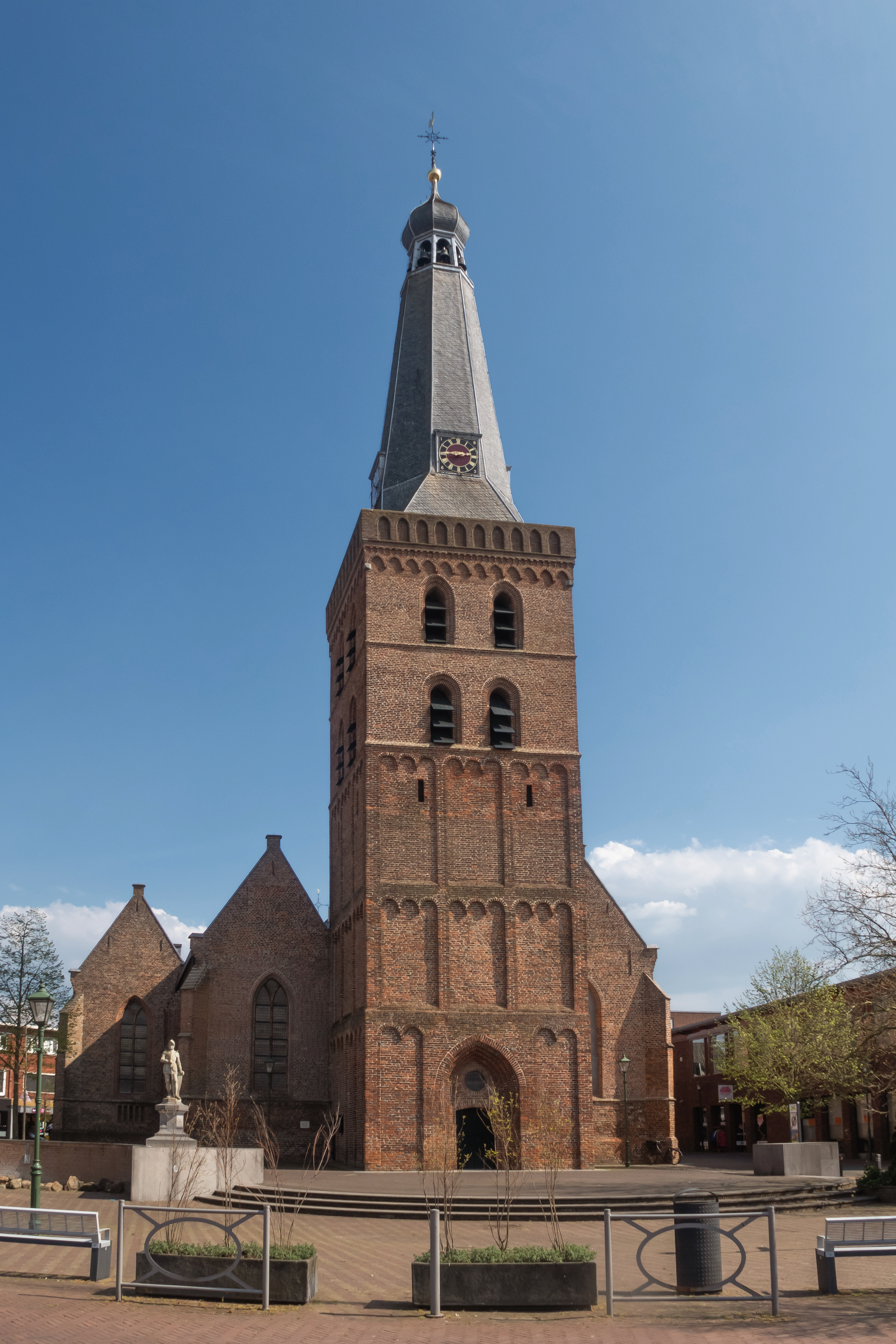
- Church in Barneveld

- Flag Coat of arms

- Location within Gelderland Location within Netherlands
- Coordinates: 52°8′N 5°35′E
- Country: Netherlands
- Province: Gelderland
- Elevation: 10 m (33 ft)

Population (2017)
  - Total: 57,134
- Demonym: Barnevelder
- Time zone: UTC+1 (CET)
  - Summer (DST): UTC+2 (CEST)
- Postcode: 3770, 3771, 3772, 3773
- Website: http://www.barneveld.nl

Barneveld is a town in the Dutch province of Gelderland and also the administrative center of the eponymous municipality.

== Transport ==
Barneveld is served by Connexxion at three train stations. Barneveld Centrum is in the centre of Barneveld and the Barneveld Noord railway station in the village of Harselaar, where there is a Park & Ride facility and Barneveld Zuid railway station in the newly constructed area known as Veller.

Barneveld is also connected by the A1 and A30 motorways, as well as provincial roads N301, N344, N800, N802, and N805.

== Economy ==
Due to the central geographic location of the city and its close proximity to major transport routes Barneveld has become a foundry for innovative industry. Moba, the world's largest manufacturer of egg grading and packing machines. Baan was a longtime leader in the ERP market before it almost collapsed due to "creative" revenue manipulation. Bettink Service en Onderhoud, which is the biggest brand independent wind turbine service company in the Netherlands. Eltomation, which has been involved in the development and worldwide supply of over 160 complete plants and projects for the production of Cement Bonded Boards. EeStairs, that created a DNA-inspired staircase and designed a space-saving stair solution that fits into a tiny 90-by-90-centimetre (3-by-3-foot) space. Paperfoam, a company that is specialised in environmental friendly packaging with a very low carbon footprint. Other locally well known companies are Vink, De Heus, founded in Barneveld, current HQ in Ede, Netherlands and the Royal BDU Publishing.

== Education ==
There are 3 secondary schools in Barneveld:

- Johannes Fontanus College
- De Meerwaarde
- Van Lodenstein College

== Notable residents ==
- Jacobus Cornelius Kapteyn (1851–1922), astronomer
- Eduard Daniel van Oort (1876–1933), ornithologist
- Egbert Adriaan Kreiken (1896–1964), teacher and astronomer
- Jaap Romijn (born 1943), custom furniture maker, illustrator and father of American actress Rebecca Romijn
- Conny van Bentum (born 1965), freestyle swimmer
- Alfred Schreuder (born 1972), footballer and football coach
- Sander van de Streek (born 1993), footballer

== See also ==
- De Hoeksteen, Barneveld (church)
- Barnevelder
- Barneveldse Krant
- Camp Barneveld
