= Nijkerk–Ede-Wageningen railway =

Railway line in the Netherlands

Overview
- Status: Operational
- Locale: The Netherlands
- Termini: Nijkerk railway station; Ede-Wageningen railway station

Service
- Operator(s): 1902-2006 Nederlandse Spoorwegen since 2006: Connexxion

History
- Opened: 1902-1903

Technical
- Line length: 30 km (19 mi)
- Number of tracks: single track
- Track gauge: 1,435 mm (4 ft 8 1/2 in) standard gauge
- Electrification: 1.5 kV DC

The Nijkerk–Ede-Wageningen railway is a railway line in the Netherlands currently running from Barneveld to Ede-Wageningen. The part between Nijkerk and Barneveld has been demolished. It was previously nicknamed the Kippenlijn ("chicken line") in Dutch, but since 2006, it's nicknamed Valleilijn ("valley line") by its operator (Connexxion).

== The line ==
The Valleilijn is a single track line with passing loops at Barneveld Centrum and Lunteren. It runs through the valley where there are many chicken farms and was therefore originally called the Kippenlijn until a project was launched on 10 December 2006.

The line has interchanges with other railway services at Amersfoort and Ede-Wageningen.

== History ==
The line opened on 1 May 1902 as the Kippenlijn from Nijkerk to Ede. The line between Nijkerk and Barneveld Noord closed in 1937 and the whole line was shut on 7 September 1944 because of World War II.

The line re-opened on 20 May 1951 and was electrified for that date as well. The line operates as the Oosterspoorweg between Amersfoort and the Barneveld Noord junction. From there the line is 17 km long and takes 20 minutes to operate from Barneveld Noord to Ede-Wageningen.

== Stations ==
The following stations are on or serviced by the Valleilijn (Hoevelaken is technically situated on the Oosterspoorweg), including some possible interchanges:

Station	Interchanges	Notes
Amersfoort Centraal	Zwolle, Apeldoorn, Deventer, Utrecht, Hilversum, Amsterdam, Gouda, The Hague and Rotterdam	Previously known as Amersfoort (1902–2019).
Hoevelaken		Previously, Hoevelaken had a station on the Utrecht – Zwolle railway line from 1905 to 1938.
Barneveld Noord		P&R Site, signposted off the A1 (Transferium). Previously known as Barneveld-Voorthuizen (1937–1981).
Barneveld Centrum		Previously known as Barneveld Dorp (1902–1981).
Barneveld Zuid		Newest station on the line; opened on 2 February 2015.
Lunteren		
Ede Centrum		Previously known as Ede Dorp (1902–1951).
Ede-Wageningen	Utrecht and Arnhem	Previously known as Ede (1845–1938).

== Previous stations ==
Driedorp, Appel, Dusschoten, Voorthuizen, Barneveld Kruispunt, Meulunteren, Doesburgerbuurt, Stompekamp and Ede Gemeentehuis.

== 2006 Service improvements ==
Before 10 December 2006, the line was operated by Nederlandse Spoorwegen but on that date, Connexxion took over the service and made a lot of improvements.

=== Train ===
5 new Protos train sets were placed into service, to improve comfort on the line. 2 Stadler FLIRT 3 train sets were also put into service in 2018.

=== Buses ===
From 10 December 2006 Syntus, also relaunched the bus service 88 (Ede – Wageningen). A fleet of brand new buses were placed into service in the same Valleilijn livery. This service operates up to every 10 minutes.

Passengers can connect with the train from/to Amersfoort.

From 10 December 2020 introduced a new name rrreis instead of the "Valleilijn" brand.

From 12 December 2022 Transdev took over the RRReis bus services due to the company being accused of fraudulent activities. Due to low state funding most of these buses are old Bravo, R-Net & connexxion buses.

Line	Route	Material	Frequency
303	Wageningen Via Campus	C2 Capacity	4x per hour (Peak 6)

== Train services ==
Series	Train Type	Route	Material	Frequency
31300 RS 34	Connexxion Stoptrein	Amersfoort – Barneveld Noord – Barneveld Centrum – Barneveld Zuid – Lunteren – Ede Centrum – Ede-Wageningen	Protos, Flirt-3	2x per hour
31400 RS 34	Connexxion Stoptrein	Amersfoort – Barneveld Noord – Barneveld Centrum – Barneveld Zuid	Protos, Flirt-3	2x per hour (Mo-Fri until 8 pm, Sa until 5 pm, does not run on Sundays and on holidays)

== Gallery ==
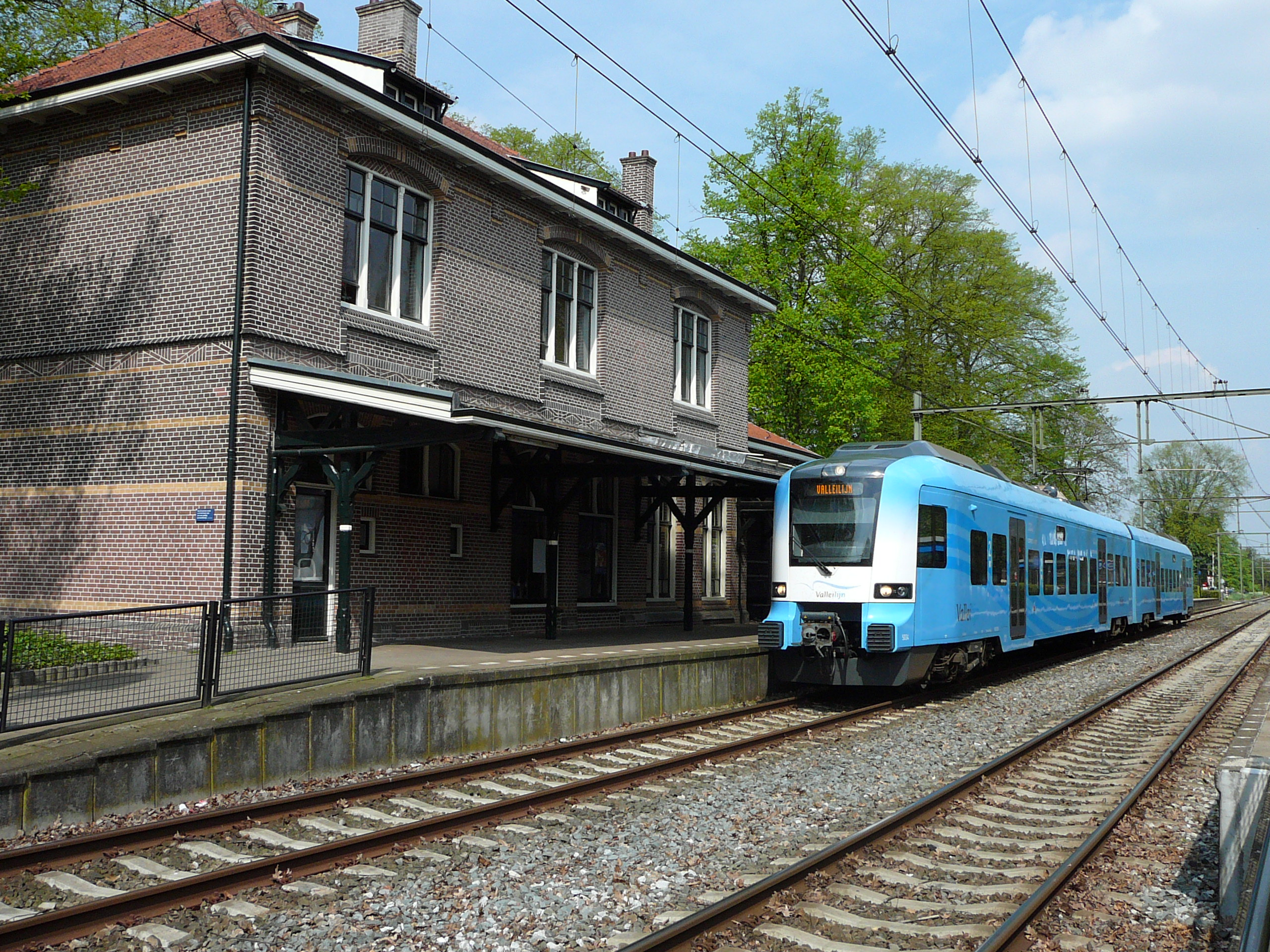
Protos unit 5034 at Lunteren on 3 May 2008

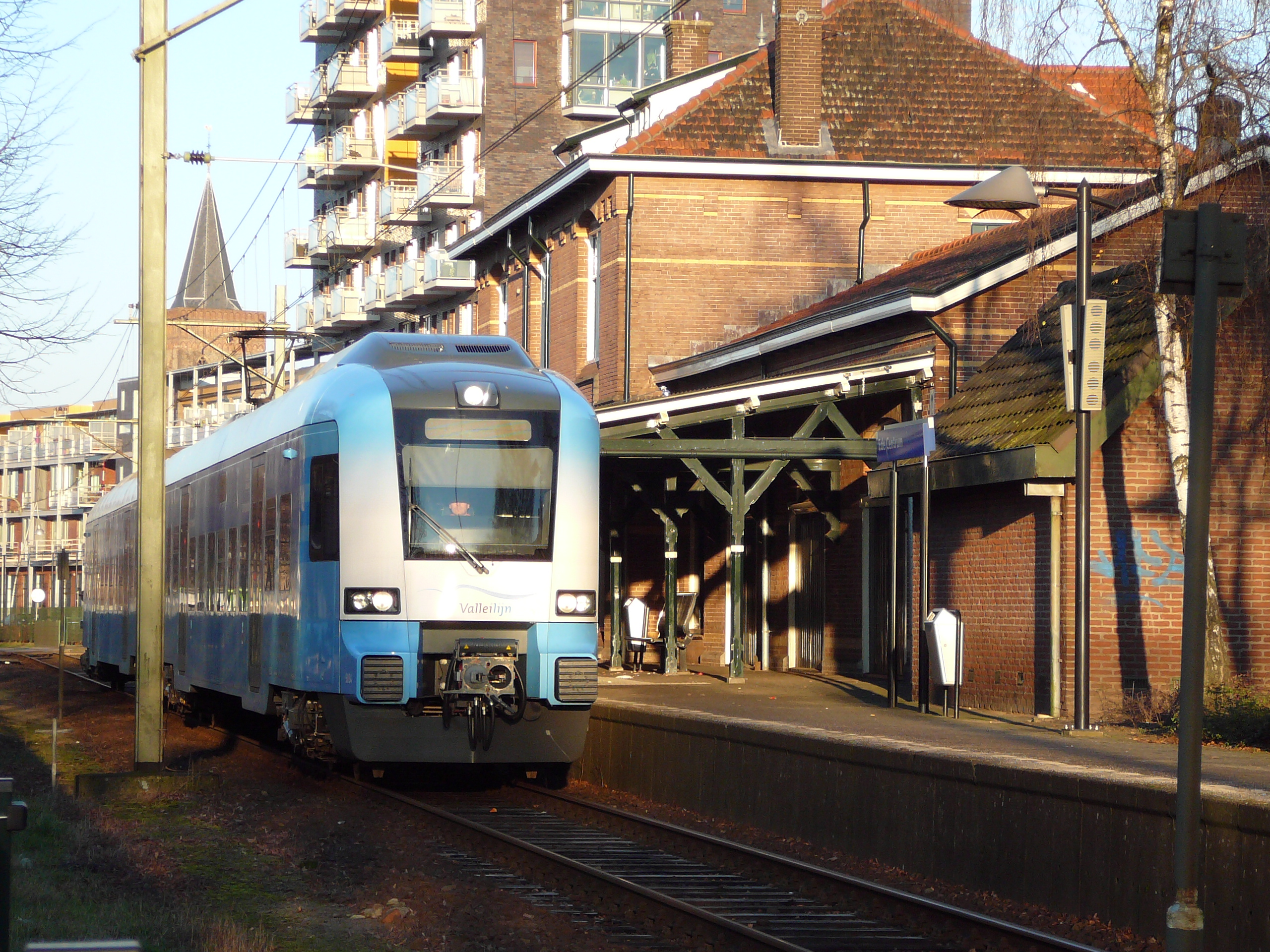
Protos unit 5034 at Ede Centrum on 16 December 2007

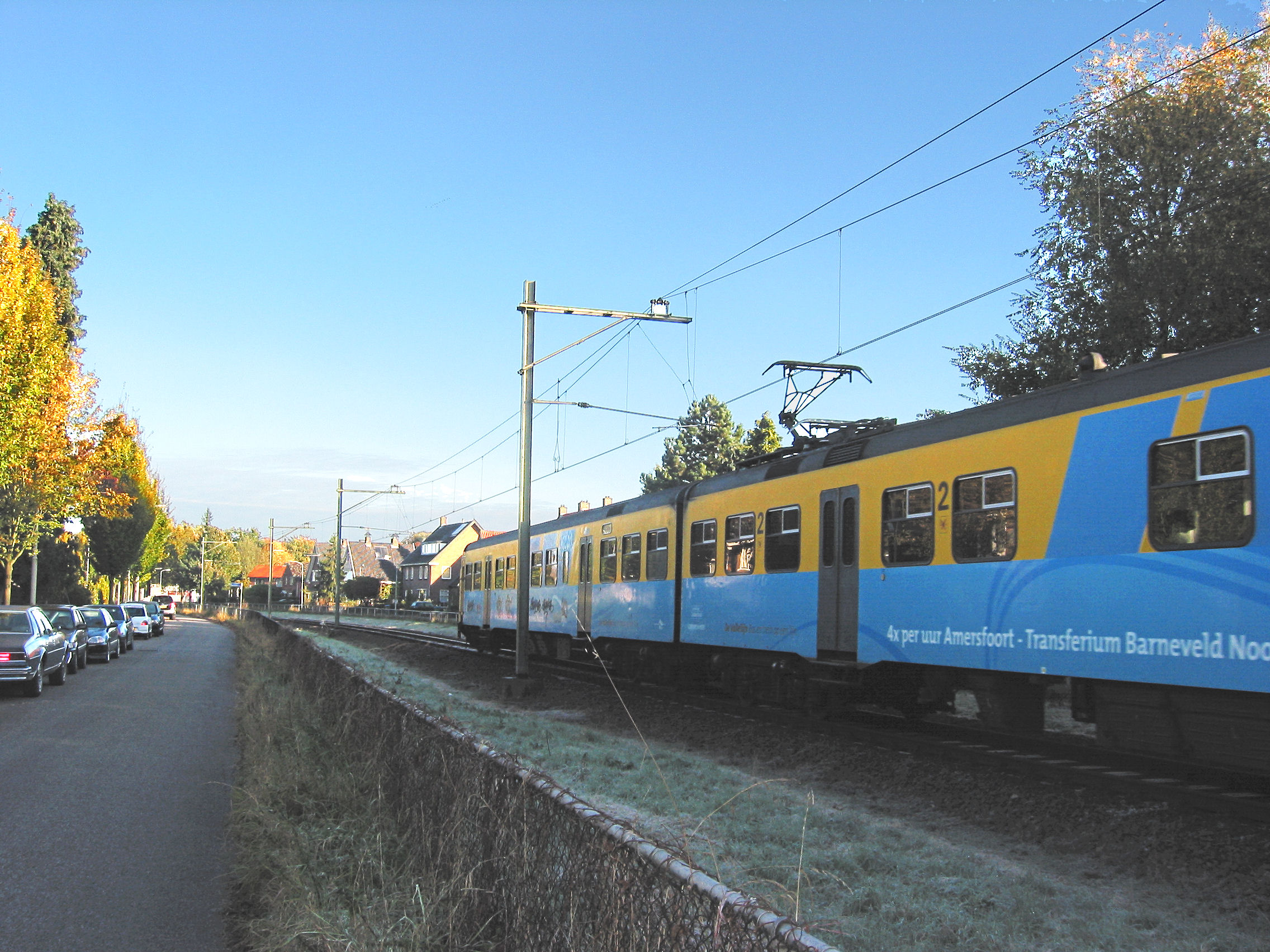
A hired Mat '64 unit in Ede, before the service changing to Protos units

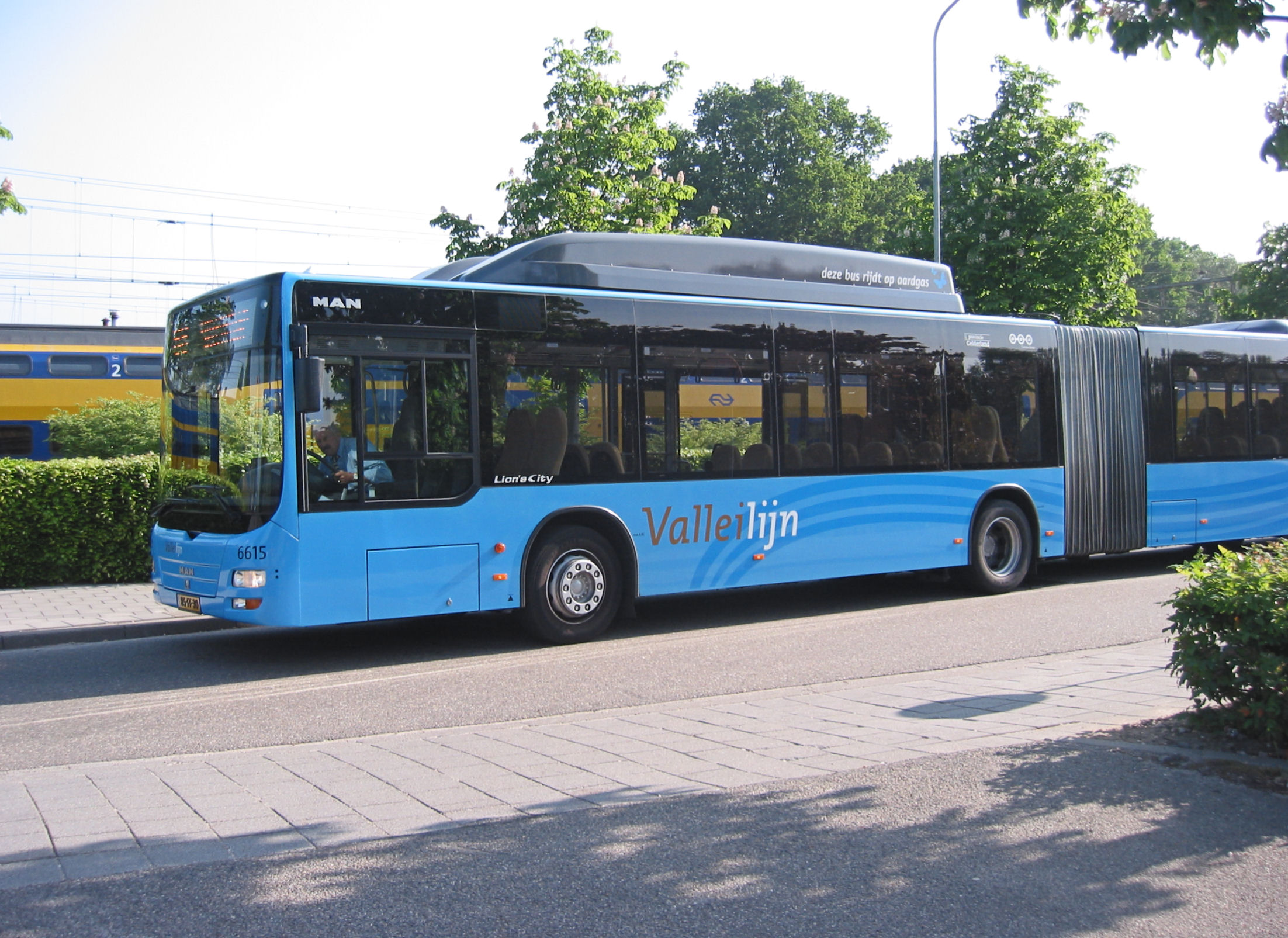
The 88 Bus at Ede-Wageningen

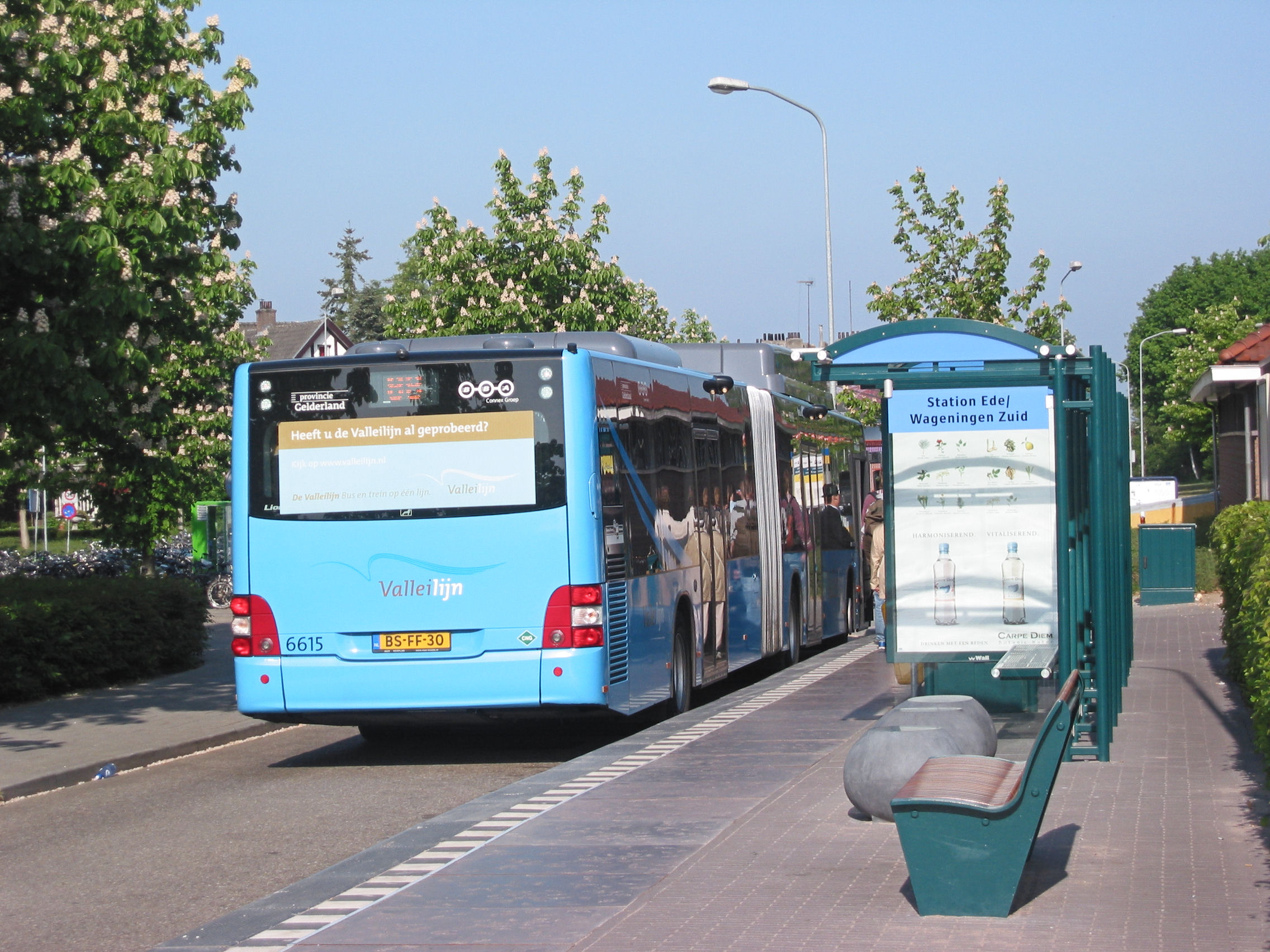
New bus stops were also put in along the 88 route
