= Barneveld Zuid railway station =

Railway station in the Netherlands

Barneveld Zuid
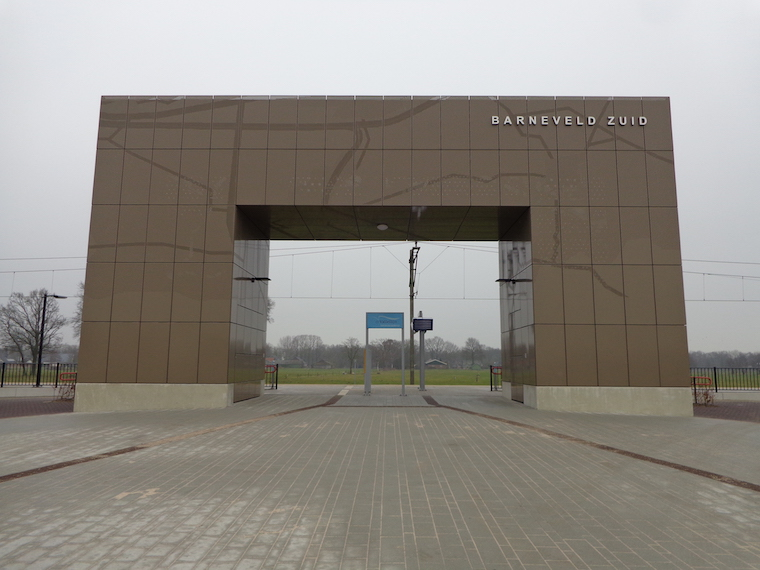

General information
- Location: Netherlands
- Coordinates: 52°07′46″N 5°36′07″E
- Line: Nijkerk–Ede-Wageningen railway
- Platforms: 1

Other information
- Station code: Bnz

History
- Opened: 2 February 2015; 11 years ago

Services
Preceding station	Valleilijn	Following station
Barneveld Centrum towards Amersfoort	Stoptrein 31300	Lunteren towards Ede-Wageningen
Barneveld Centrum towards Amersfoort	Stoptrein 31400	Terminus
Location
- Location within Netherlands

Barneveld Zuid (English: Barneveld South) is a railway station in the south of Barneveld, Netherlands. The station opened on 2 February 2015 and is located on the Nijkerk–Ede-Wageningen railway, also known as the Valleilijn. The train services are operated by Connexxion.

== Train services ==
As of 11 December 2016, the following local train services call at this station:

- Stoptrein: Amersfoort - Barneveld - Ede-Wageningen
- Stoptrein: Amersfoort - Barneveld
