= Amersfoort Centraal railway station =

Railway station in Amersfoort, Netherlands

Amersfoort Centraal
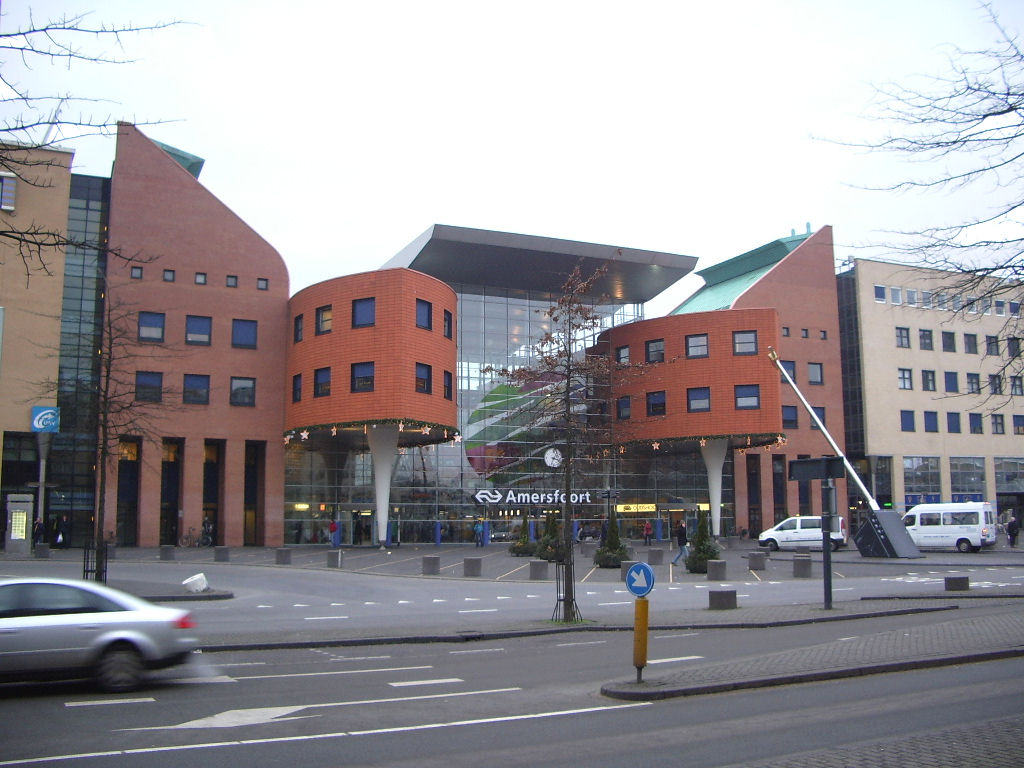

General information
- Location: Stationsplein 41, 3818LE Amersfoort; Utrecht; The Netherlands
- Coordinates: 52°9′14″N 5°22′27″E
- Owner: NS Stations
- Operator: NS Stations
- Lines: Utrecht–Kampen railway; Amsterdam–Zutphen railway; Kesteren–Amersfoort railway; Nijkerk–Ede-Wageningen railway
- Tracks: 6
- Train operators: Nederlandse Spoorwegen; NS International; Connexxion
- Bus operators: Syntus; U-OV
- Connections: Syntus: 1, 2, 3, 4, 5, 6, 8, 19, 56, 70, 74, 76, 77, 78, 80, 82, 83, 102, 103, 252, 656; U-OV: 52, 252, 452

Other information
- Station code: Amf

History
- Opened: 1 August 1901
- Rebuilt: 1997
- Electrified: 1946
- Former names: Amersfoort (–2019)

Passengers
- 2018: 43,710 per day
Services
Preceding station	DB Fernverkehr	Following station
Hilversum towards Amsterdam Centraal	ICE 77	Apeldoorn towards Berlin Ostbahnhof
Preceding station	ÖBB	Following station
Amsterdam Centraal Terminus	Nightjet	Deventer towards Innsbruck Hbf or Wien Hbf
Preceding station	Nederlandse Spoorwegen	Following station
Utrecht Centraal towards Den Haag Centraal	NS Intercity 500	Zwolle towards Groningen
Utrecht Centraal towards Den Haag Centraal	NS Intercity 600	Zwolle towards Leeuwarden
Hilversum towards Amsterdam Centraal	NS Intercity 1500	Apeldoorn towards Deventer
Utrecht Centraal towards Den Haag Centraal	NS Intercity 1700 Until 20:00	Apeldoorn towards Enschede
Utrecht Centraal towards Rotterdam Centraal	NS Intercity 1700 After 20:00	Apeldoorn towards Enschede
Hilversum towards Breda	NS Intercity Direct 1800	Amersfoort Schothorst Terminus
Utrecht Centraal Terminus	NS Nachtnet 21440 Fri/Sat night only	Terminus
Den Dolder towards Utrecht Centraal	NS Sprinter 5600	Amersfoort Schothorst towards Zwolle
Baarn towards Amsterdam Centraal	NS Sprinter 5800	Amersfoort Schothorst towards Amersfoort Vathorst
Preceding station	Valleilijn	Following station
Terminus	Stoptrein 31300	Hoevelaken towards Ede-Wageningen
Terminus	Stoptrein 31400	Hoevelaken towards Barneveld Zuid
Preceding station	European Sleeper	Following station
Amsterdam Centraal towards Brussels-South	Brussels–Prague	Deventer towards Prague
Location
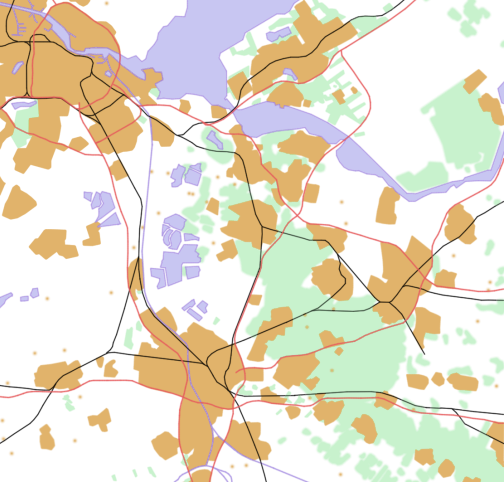
- Location within Northeastern Randstad

Amersfoort Centraal is the main railway station in Amersfoort in the province of Utrecht, Netherlands. The station was an important link between the western part of the Netherlands and the north and east of the country until December 2012 when the Hanzelijn opened.

== History ==
The original station building opened on 20 August 1863, and closed in 1904. It was called Amersfoort NCS and is located next to the railway tracks 200 metres (656 ft) east of the end of the platforms of the current station. This first station opened as part of the Utrecht–Kampen railway ("Centraalspoorweg"), which runs from Utrecht via Amersfoort to Zwolle and Kampen.

In 1874 the Gooilijn opened, running from Amsterdam via Hilversum to Amersfoort. Two years later the line was extended to form the Oosterspoorweg ("East rail line") from Amersfoort to Apeldoorn and Zutphen. In 1886 a railway line opened from Amersfoort to Kesteren, offering a direct service between Amsterdam and Nijmegen. However, the 1863 station was just too far east for the line, and so another station was built on the Kesteren line, called Amersfoort Stad. Parts of the Kesteren line still exist today. To permit connections between the two stations, a third station was built, called Amersfoort Aansluiting (“Amersfoort Connection”). Because this meant there were three stations all close to each other, it was decided to consolidate them and the current station was built and opened in 1901. It was renovated in 1997, at which time a third island-platform, as well as an exit on the north side of the station, were built.

Since 1970, Amersfoort has been important for intercity passengers, as it was the only station where all cross country intercity trains from Amsterdam, The Hague and Rotterdam to Leeuwarden, Groningen and Enschede met. Passengers only need to cross to the other side of an island platform to change for trains to other destinations. Since December 2012 and the opening of the Hanzelijn, trains from The Hague and Amsterdam now travel via Lelystad to Zwolle, avoiding Amersfoort.

A second station was opened in Amersfoort in 1987, called Amersfoort Schothorst, and in 2006 a third was opened, Amersfoort Vathorst. Both these stations are on the Amersfoort – Zwolle line.

The Centraalspoorweg between Amersfoort and Zwolle is also known as the Veluwelijn.

A new fly-under was opened on 18 October 2013, after two years of construction, to allow trains from Hilversum to access Platform 1 without crossing the other lines. The cost was €44.5 million.

== Train services ==
As of 11 December 2016, the following train services call at this station:

- Express services:
  - International Intercity: Amsterdam - Amersfoort - Hengelo - Osnabrück - Hanover - Berlin
  - Intercity: Schiphol - Hilversum - Amersfoort - Hengelo - Enschede
  - Intercity: Schiphol - Hilversum - Amersfoort - Amersfoort Schothorst
  - Intercity: Amsterdam - Hilversum - Amersfoort (- Deventer)
  - Intercity: Rotterdam - Utrecht - Amersfoort - Zwolle - Groningen
  - Intercity: Rotterdam - Utrecht - Amersfoort - Zwolle - Leeuwarden
  - Intercity: The Hague - Utrecht - Amersfoort - Hengelo - Enschede
  - Intercity: The Hague - Utrecht - Amersfoort - Amersfoort Schothorst
  - International European Sleeper service: Brussels - Amsterdam - Berlin - Prague
- Local services:
  - Sprinter: Utrecht - Amersfoort - Zwolle
  - Sprinter: Hoofddorp - Amsterdam - Hilversum - Amersfoort Vathorst
  - Stoptrein: Amersfoort - Barneveld - Ede-Wageningen
  - Stoptrein: Amersfoort - Barneveld Zuid

In March 2026 GoVolta services began calling.

== Bus services ==
Bus services depart from the bus station at the front of the station; services are operated by Syntus and U-OV (52, 72).

- 1: Park Bilthoven - Soesterkwartier/Isselt - Station
- 2: Station - Nieuwland
- 3: Station - Vathorst
- 4: Station - Hoogland - Kattenbroek
- 5: Station - City Centre - Schothorst - Vathorst
- 6: Station - City Centre - Rustenburg - Liendert
- 7: Station - Schothorst - Vathorst
- 8: Station - City Centre - Vermeerkwartier - Schullenburg
- 9 Station - Leusderkwartier - Eemgaarde
- 17: Amersfoort - Leusden
- 19: Station - Rusthof Cemetery
- 52: Amersfoort - Soesterberg - Huis ter Heide - Zeist North - De Built - Utrecht
- 56: Amersfoort - Soesterberg - Huis ter Heide - Zeist - Driebergen-Zeist - Doorn - Wijk bij Duurstede
- 70: Amersfoort - Soest Zuid - Soestdijk North - Hilversum
- 72: Amersfoort - Soesterberg - Zeist - Utrecht
- 76: Amersfoort - Bunschoten - Spakenburg
- (X)80: Amersfoort - Leusden South - Woudenberg - Scherpenzeel - Veenendaal - Rhenen
- 82: Amersfoort - Leusden South - Woudenberg - Maarn - Doorn
- 102: Amersfoort - Hoevelaken - Zwartebroek - Terschuur - Voorthuizen - Nieuw Millingen - Apeldoorn
- 217: Amersfoort - Leusden
- 280: Amersfoort - Leusden South - Woudenberg - Maarsbergen - Veenendaal
- 356: Amersfoort - Soesterberg, National Military Museum
