= Ede-Wageningen railway station =

Railway station in the Netherlands

Ede-Wageningen
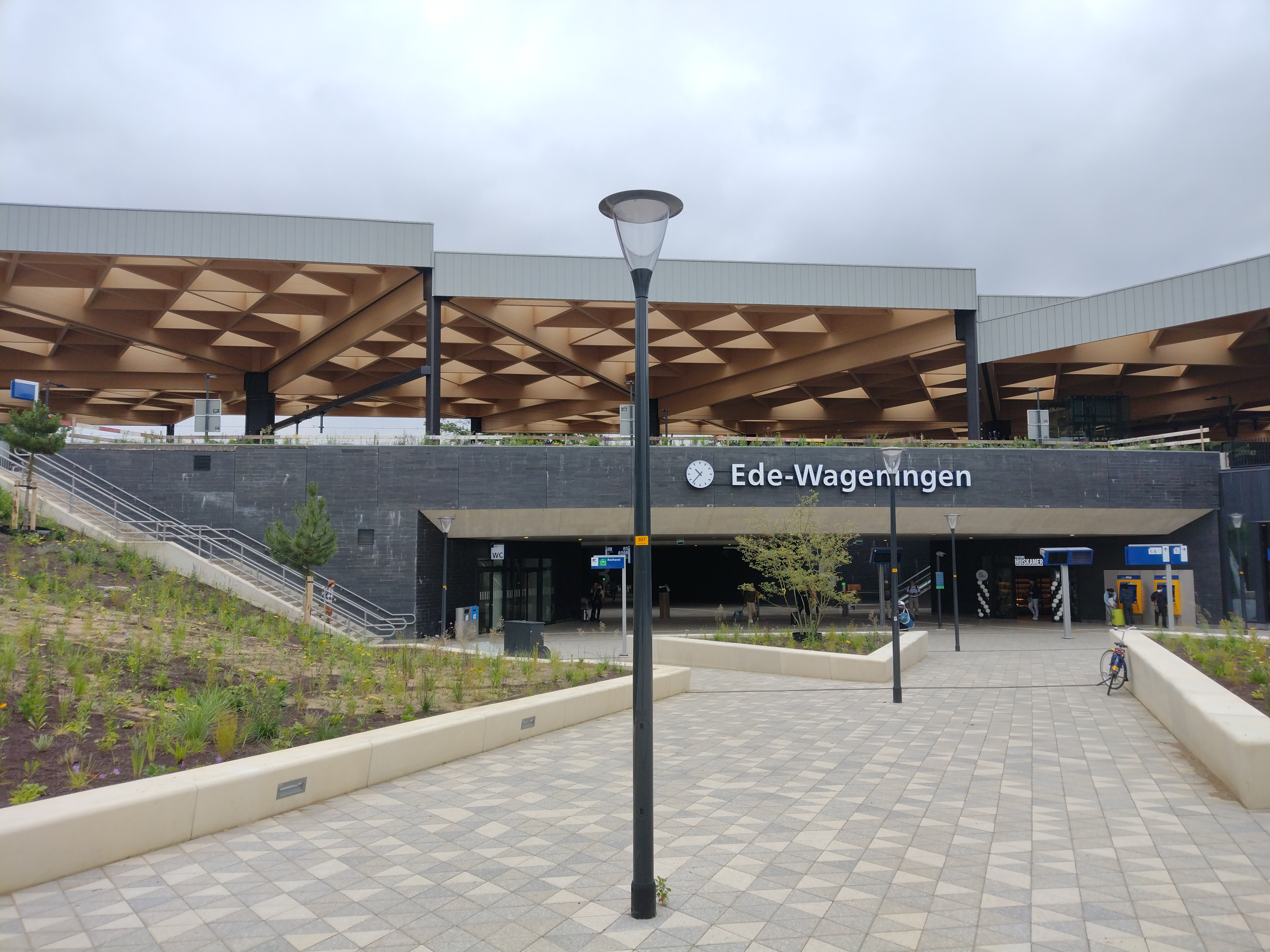

General information
- Location: Netherlands
- Coordinates: 52°01′40″N 5°40′19″E
- Lines: Amsterdam–Arnhem railway Nijkerk–Ede-Wageningen railway

History
- Opened: 1845

Services
Preceding station	Nederlandse Spoorwegen	Following station
Driebergen-Zeist towards Den Helder	NS Intercity 3000 Before 19:00	Arnhem Centraal towards Nijmegen
Veenendaal-De Klomp towards Den Helder	NS Intercity 3000 After 19:00	Arnhem Centraal towards Nijmegen
Utrecht Centraal towards Den Haag Centraal	NS Intercity 3100 Mon-Thurs before 19:00	Arnhem Centraal towards Nijmegen
Veenendaal-De Klomp towards Den Haag Centraal	NS Intercity 3100 After 19:00 and Fri-Sun	Arnhem Centraal towards Nijmegen
Veenendaal-De Klomp towards Rotterdam Centraal	NS Intercity 3200 Mon-Thurs before 19:00	Arnhem Centraal Terminus
Veenendaal-De Klomp towards Utrecht Centraal	NS Nachtnet 21430 Fri/Sat night only	Arnhem Centraal towards Nijmegen
Terminus	NS Sprinter 7500	Wolfheze towards Arnhem Centraal
Preceding station	Valleilijn	Following station
Ede Centrum towards Amersfoort	Stoptrein 31300	Terminus
Location
- Location within Netherlands

Ede-Wageningen is a railway station located in Ede, Netherlands. It is situated on the Amsterdam–Arnhem railway and the Nijkerk–Ede-Wageningen railway. The station is the main Intercity station, but is not in the centre of the town. The station also serves Wageningen, a city 8 km to the south of Ede.

== History ==
The station opened on 16 May 1845 on the Amsterdam–Arnhem railway as the Ede-Rhijnspoor station. The railway was originally planned to run via Wageningen instead of Ede, but this did not go ahead. Until 1937 there was a tram service from Ede to Wageningen, but this was replaced at that time by a bus service. This is when the station changed to Ede-Wageningen.

In 2022 major construction started on completely replacing the outdated building with a much more modern, useful and friendly train station. The new station was opened early 2024, with minor finishing works ongoing and the area around the station still being built.

== Train services ==
As of 11 December 2016, the following local train services call at this station:

- Express services:
  - Intercity: Den Helder - Amsterdam - Utrecht - Nijmegen
  - Intercity: Schiphol - Utrecht - Nijmegen
- Local services
  - Sprinter: Ede-Wageningen - Arnhem
  - Stoptrein: Amersfoort - Ede-Wageningen

== Bus services ==
The bus station is located on the south side of the station. Buses depart from here in various directions. Main operator is Transdev under RRReis branding.

Bus service of Ede Wageningen
	Route	Operator	Notes
1	Ede: Oost - Station - Hospital - Veldhuizen	RRReis (Transdev)	City bus
2	Ede: Veldhuizen - Centrum - Station - Maandereng - Hospital	RRReis (Transdev)	City bus
3	De Klomp - Ede: Kievitsmeent - Kernhem - Centrum - Station - Bennekom - Wageningen: Bovenbuurt - Bus station	RRReis (Transdev)	City bus
4	Ede: Station - Hospital - Frankeneng - Veenendaal: Dragonder - Station Centrum	RRReis (Transdev) / U-OV (Keolis)	City bus. The route is served jointly by Transdev and Keolis
103	Ede - Wageningen - Renkum - Heelsum - Doorwerth - Heveadorp - Oosterbeek - Arnhem Centraal Station	RRReis (Transdev)	Regional bus
106	(Ede -) Otterlo - De Hoge Veluwe	RRReis (Transdev)	Regional bus. Comes to the station only in the summer
108	Apeldoorn - Hoenderloo - Otterlo - Ede	RRReis (Transdev)	Regional bus
303	Ede - Wageningen - Renkum - Heelsum - Doorwerth - Oosterbeek - Arnhem Centraal Station - Arnhem Paasberg - Velp	RRReis (Transdev)	Regional bus. This bus is a ComfortRRReis service, which means it's an express bus
403	Ede: Station - Wageningen: WUR	RRReis (Transdev)	Express bus between Station and Wageningen University. Runs only during peak hours on weekdays. Does not run in summer vacations.
607	Ede - Wekerom - Harskamp - Kootwijkerbroek - Amersfoort Hoornbeeck/Van Lodenstein	RRReis (Transdev)	Only one run on weekday mornings
651	Ede - Wekerom - Harskamp - (Stroe ← Wittenberg ←) Nieuw-Milligen - Hoog Soeren - Apeldoorn Jacobus Fruytierschool	RRReis (EBS)	Only one run on weekday mornings
808	Ede Centrum → Ede Station → Bennekom → Wageningen	RRReis (Transdev)	Only two runs during Saturday late nights. A special tariff applies.
809	Ede Station → Ede Centrum → Lunteren → Barneveld	RRReis (Transdev)	Only one run during Saturday late nights. A special tariff applies.
