= Connexxion =

Dutch public transport company

- Company type: Naamloze vennootschap
- Industry: Public Transport, Taxi Service
- Founded: 10 May 1999
- Headquarters: Hilversum, Netherlands
- Key people: Pier Eringa (CEO)
- Products: Bus Transport; Rail Transport; Ferry Service; Taxi Service
- Number of employees: 9,800 (2015)
- Parent: Transdev (86%); Bank Nederlandse Gemeenten (14%)
- Website: www.connexxion.nl

Connexxion formerly Transdev Netherlands, Veolia Transport Nederlands and Connex Netherlands is a large public transport company in the Netherlands, operating in the west, middle, east, and southwest parts of the country. It is owned by Transdev and Bank Nederlandse Gemeenten. It is a subsidiary of Transdev Netherlands.

== History ==
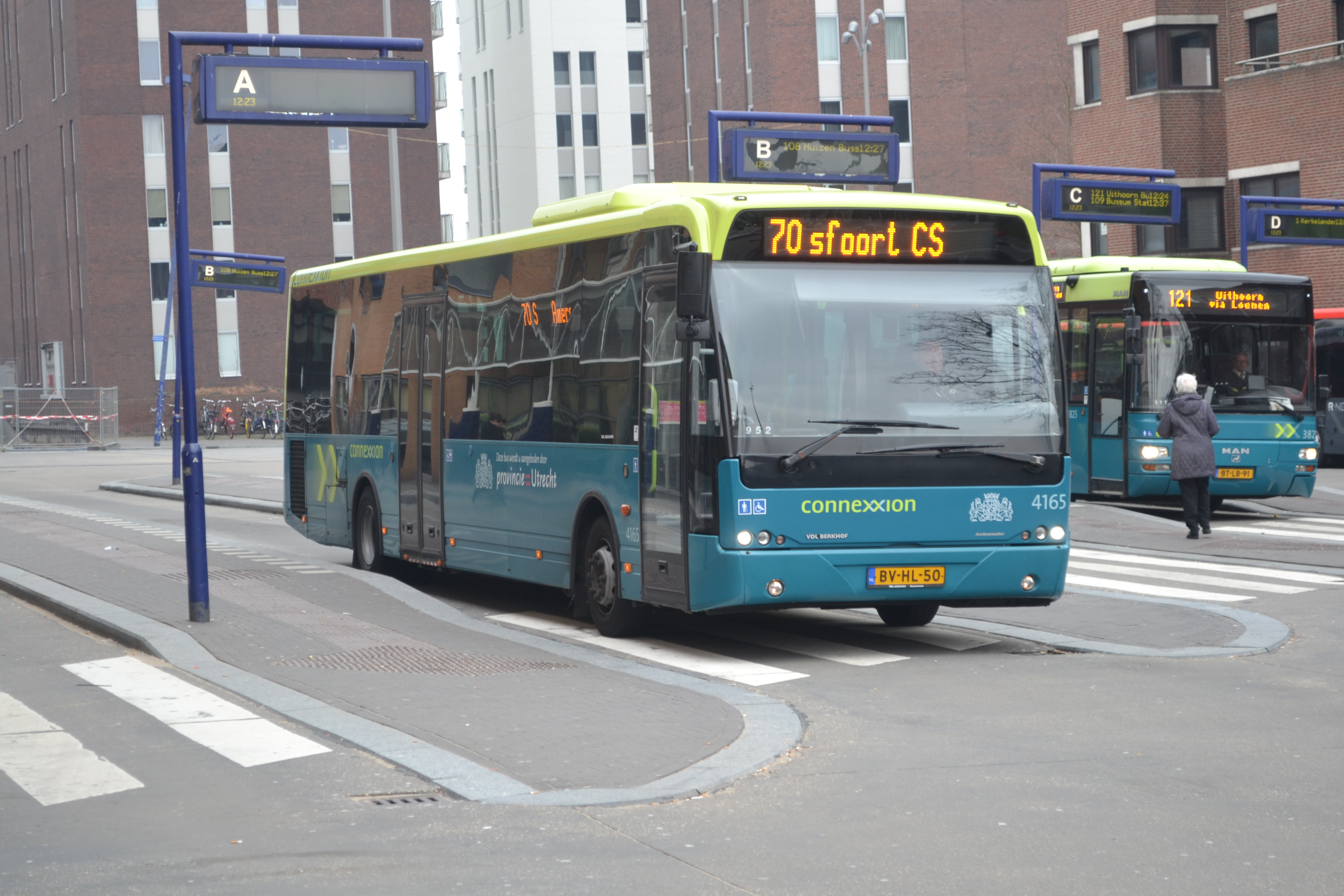
VDL Berkhof at Hilversum station in March 2013

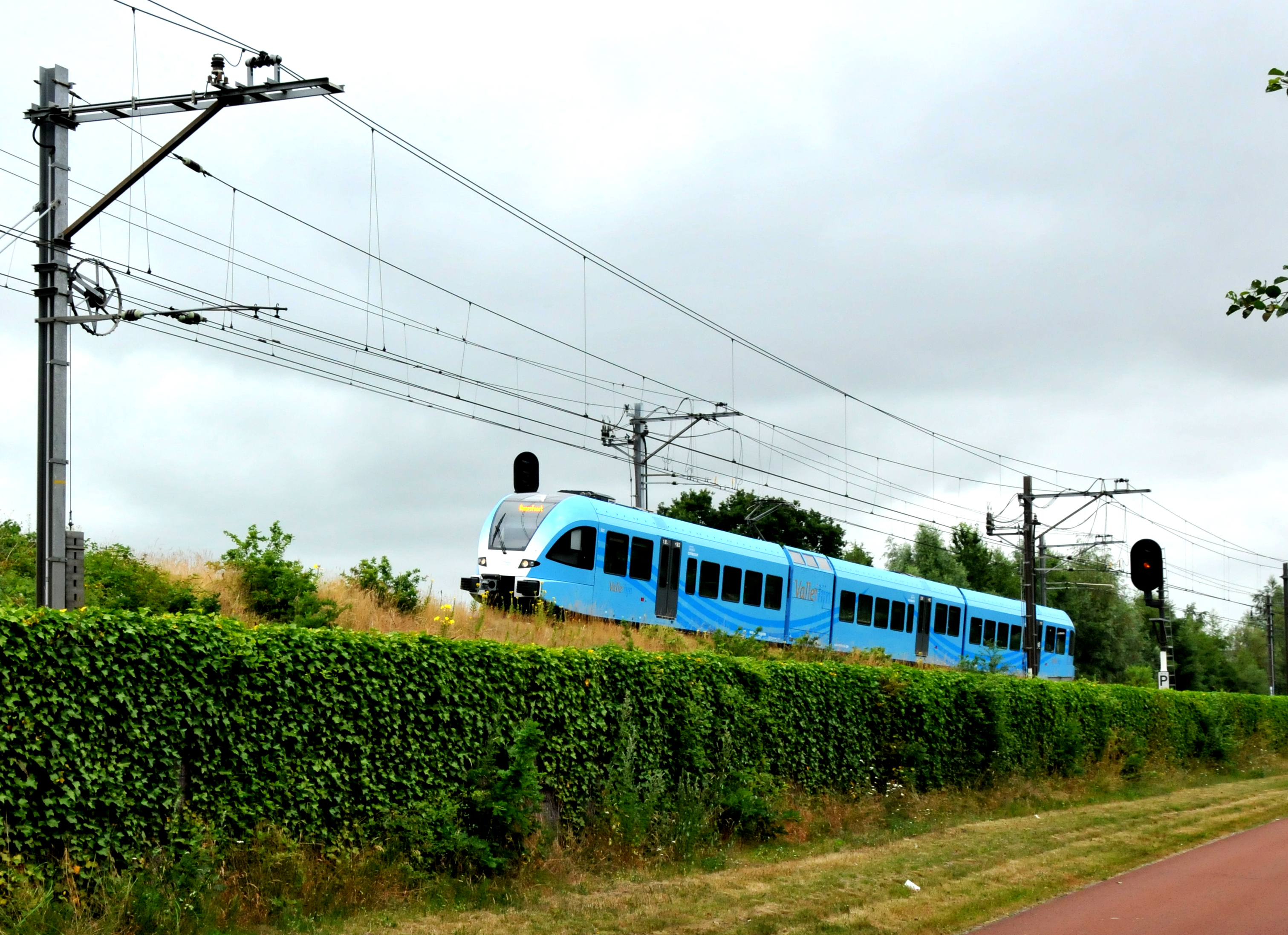
GTW train near Amersfoort in July 2013

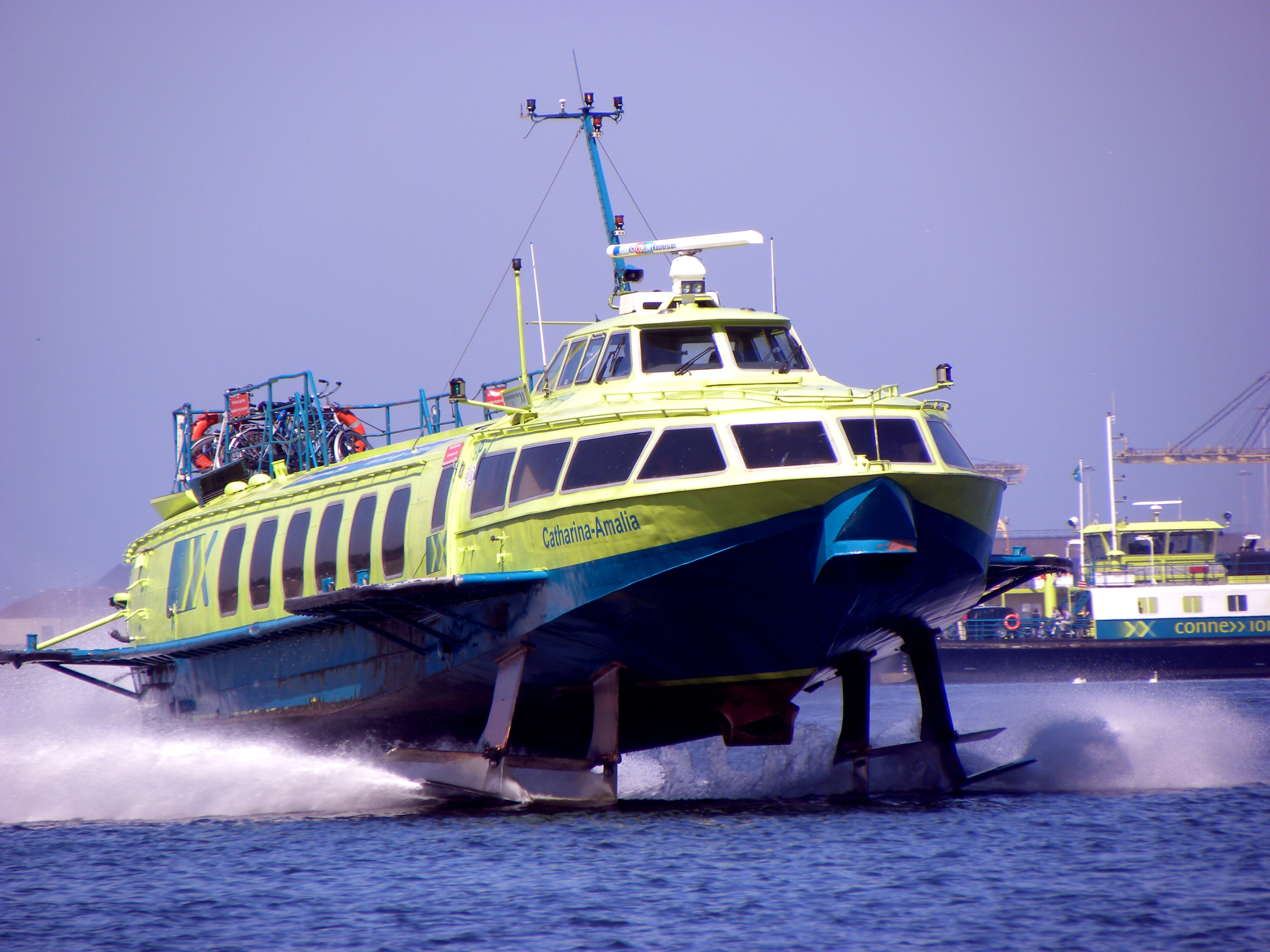
Voskhod hydrofoil in June 2009

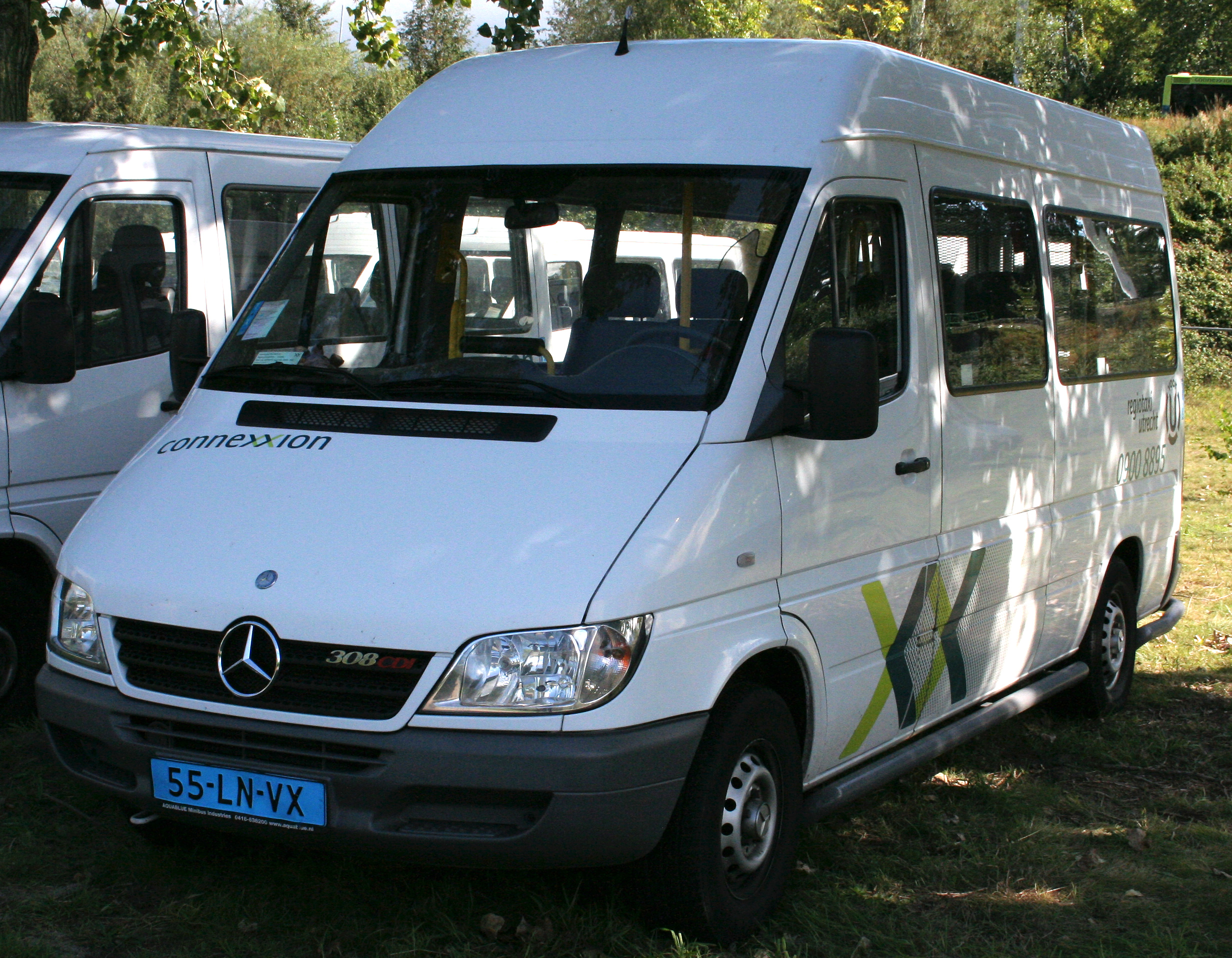
Mercedes-Benz Sprinter taxi in September 2007

Connexxion was formed on 10 May 1999 from a merger between transport companies NZH, ZWN, Midnet and Oostnet. Its name is a mutation of the French word connexion meaning connection. In January 2007, Connexxion took over Utrecht public transport operator GVU and Nijmegen operator Novio. In 2007, Connexxion's 33% shareholding in Syntus was sold.

On 12 October 2007, Connexxion was privatised with a 67% stake purchased by Transdev-BNG-Connexxion Holding BV (TBCH), a consortium consisting of Transdev (75%) and Bank Nederlandse Gemeenten (BNG) (25%), beating a Deutsche Bahn / Rabobank consortium and FirstGroup. This gives Transdev 50%, BNG 17%, and the government a 33% stake in Connexxion. In February 2013, the government's 33% shareholding was purchased by Transdev, increasing its shareholding to 86%.

Connexxion's parent company, Transdev Netherlands, also had another operation called Veolia Transport Nederland. The branding was replaced with the Connexxion in December 2016. As a result, Veolia Transport Nederland's Haaglanden operations were rebranded to Connexxion.

== Operations ==
=== Operating area ===
Connexxion operate in Amstelland, Amsterdam-Zuidoost, Arnhem, Gooi, Haarlem, Hoeksche Waard, IJsselmonde, North Holland, Vechtstreek, Zaanstreek and Zeeland.

=== Buses ===
As of January 2016, Connexxion operated 1,900 buses and coaches. It operates the only trolleybus network in the Netherlands and, in 2017, introduced double-deckers on one route. Connexxion also owns bus companies Hermes and Novio.

In December 2013, Connexxion commenced operating the IJsselmonde, Rotterdam concession for 10 years. In December 2017, Connexxion will begin operating the Amstelland-Meerlanden concession for 10 years. An order has been placed with VDL for 100 Citeas SLFA electric buses. This will make it the largest operator of electric buses in Europe.

=== Rail ===
Connexxion is contracted to operate the Arnhem to Doetinchem concession until December 2020 and the Vallei line concession until December 2021.

Connexxion held the Almelo to Mariënberg concession from December 2006 until December 2013 however its operation was sub-contracted to Syntus. It operated the Sneltram between Utrecht and Nieuwegein until December 2013.

The fleet comprises five 2-car Protos electric multiple units, nine 3-car Stadler GTWs diesel multiple units, and two 3-car Stadler Flirts.

=== Ferries ===
Connexxion operated a ferry route from Velsen to IJmuiden and Amsterdam Centraal station with Voskhod hydrofoils until 31 December 2013.

=== Taxis ===
As of March 2015 Connexxion operated 3,500 taxis.
