= Timmer =

Timmer is a Dutch occupational surname, meaning "carpenter". People with surname include:

- Albert Timmer (born 1985), Dutch road racing cyclist
- Albertus Odoricus Timmer (1859–1943), Dutch Catholic missionary prelate and bishop of the Roman Catholic Diocese of Lu'an
- Ann Timmer (born 1960), American chief justice of the Arizona Supreme Court
- Damien Timmer (born 1968), English business executive
- Hendrik Timmer (1904–1998), Dutch tennis player
- Hendrika Timmer (1926–1994), Dutch chess master
- Henk Timmer (born 1971), Dutch football goalkeeper
- Henry Timmer (born 1981), Dutch football goalkeeper
- Henry W. Timmer (1873–1963), American politician
- Jan Timmer (born 1933), Dutch business executive, CEO of Philips 1990–1996
- Jens Timmer (born 1964), German physician and systems biologist
- John Timmer (1931–2018), American politician
- Kees Timmer (1903–1978), Dutch sculptor and painter
- Maria Timmer (born 1987), American meteorologist, wife of Reed Timmer
- Marianne Timmer (born 1974), Dutch speed skater
- Mirjam Timmer (born 1982), Dutch singer-songwriter
- Netti Witziers-Timmer (1923–2005), née Timmer, Dutch athlete
- Reed Timmer (born 1980), American meteorologist
- Theo Timmer (born 1949), Dutch motorcycle road racer
