= Ron Mandos =

Dutch art promoter

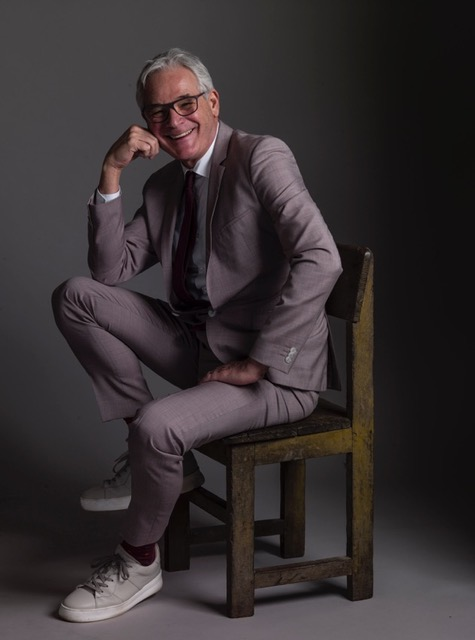
- Portrait of Ron Mandos by Koos Breukel
- Occupation: Art dealer

Ron Mandos is a Dutch art promoter. He also founded Galerie Ron Mandos.

Based in Amsterdam, Galerie Ron Mandos represents artists such as Hans Op de Beeck, Isaac Julien, Anthony Goicolea, Daniel Arsham, Mohau Modisakeng, Troika, Jacco Olivier, Levi van Veluw, Remy Jungerman and Erwin Olaf. The gallery scouts Dutch art academies, in search of new talent.

== Biography ==
He owned several flower shops in the city centre, and in 1995, Mandos decided to sell his flower shops to travel around the world. During a stay in Madrid, he visited the Museo Nacional Centro de Arte Reina Sofía, where he re-discovered his passion for the art. After experiencing Stendhal Syndrome in front of Pablo Picasso’s Guernica, he decided to pursue a career in the arts.

== Galerie Ron Mandos ==
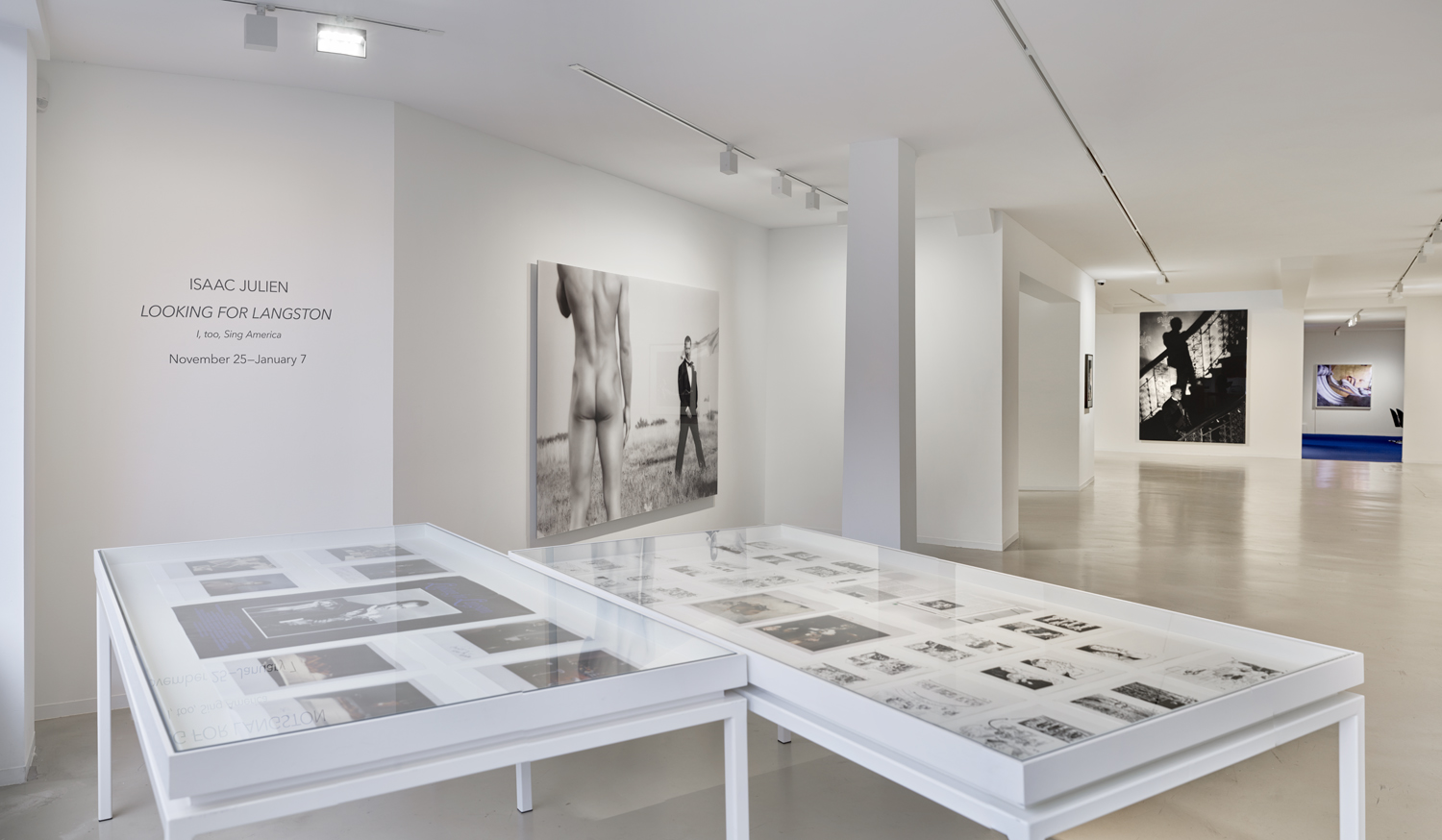
Installation view of Looking For Langston by Isaac Julien, 2016

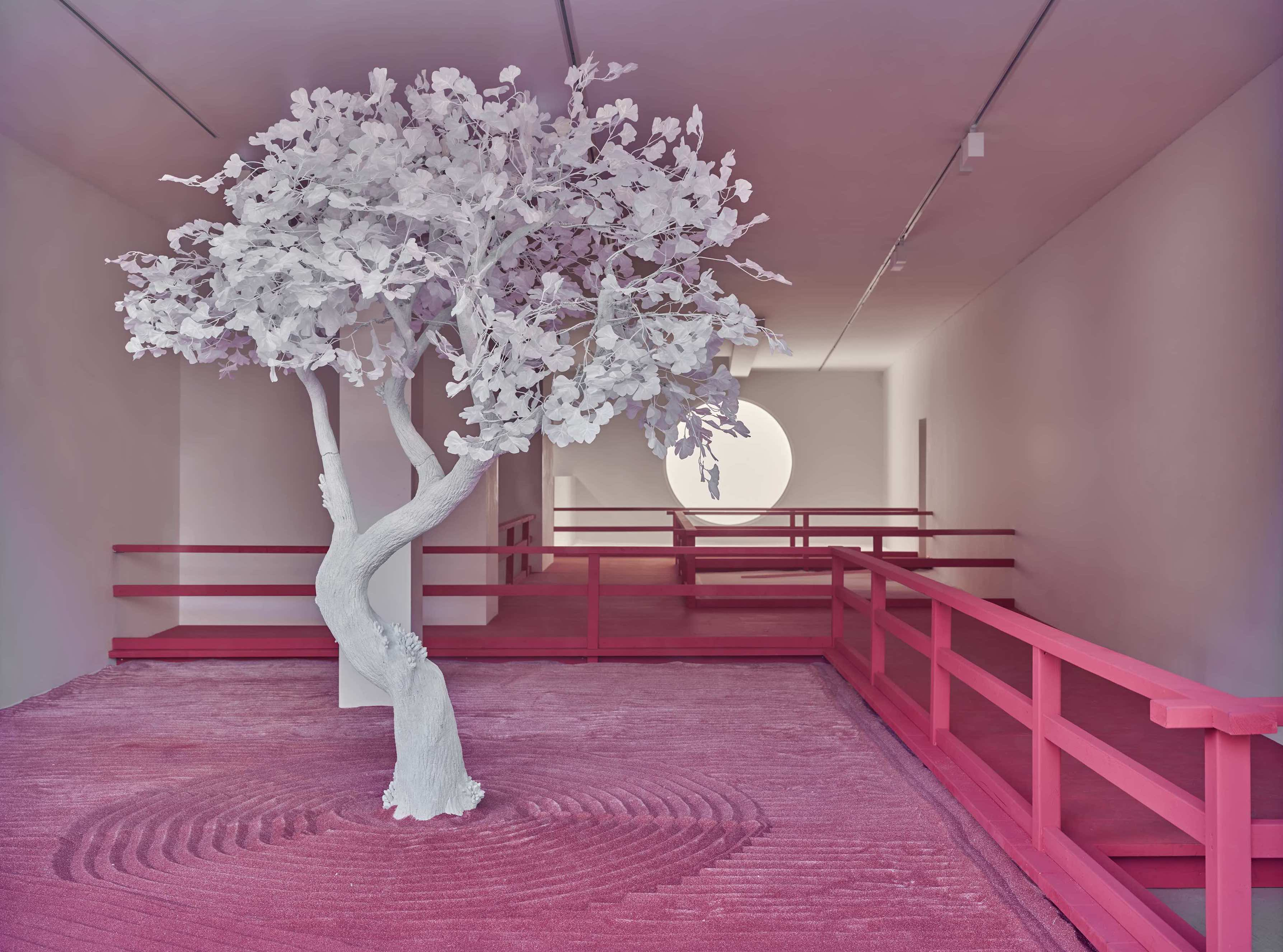
Installation view of Lunar Garden by Daniel Arsham, 2019

In 1998, Mandos opened an art gallery adjacent to his house, inspired by Jan Hoet’s Chambres d’Amis. He staged exhibitions with artists including Ine Lamers, Katinka Lampe en Joep van Lieshout. The gallery soon expanded to represent international artists and has participated in art fairs such as Art Forum Berlin, Art Brussels, The Armory Show, ARCO Madrid, LOOP Barcelona, FIAC Paris and UNTITLED ART, Miami Beach.

In 2006, Galerie Ron Mandos relocated to Amsterdam to organise more large-scale exhibitions. Around this time, the gallery started to represent artists like Isaac Julien and Hans Op de Beeck. Since 2008, the gallery annually programs Best of Graduates, an exhibition showing a selection of works by recent graduates of Dutch art academies. In 2016, Galerie Ron Mandos was shortlisted for an International Association of Art Critics award.

== Ron Mandos Young Blood Foundation ==
In 2018, Mandos founded the Ron Mandos Young Blood Foundation. It invites people to enter the annual Best of Graduates exhibition and the Ron Mandos Young Blood Talent Award. The Ron Mandos Young Blood Foundation regularly stages exhibitions with work by selected Best of Graduates alumni.
