= Minne =

Minne, a Middle High German word for "loving remembrance", may refer to:

- Courtly love in the German courtly tradition
- Frau Minne, a personification of romantic love in German courtly tradition

== People ==
- Danièle Djamila Amrane-Minne (1939–2017), French-Algerian revolutionary
- George Minne (1866–1941), Belgian artist
- Minne Hoekstra (1884–1941), Dutch speed skater
- Joris Minne (1897–1988), Belgian artist
- Lona Minne, American politician
- Olivier Minne (born 1967), French television presenter and actor
- Stijn Minne (born 1978), Belgian footballer

== See also ==
- Minnesang
- Minnie (disambiguation)
