= Untangling =

Photograph by Jeff Wall

Untangling is a color photograph created by Canadian photographer Jeff Wall, in 1994. It is a staged photograph, like most of his pictures, depicting a scene that takes place in a basement workshop where, in the foreground, a mechanic tries to untagle a large pile of rope. The photograph is a color cibachrome transparency, and is exhibited in a lightbox.

== Description and analysis ==
Wall takes often inspiration from painting and cinema, among other mediums, to create his staged photographs. This one was staged in a studio, where it was recreated what seems to be a typical basement workshop, with two actors impersonating a mechanic and a possible customer. The mechanic is seen seated at the left on a pile of rubber tubing. He wears mechanic attire and is starting patiently the hard work of untangling a very large pile of rope, lying in the ground, in front of him. His concerned expression reflects the large amount of work and time that he still has to do. In the background there are two shelves with dozens of objects, mostly mechanic related, and at the left, a man is seen looking carefully, possibly in search of an item, while apparently unaware of the man's work at the foreground.

Art critic Robert Nelson states concerning the photograph: "The coils sprawl across the foreground in a convulsive corkscrew, recalling the ancient Laocoön sculpture group./ The symbolism of this motif and the air of resignation in the gent who faces the challenge make a potent emblem of the impossible, or the depressing work of recognising it. The photograph translates the labours of Hercules to a thing of the mind, where they make our energy - or lack of it - uncannily transparent."

== Public collections ==
There are copies of this photograph at the National Gallery of Victoria, in Melbourne, and at the Kunstmuseum Wolfsburg. The copy held at the National Gallery of Victoria was allegedly bought by $AU 1,000,000, in 2006, but it was a private sale and its real price is unconfirmed.
