= Twarres =

Dutch folk/pop band

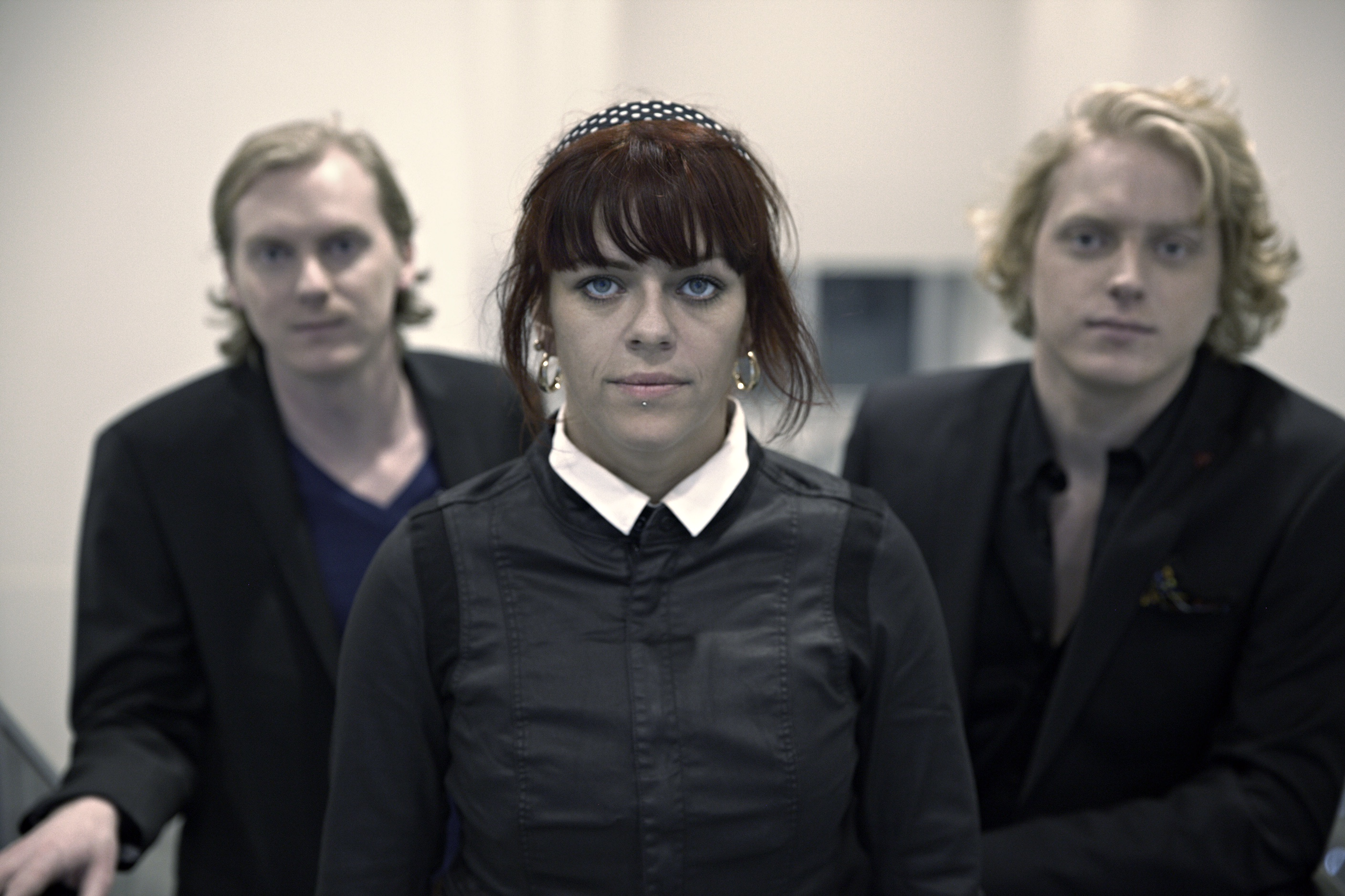
- Twarres in 2015

Background information
- Origin: Wergea, Netherlands
- Genre: Folk
- Years active: 1999–2003, 2009–present
- Members: Mirjam Timmer, Kristian Dijkstra

Twarres is a folk/pop band from Wergea in the Netherlands who perform songs in both English and their native Frisian language. Their songs are primarily lush, harmonic vocal pop with a focus on acoustic instrumentation such as pianos and violins. Their debut single "Wêr bisto" won the audience's award at the 1999 Frisian Song Contest. The band has one platinum certified album and single respectively.

== Band history ==
Mirjam Timmer and Johan van der Veen performed in a talent show under the name Twarres. This led to the duo's success, and in 2000 they scored a hit in the Netherlands and Flanders with the song "Wêr Bisto" recorded in their native West Frisian. They followed this success with the singles "She Couldn't Laugh", "Children," and "I Need To Know." Their debut album, Stream, went platinum.

At the end of 2003 Twarres held their last concert. In August 2006 Twarres announced that a reunion would take place, most probably during 2007 or early 2008. A comeback album by Twarres was scheduled for the early spring of 2008. On 15 August 2007, it was announced that for health reasons Johan van der Veen would leave the band. He was replaced by Auke Busman who also left later. In August/September 2009 Dutch radio station Q-music organised a talent competition to look for "the new Johan". The jury was formed by Mirjam, Johan and some others. On 11 September 2009, the competition was won by Joost Bloemendal.

In 2006, Mirjam Timmer, singer and guitarist of Twarres, also started a solo career under the name "Mir". Her solo album entitled Files from London was released in 2006.

As of 2017, Twarres was a trio comprising Timmer and brothers Julian and Kristian Dijkstra. The 2016 single "Fûgelfrij" was recorded by these band members. In 2017, it was announced though that Julian Dijkstra would leave the band.

== Band members ==
- Mirjam Timmer (born July 1, 1982) – vocals and guitar
- Kristian Dijkstra (born April 26, 1988) – vocals

=== Other band members ===
- Gregor Hamilton – keyboard
- Peter Krako – guitar
- Serge Bredewold – bass
- Sietse Huisman – drums
- Yfke de Jong – violin

== Discography ==
=== Albums ===
Title	Details	Peak chart positions			Certifications
Title	Details	NL	BE (FL)	BE (WA)	Certifications
Wêr Bisto	Released: 1999; Format: Demo CD	—	—	—	
Stream	Released: 2001; Format: Studio album	1	1	8	NL: Platinum
CD^{2}	Released: 2002; Format: Studio album	29	10	25	
"—" denotes an album that did not chart or was not released in that territory.

=== Singles ===
Title	Year	Peak chart positions				Certifications
Title	Year	NL 40	NL 100	BE (FL)	BE (WA)	Certifications
"Wêr Bisto"	2000	1	1	1	6	NL: Platinum
"She Couldn't Laugh"	2001	4	6	4	32	
"Children"	2001	20	18	23	6	
"This Is How It Is"	2001	—	—	—	(67) (Note: "This Is How It Is" did not enter the Ultratop 50, but did enter the Wallonian Ultratip chart.)	
"I Need to Know"	2002	46	51	43	(61) (Note: "I Need to Know" did not enter the Ultratop 50, but did enter the Wallonian Ultratip chart.)	
"Tell Me"	2003	—	—	—	—	
"I'll See You"	2003	44	24	—	—	
"De Juste Snaar"	2011	—	—	—	—	
"Heart of Glass"	2011	—	—	—	—	
"Fugelfrij"	2016	—	—	— (Note: "Fugelfrij" did not enter the Ultratop 50, but did enter the Flemish Ultratip chart.)	—	
"She Won't Let Go"	2016	—	—	—	—	
"Tink Oan My"	2017	—	—	—	—	
"—" denotes a recording that did not chart or was not released in that territory.

== Notes and references ==
Notes
