= Ulrich Hensel =

German visual artist (born 1946)

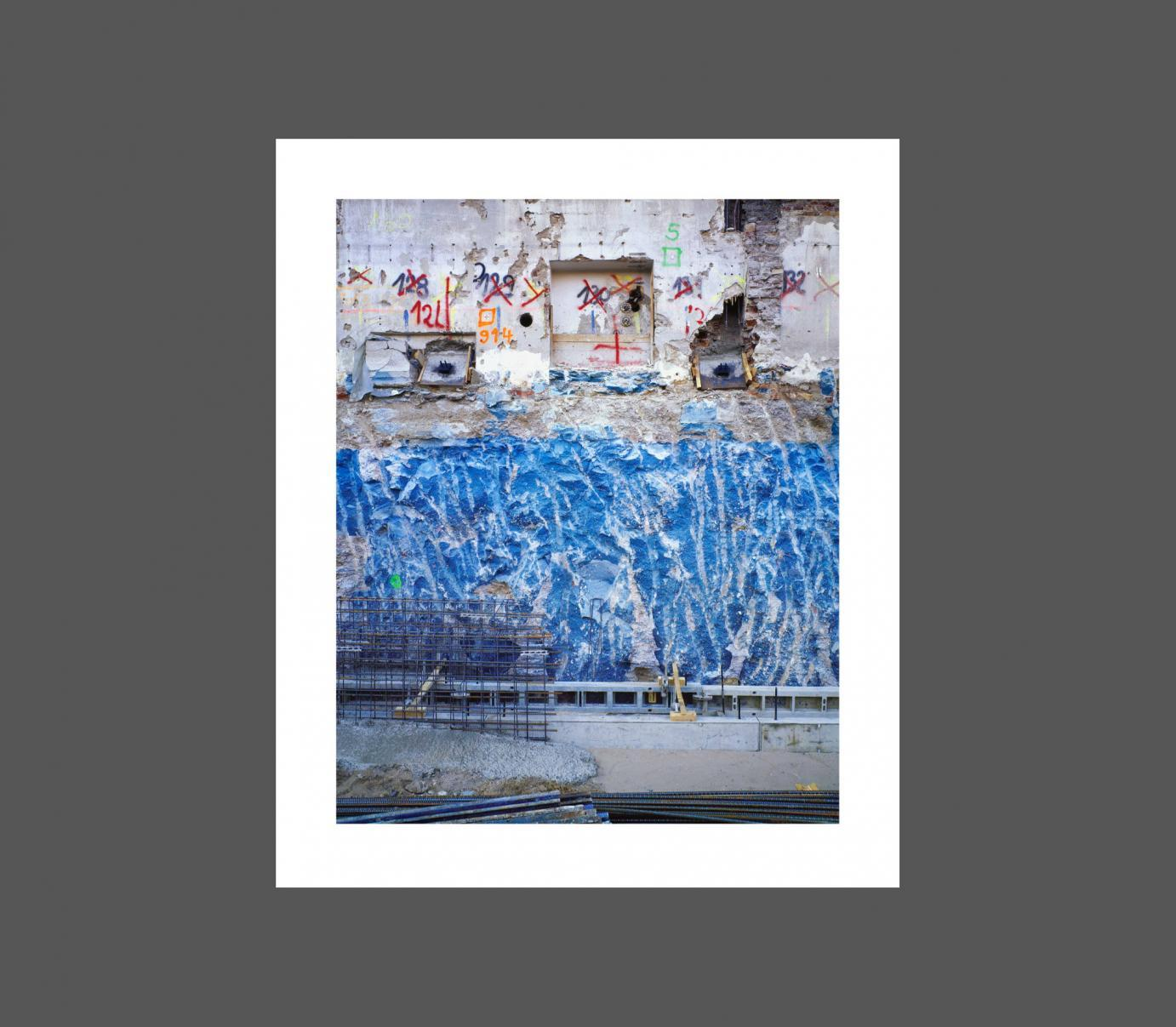
- Ulrich Hensel, Düsseldorf Breite Straße II, C-Print Diasec, 239,7 x 200 cm, 2003
- Born: 1946 (age 79–80); Düsseldorf
- Occupation: Visual artist

Ulrich Hensel (born 1946) is a German visual artist known for his large format colour photographs of construction sites.

== Education ==
He was born in Düsseldorf in 1946 and studied psychology, art and film. Ulrich Hensel did a number of different series of works (e.g. Middle East and North Africa, 1967–1975, India, 1981–1990, local deities in North and in South India, 1995–1997) but since 1991 he has been focusing on images of construction sites.

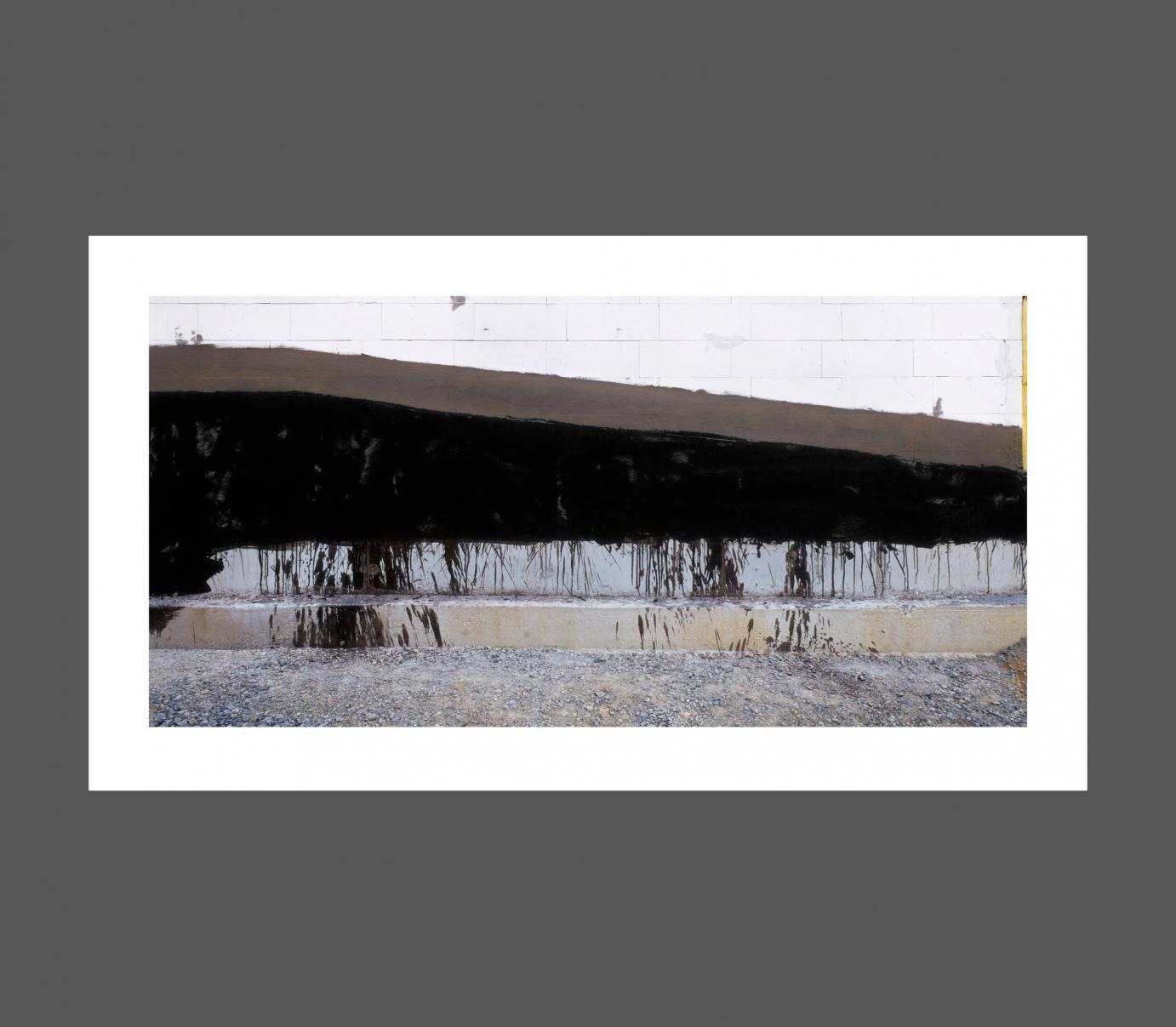
Ulrich Hensel, Düsseldorf, Hans-Vilz-Wg II, C-Print Diasec, 160 cm x 289 cm, 2004

== Career and style ==
Hensel's oeuvre is viewed as occupying a unique place among the photographic art to come out of Germany.

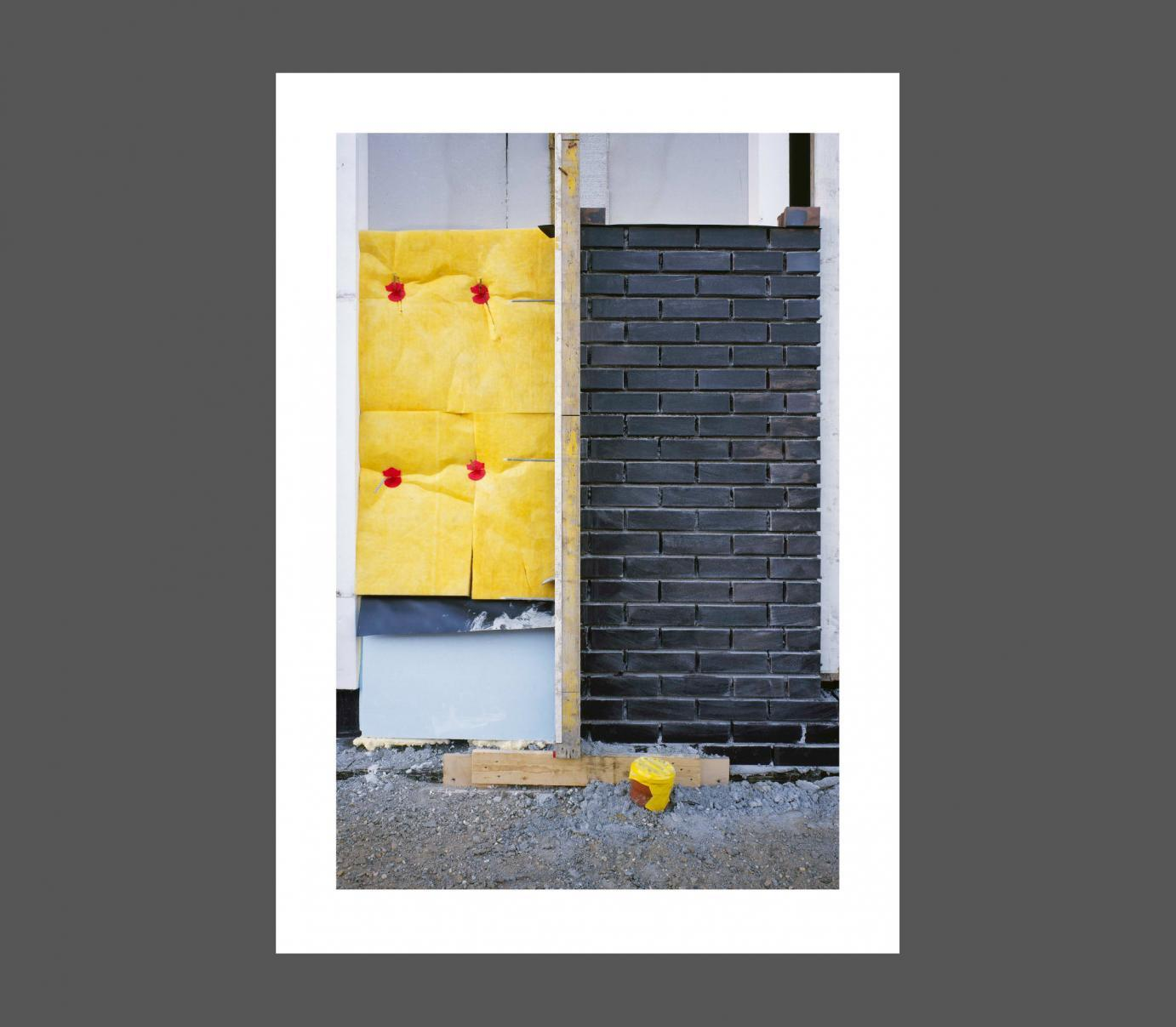
Ulrich Hensel, Düsseldorf, Färberstraße, II, C-Print-Diasec, 254,5 x 180 cm, 2007

For nearly three decades, Ulrich Hensel has been working almost obsessively focussing on one single subject: construction sites. His images are often abstract and sometimes minimalist – "grids, dots, fastenings and iron grilles extend across the pictures in rigorous formations defined by the functions of the objects shown" – and inevitably create associations with the geometric abstract art of Kazimir Malevich and Piet Mondrian. The technical world of rebars, Lintels, insulation, wall markings, cladding and steel bars in his works are the metaphors to works from Mark Rothko, Donald Judd as well as Cy Twombly. Like Leonardo da Vinci recognized a world from drawings in a weathered wall, Ulrich Hensel loves to look at construction sites.

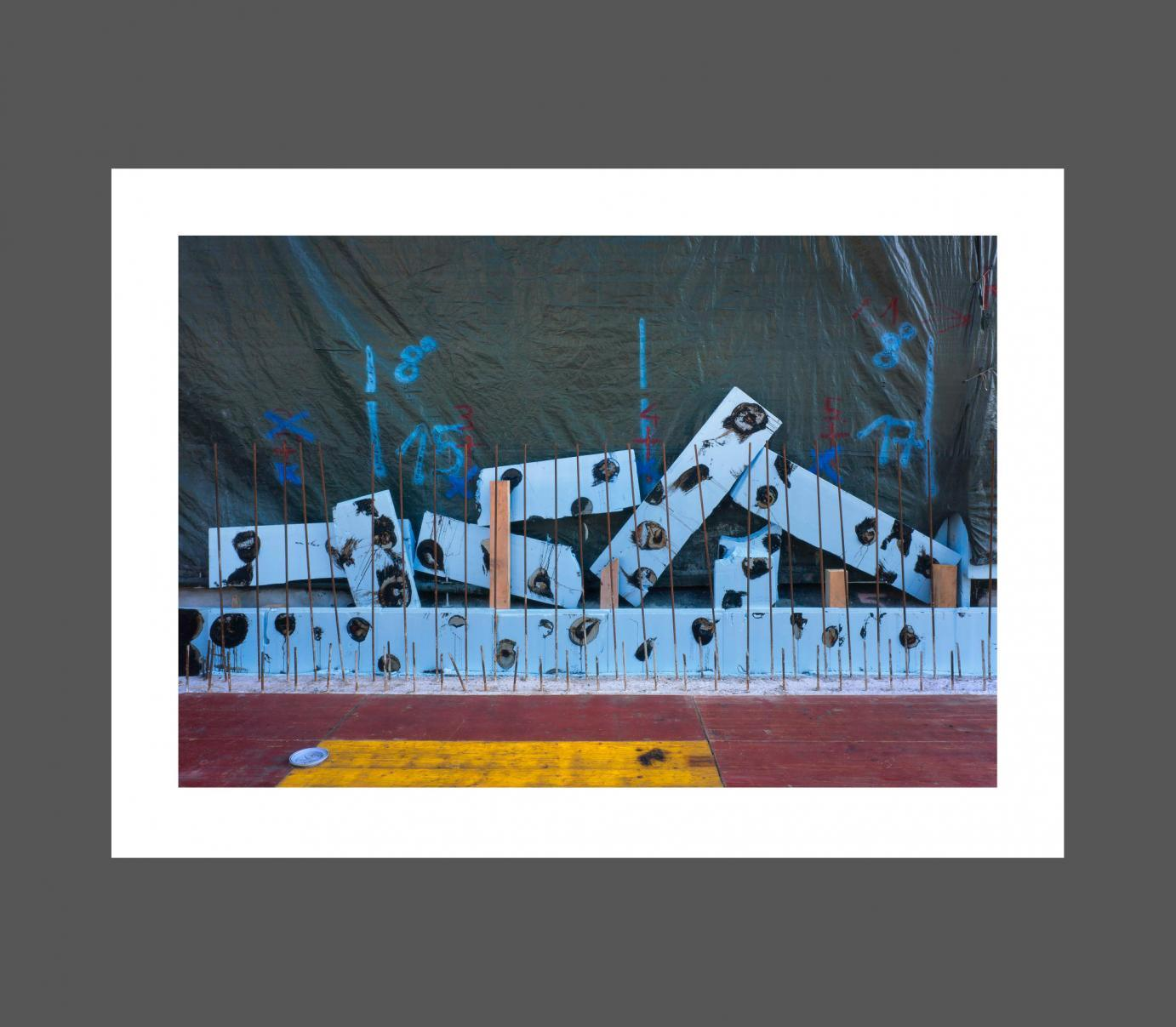
Ulrich Hensel, Am Mühlenturm, C-Print Diasec, 200 cm x 275,8 cm, 2008

Hensel's works have the feeling of extended three-dimensional object modelling in a kind of crossover between photography, painting, object, and installation art, imperfection caught as if by chance in a perfect moment.

Hensel is concerned with authenticity and avoids digital manipulations. His large-format photographs are described as "unobtrusive and complex at the same time".

== Selected exhibitions ==
- 2024 Welten in Bewegung 30th anniversary Kunstmuseum Wolfsburg with works by Tony Cragg, Cindy Sherman , Nam June Paik, Jeff Koons, Gilbert & George, Thomas Schütte, Bruce Nauman, Jörg Immendorff among others.
- 2020 In-Between Worlds. Kunstmuseum Wolfsburg, Wolfsburg, Germany.
- 2012 Exhibition project in the Joseph Beuys space at Lehmbruck Museum, Duisburg, Germany.
- 2012 State of the Art Photography. NRW Forum, Düsseldorf, Germany.
- 2011 Die Entdeckung der Wirklichkeit – Photographie an der Kunstakademie Düsseldorf von 1970 bis Heute, with works from Joseph Beuys, Andreas Gursky, Imi Knoebel, Sigmar Polke, Gerhard Richter, Rosemarie Trockel at Akademie-Galerie. Düsseldorf, Germany.
- 2007 Galerie Sprüth Magers, Projektraum, Munich, Germany.
- 2002 Galerie Thomas Taubert, Düsseldorf, Germany.

== Public Collections ==
Kunstmuseum Wolfsburg with several large-format photographic works.

== Art market ==
Most of Hensel's photos come in editions of six with two artist's proof.
