= Hoevelaken =

- Town
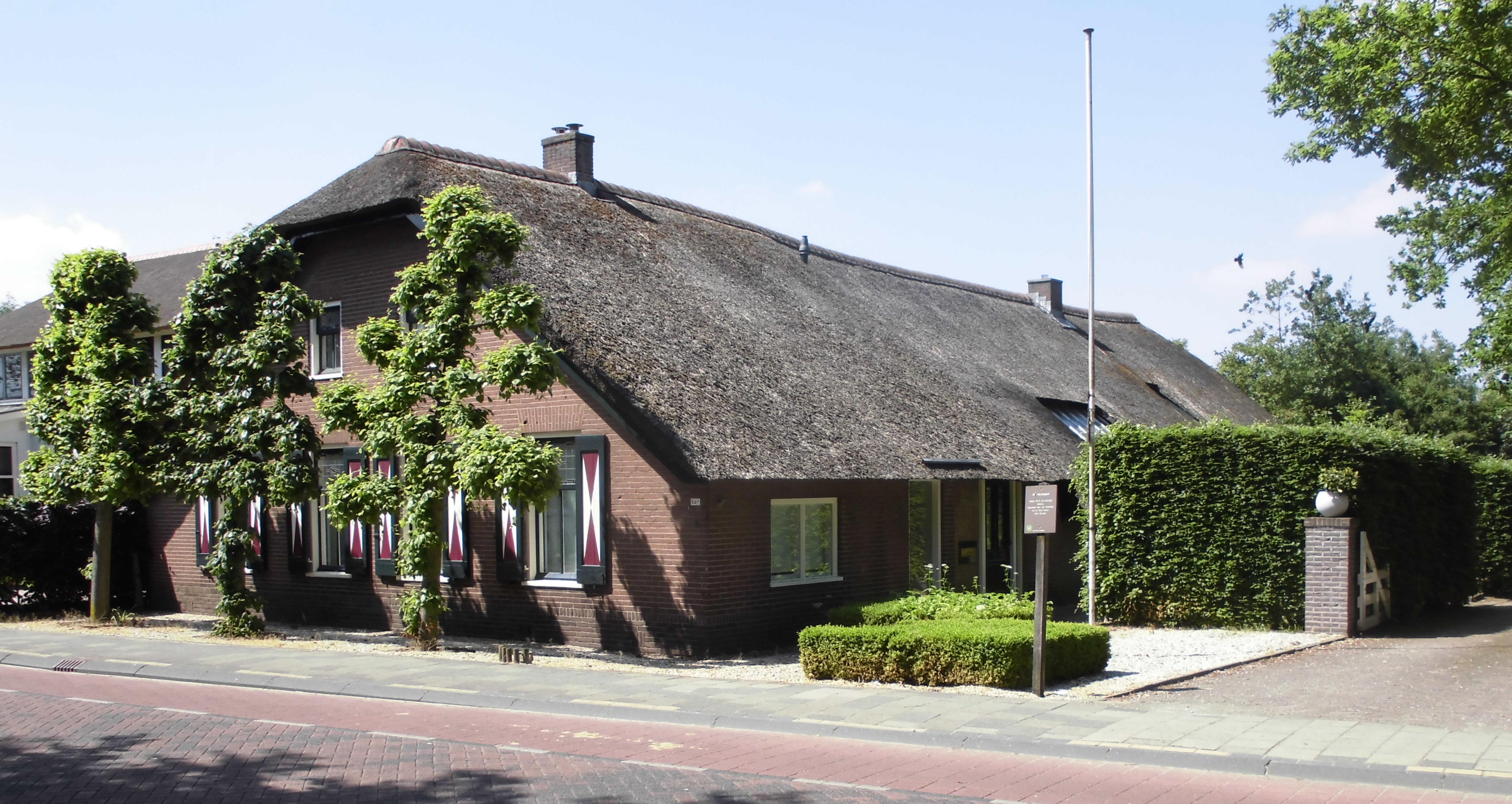
- Farm in Hoevelaken

- Flag Coat of arms

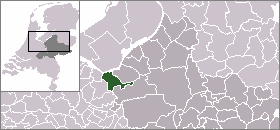

- The town centre (dark green) and the statistical district (light green) of Hoevelaken in the municipality of Nijkerk.
- Coordinates: 52°10′N 5°28′E
- Country: Netherlands
- Province: Gelderland
- Municipality: Nijkerk

Area
  - Total: 7.38 km^{2} (2.85 sq mi)
- Elevation: 4 m (13 ft)

Population (2021)
  - Total: 9,570
  - Density: 1,300/km^{2} (3,360/sq mi)
- Time zone: UTC+1 (CET)
  - Summer (DST): UTC+2 (CEST)
- Postal code: 3871
- Dialing code: 033

Hoevelaken is a town in the Dutch province of Gelderland. It is a part of the municipality of Nijkerk, and lies about 5 km east of Amersfoort.

Hoevelaken was a separate municipality until 2000, when it was merged with Nijkerk.

== History ==
It was first mentioned in 1132 as Hovelaken, and means "estate near the river Laak". It started as a linear settlement. In 1402, the castle Huis te Hoevelaken was built. In 1672, it was destroyed and probably most of the village was destroyed as well. Between 1806 and 1809, the road from Amersfoort to Deventer was paved which resulted in an increase of economical activity in the village. The tower of the Dutch Reformed Church dates from the 16th century. The medieval church has disappeared during the extensions of 1866 and 1930. In 1840, Hoevelaken was home to 742 people.

== Transport links ==
In national context, the town is mostly known because of the homonymous motorway interchange between the E30, E231 and E232. This interchange is an important hub for north- and eastbound traffic in the Netherlands.

Hoevelaken railway station opened in 2012 to serve the town.

== Notable residents ==
- Henry Timmer, football player
- Levi van Veluw, artist and photographer
- Conny Vandenbos, singer

== Gallery ==
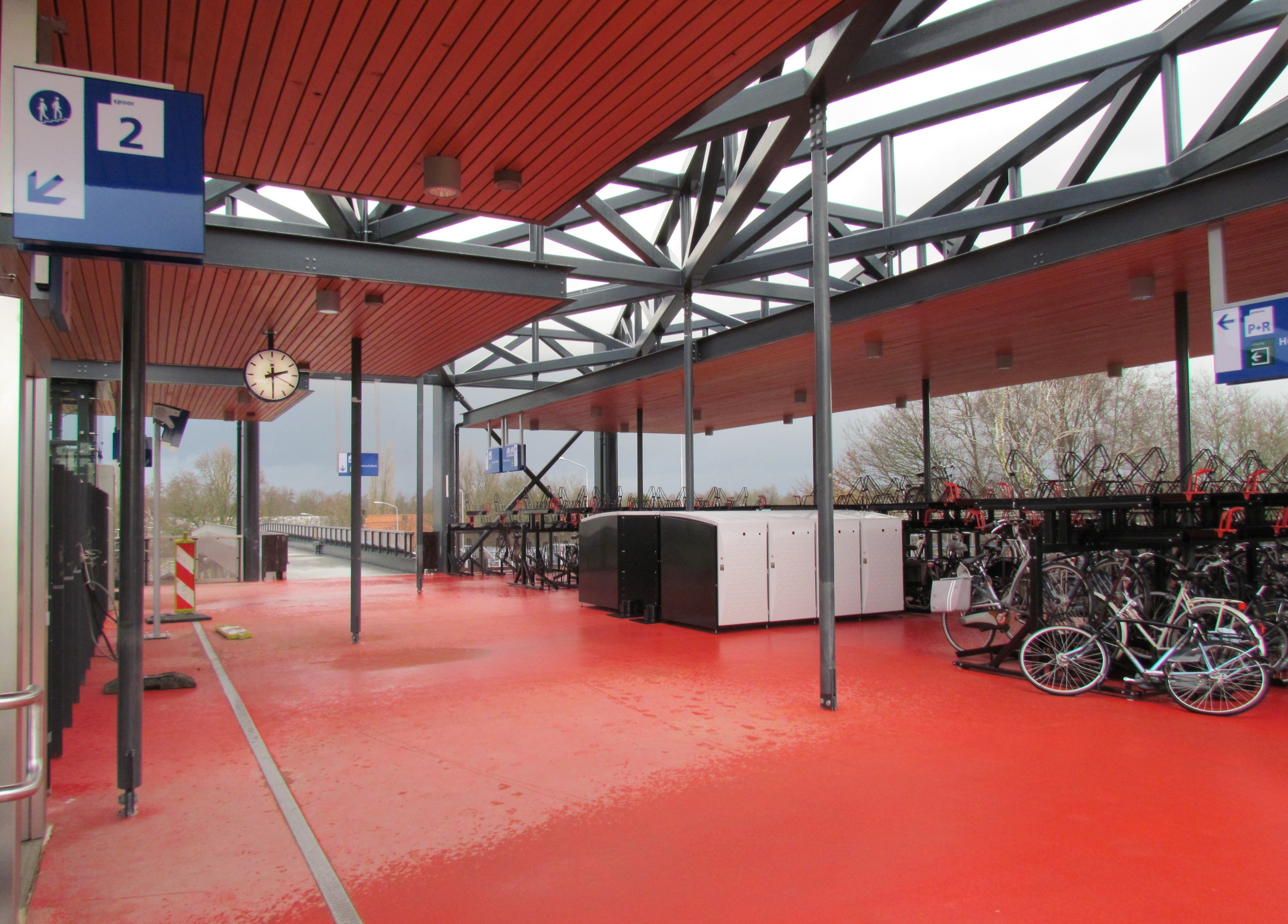
Railway station

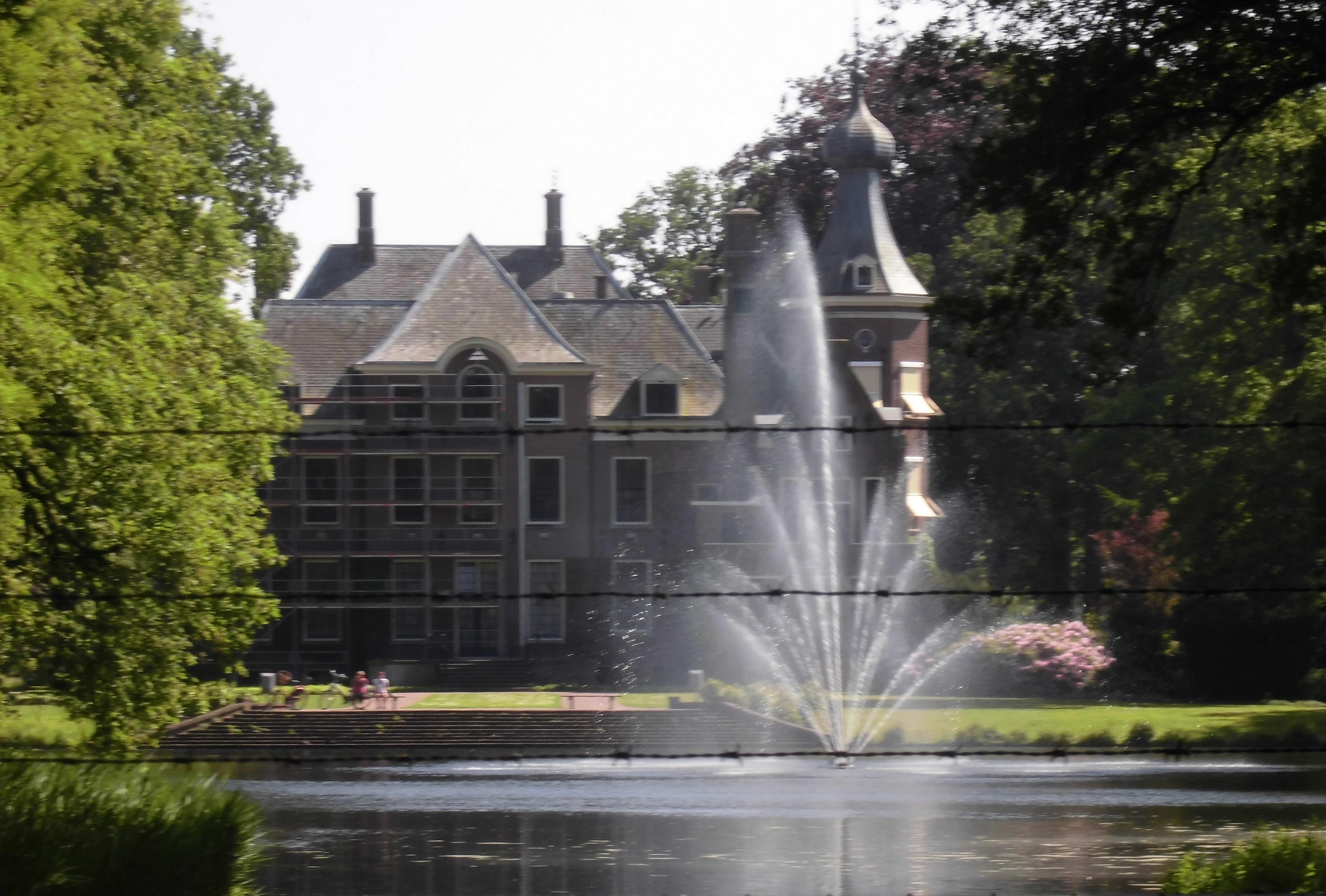
Huis te Hoevelaken

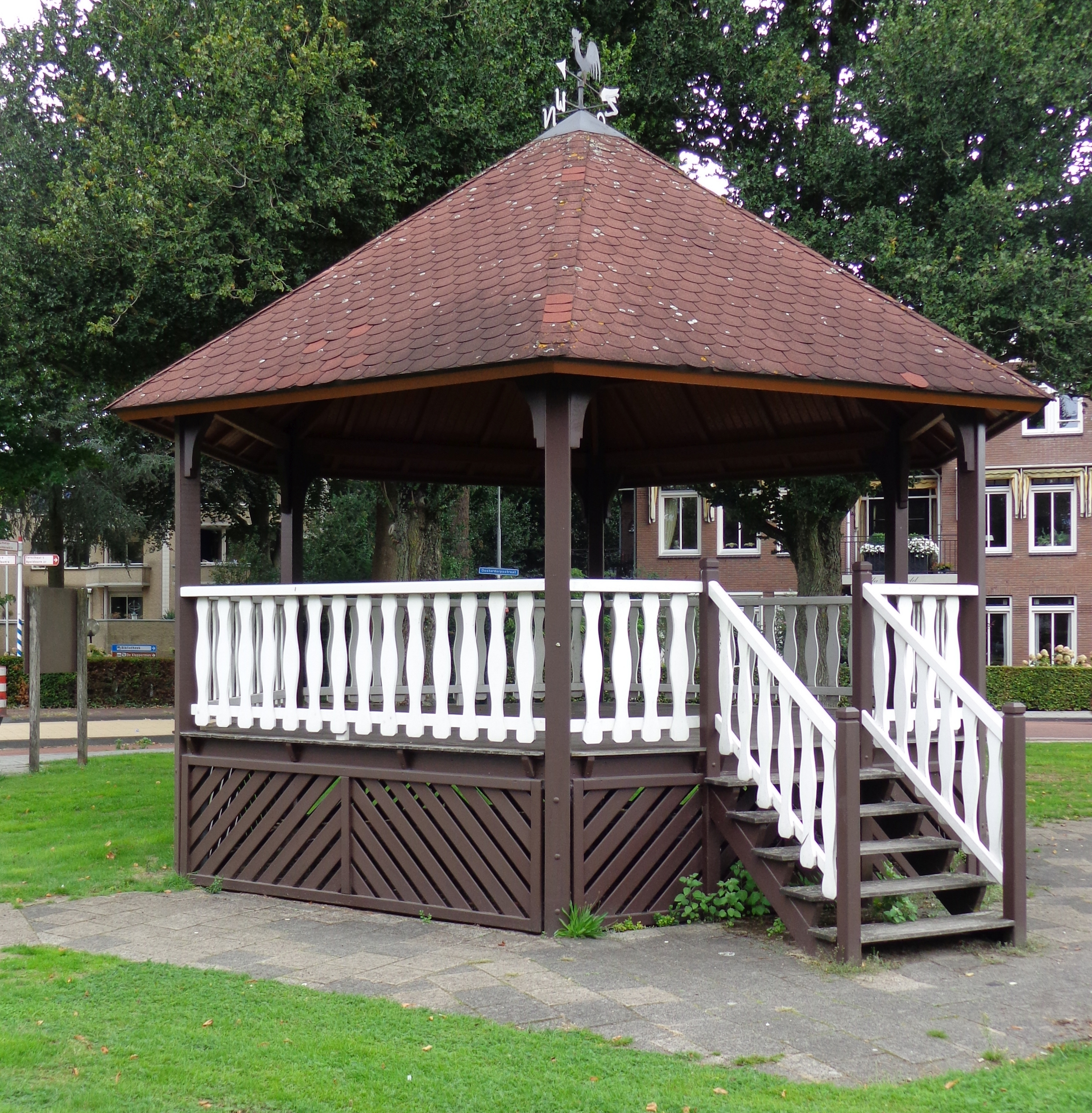
Bandstand

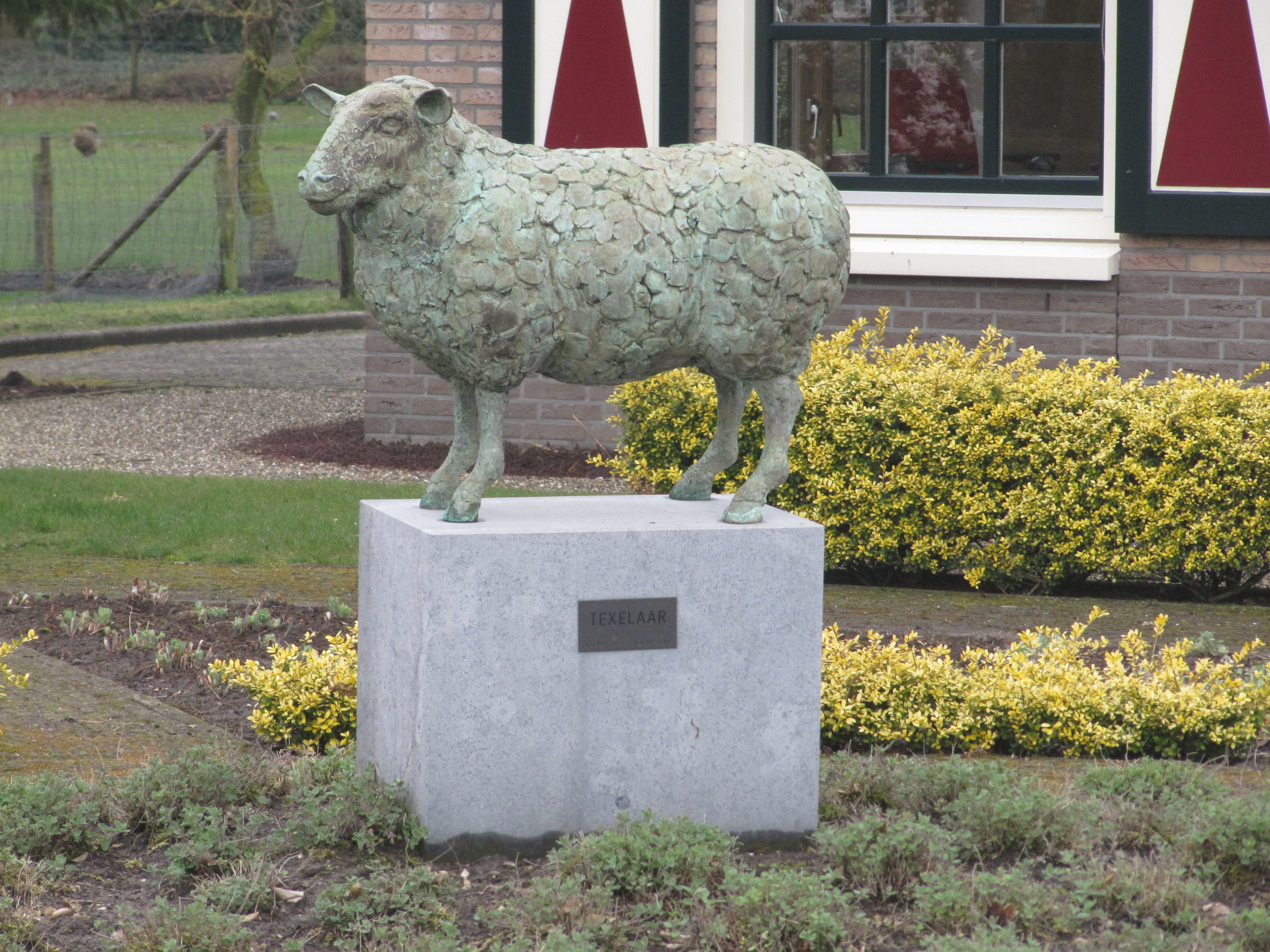
Sheep statue
