= Wêr bisto =

Single by Twarres

from the album Stream
- Language: Frisian
- English title: Where are you
- Released: June 10, 2000
- Genre: Folk-pop

Wêr bisto (English: Where are you) is the debut single by Frisian band Twarres. It won the audience award at the 1999 Frisian Song Contest, and was released as a single on 10 July 2000, and became the first Frisian-language single to reach number one on the Dutch Top 40.
