= De Hempenserpoldermolen =

Smock mill in Friesland, Netherlands

De Hempenserpoldermolen, Wergea
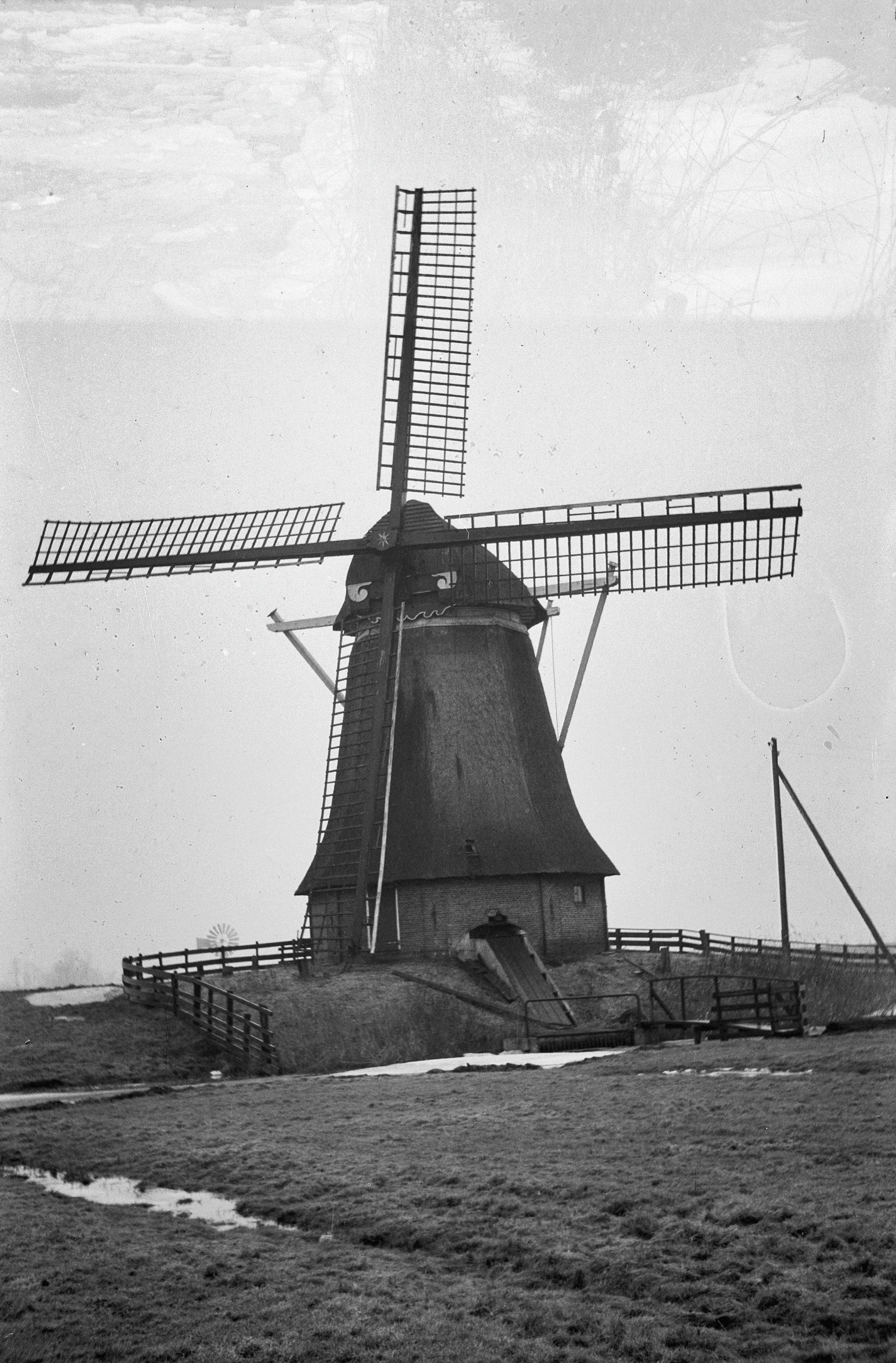
- De Hempenserpoldermolen, January 1970.

Origin
- Mill name: De Hempenserpoldermolen
- Mill location: Achter Hempensermeer, Wergea
- Coordinates: 53°10′03″N 5°50′28″E
- Operator(s): Molenstichting Boarnsterheim
- Year built: 1863

Information
- Purpose: Drainage mill
- Type: Smock mill
- Storeys: Two storey smock
- Base storeys: One storey base
- Smock sides: Eight sides
- No. of sails: Four sails
- Type of sails: Common sails
- Windshaft: Cast iron
- Winding: Tailpole and winch
- Auxiliary power: Electric motor, formerly a diesel engine
- Type of pump: Archimedes' screw

De Hempenserpoldermolen is a smock mill in Wergea, Friesland, Netherlands which was built in 1863 and has been restored to working order. It is listed as a Rijksmonument.

== History ==
De Hempenserpoldermolen was built in 1863 to drain the Hempensermeerpolder. There had been a mill on the site since 1784. The mill worked by wind alone until 1955. A Brons diesel engine had been placed in the mill in 1953. In 1955, the mill was offered for sale and demolition, contrary to a directive requiring it to be kept in working order. The Provincial Executive refused permission for the mill's demolition and suggested that the municipality took over the mill. On 30 December 1959, the water board sold the mill to the municipality Boarnsterhim for ƒ2. A condition of the sale was that the diesel engine remained in the mill. The mill was restored in 1983 by millwright Tacoma of Stiens, Friesland. The diesel engine was replaced by an electric motor in 1986. The mill was sold to the Molenstichting Boarnsterheim in 2010. It is listed as a Rijksmonument, №34603.

== Description ==
De Hempenserpoldermolen is what the Dutch describe as a Grondzeiler. It is a two storey smock mill on a single storey base. There is no stage, the sails reaching almost to ground level. The mill is winded by tailpole and winch. The smock and cap are thatched. The sails are Common sails. They have a span of 23.80 metres (78 ft 1 in). The sails are carried on a cast iron windshaft, which was cast by Gietijzerij De Prins van Oranje, The Hague in 1889. The windshaft carries the brake wheel which has 60 cogs. This drives the wallower (30 cogs) at the top of the upright shaft. At the bottom of the upright shaft there are two crown wheels The upper crown wheel, which has 36 cogs drives an Archimedes' screw via a crown wheel. The lower crown wheel, which has 37 cogs is carried on the axle of an Archimedes' screw, which is used to drain the polder. The axle of the screw is 40 centimetres (1 ft 4 in) diameter and 5.80 metres (19 ft 0 in) long. The screw is 90 centimetres (2 ft 11 in) diameter. It is inclined at 29.5°. Each revolution of the screw lifts 180 litres (40 imp gal) of water.

== Public access ==
De Hempenserpoldermolen is open whenever the mill is working by wind, or by appointment.
