= Levi van Veluw =

Dutch artist and photographer (born 1985)

- Born: 1985 (age 39–40); Hoevelaken, Netherlands
- Education: Artez Institute of the Arts
- Known for: Visual arts, photography
- Website: www.levivanveluw.nl

Levi van Veluw (born 1985) is a Dutch contemporary artist.

== Life ==
As of 2012, he lives and works in Amsterdam.

== Work ==
Levi van Veluw has produced multi-disciplinary works that include photographs, videos, sculptures, installations and drawings.

== Exhibitions ==
The artist first became known in 2008 with his solo exhibition Landscapes at Galerie Ron Mandos in Amsterdam. This coincided with him being awarded the International Photo Award in New York for the photo series "Ballpoints", and the selection of one of his video works for the Whitstable Biennale UK.

In 2010, the work of the artist was showcased in a series of major museum exhibitions, including the exhibition "Dead or Alive" at the Museum of Arts and Design in New York, Marres House for contemporary Culture Maastricht, Ars Electronica in Linz, Centre of Contemporary Art, Toruń, Poland.

In addition to his work in his individual practice, Levi van Veluw has also worked on commissions for private clients. In this way, he has collaborated, in 2012, with director of the Zeitz MoCAA Marc Coetzee on the film "Family" in the frame of the Films4peace project. In 2014, van Veluw created for Hermès a life-sized site-specific installation for one of their main window in Shanghai.

Van Veluw's works have also been widely shown at international art fairs such as, among others, The Armory Show New York, Art Brussels, Volta Basel, and Barcelona Loop.

== Awards ==
Van Veluw is the recipient of the Photographer of the Year Award at the IPA International Photo Awards in the U.S., as well as the winner of the public prize De Volkskrant Beeldende Kunst prijs at the Stedelijk Museum Schiedam.

== See also ==
- List of photographers
