= Mirjam Timmer =

Dutch singer-songwriter (born 1982)

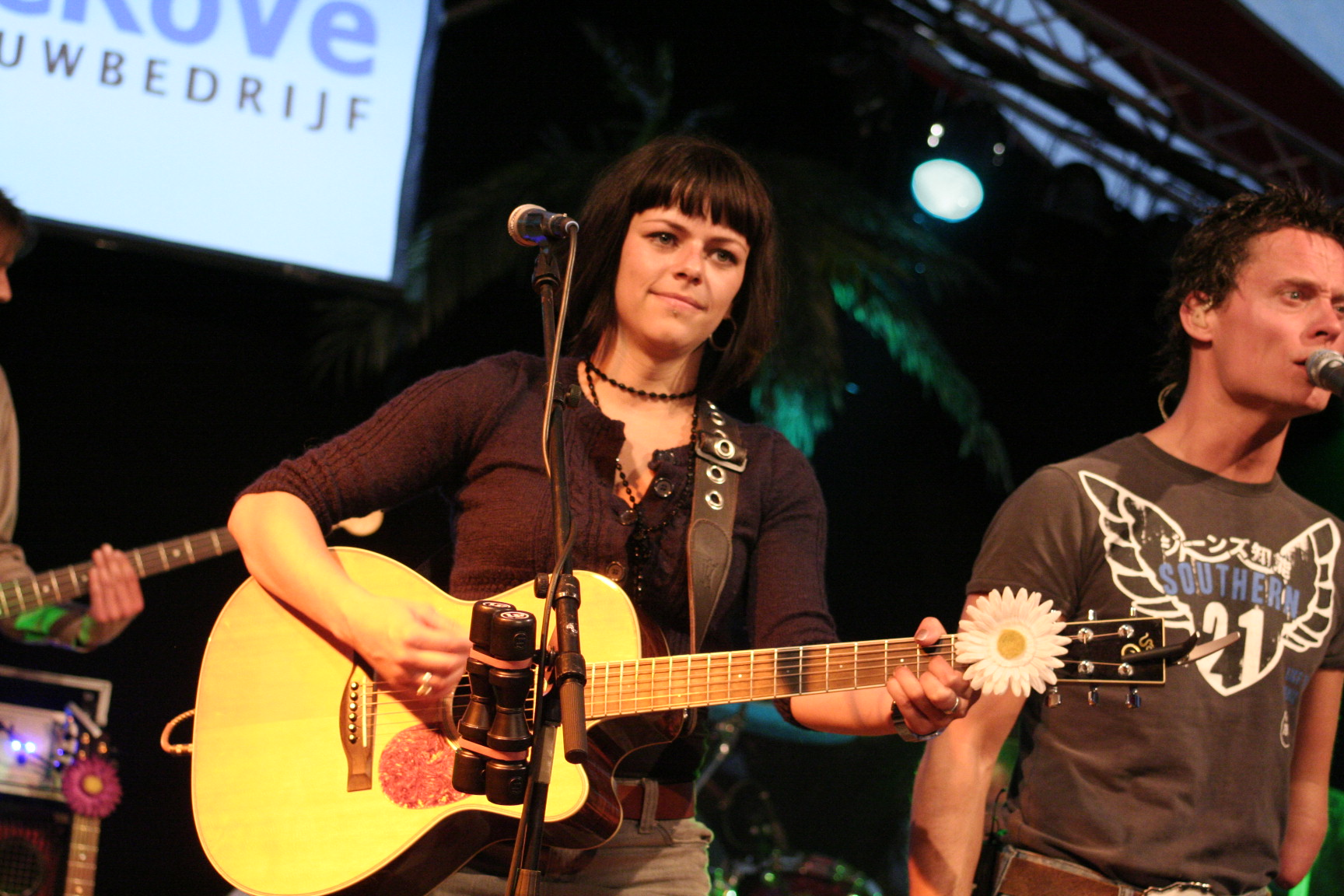

Background information
- Also known as: Mir
- Born: 1 July 1982 (age 43); Wergea, Netherlands
- Member of: Twarres

Mirjam Timmer (born 1 July 1982) is a Dutch singer-songwriter. Since 2006, she has performed under the name Mir, short for Mirjam, but also the Russian word for "Peace".

Timmer is from the Frisian village of Wergea, where she was exposed to music and songwriting as a child. Together with Johan van der Veen she performed in a talent show under the name Twarres. This led to the duo's success, and in 2000 they scored a hit in the Netherlands and Flanders with the song "Wêr Bisto" recorded in their native West Frisian. They followed this success with the singles "She Couldn't Laugh", "Children," and "I Need To Know." Their debut album, Stream, went platinum.

In 2003, Timmer wrote music for the West Frisian-language musical De lêste brief. Timmer and van der Veen decided later that year to break up Twarres. "Face To Face," her first single under the name Mir, appeared in 2006. She later released the solo album Files From London.
