= Hans Op de Beeck =

Belgian visual artist

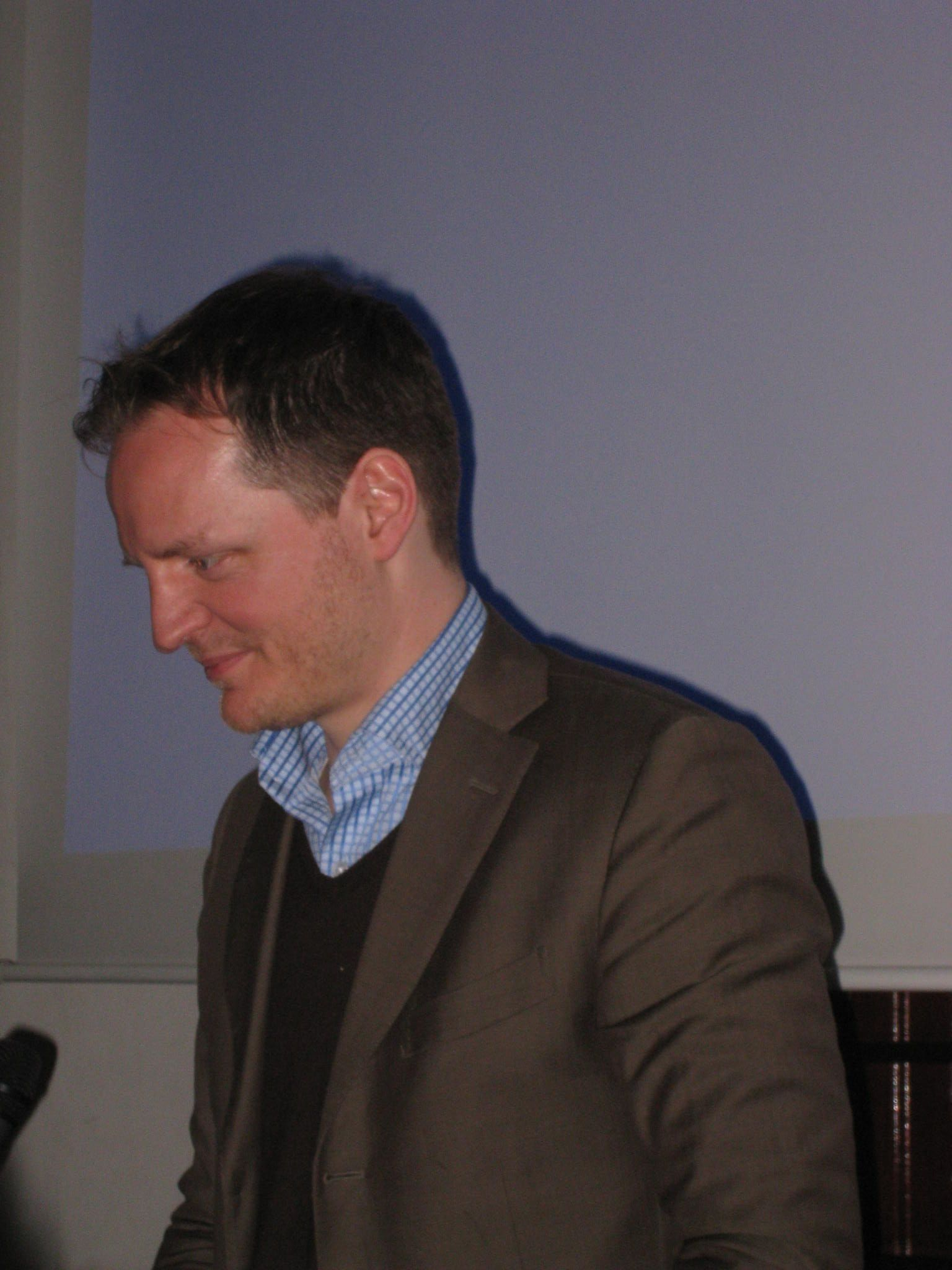
Hans Op de Beeck

Hans Op de Beeck (1969, Turnhout) is a Belgian visual artist who lives and works in Brussels. For over twenty years he has exhibiting internationally.

== Education/programs ==
- 2002–2003: Artist at the MoMA PS1 Studio Program, New York
- 1998–1999: Participant at the Rijksakademie, Amsterdam (post-MA)
- 1996–1997: Participant at The Higher Institute for Fine Arts-Flanders, Antwerp (post-MA)
- 1992–1996: Master's degree in Visual Arts, Higher Institute Sint-Lukas, Brussels

== Oeuvre ==
Hans Op de Beeck has developed his career through international exhibitions over the past ten years. His work consists of sculptures, installations, video work, photography, animated films, drawings, watercolours and writing (short stories). It is his quest for the most effective way of presenting the concrete contents of each work that determines the medium that the artist ultimately selects. The scale can vary from the size of a small watercolour to a large, three-dimensional installation of 600m2.

The artist not only uses a very wide variety of media, but also deliberately employs a diversity of aesthetic forms, ranging from an economical, minimalist visual language to overloaded, exaggerated designs, always with the aim of articulating the content of the work as precisely as possible.

== Biography ==
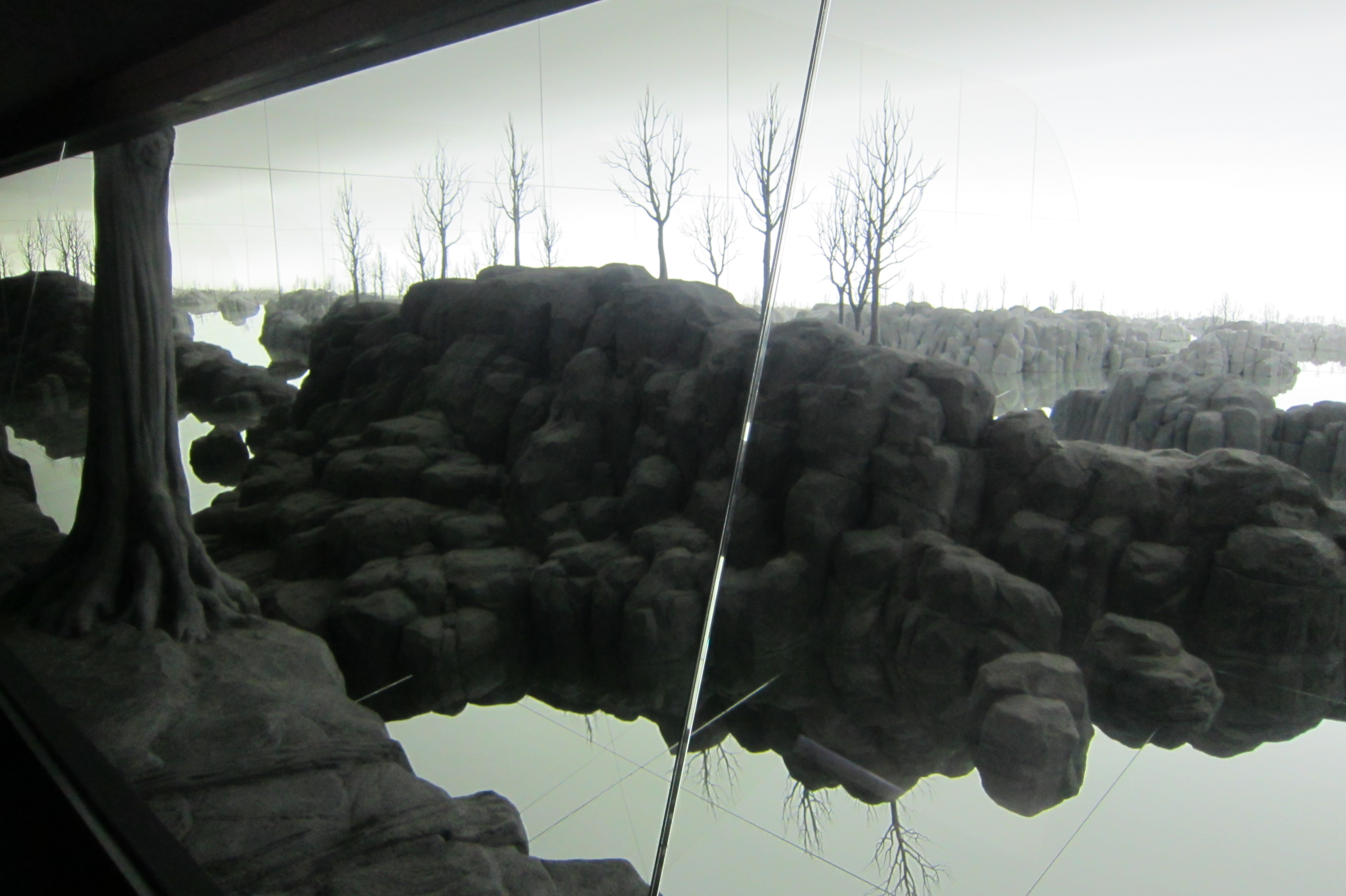
The Quiet View (2015) Interior of the Installation in Herkenrode, Hasselt.

Hans Op de Beeck attended the Vrije Kunsten program at the Kunsthogeschool Sint-Lukas in Brussels. Afterwards he studied for a year at the Higher Institute of Fine Arts, and then for two years at the Rijksakademie (Amsterdam). In 2002–2003 he was artist in residence for one year at the MoMA PS1 in New York.

From 2001, when he became the winner of the Young Belgian Painting Prize, he became widely known for his artistic work in the form of large-scale installations, some of which can be seen in public places, such as Lily Pond (2017) in Tongeren or The Quiet View (2015) on the Herkenrode site in Hasselt, on the site of Abdij van Herkenrode. The work aims to evoke the silence that once prevailed in the church.

== Themes ==
"I really like old paintings and the idea of offering a window to the world so that you invite the viewer to just stare, I hope to recall that moment when you put your own individual stories aside and just can be with or in an image, for me that is the space of art - which I also find in old paintings - just looking at a landscape of Joachim Patinir or an interior of Johannes Vermeer, and letting go of everything. in the old idea of catharsis: the tragic and problematic, but at the same time comforting quality of the image." (Hans Op de Beeck in an interview with Marc Holthof from H ART)

Thematically, the work concentrates on our laborious and problematic relationship with time, space and each other. Op de Beeck shows the viewer non-existent, but identifiable places, moments and characters that appear to have been taken from contemporary everyday life, aiming thereby to capture in his images the tragicomic absurdity of our postmodern existence. Key themes are the disappearance of distances, the disembodiment of the individual and the abstraction of time that have resulted from globalisation and the changes to our living environment that developments in media, automation and technology have brought about.

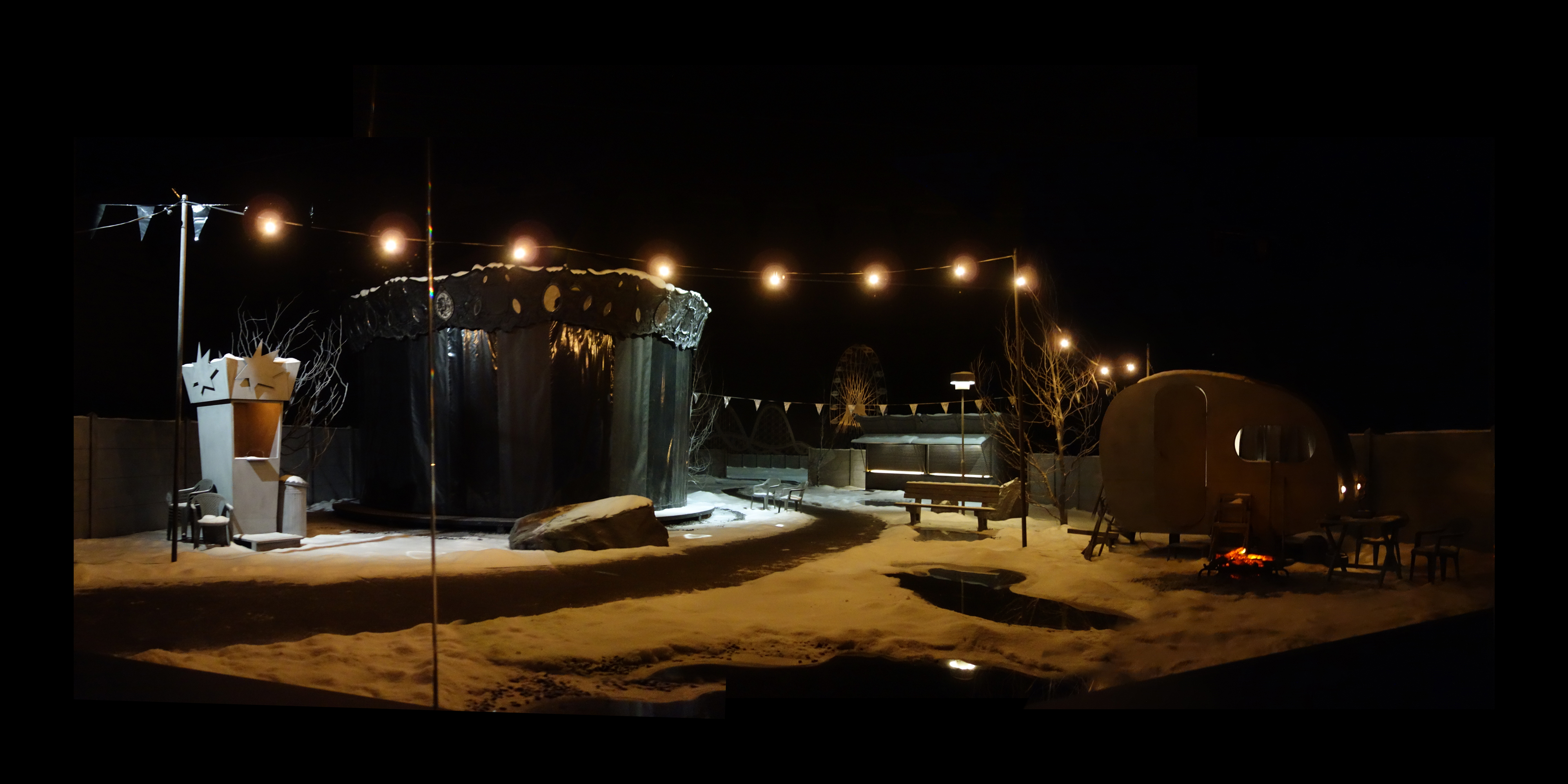
The Amusement Park (2015)

In several of Hans Op de Beecks's works time seems to freeze, as in The Amusement Park (2015), which shows a night scene in an indefinable suburb where an abandoned amusement park is set up. The soft, grey plaster of which the work is constructed seems to abstract the attractions in dark stone, like a kind of contemporary Pompei, covered with the dust of the layered, silent time. This theme of a stationary or manipulated time dimension can also be found in his films, such as Night Time (2015), in which watercolours come to life.

Although many of Hans Op de Beeck's works are very large in size, we still find the small, poetic detail in his oeuvre. In 2009, the artist presented a new video entitled Staging Silence, in which two pairs of anonymous hands continually transform a world on scale into a new image in front of the spectator's eyes. In doing so, you can follow how the artist repeatedly shapes a completely fictional, but still very recognisable, environment with the most everyday elements such as cotton wool, cardboard or sugar, which are as perishable as life itself. The deceptive self-evidence, with which the different scenes of the film are guided, is at odds with the fragile and uncertain form from which they arise. In a very subtle way, Hans Op de Beeck presents universal themes that are recognisable to everyone, young and old. In 2013 he created a sequel to this film, Staging Silence (2).

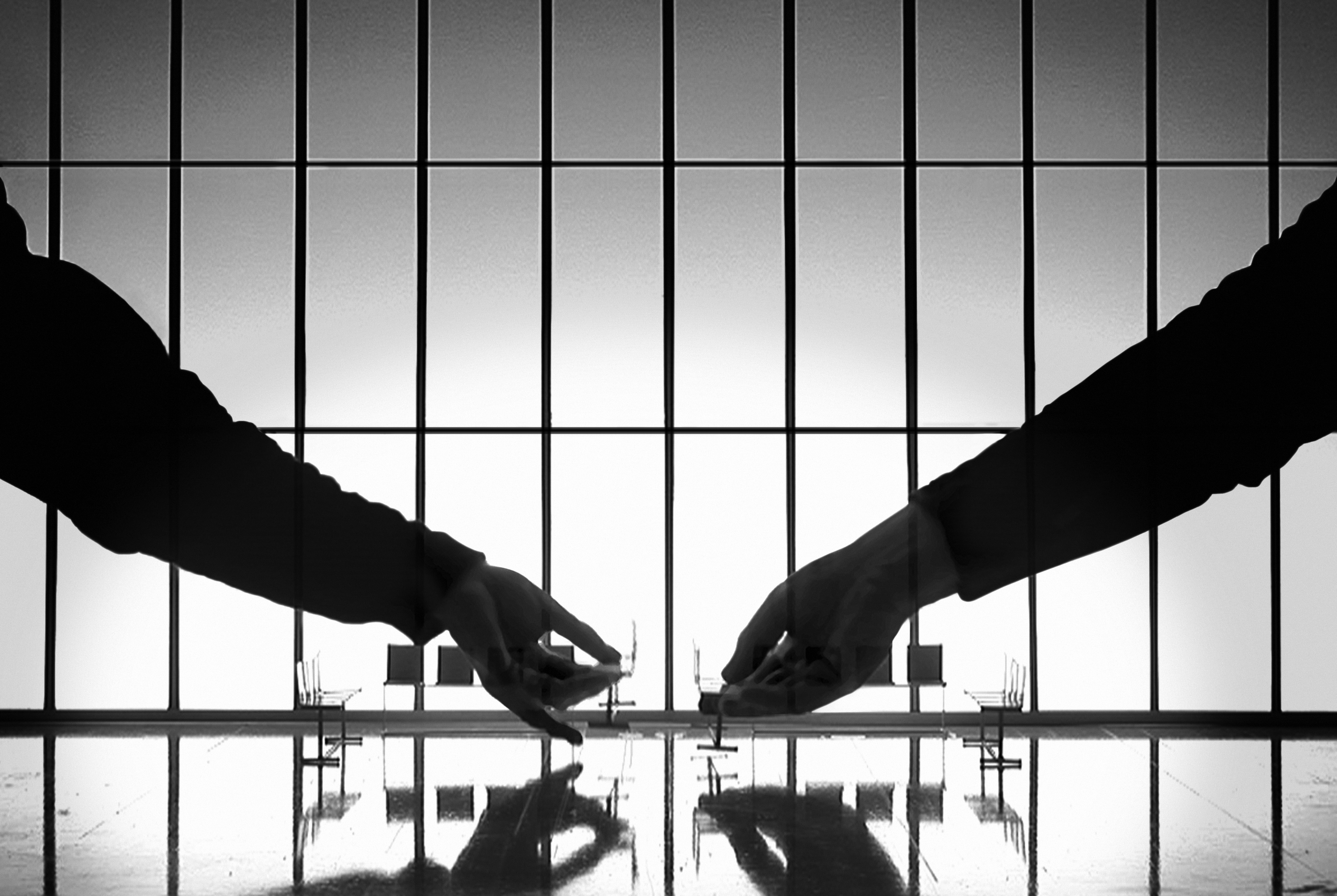
Staging Silence 1 (2009)

Hans Op de Beeck sometimes calls his works "proposals" - they are irrefutably fictional, constructed and staged, leaving it up to the viewer whether to take the work seriously, as a sort of parallel reality, or immediately to put it into perspective, as no more than a visual construct. The artist also questions the difficult relationship between reality and representation, between what we see and what we want to believe, between what is and what we create for ourselves in order to make it easier to deal with our own insignificance and lack of identity. The visual output of that investigation often produces slumbering, insidious, melancholy and astonishing images.

== Selected works ==
=== In My Brother's Gardens ===
In My Brother's Gardens is a 2003 film adapted from his own 2001 novella, based around the metaphor of formal Baroque gardens as a bastion against the unpredictability of life.

=== Night Time ===
Night Time is a 2015 animated film, monochromatic, full of shadows, with no text, based on a series of large black and white watercolours.

== Awards ==
- 2017: Winner of the Pino Pascali Award - 20th Edition, Polignano a Mare
- 2009: Catholic University of Leuven Culture Prize 2009–2010
- 2006: Winner of the Prize Eugène Baie 2003–2005, Antwerp
- 2001: Winner of the 'Prix Jeune Peinture Belge 2001', Palais des Beaux Arts, Brussels

== Publications (selected) ==
- "Hans Op de Beeck - Works", 2017, Lannoo, 448 p., ISBN 978-94-0143-714-1
- "Sea of Tranquillity", 2011, Ludion, 168 p., ISBN 978-94-6130-027-0
- "Hans Op de Beeck: The Wilderness Inside - Location (6)", 2008, 92 p., ISBN 978-9-081-34170-7 (with text from Nicolas de Oliveira & Nicola Oxley)
- "Hans Op de Beeck: Extensions", 2007, Hatje Cantz Verlag, 112 p., ISBN 978-3-7757-2096-0 (with text by Hans Op de Beeck)
- "Hans Op de Beeck: On Vanishing" - Nicolas de Oliveira and Nicola Oxley, 2007 Mercatorfonds & Xavier Hufkens, 368 p., ISBN 978-90-6153-711-3 (winnaar Plantin-Moretus Award 2008)
- "Drifting", Published by Studio Hans Op de Beeck in a limited edition of 100 copies (+20 AP's), Hardcover, 28 pages

== Solo exhibitions (selected) ==
- GEM Museum voor Actuele Kunst, Den Haag, NL, 2004.
- M HKA Museum Hedendaagse Kunst, Antwerp, BE, 2006.
- Centraal Museum, Utrecht, NL, 2007.
- Kunstmuseum, Thun, CH, 2010.
- Centro de Arte Caja de Burgos, Burgos, ES, 2010.
- Butler Gallery, Kilkenny, IR, 2012.
- Kunstverein, Hannover, DE, 2012.
- Tampa Museum of Art, Tampa, USA, 2013.
- The Harn Museum of Art, Gainesville, FL, USA, 2013.
- FRAC Paca, Marseille, FR, 2013.
- MIT List Visual Arts Center, Cambridge, Boston MA, US, 2014.
- MOCA Cleveland, OH, US, 2014.
- Sammlung Goetz, Munich, DE, 2014.
- Screen Space, Melbourne, AU, 2015.
- Espace 104, Paris, FR, 2016.
- Art Unlimited, Basel, CH, 2016.
- Kunstraum, Dornbirn, AU, 2017.
- Morsbroich Museum, Leverkusen, DE, 2017.
- Kunstmuseum Wolfsburg, Wolfsburg, DE, 2017.
- Fondazione Museo Pino Pascali, Polignano a Mare, IT, 2017.
- Marianne Boesky Gallery, New York, NY, 2019.
- Kunsthalle Krems, Krems an der Donau, Austria, 2019.
- Amos Rex, Helsinki, Finland, 2022.
- Royal Museum of Fine Arts Antwerp, 2025

== Group exhibitions (selected) ==
- Reina Sofia, Madrid, ES
- Scottsdale Museum of Contemporary Art, AZ, US
- Towada Art Center, Towada, JP
- ZKM, Karlsruhe, DE
- MACRO, Rome, IT
- Whitechapel Art Gallery, London, GB
- MoMA PS1, New York, NY, US
- Musée National d’Art Moderne, Centre Pompidou, Paris, FR
- Wallraf-Richartz Museum, Köln, DE
- Hangar Bicocca, Milano, IT
- Hara Museum of Contemporary Art, Tokyo, JP
- 21C Museum, Louisville, Kentucky, US
- The Drawing Center, New York, NY, US
- Kunsthalle Wien, Vienna, AT
- Shanghai Art Museum, Shanghai, CN
- MAMBA, Buenos Aires, AR
- Haus der Kunst, Munich, DE
- Museo d’Arte Moderna di Bologna, Bologna, IT
- Kunstmuseum Bonn, Bonn, DE
- Musée des Beaux-Arts de Caen, Caen, FR
- KMSK, Brussel, BE
- Museum Kunstpalast, Düsseldorf, DE

== Collections ==
- Akzo Nobel, Arnhem (The Netherlands)
- Caldic Collection, Rotterdam (The Netherlands)
- MuHKA, Antwerp (Belgium)
- SMAK, Ghent (Belgium)
- Sammlung Goetz, Munich (Germany)
- Toledo Museum of Arts, Ohio (USA)
- La Maison Rouge, Paris (France)
- Chamarande - Centre Artistique et Culturel, Chamarande (France)
- MARTa Herford, Herford (Germany)
- Cera Foundation, Leuven (Belgium)
- Burger Collection, Zumikon (Switzerland)
- Collection Gensollen, Marseille (France)
- Belgacom Art Foundation, Brussels (Belgium)
- Collection Groupe Lhoist, Brussels (Belgium)
- Belfius Art Collection, Brussels (Belgium)
- National Bank of Belgium, Brussels (Belgium)
- Swift Collection, La Hulpe (Belgium)
