= Kunstmuseum Wolfsburg =

Coordinates: 52.4186°N 10.7854°E

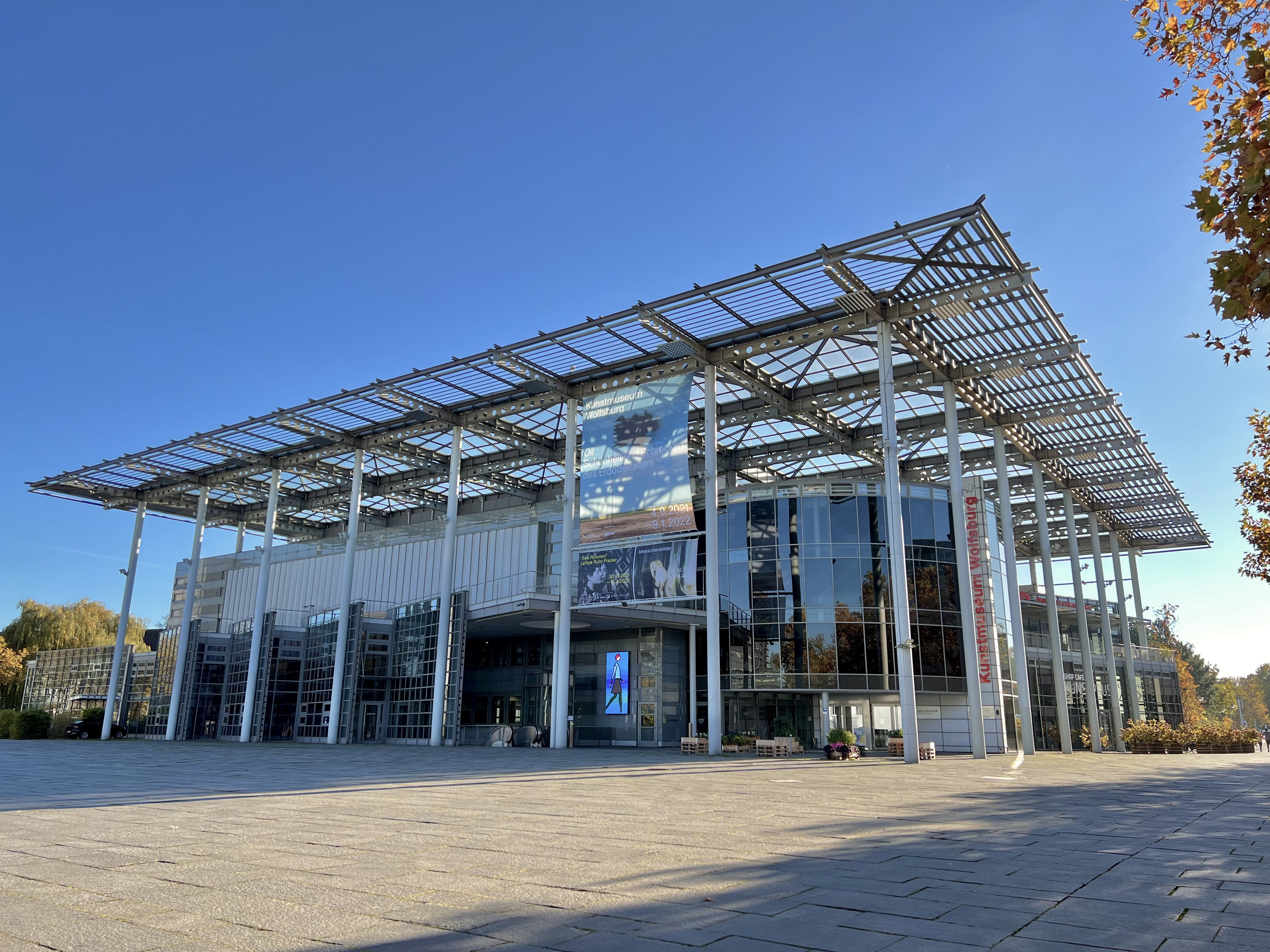
- Established: 1994
- Location: Wolfsburg, Lower Saxony, Germany
- Type: Art museum
- Director: Andreas Beitin
- Architects: Peter Schweger and Partners

The Kunstmuseum Wolfsburg is an art museum in central Wolfsburg, Lower Saxony, opened 1994. It presents modern and contemporary art and is financed by the Kunststiftung Volkswagen.

It takes up aspects of the industrial city of Wolfsburg, which was only founded in 1938: modernity, urbanity, internationality and quality. The Kunstmuseum is located at the southern end of the pedestrian zone in the vicinity of the Alvar-Aalto-Kulturhaus, Theater, Planetarium and CongressPark.

== The museum ==
The Kunstmuseum Wolfsburg opened in 1994 with a retrospective exhibition on the French artist Fernand Léger. The museum's founding director was the Dutchman Gijs van Tuyl, who remained in the position until 2004. He was followed by the Swiss art historian Markus Brüderlin, who was director from January 2006 until his death in March 2014. The museum has been headed since February 1, 2015 by Ralf Beil, from 2006 director of the Institut Mathildenhöhe Darmstadt. On April 1, 2019, he was succeeded by Andreas Beitin, previously director of the Aachen Ludwig Forum for International Art.

== Architecture ==
The Hamburg architectural firm of Peter Schweger and Partners planned the building of the Kunstmuseum Wolfsburg as a transparent urban loggia with an extensive overarching glass roof over the open Hollerplatz. The central exhibition hall is 16-meter high with a quadratic ground plan measuring 40 meters on each side. Its flexible possibilities allow for an individualized architecture conceived to meet the specific needs of each show. The hall is two-storied on three of its sides and enclosed by further exhibition spaces. The entire exhibition surface encompasses 3500 square meters. In conjunction with the 2007 Japan and the West exhibition, a Japan Garden was created in the inner courtyard of the building. The architect Kazuhisa Kawamura modeled it after the Zen garden of the Ryōan-ji temple in Kyōto and included elements from the architecture of Mies van der Rohe to symbolize the dialog between East and West.

== Exhibitions ==
Since its opening, the Kunstmuseum Wolfsburg has presented over 130 exhibitions on modern and contemporary art. Large-scale retrospectives from the field of classic modern art, for example Fernand Léger and Bart van der Leck, alternate with survey shows such as Full House, German Open, The Italian Metamorphosis 1943–1968 and Blast to Freeze. Monographic exhibitions devoted to contemporary artists include Carl Andre, Andy Warhol, Luc Tuymans, Olafur Eliasson, Frank Stella, James Turrell and Imi Knoebel. With the start of the new directorship in 2006, the exhibition program placed contentual accents in large-scale historical and thematic shows (ArchiSkulptur, Japan and the West, Interior/Exterior, The Art of Deceleration), solo exhibitions (James Turrell and Alberto Giacometti) as well as in mid-career retrospectives (including Douglas Gordon, Neo Rauch and Philip Taaffe) that took up the theme of modernism in the 21st century, illuminating it from various perspectives. Different exhibitions are shown in the hall and the gallery. With “Wolfsburg Unlimited. A City as World Laboratory,” Ralf Beil presented his first major exhibition in which the city was reflected in the museum – and the museum in the city.

== The collection ==
The Kunstmuseum Wolfsburg began collecting international contemporary art in 1994. The range included late modernism, Minimal Art, Conceptual Art and Arte Povera. Works by a younger generation of artists were subsequently added. Focus was placed on prominent major works, ensembles and work phases as well as the exemplary presentation of artistic developments. Instead of documenting “tendencies,” the concentration was placed on artists and works representing central aspects of the wide field of contemporary art. Artists in the collection include Carl Andre, Christian Boltanski, Douglas Gordon, Andreas Gursky, Georg Herold, Anselm Kiefer, Mario Merz, Gerhard Merz, Bruce Nauman, Neo Rauch, Burhan Dogancay, Cindy Sherman, Philip Taaffe, Jeff Wall, Olafur Eliasson, Douglas Gordon, Thomas Schütte and Jeppe Hein. Works from the collection are integrated into the museum's exhibitions or highlighted in special temporary shows devoted to the collection.

== Further facilities ==
The Kunstmuseum is sponsored and supported by the Freundeskreis Kunstmuseum Wolfsburg e. V., into which the “Junge Freunde” [Young Friends] are integrated as youthful sponsors. The Studio is a generously sized space that the museum uses for school projects, workshops and creative programs. The museum restaurant Awilon and an in-house museum shop are also parts of the museum's offers.

== The foundation ==
The Kunstmuseum Wolfsburg is financed by the non-profit Kunststiftung Volkswagen. A large part of its funds derive from the foundation of Asta and Christian Holler, the former owners of the Volkswagen Versicherungsdienst GmbH (VVD). Christian Holler (1900–1969) and his wife Asta (1904–1989), decided early on to bequeath their entire estate to the common good. After Asta Holler's death in 1990, the Holler-Stiftung was accordingly established in Munich with the purpose of providing funds to benefit youth welfare, the care of the seriously ill as well as the promotion of science and art. Since 1991, the Kunstmuseum receives a large percentage of the disbursements of the Holler-Stiftung, which had already made the largest contribution to the museum's buildings costs.

== Exhibitions (selection) ==
- 1994/1995: Man Ray. ‚Neues wie Vertrautes‘: Fotografien 1919–1942
- 1995/1996: Nobuyoshi Araki – Tokyo Novelle
- 1995/1996: Nam June Paik – High Tech Allergy
- 1996: Carl Andre. Sculptor 1996
- 1996: Jeff Wall – Landscapes and other Pictures
- 1997: Pietro Donzelli. The Light of Solitude
- 1998: Andreas Gursky – Photographs 1994–1998
- 2000: Ed van der Elsken. Sweet Life
- 2005/2006: Hussein Chalayan
- 2006: Neo Rauch – New Rols
- 2007: Between Darkness & Light. Douglas Gordon
- 2009: Interieur/Exterieur: Living Art
- 2009/2010: Undeiably me. 1309 Face.
- 2009/2010: James Turrell. The Wolfsburg Project
- 2010: Rudolf Steiner and Contemporary Art and Rudolf Steiner: Alchemy of the Everyday (double exhibition)
- 2010: Alberto Giacometti – The Origin of Space. A comprehensive retrospective of the artist's mature work
- 2011: Art & Fashion. Between Skin and Clothing
- 2011: Gerwald Rockenschaub. Multidial
- 2011/2012: The Geometry of the Moment. Landscapes. Henri Cartier-Bresson
- 2011/2012: The Art of Deceleration. Motion and Rest in Art from Caspar David Friedrich to Ai Wei Wei.
- 2012: Frank Stella – The Retrospective. Works 1958–2012
- 2012/2013: Ornament. Perspectives on Modernism. Ornamental Prints from Dürer to Piranesi
- 2013: Christian Boltanski. Moved.
- 2013: Slapstick! Alÿs, Bock, Chaplin, Hein, Laurel & Hardy, Keaton, Matta-Clark u. a.
- 2013/2014: Art & Textiles – Fabric as Material and Concept in Modern Art from Klimt to the Present
- 2014: Oskar Kokoschka. Humanist and Rebel
- 2014: RealSurReal – Masterpieces of Avant-Garde Photography. Das Neue Sehen 1920 – 1950. Siegert Collection
- 2015: Walk the Line. New Paths in Drawing
- 2015: Erwin Wurm. Fichte
- 2015/2016: Dark Mirror. Art from Latinamerica since 1968
- 2015/2016: Jeppe Hein. This Way
- 2016: Wolfsburg Unlimited. A City as world laboratory
- 2016/17: In the Cage of Freedom
- 2017: This Was Tomorrow. Pop Art in Great Britain
- 2017: Pieter Hugo. Between the Devil and the Deep Blue Sea.
- 2017: Hans Op de Beeck. Out of the Ordinary
- 2017/2018: Never Ending Stories. The Loop in Art, Film, Architecture, Music, Literature and Cultural History
- 2018: Robert Lebeck. 1968
- 2018: Facing India
- 2019: Now Is The Time. 25 years collection Kunstmuseum Wolfsburg
- 2019/2020: Robin Rhode. Memory Is the Weapon
- 2019/2020: Inside – Out. Construction of the Self
- 2019/2020: Ryoji Ikeda. Data-verse
- 2020: Barbara Kasten. Works
- 2020: Ulrich Hensel. In-Between Worlds
- 2020/2021: On Everyone’s Lips. From Pieter Bruegel to Cindy Sherman
- 2021: Mischa Kuball. ReferenzRäume
- 2021/2022: Oil. Beauty and Horror in the Petrol Age
- 2021/2022: Menschenbilder (Images of Humanity)
- 2021/2022: True Pictures? LaToya Ruby Frazier
- 2022: Power! Light!
- 2022/2023: Empowerment

== Catalogues (selection) ==
- Pietro Donzelli. The Light of Solitude. Cantz, Ostfildern 1997, ISBN 3-89322-906-X.
- Andreas Gursky – Photographs 1994–1998. Cantz, Ostfildern 1998, ISBN 3-89322-425-4.
- Ed van der Elsken. Sweet Life 1949–2000. Wolfsburg 2000, ISBN 3-7757-0919-3.
- Neo Rauch – New Rols. DuMont, Köln 2006, ISBN 978-3-8321-7742-3
- James Turrell. The Wolfsburg Project.
- Gerwald Rockenschaub. Multidial. Kerber, Bielefeld 2011, ISBN 978-3-86678-536-6.
- Art & Fashion. Between Skin and Clothing. Kerber, Bielefeld/ Leipzig/ Berlin, ISBN 978-3-86678-538-0.
- The Art of Deceleration. Hatje Cantz, Ostfildern 2011, ISBN 978-3-7757-3243-7
- Frank Stella – Retrospective. Hatje Cantz, Ostfildern 2012, ISBN 978-3-7757-3407-3
- Art & Textiles. Fabric as Material and Concept in Modern Art from Klimt to the PresentHatje Cantz, Ostfildern 2013, ISBN 978-3775736275
- Dark Mirror: Art from Latin America since 1968. Works from the Daros Latinamerica Collection. 2015, ISBN 978-3981757514
- Julian Rosefeldt. Midwest. 2016, ISBN 978-3-86832-345-0.
- This Was Tomorrow. Wienand Verlag, Köln 2016, ISBN 978-3868323597
- Hans Op de Beeck. Works. Lannoo, Kunstmuseum Wolfsburg, 2017, ISBN 978-94-014-3714-1.
- Never Ending Stories. Hatje Cantz, Ostfildern 2017, ISBN 978-3-7757-4364-8
- Robert Lebeck 1968. Steidl, Göttingen 2018
- Facing India: India from a Female Point of View, Hatje Cantz, Ostfildern, 2020, ISBN 978-3-7757-4401-0
- Now Is The Time. Hatje Cantz, Ostfildern 2019, ISBN 978-3-7757-4529-1
- Robin Rhode. Memory Is The Weapon. Hatje Cantz, Ostfildern 2019, ISBN 978-3-7757-4605-2
- Barbara Kasten. Works. König, Walther, 2020, ISBN 978-3-96098-774-1
- On Everyone’s Lips. The Oral Cavity in Art and Culture – catalogue. Hatje Cantz, Ostfildern, 2020, ISBN 978-3-7757-4800-1
- Oil. Beauty and Horror in the Petrol Age. Kunstmuseum Wolfsburg. König, Walther, 2021, ISBN 978-3-7533-0096-2
- Power! Light! König, Walther, 2022, ISBN 978-3-96098-850-2
- Checkpoint - Border Views from Korea/Grenzblicke aus Korea. 2022.
- Empowerment. Art and Feminisms, Bundeszentrale für politische Bildung, 2022.
