= Minne Hoekstra =

Dutch speed skater (1884–1941)

- Minne Hoekstra

Personal information
- Nickname: De schaatsende dominee
- Born: 7 June 1884 Warga, Friesland, Netherlands
- Died: 8 April 1941 (aged 56) Scherpenzeel, Friesland, Netherlands

Sport
- Sport: Marathon speed skating
- Event: Natural ice

Minne Hoekstra (7 June 1884 – 8 April 1941) was a Dutch minister, photographer, draughtsman, and speed skater. On 2 January 1909, Hoekstra won the first official Elfstedentocht.

== Elfstedentocht winner ==
A theology student and Warga skate-maker's son, Hoekstra was the first to cross the finish line. After returning from Dokkum, he had taken a hard fall near Birdaard over a plank frozen into the ice; however, between Leeuwarden and Harlingen, he managed to overtake the leaders: Gerlof van der Leij, J. Binnema, and Jac. Schaap. The last two dropped out during the course of the race, and while Lieutenant Tite Rooseboom drew close, Hoekstra proved to have the greater stamina, finishing three minutes ahead of Van der Leij and six minutes ahead of Rooseboom, with a total time of 13 hours and 50 minutes. Other skaters followed more than an hour later.

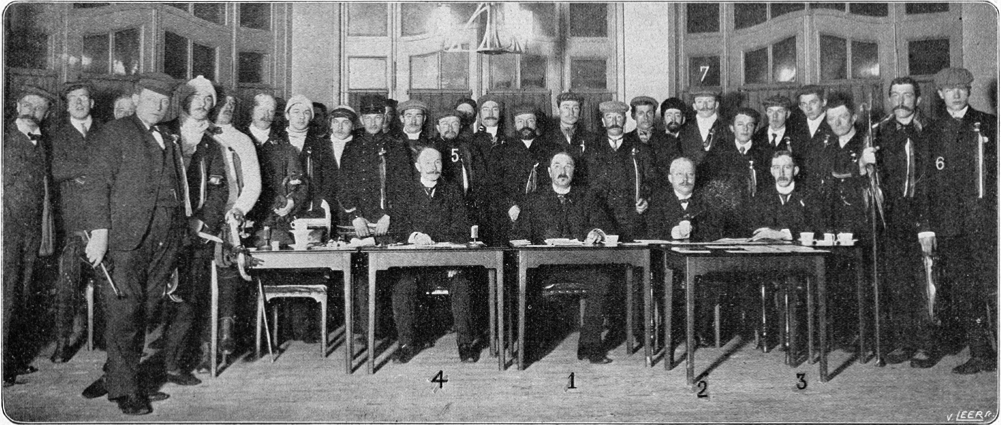
Participants and board in 1909; Minne Hoekstra is marked with a 5.

== Competition winner ==
Afterwards, a competition was held among the participants for the best story about the journey. As it turned out, it was Hoekstra who walked away with the top prize for the best story. The historic Elfstedentocht of 2 January 1909 – an award-winning account by the first-prize winner is a unique skating document, as the entire course of the event is known thanks to the winner's detailed description.

== Marathon speed skating results ==
Year	Elfstedentocht
1909	1st place, gold medalist(s)

=== Medal table ===
Championship	Gold (gold)	Silver (silver)	Bronze (bronze)
Elfstedentocht	1	0	0
