= Henry Timmer =

Dutch footballer

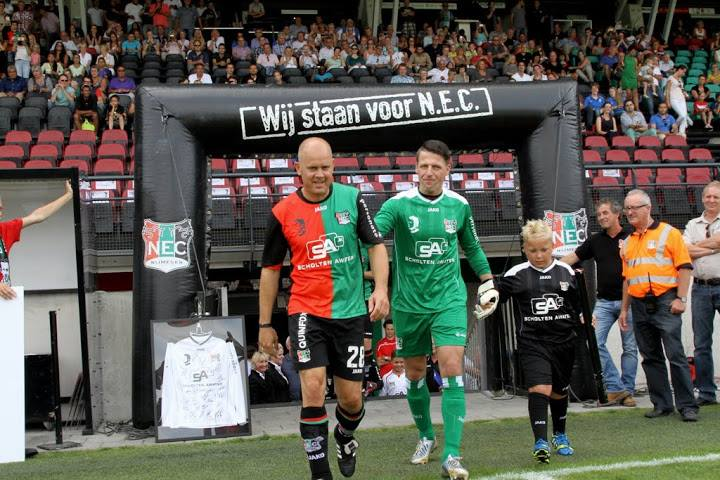
- Henry Timmer (centre) with NEC Nijmegen in 2005

Personal information
- Date of birth: 20 January 1981 (age 45)
- Place of birth: Hoevelaken, Gelderland, Netherlands
- Position: Goalkeeper

Youth career
- DDOV
- FC Utrecht
- Vitesse Arnhem

Senior career*
Years	Team	Apps	(Gls)
2002-2003	NEC Nijmegen	0	(0)
2003-2005	OBW Zevenaar	?	(0)
2005-2006	DVS '33	?	(0)
2006-2008	VVOG	?	(0)
2008-2009	Be Quick '28	?	(0)
2009-2011	Sparta Nijkerk	?	(0)
2011-2014	NSC Nijkerk	?	(0)
- * Club domestic league appearances and goals

Henry Timmer (20 January 1981 in Hoevelaken) is a Dutch retired professional goalkeeper from the Netherlands.

== Career ==
Timmer was born in the Dutch town of Hoevelaken in 1981. Timmer began his professional career in 2002 with NEC Nijmegen and retired with NSC Nijkerk after the 2014 season. Prior to this, Timmer spent his youth career with teams DDOV, FC Utrecht, and Vitesse Arnhem. From 2006 to 2008, Timmer played for VVOG. Timmer played for Sparta Nijkerk in the 2009–10 KNVB Cup, appearing in the first and second rounds with a defeat of VV Schaesberg in Round 1 and a draw against FC Zwolle in Round 2.

In a 2003 interview, Timmer stated that there has been confusion between himself and another Dutch goalkeeper with the same last name, Henk Timmer. Henry Timmer explained that many of his teammates call him "Henk" as a nickname and that when Henk Timmer was involved in a car accident, Henry Timmer was asked on multiple occasions whether it was him who had been in the accident. (Note: Timmer's direct quote in Dutch was that “toen Henk Timmer, die reservedoelman van Ajax, met zijn auto in een sloot reed en dat in de pers breed werd uitgemeten, werd ik door verschillende mensen aangesproken ‘Dat was jij toch niet?'”)

Return to SC Hoevelaken

In 2026, Timmer joined the coaching staff of his hometown club SC Hoevelaken as goalkeeper coach of the senior first team. On 3 October 2026, at the age of 45, he unexpectedly returned to competitive first-team football during a league match against Valleivogels from Scherpenzeel.

Timmer entered the match after 16 minutes following a red card for starting goalkeeper Gijs Leebeek. With SC Hoevelaken reduced to ten men for the remainder of the match, Timmer made several saves and helped his side secure a 2–1 victory. The appearance marked his return to first-team football more than a decade after the end of his previous playing career.

The victory was notable as Valleivogels had entered the season with championship ambitions, while Hoevelaken played the majority of the match with ten players. Timmer’s performance after his unexpected introduction contributed to Hoevelaken retaining the three points.

== Personal life ==
Following his retirement from professional football, Timmer became a coach for SC Hoevelaken. In 2019, Timmer modeled for Roots Fashion in Amersfoort.
