= Wergea =

Warga Wergea
- Village
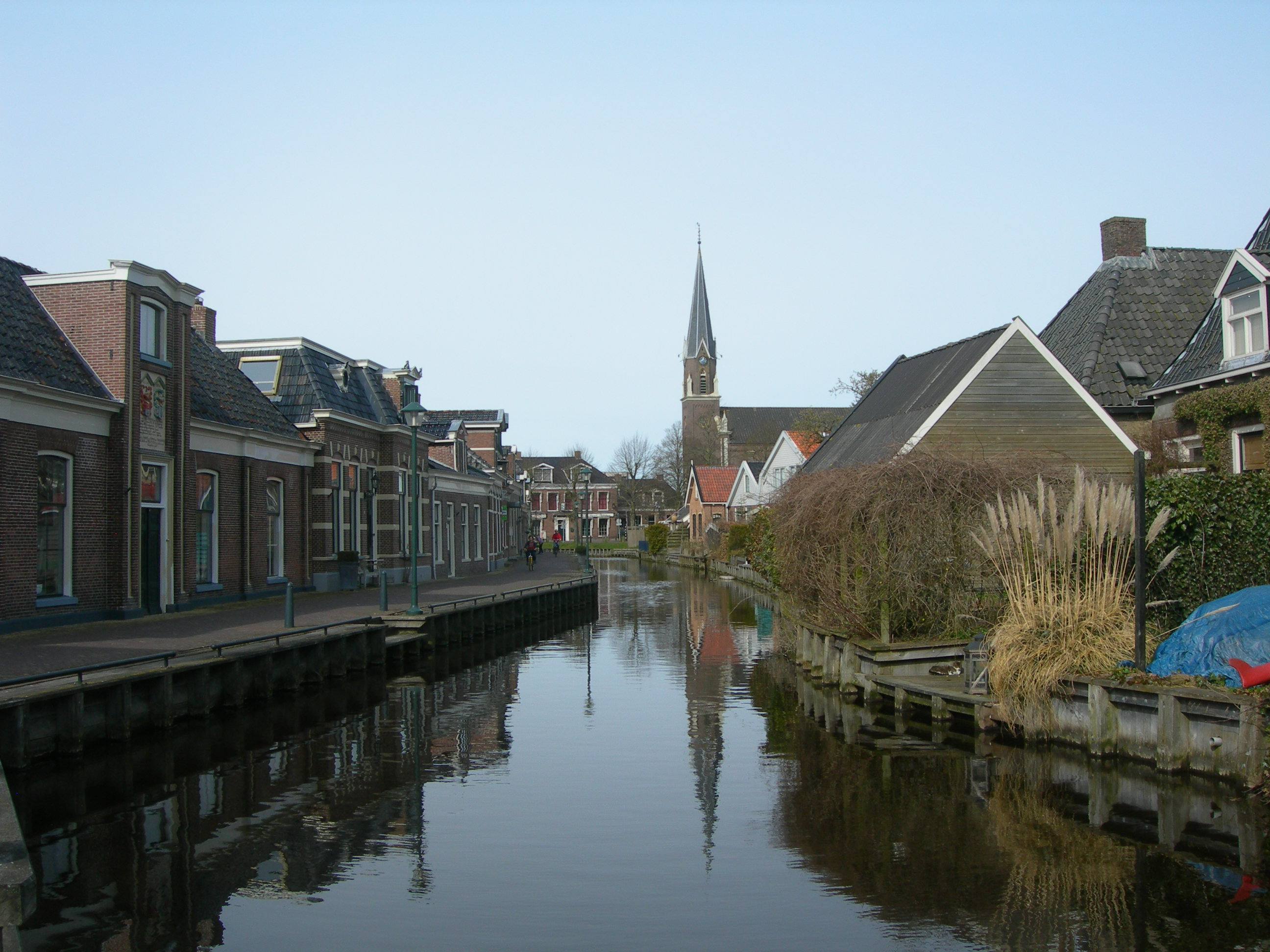
- Village view

- Flag Coat of arms

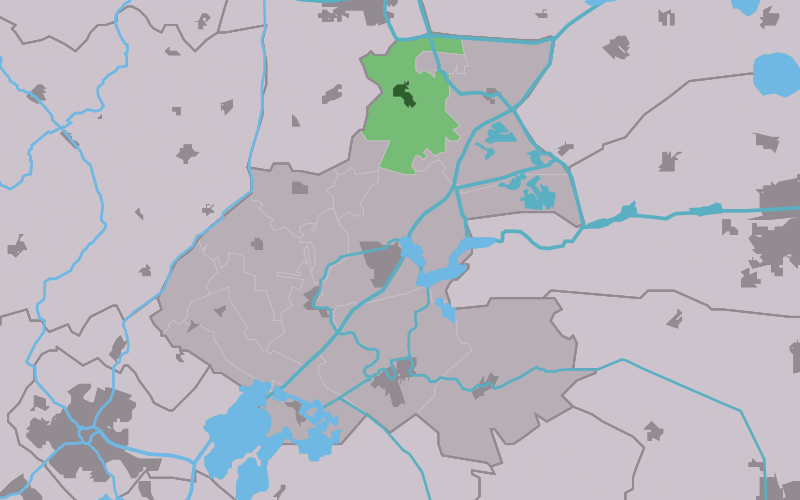
- Location in the former Boarnsterhim municipality

- Location in the Netherlands Warga (Netherlands)
- Country: Netherlands
- Province: Friesland
- Municipality: Leeuwarden

Area
  - Total: 13.01 km^{2} (5.02 sq mi)
- Elevation: 0.1 m (0.33 ft)

Population (2021)
  - Total: 1,830
  - Density: 141/km^{2} (364/sq mi)
- Time zone: UTC+1 (CET)
  - Summer (DST): UTC+2 (CEST)
- Postal code: 9005
- Dialing code: 058

Wergea (Dutch: Warga) is a village in Leeuwarden municipality in the province of Friesland, the Netherlands. It had a population of around 1,560 in January 2017.

There are two windmills in the village, De Hempenserpoldermolen and a paaltjasker.

== History ==
=== Early habitation ===
Around year 0, several archeological finds yielded proof of permanent residency in the form of farm remnants. These residents probably originated from surrounding communities and were pushed towards new land due to overpopulation. The first residents established themselves on terps.

From the 3rd-8th CE century the terps were abandoned due to unknown reasons, possibly being connected to the depositing of marine clay by the sea which greatly diminished the arability of the land. After the sea level subsided, the area became suitable for human habitation again.

=== Recorded history of the village ===
The village was first mentioned in 944 as Wartengahe. The complete etymology is unknown, though the name partially derives from a prefix for fishing related practices. Wergea was situated on a waterway connecting the north and south of Friesland. This yielded the village to develop due to trade. Most notably, the village enacted tariffs on goods at every one of its many bridges. Today, there are only two bridges still crossing said waterway.

In 1664, the widow's court was founded by Vrouck van Popma for poor widows. The wooden buildings in the village were rebuilt in 1864.

The polder mill De Hempenserpoldermolen was built in 1863. In 1955, a pumping station was opened and the windmill became obsolete. The then owner had plans to demolish the building, however the windmill was transferred to the water board for 2 Dutch guilders. In 1988, the mill was restored.

In 1840, Wergea was home to 873 people. The Roman Catholic St. Martinus Church was built between 1860 and 1862. In 1860, the terp was excavated. In 1886, the first cooperative dairy factory of the Netherlands opened in Wergea. The company is nowadays - after many mergers - known as FrieslandCampina, however the Wergea factory closed in 1994.

Before 2014, Wergea was part of Boarnsterhim municipality and before 1984 it belonged to Idaarderadeel.

== Notable people ==
- Annie van der Meer (1928–2004), speed skater
- Minne Hoekstra (1884–1941), speed skater, winner of the first organized Elfstedentocht

== Gallery ==
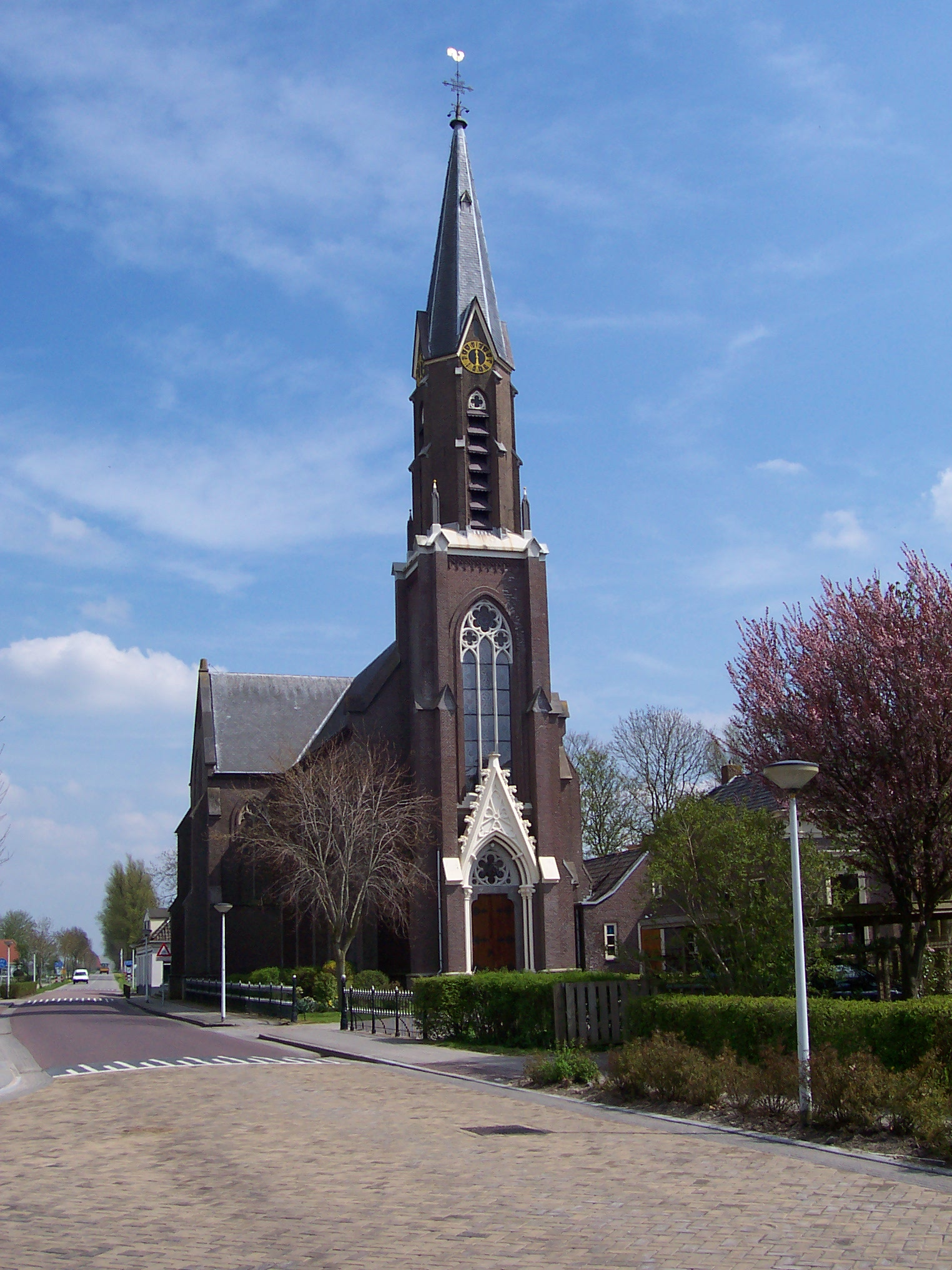
St Martin's Church

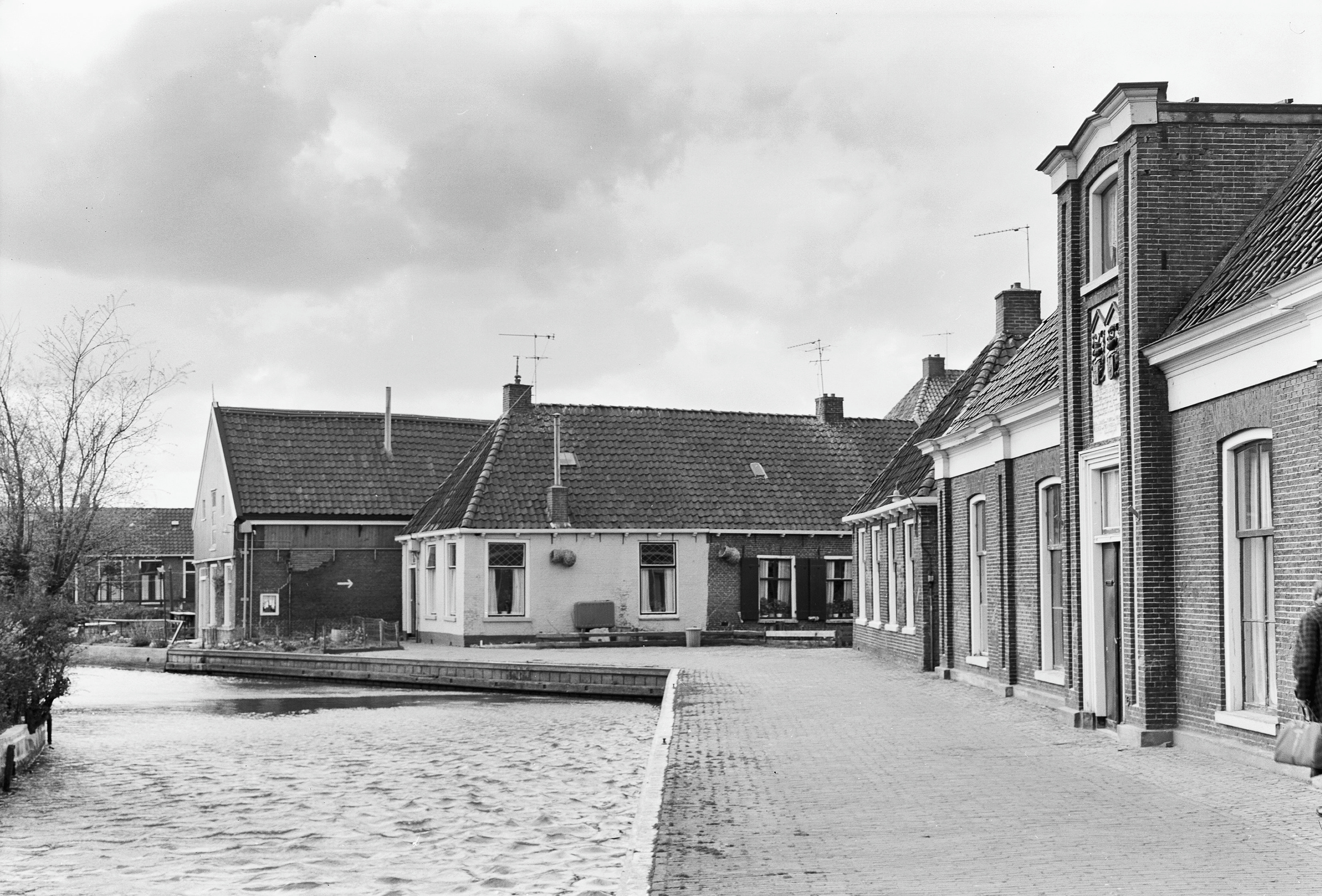
Widow's court

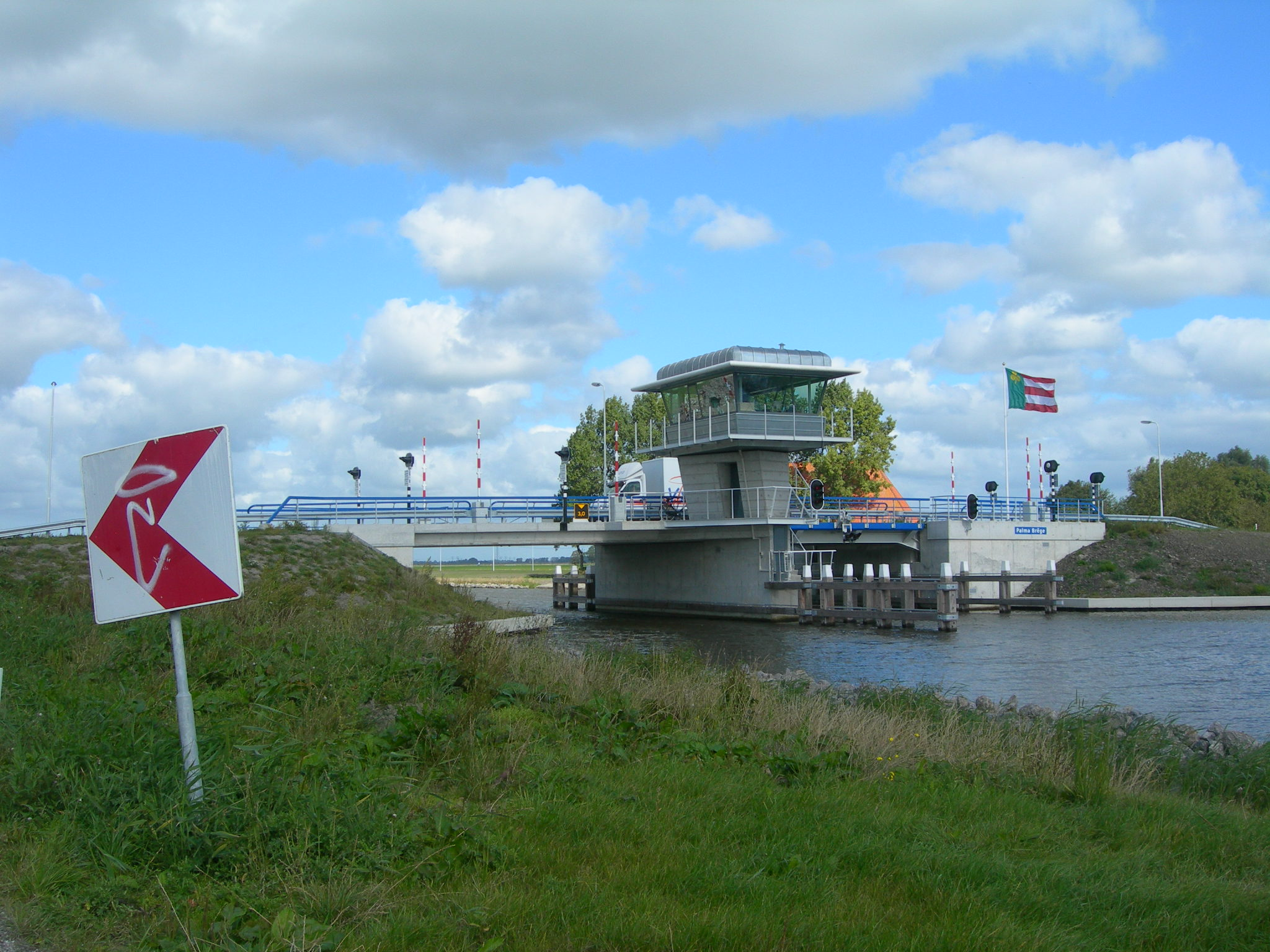
Bridge near Wergea

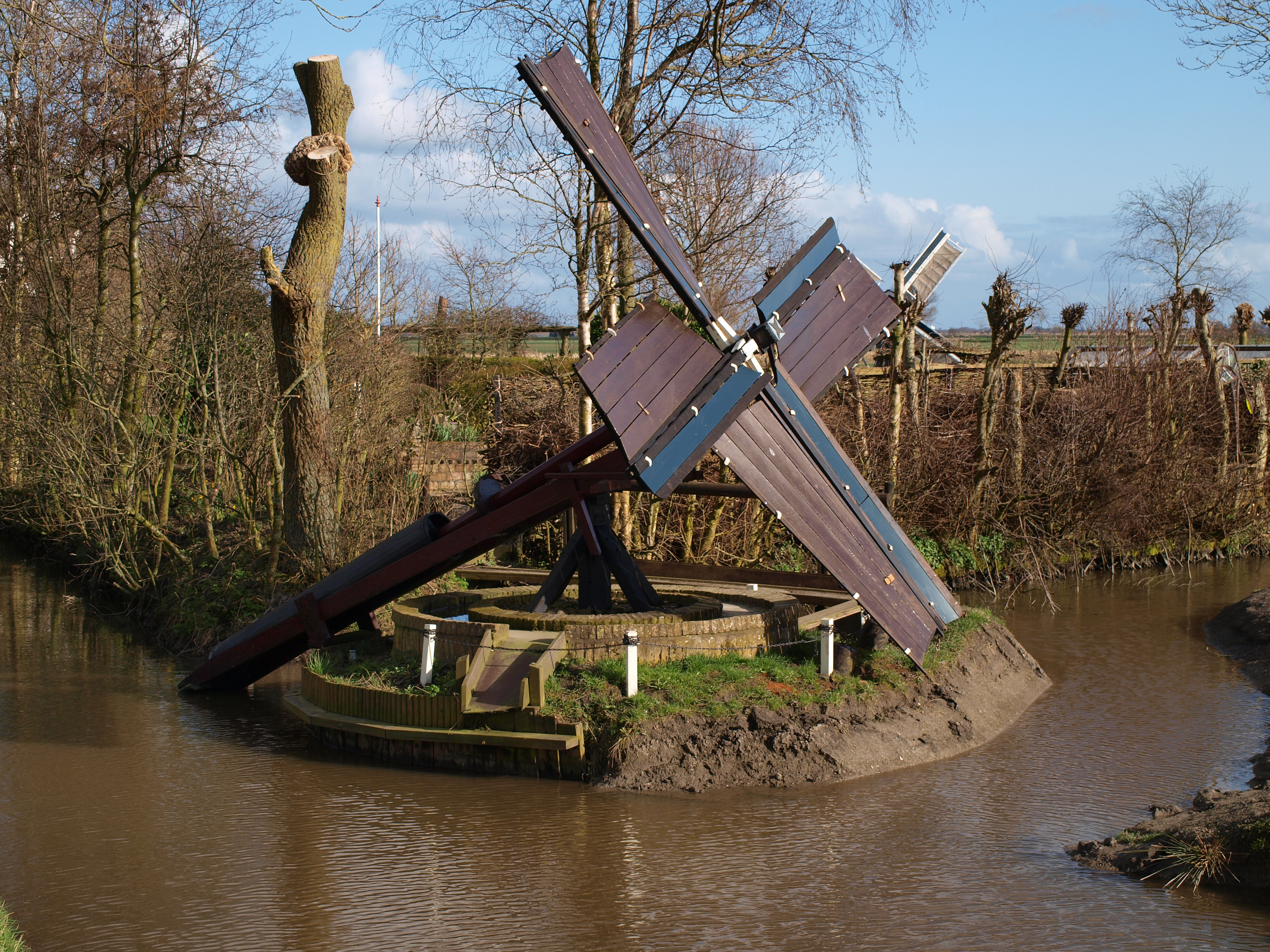
Tjasker
