= Amersfoort Schothorst railway station =

Railway station in Amersfoort, Netherlands

Amersfoort Schothorst
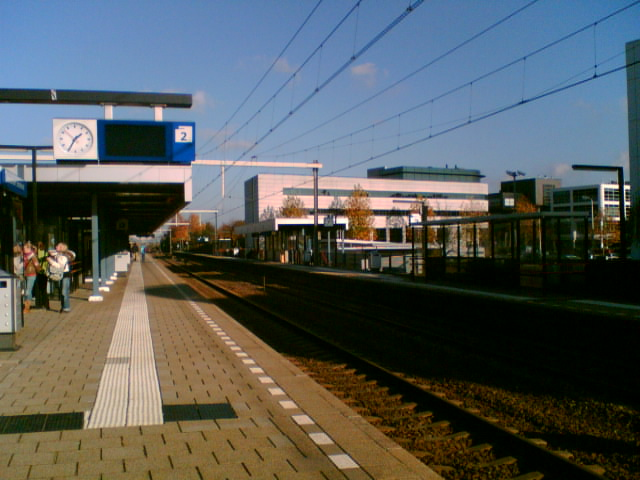

General information
- Location: Netherlands
- Coordinates: 52°10′29″N 5°24′13″E
- Line: Utrecht–Kampen railway

History
- Opened: 1987

Services
Preceding station	Nederlandse Spoorwegen	Following station
Amersfoort Centraal towards Breda	NS Intercity Direct 1800	Terminus
Amersfoort Centraal towards Utrecht Centraal	NS Sprinter 5600	Amersfoort Vathorst towards Zwolle
Amersfoort Centraal towards Amsterdam Centraal	NS Sprinter 5800	Amersfoort Vathorst Terminus
Location
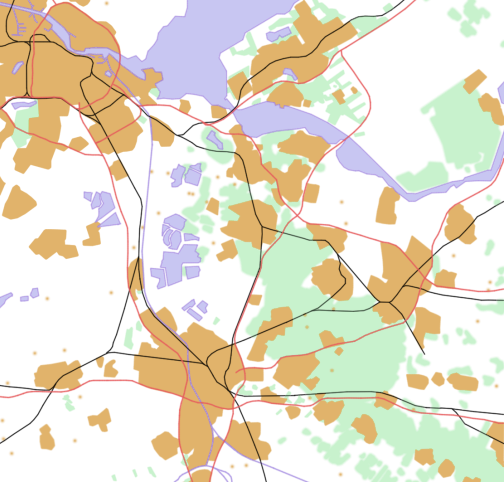
- Location within Northeastern Randstad

Amersfoort Schothorst is a railway station on the Utrecht–Kampen railway between Amersfoort and Zwolle. It is located in north Amersfoort, Netherlands. The station is operated by Nederlandse Spoorwegen (NS).

== History ==
The station opened in 1987 as a suburban complement to the main Amersfoort railway station. The station serves the suburban areas of Schothorst, Zielhorst, Liendert and Rustenburg and the industrial area of De Hoef.

The station used to be the terminus for trains originating from the wide Amsterdam region, such as Hoofddorp, Alkmaar and Amsterdam Centraal; a third track was constructed enabling these services in 1997. When a second suburban station, Amersfoort Vathorst opened to the north of Schothorst in May 2006, regional services (Sprinters) terminating in Vathorst. The spare third track has been used, as of December 2007, as the terminus for Intercity trains originating from Rotterdam Centraal.

== Train services ==
As of 11 December 2016, the following train services call at this station:

- Express services:
  - Intercity: Schiphol - Hilversum - Amersfoort Schothorst
  - Intercity: The Hague - Utrecht - Amersfoort Schothorst
- Local services:
  - Sprinter: Utrecht - Amersfoort - Zwolle
  - Sprinter: Hoofddorp - Amsterdam - Hilversum - Amersfoort Vathorst
