= Harderwijk railway station =

Railway station in Harderwijk, Netherlands

Harderwijk
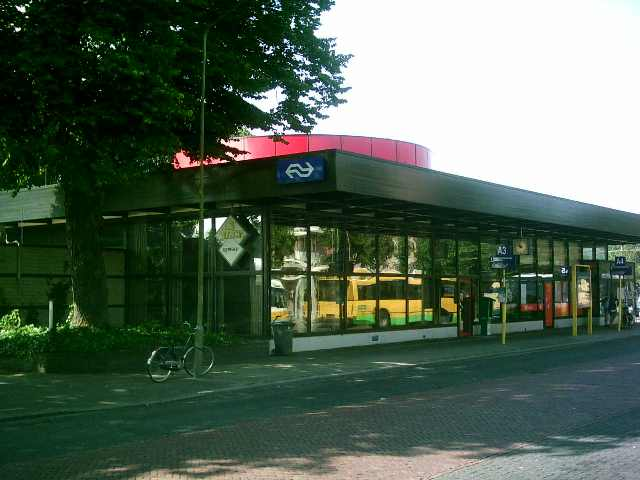
- Station Harderwijk 2004

General information
- Location: Netherlands
- Coordinates: 52°20′15″N 5°37′11″E
- Line: Utrecht–Kampen railway

Other information
- Station code: Hd

History
- Opened: 1863

Services
| Preceding station | Nederlandse Spoorwegen | Following station |
|---|---|---|
| Ermelo towards Utrecht Centraal | NS Sprinter 5600 | Nunspeet towards Zwolle |
Location
- Location within Netherlands

Harderwijk railway station is located in Harderwijk, Netherlands. The station was opened on 20 August 1863 and is located on the Amersfoort–Zwolle section of the Utrecht–Kampen railway (Centraalspoorweg). The services are operated by Nederlandse Spoorwegen.

== Train services ==
The following services currently call at Harderwijk:

| Route | Service type | Notes |
|---|---|---|
| Utrecht – Amersfoort – Harderwijk – Zwolle | Local ("Sprinter") | 2x per hour |

=== Bus services ===
| Line | Route | Operator | Notes |
|---|---|---|---|
| 1 | Harderwijk Station → Centrum → Zeebuurt → Frankrijk → Stadsdennen → Wittenhagen → Veldkamp → Harderwijk Station | Syntus Gelderland | On evenings and Sundays, this bus only operates if called one hour before its supposed departure ("belbus"). |
| 101 | Harderwijk - Ermelo - Putten - Nijkerk - Nijkerkerveen - Hooglanderveen - Amersfoort Schothorst | Syntus Gelderland | On evenings and Sundays, one extra bus operates every hour within Harderwijk if called one hour before its supposed departure ("belbus"). |
| 104 | Harderwijk - Leuvenum - Staverden - Elspeet - Uddel - Nieuw-Milligen - Hoog-Soeren - Apeldoorn | Syntus Gelderland | Not on evenings. On weekends, this bus only operates between Harderwijk and Elspeet, but only if called one hour before its supposed departure ("belbus"). |
| 111 | Harderwijk - Hierden - Hulshorst - Nunspeet | Syntus Gelderland | On evenings, this bus only operates if called one hour before its supposed departure ("belbus"). |
| 142 | Harderwijk - Harderhaven - Zeewolde - Nijkerk | OV Regio IJsselmond | Not on evenings and weekends. |
| 144 | Harderwijk - Harderhaven - Zeewolde | OV Regio IJsselmond | Only on evenings and weekends. |
| 147 | Harderwijk - Harderhaven - Biddinghuizen - Dronten | OV Regio IJsselmond | |
| 148 | Lelystad - Harderhaven - Harderwijk | OV Regio IJsselmond | |
| 159 | Harderwijk - Harderhaven - Zeewolde - Almere Hout - Almere Stad | OV Regio IJsselmond | Not on evenings and weekends. Closed-door within Almere Stad (i.e. no boarding and exiting allowed for passengers wanting to travel only within Almere Stad). |
| 205 | Barneveld - Voorthuizen - Huinen - Putten - Ermelo - Harderwijk | Syntus Gelderland | |
| 247 | Harderwijk - Harderhaven - Biddinghuizen Walibi Holland | Gebo Tours (on very busy days, OV Regio IJsselmond provides a few extra buses/runs) | Operates only during opening days/times of Walibi Holland. |
| 513 | Harderwijk Station - Harderwijk Bouw en Infrapark - Ermelo | Syntus Gelderland | Not on evenings and weekends. |
| 620 | Harderwijk - Ermelo - Putten - Nijkerk - Amersfoort GSG Arnhemseweg | Van de Broek/Van Mil Tours | 1 run during both rush hours. |
| 674 | (Harderwijk - Ermelo -) Putten - Nijkerk - Amersfoort Hoornbeeck/Van Lodenstein | Van de Broek/Van Mil Tours | Rush hours only. Two buses run in both directions, both with different destinations: one to/from Harderwijk, one to/from Putten. |
