= Round House (Nunspeet, Netherlands) =

Building in Nunspeet, Netherlands

Coordinates: 52.3599°N 5.8010°E

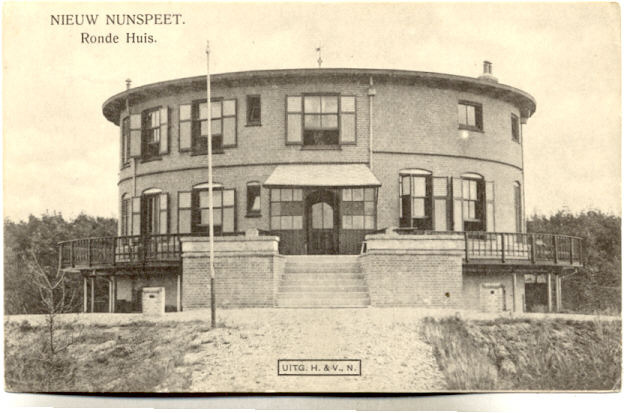
Postcard of the Round House

The Round House (Dutch: Ronde Huis) was a round villa in the Netherlands, located in the municipality of Nunspeet. It was demolished in 1967 but its traces remain visible in the landscape.

== History ==
=== Nieuw Nunspeet ===
In 1890 Frank van Vloten (1858–1930), from the Dutch patrician family Van Vloten, purchased the estate Groeneveld in Hulshorst, in the municipality of Nunspeet. He sold the property in 1891 to his wife Constance Lans and they finally moved into the property in 1893. In 1895 Frank van Vloten purchased land closer to the village of Nunspeet and together with his brother Willem van Vloten he founded the company Nieuw Nunspeet. In 1902 another 360-hectare patch of land was added to the company. In 1906 the first stone was laid of a round villa which would become known as Het Ronde Huis (The Round House).

=== House ===
The Round House had three floors and a flat roof. An entrance road circled around the house towards the main entrance on the second floor which had a balcony all around the house. The round inner gallery on the third floor received daylight through a couloured glass dome in the roof. After the establishment of the Round House the surroundings were transformed to a landscape park.

=== Estate ===
The estate included roughly the area between Nunspeet railway station and Vierhouten, with remains of the park still visible in the form of ponds surrounded with Rhododendron bushes and a Honey locust. Van vloten experimented with different forestry management methods and introduced several alien tree species and plants. Nowadays, the Nunspeet golf course is situated on part of the former estate.

=== Narrow gauge tramway ===
Frank van vloten constructed a 600 mm (1 ft 11 5/8 in) pony-drawn tramway from his estate to Nunspeet railway station. It was built in Decauville-style portable rail track. One surviving tram carriage was restored to working order at the Pony- en Motortram 't Joppe and now resides at the Stichting Rijssens Leemspoor heritage railway.

=== Death of Frank van Vloten ===
Frank van Vloten died in 1930. The estate was divided and sold. The house and its surroundings became now property of Staatsbosbeheer and started deteriorating, other parts of the estate were clearcut by a local forester.

== Second World War ==
During the Second World War the house was used as a labour camp of the Dutch Arbeitseinsatz. Nearby refugees hid in the forest in a shelter later to become known as the Verscholen Dorp (Hidden village). In 1944 a Rheinbote ballistic missile launchpad was constructed on the estate.

== Demise ==
After the war the former labour camp became a family resort for social weak families and from 1961 to 1966 it was a holiday camp. At the end of the sixties it was decided to demolish the house and camp.

== Conspiracy theories ==
Articles published in 1976 and 2006 speculated that Frank van Vloten organised orgies and occult rituals at the Round House. In 2011 a Dutch weblog published an even more extreme version of these rumours and the subject was debated on the Dutch FOK! forum, where several participants started an investigation. In 2012 a controversial book was published which stated that Frank van Vloten was a member of a Pan-Germanist cult and the publication attracted some media coverage. Two magazines, Skepter and G-Geschiedenis, put the theory in question in 2013, followed by two crime thrillers in 2014, loosely based on the rumours. A new non-fiction book was published on June 14, 2014 in which the conspiracy theories are dubbed a saga. There are absolutely no grounds to suspect Frank van Vloten as a pan-German occultist and a lot of written statements have proven that nothing out of the ordinary happened in the extraordinary house.
