= 't Harde railway station =

Railway station in the Netherlands

't Harde
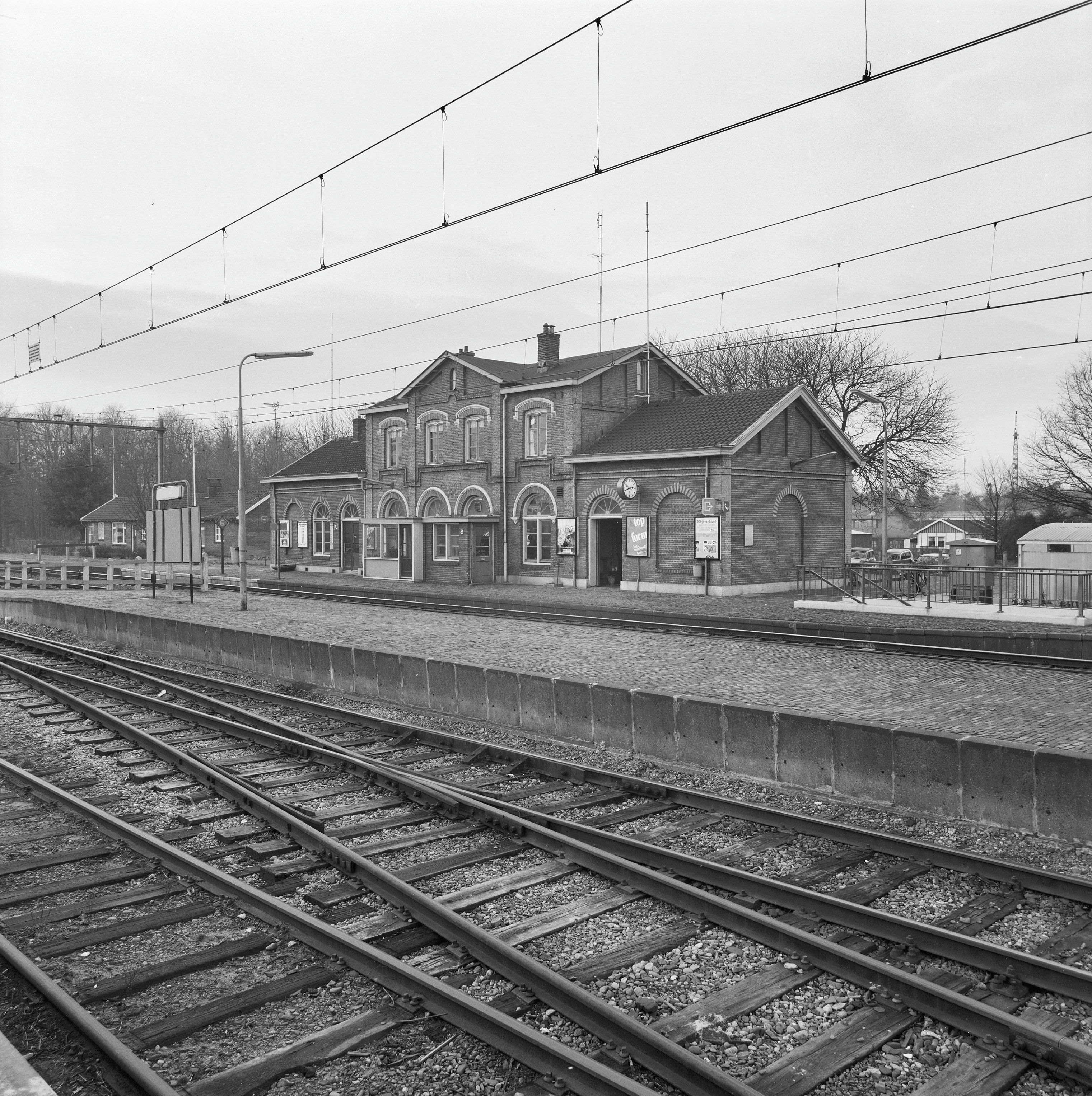
- Railway station in 1973

General information
- Location: Netherlands
- Coordinates: 52°24′32″N 5°53′35″E
- Line: Utrecht–Kampen railway

History
- Opened: 1863

Services
Preceding station	Nederlandse Spoorwegen	Following station
Nunspeet towards Utrecht Centraal	NS Sprinter 5600	Wezep towards Zwolle
Location
- Location within Netherlands

't Harde railway station is located in 't Harde, Netherlands. The station was opened on 20 August 1863 and is located on the Amersfoort–Zwolle section of the Utrecht–Kampen railway (Centraalspoorweg). The services are operated by Nederlandse Spoorwegen. Previously, the station was called Elburg-Epe (1863-1888), Elburg-Oldebroek(1888-1914) and Legerplaats Oldebroek (1914-1963).

== Train services ==
Route	Service type	Notes
Utrecht – Amersfoort – Harderwijk – Zwolle	Local ("Sprinter")	2x per hour

=== Bus services ===
Line	Route	Operator	Notes
514	Wezep - 't Loo - Oldebroek - Oosterwolde - Elburg - Hoge Enk - 't Harde	Syntus Gelderland	Mon-Fri during daytime hours only.
