= Wezep railway station =

Railway station in the Netherlands

Wezep
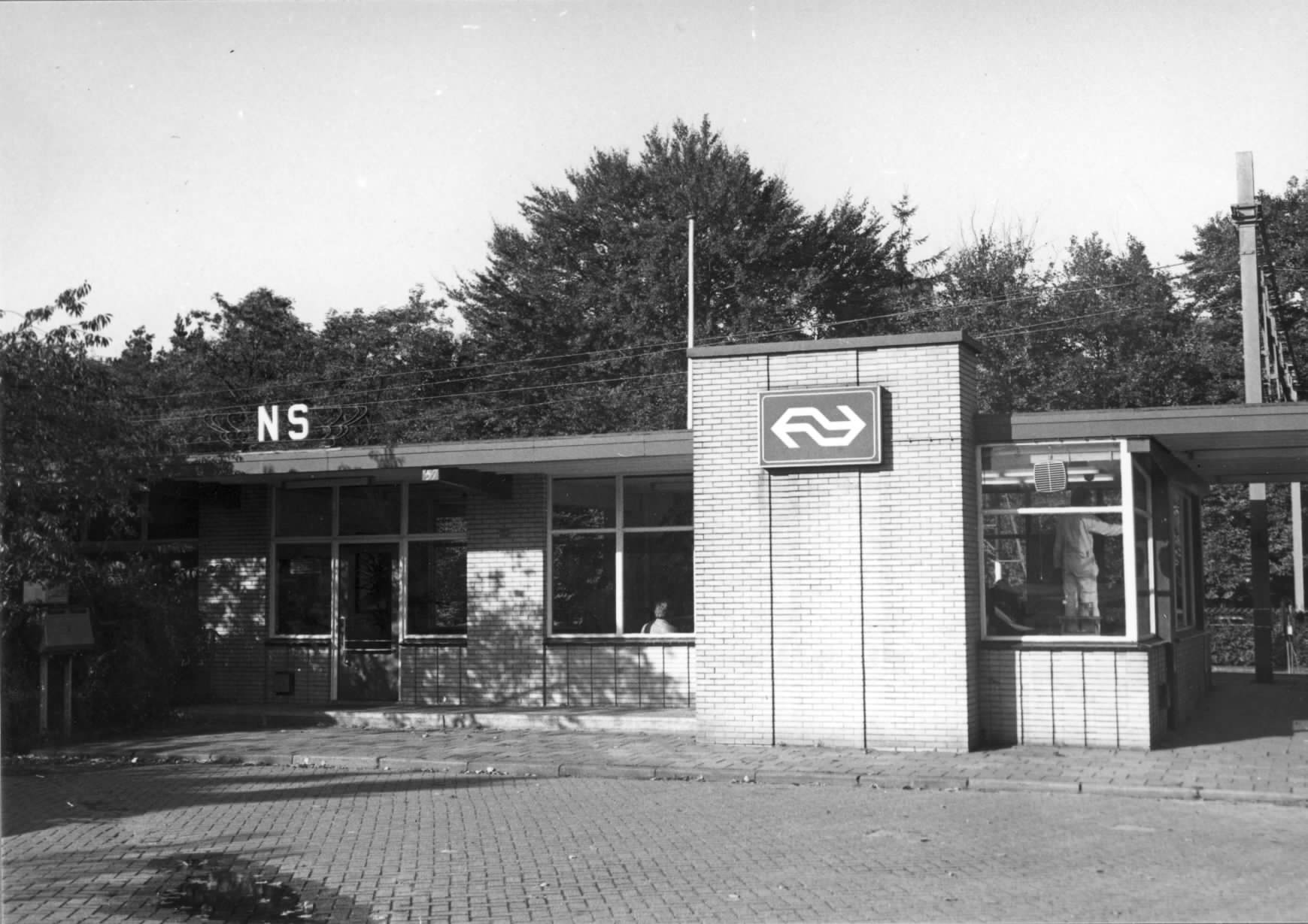
- The station in 1980 or 1981.

General information
- Location: Netherlands
- Coordinates: 52°27′13″N 6°0′8″E
- Line: Utrecht–Kampen railway

History
- Opened: 1863

Services
Preceding station	Nederlandse Spoorwegen	Following station
't Harde towards Utrecht Centraal	NS Sprinter 5600	Zwolle Terminus
Location
- Location within Netherlands

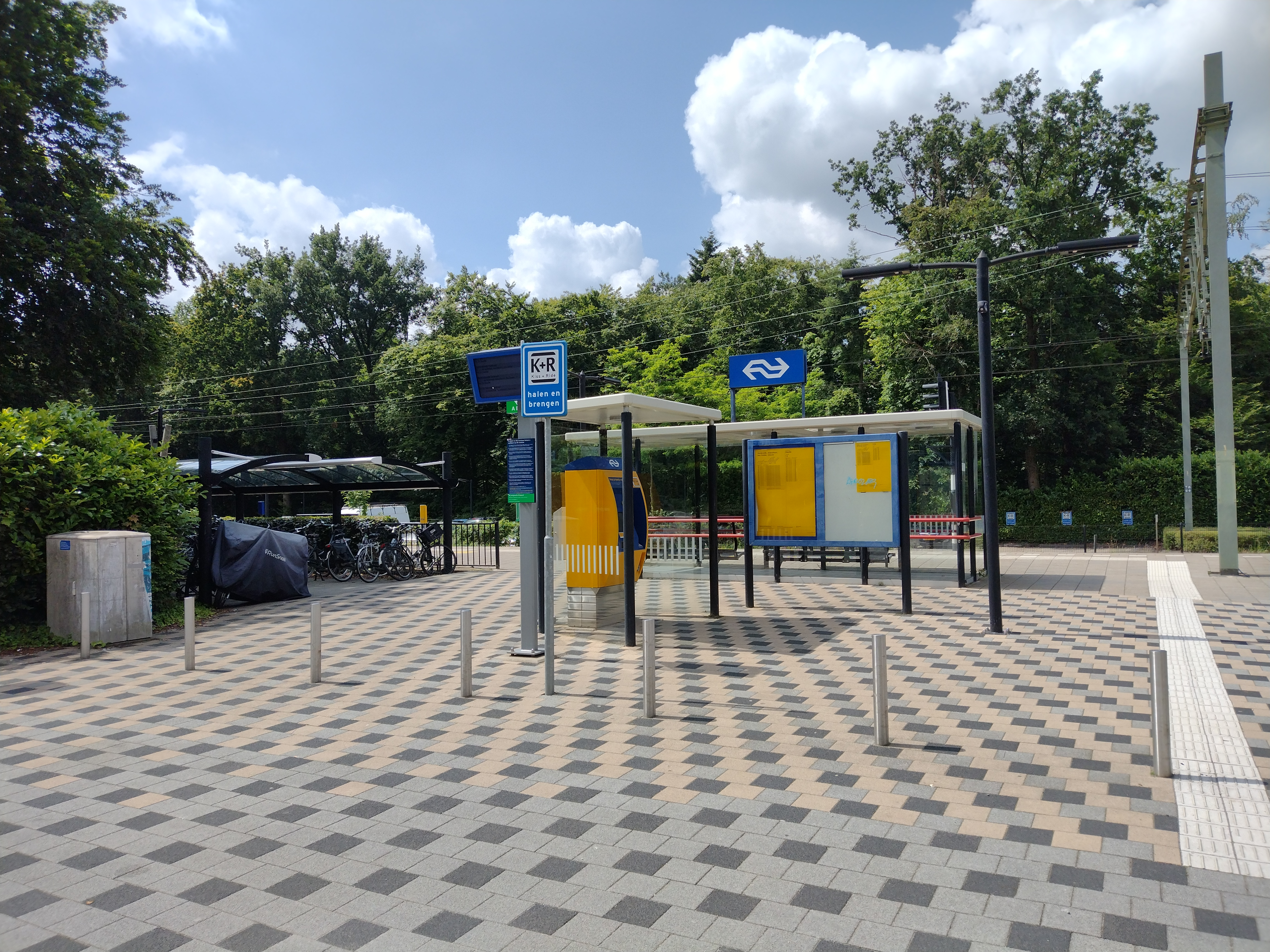
Wezep railway station in 2024

Wezep is a railway station located in Wezep, Netherlands. The station was opened in 1863 and is located on the Amersfoort–Zwolle section of the Utrecht–Kampen railway (Centraalspoorweg). The train services are operated by Nederlandse Spoorwegen.

== Train services ==
Route	Service type	Notes
Utrecht – Amersfoort – Harderwijk – Zwolle	Local ("Sprinter")	2x per hour

=== Bus services ===
Line	Route	Operator	Notes
502	Vorchten - Veessen - Heerde - Wezep	Rrreis	Not on evenings and Sundays. On Saturdays, this bus only operates between 9:30-12:00 and 15:00-17:30.
514	Wezep - 't Loo - Oldebroek - Oosterwolde - Elburg - Hoge Enk - 't Harde	Rrreis	Mon-Fri during daytime hours only.
