= Putten railway station =

Railway station in the Netherlands

Putten
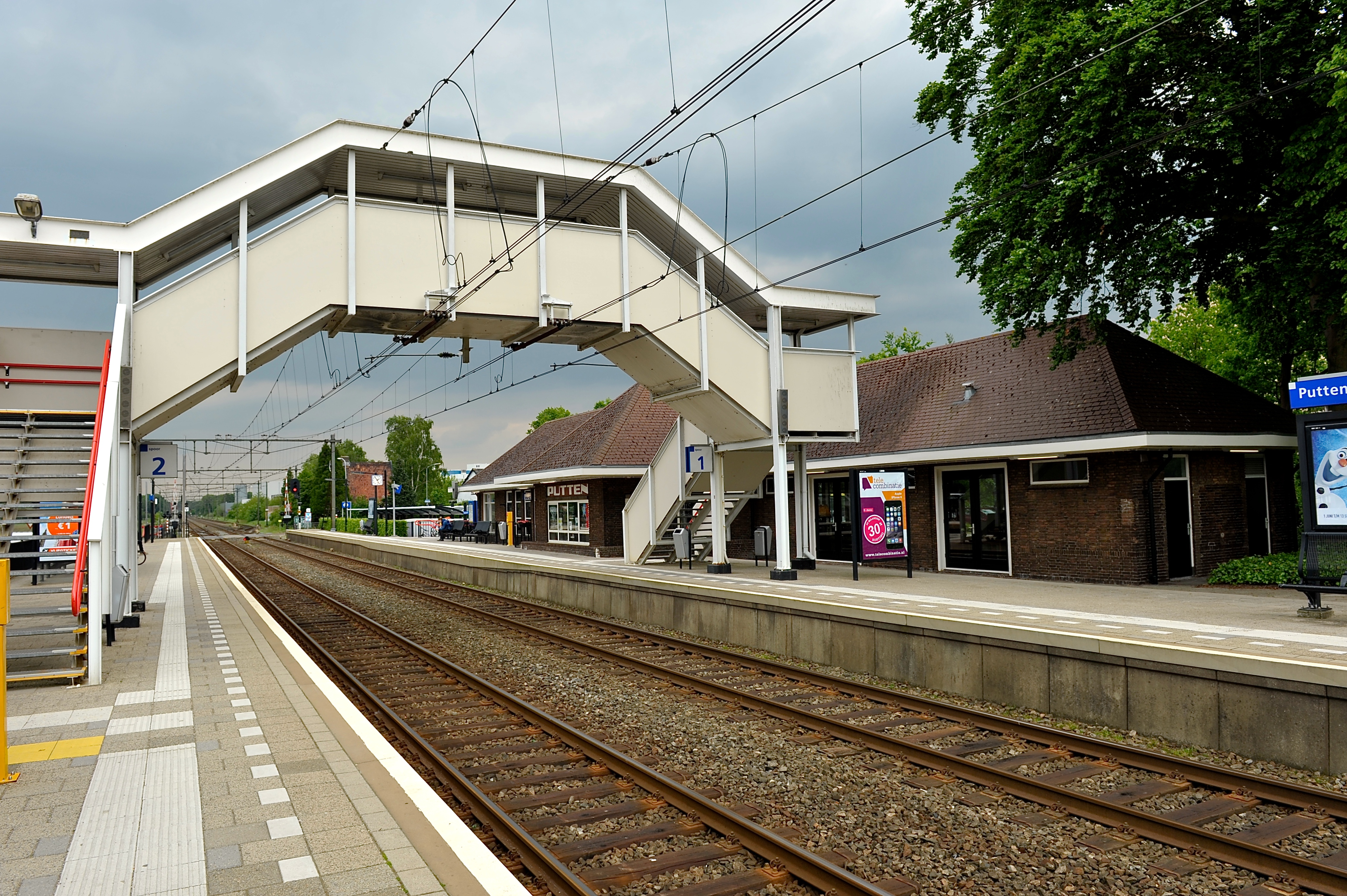
- Putten railway station in 2015

General information
- Location: Netherlands
- Coordinates: 52°15′55″N 5°34′34″E
- Line: Utrecht–Kampen railway

History
- Opened: 1863

Services
Preceding station	Nederlandse Spoorwegen	Following station
Nijkerk towards Utrecht Centraal	NS Sprinter 5600	Ermelo towards Zwolle
Location
- Location within Netherlands

Putten is a railway station located in Putten, Netherlands. The station was opened on 20 August 1863 and is located on the Amersfoort–Zwolle section of the Utrecht–Kampen railway (Centraalspoorweg). The station is operated by Nederlandse Spoorwegen.

== Train services ==
The following services call at Putten:

Route	Service type	Notes
Utrecht - Amersfoort - Harderwijk - Zwolle	Local ("Sprinter")	2x per hour

== Bus services ==
Line	Route	Operator	Notes
107	Ede - Wekerom - Harskamp - Stroe - Wittenberg - Garderen - Koudhoorn - Putten	Syntus Gelderland	
