= Amersfoort Vathorst railway station =

Railway station in Amersfoort, Netherlands

Amersfoort Vathorst
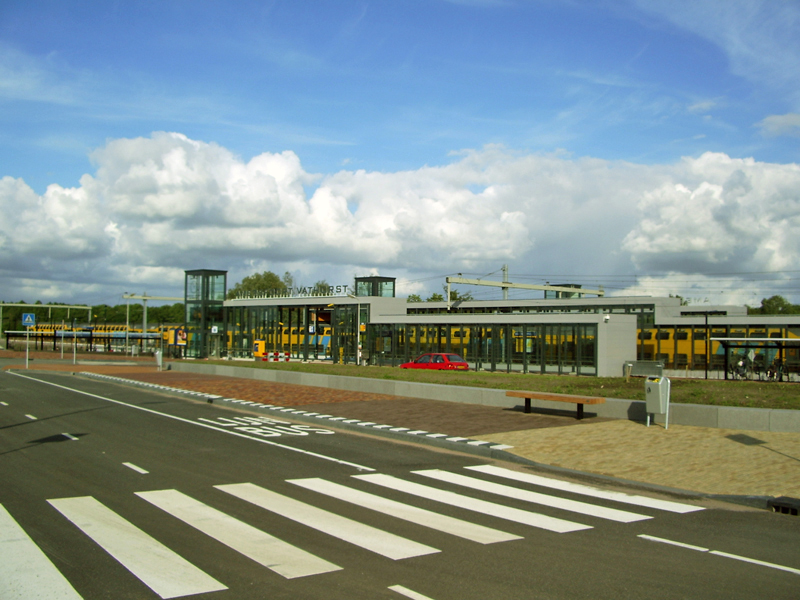

General information
- Location: Netherlands
- Coordinates: 52°11′33″N 5°26′1″E
- Line: Utrecht–Kampen railway

History
- Opened: 28 May 2006

Services
Preceding station	Nederlandse Spoorwegen	Following station
Amersfoort Schothorst towards Utrecht Centraal	NS Sprinter 5600	Nijkerk towards Zwolle
Amersfoort Schothorst towards Amsterdam Centraal	NS Sprinter 5800	Terminus
Location
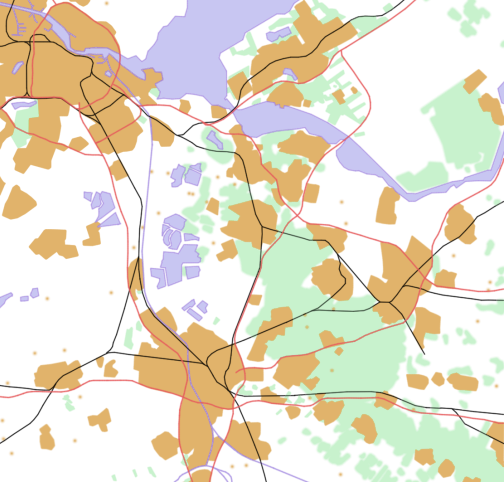
- Location within Northeastern Randstad

Amersfoort Vathorst is a railway station on the Utrecht–Kampen railway between Amersfoort and Zwolle. It is located in north Amersfoort, Netherlands. The station is operated by the Nederlandse Spoorwegen (NS). The station opened 28 May 2006. The station has 3 tracks, 1 of which is for terminating trains from the Amersfoort direction. It is located in the area of the Vathorst and Hooglanderveen estates, which are still being built up.

== Train services ==
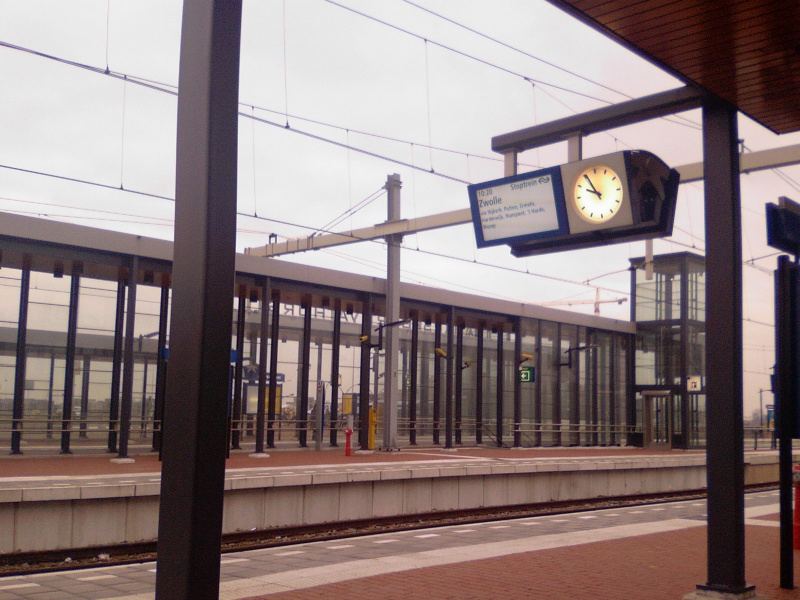
Platform 3 of the station

The following train services call at Amersfoort Vathorst:

Route	Service type	Notes
Utrecht - Amersfoort - Zwolle	Local ("Sprinter")	2x per hour
Hoofddorp - Amsterdam - Hilversum - Amersfoort Vathorst	Local ("Sprinter")	2x per hour

== Bus services ==
Line	Route	Operator	Notes
3	Amersfoort Centraal Station - De Koppel - Meander MC - Hoogland-West - Calveen - Vathorst	Syntus Utrecht	
5	Amersfoort Centraal Station - Centrum - Kruiskamp - Schothorst Station - Zielhorst-Oost - Vathorst	Syntus Utrecht	
7	Amersfoort Centraal Station - De Koppel - Schothorst - Zielhorst-West - Vathorst	Syntus Utrecht	
160	Almere Stad - Almere Hout - Zeewolde De Eemhof - Amersfoort Vathorst	Keolis Nederland (under contract of OV Regio IJsselmond)	Even though Keolis Nederland operates the line, buses with Syntus Overijssel branding are being used. Tariffs of OV Regio IJsselmond apply on this line.
203	Amersfoort Vathorst - Amersfoort Zielhorst-Oost - Amersfoort Schothorst - Amersfoort Centrum - Amersfoort Leusderkwartier - Soesterberg P+R - Utrecht Science Park - Utrecht Rijnsweerd	Pouw Vervoer	Mon-Fri during daytime hours only.
572	Soest - Baarn - Bunschoten - Spakenburg - Bunschoten - Zevenhuizen - Amersfoort - Hooglanderveen - Amersfoort Vathorst	Syntus Utrecht	Mon-Sat during daytime hours only.
N03	Amersfoort Centraal Station - De Koppel - Meander MC - Hoogland-West - Calveen - Vathorst	Pouw Vervoer	Friday and Saturday late nights (between midnight and 5 AM) only.
