= Kampen railway station =

Railway station in the Netherlands

Kampen
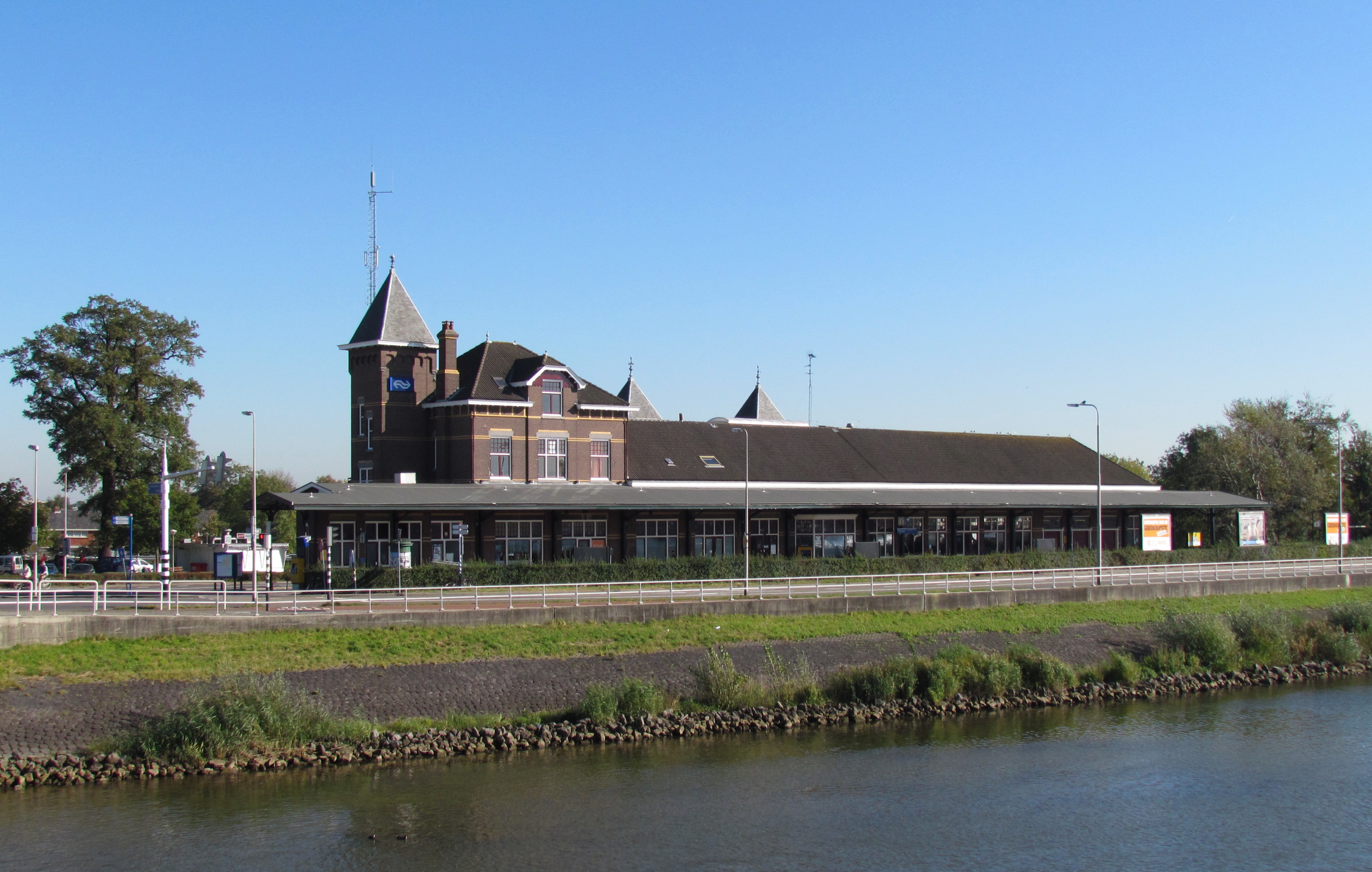
- Kampen Station seen from the IJssel bridge

General information
- Location: Netherlands
- Coordinates: 52°33′35″N 5°55′16″E
- Line: Utrecht–Kampen railway

History
- Opened: 10 May 1865

Services
| Preceding station | Keolis Nederland | Following station |
|---|---|---|
| Terminus | Sprinter 8500 | Zwolle Stadshagen towards Zwolle |
Location
- Location within Netherlands

Kampen is a terminus railway station located in Kampen, Netherlands. The station was opened on 10 May 1865 and is located on the Kamperlijntje, which is the Zwolle-Kampen section of the Utrecht–Kampen railway. The train service is operated by Nederlandse Spoorwegen. A 2005 survey showed approximately 5,064 people use this station per day.

Kampen now has two railway stations, since on 9 December 2012 the Hanzelijn was opened, creating a rail link between Lelystad and Zwolle via Dronten and Kampen. A new railway station Kampen Zuid connects Kampen with Dronten, Lelystad, Almere and Amsterdam to the west, and Zwolle to the east.

The old line from Kampen to Zwolle is currently being transformed into a light rail service, with an additional stop in northern Zwolle and a higher frequency (3x per hour). The plan to do so was abandoned when the call for bids failed twice; however the province of Overijssel and NS agreed in 2013 to maintain the 2x per hour diesel service awaiting new decisions on the line's future. In summer 2017, Syntus agreed to take over as operator and began the line's electrification.

There is currently a half-hourly service between Kampen and Zwolle on the old line. Services from the new Kampen Zuid are giving the town an additional, improved rail service with 2 stopping trains in each direction.

== Bus services ==
Bus Services 11, 12, 74, 141, 143, 506, 682, 683 and 684 stop at the bus station opposite the station exit.
