= 't Harde =

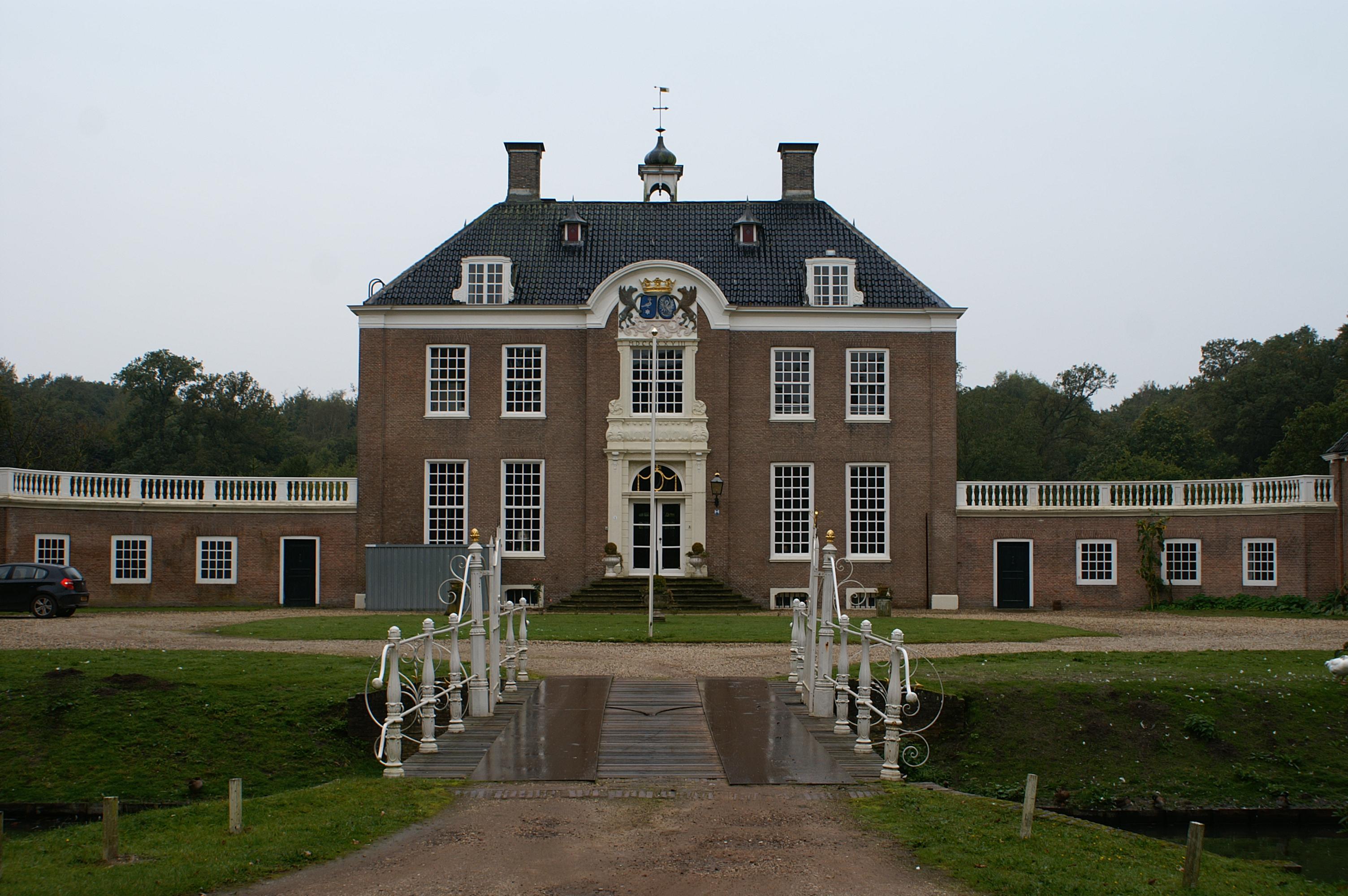
- Estate Zwaluwenburg

- Location within Gelderland Location within Netherlands
- Coordinates: 52°24′55″N 5°52′51″E
- Country: Netherlands
- Province: Gelderland
- Municipality: Elburg

Population (Nov. 2017)
  - Total: 6,685
- Time zone: UTC+1 (CET)
  - Summer (DST): UTC+2 (CEST)

't Harde is a village in the Dutch province of Gelderland. It is situated about 6 km southeast of Elburg, on the edge of the Veluwe forest. It has a train station with connections to Zwolle and Amersfoort. The village's population is approximately 6,685 people.

== History ==
't Harde is a relatively young village. The village is called 't Harde because it was built on a patch of solid ground in the middle of a swamp. In Dutch, hard has the same meaning as "hard" in English; as in: hard surface. After a military base was established near the village, the village expanded. 't Harde even got a swimming pool in 1953, which was very modern for that time. The pool was also used as a water supply to extinguish any fires that occurred in the vicinity of the village. In 1970, the swimming pool drew national attention, as local youths demonstrated for it be to be opened on Sundays, clashing with police.

Between 1961 and 1992, the local army base had a depository for U.S. tactical nuclear weapons.

== Transportation ==
Railway Station: 't Harde

== Two municipalities ==
't Harde was originally split between the two municipalities of Doornspijk and Oldebroek. In 1974, when Doornspijk was annexed by Elburg, the whole village of 't Harde also became part of Elburg.

== Fire ==
On 18 June 1970, there was a big fire in the forest near 't Harde. The fire approached the village and three buildings were burned. The fire's path changed when it reached the village.

== Districts ==
These are some districts in 't Harde:

- De Koekoek
- 't Spoor
- Centrum
- Oldebroeker Nieuwbouw
- Bungalowpark

== Sports ==
't Harde has a football club called SV 't Harde. There is also a swimming club: De Hokseberg.

== Famous residents ==
- Martin Bril (author, deceased)
