= Nijkerk railway station =

Railway station in the Netherlands

Nijkerk
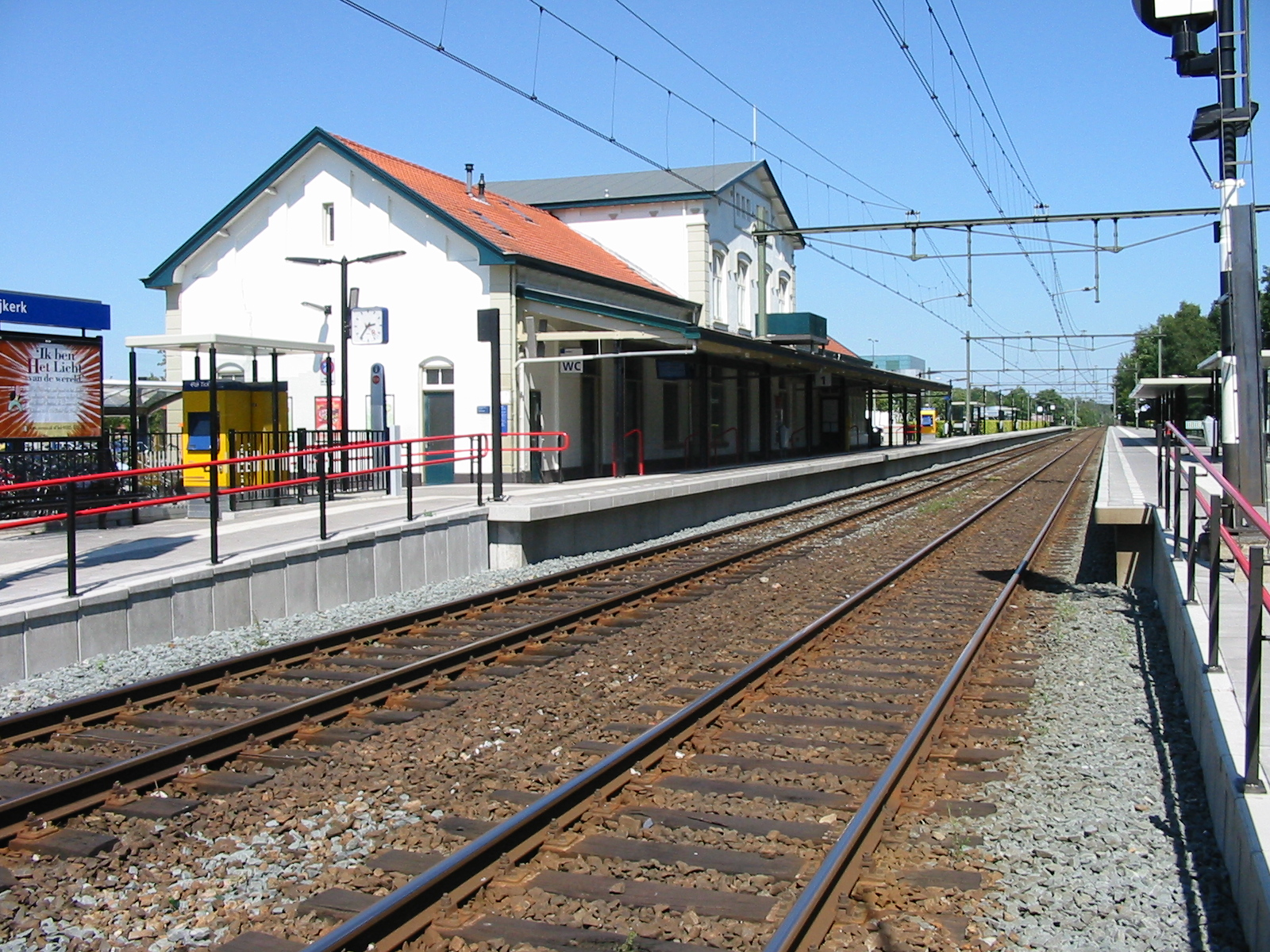
- Station house and its two tracks

General information
- Location: Netherlands
- Coordinates: 52°13′19″N 5°29′36″E
- Line: Utrecht–Kampen railway

History
- Opened: 1863

Services
Preceding station	Nederlandse Spoorwegen	Following station
Amersfoort Vathorst towards Utrecht Centraal	NS Sprinter 5600	Putten towards Zwolle
Location
- Location within Netherlands

Nijkerk is a railway station located in Nijkerk, Netherlands. The station was opened on 20 August 1863 and is located on the Utrecht–Kampen railway (Centraalspoorweg). The services are operated by Nederlandse Spoorwegen. From 1903, Nijkerk was also the northern terminus of the Nijkerk–Ede-Wageningen railway. The section between Nijkerk and Barneveld was closed and demolished in 1937.

== Train services ==
The following train services call at Nijkerk:

Route	Service type	Notes
Utrecht - Amersfoort - Harderwijk - Zwolle	Local ("Sprinter")	2x per hour

== Bus services ==
Line	Route	Operator	Notes
101	Harderwijk - Ermelo - Putten - Nijkerk - Nijkerkerveen - Hooglanderveen - Amersfoort Schothorst	Syntus Gelderland	
142	Harderwijk - Harderhaven - Zeewolde - Nijkerk	OV Regio IJsselmond	Mon-Fri during daytime hours only.
503	Eemdijk - Bunschoten - Spakenburg - Nijkerk	Syntus Utrecht	Mon-Fri during daytime hours only, although there is no AM peak service.
509	Barneveld - Achterveld - Leusden - Stoutenburg - Hoevelaken - Nijkerkerveen - Nijkerk	Syntus Gelderland	Mon-Sun during daytime hours only. On Sundays, it does not run between Leusden en Nijkerk.
603	Eemdijk → Bunschoten - Spakenburg - Nijkerk	Pouw Vervoer	Mon-Fri rush hours only; on Wednesdays and Saturdays, the PM rush hour runs are replaced by runs around noon.
687	Barneveld - Appel - Driedorp - Nijkerk	Noot	Mon-Fri rush hours only, with one extra run around noon.
