= Kamperlijntje =

Dutch railway

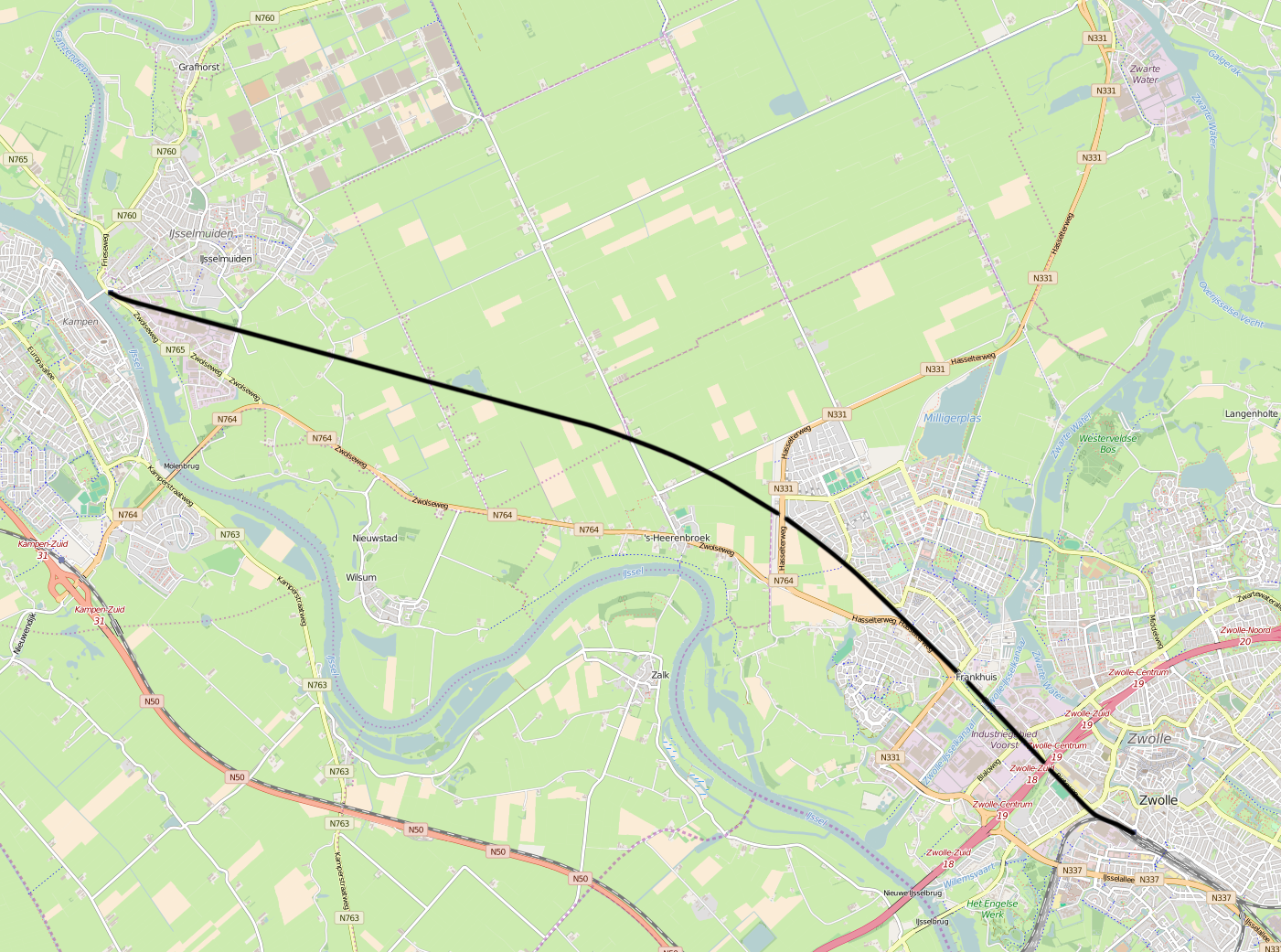
Map of the Kamperlijntje

The Kamperlijntje is a railway in the Netherlands running since 10 May 1865 between the cities of Zwolle and Kampen in the province Overijssel. The most northern part of the Utrecht–Kampen railway (Centraalspoorweg), the 12 km long section now has three stations, two are its termini: Zwolle and Kampen, and an intermediate station, Zwolle Stadshagen. In the past, it had two more stations: Zwolle Veerallee (closed in 1969) and Mastenbroek (closed in 1933 and again in 1941). The journey between Zwolle and Kampen takes about ten minutes.

The line is operated by Keolis Nederland (with electric Stadler FLIRT trains departing twice an hour) and funded in part by the province of Overijssel and the municipalities of Zwolle and Kampen.

A new intermediary station, Zwolle Stadshagen, was initially scheduled to open in December 2017, but because of groundwork issues, its opening was postponed. It was finally opened on 15 December 2019.
