= Nunspeet railway station =

Railway station in the Netherlands

Nunspeet
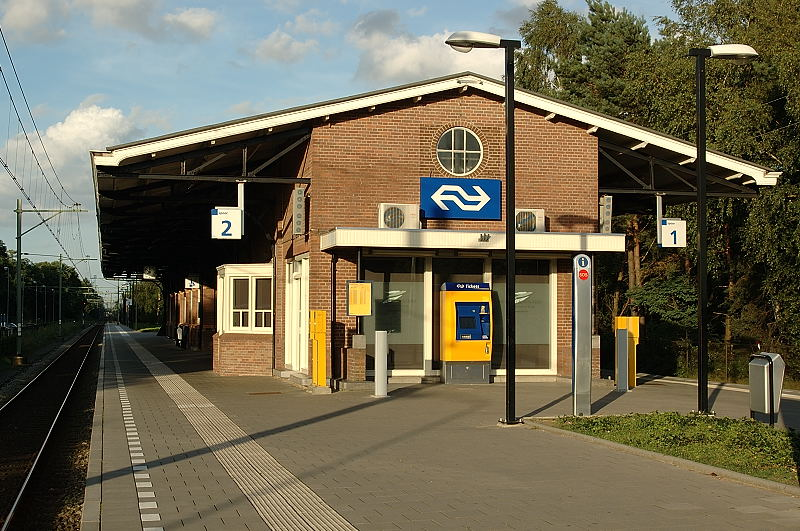
- Nunspeet railway station in 2008

General information
- Location: Netherlands
- Coordinates: 52°22′15″N 5°47′05″E
- Line: Utrecht–Kampen railway

History
- Opened: 1863

Services
Preceding station	Nederlandse Spoorwegen	Following station
Harderwijk towards Utrecht Centraal	NS Sprinter 5600	't Harde towards Zwolle
Location
- Location within Netherlands

Nunspeet is a railway station located in Nunspeet, Netherlands. The station was opened on 20 August 1863 and is located on the Amersfoort–Zwolle section of the Utrecht–Kampen railway (Centraalspoorweg). The services are operated by Nederlandse Spoorwegen.

Route	Service type	Notes
Utrecht – Amersfoort – Harderwijk – Zwolle	Local ("Sprinter")	2x per hour

== Bus services ==
Line	Route	Operator	Notes
100	Nunspeet - Doornspijk - Elburg - Oldebroek - Wezep - Hattemerbroek - Hattem - Zwolle	Syntus Gelderland	
111	Harderwijk - Hierden - Hulshorst - Nunspeet	Syntus Gelderland	On evenings, this bus only operates if called one hour before its supposed departure ("belbus").
112	Nunspeet - Vierhouten - Elspeet - Uddel - Garderen - Wittenberg	Syntus Gelderland	On evenings and Sundays, this bus only operates if called one hour before its supposed departure ("belbus").
200	Zwolle - Wezep - Oldebroek - Elburg (← Doornspijk ← Nunspeet)	Syntus Gelderland	Rush hours only, with a few extra runs before the start of the afternoon rush.
600	Nunspeet → Doornspijk → Elburg → Oldebroek → Wezep → Zwolle Deltion Campus	Syntus Gelderland	1 run during morning rush hours only.
658	Nunspeet - Elspeet - Uddel - Hoog-Soeren - Apeldoorn Erasmusstraat	Van Kooten	1 run during both rush hours only.
