= Zwolle Stadshagen railway station =

Railway station in Zwolle, Netherlands

Zwolle Stadshagen
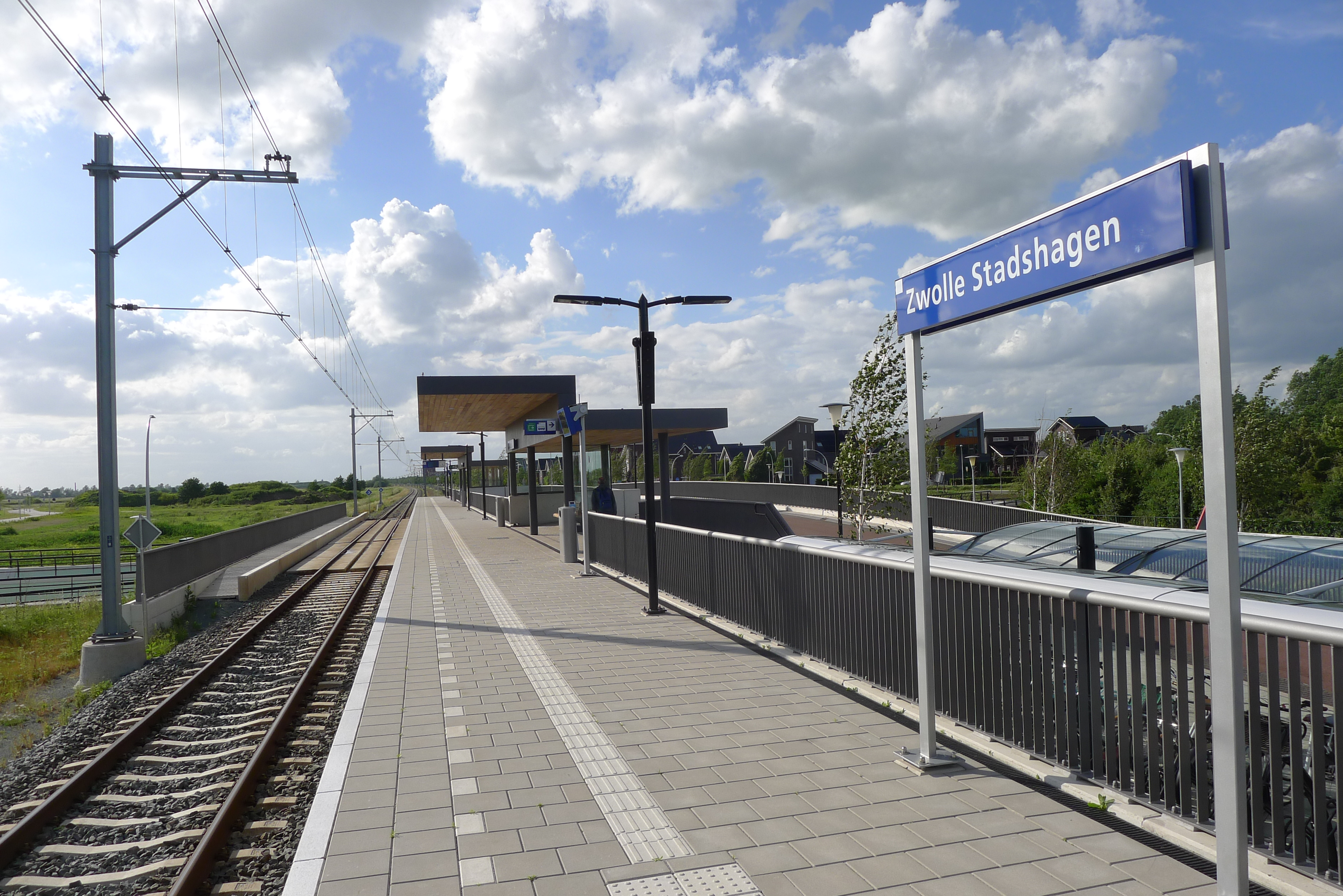

General information
- Location: Rozenpad 9; 8042AB Zwolle
- Coordinates: 52°31′40.5″N 6°03′03.9″E
- Line: Kamperlijntje

History
- Opened: 15 December 2019

Services
Preceding station	Keolis Nederland	Following station
Kampen Terminus	Sprinter 8500	Zwolle Terminus
Location
- Location within Netherlands

Zwolle Stadshagen is a railway station at Stadshagen, a Vinex-location suburb of Zwolle, Overijssel, Netherlands. It is the sole intermediate station on the Kamperlijntje, between the termini at Zwolle and Kampen. The station was opened on 15 December 2019.

The station was originally planned to be opened in December 2017. It was discovered, however, that the renovation of the track was done with a technical error, and the trains could not go as fast as planned. In 2018, the technical issues were solved, and, after a short trial, the decision was made to open the station on 15 December 2019, when the new schedule of the Dutch Railways was enacted.
