= Schothorst =

Coordinates: 52.1742°N 5.3933°E

Schothorst is the second largest district by population in the Dutch city of Amersfoort. It is located in central Amersfoort, between the districts of Liendert, Landgoed Schothorst (an estate) and De Koppel. The neighbourhood was built in the 1970s and 1980s and today forms a quiet, leafy area of the city. Housing consists of a mixture of detached houses with gardens, terraced houses and apartment buildings, including two of the highest residential towers in Amersfoort: De Waaier, at 14 storeys, and De Vuurtoren, at 16 storeys, both located along the Valleikanaal.

The district has numerous facilities, including a shopping mall, several primary and secondary schools, the Amersfoort Schothorst railway station, doctors' offices, sports halls, a recreation area, and several green areas including parks.

The district is named after the farm on Landgoed Schothorst. The name Schothorst is composed of the words "schot" (an area that is enclosed by a wooden fence) and 'horst' (a sandy hill) and means, referring to the sandy terrain (left by the last ice age) on which the district is located. The Schothorst Estate was founded in 1780 and a villa, also named Schothorst, was constructed there in the mid-19th century.
