= Frank Berghuis =

Dutch footballer

Personal information
- Date of birth: 2 May 1967 (age 59)
- Place of birth: Nunspeet, Netherlands
- Height: 1.82 m (6 ft 0 in)
- Position: Left winger

Youth career
- AGOVV
- Apeldoornse Boys
- PSV

Senior career*
Years	Team	Apps	(Gls)
1984–1986	PSV	3	(1)
1986–1988	FC VVV	47	(6)
1988	PSV	2	(0)
1988–1989	Zwolle	15	(3)
1989–1991	Volendam	66	(23)
1991–1992	Galatasaray	0	(0)
1992–1993	Volendam	51	(12)
1993–1995	Lommel	38	(8)
1995–2000	Cambuur	103	(17)
Total		325	(70)

International career
1989	Netherlands	1	(0)
- * Club domestic league appearances and goals

Frank Berghuis (born 2 May 1967) is a Dutch retired footballer who played as a left winger.

== Club career ==
Born in Nunspeet, Berghuis played for AGOVV, Apeldoornse Boys, PSV, FC VVV, Zwolle, Volendam, Galatasaray, Lommel and Cambuur.

== International career ==
Nicknamed Pico, he made one international appearance for the Netherlands national team in 1989 against West Germany.

== Personal life ==
His son Steven Berghuis is also a professional footballer, making the Berghuis family one of nine Dutch football families having more than one international player.
