= Ermelo railway station =

Railway station in the Netherlands

Ermelo
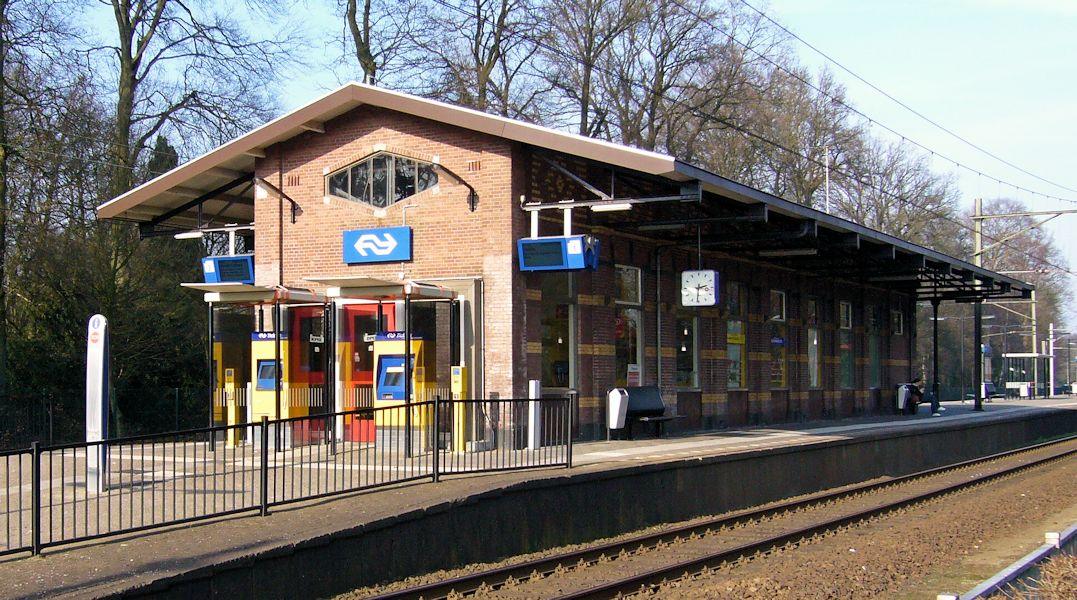

General information
- Location: Netherlands
- Coordinates: 52°18′04″N 5°36′52″E
- Line: Utrecht–Kampen railway

History
- Opened: 1882

Services
Preceding station	Nederlandse Spoorwegen	Following station
Putten towards Utrecht Centraal	NS Sprinter 5600	Harderwijk towards Zwolle
Location
- Location within Netherlands

Ermelo is a railway station located in Ermelo, Netherlands. The station was opened on 1 June 1882 (an official report from the then operating company NCS also mentions 1-6-1882 as the official opening date) and is located on the Amersfoort–Zwolle section of the Utrecht–Kampen railway (Centraalspoorweg). The station is operated by Nederlandse Spoorwegen. It was previously called Ermelo- Veldwijk (1863–1952).

== Train services ==
The following services currently call at Ermelo:

Route	Service type	Notes
Utrecht – Amersfoort – Harderwijk – Zwolle	Local ("Sprinter")	2x per hour

=== Bus services ===
Line	Route	Operator	Notes
501	Garderen - Speuld - Drie - Ermelo - Horst	Syntus Gelderland	Mon-Sat during daytime hours only.
654	Ermelo - Leuvenum - Staverden - Elspeet - Uddel - Nieuw-Milligen - Hoog-Soeren - Apeldoorn Jacobus Fruytierschool	Van Kooten	Only 1 run during both rush hours.
