= Nunspeet =

- Municipality
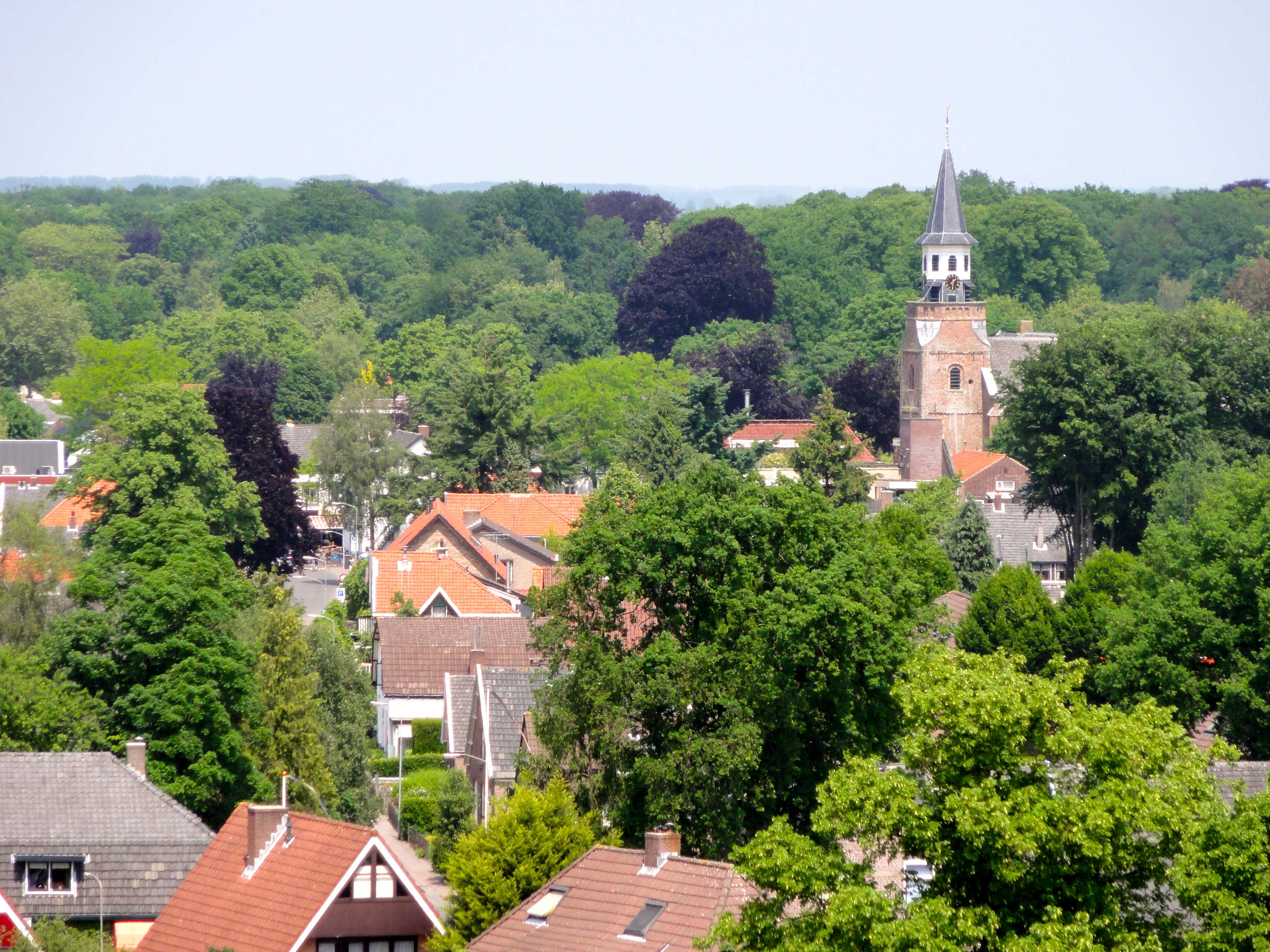
- Skyline of Nunspeet

- Flag Coat of arms

- Location in Gelderland
- Coordinates: 52°23′N 5°47′E
- Country: Netherlands
- Province: Gelderland

Government
  - Body: Municipal council
  - Mayor: Céline Blom (D66)

Area
  - Total: 129.53 km^{2} (50.01 sq mi)
  - Land: 128.74 km^{2} (49.71 sq mi)
  - Water: 0.79 km^{2} (0.31 sq mi)
- Elevation: 8 m (26 ft)

Population (January 2021)
  - Total: 28,021
  - Density: 218/km^{2} (560/sq mi)
- Demonym: Nunspeter
- Time zone: UTC+1 (CET)
  - Summer (DST): UTC+2 (CEST)
- Postcode: 8070–8077
- Area code: 0341, 0577
- Website: www.nunspeet.nl

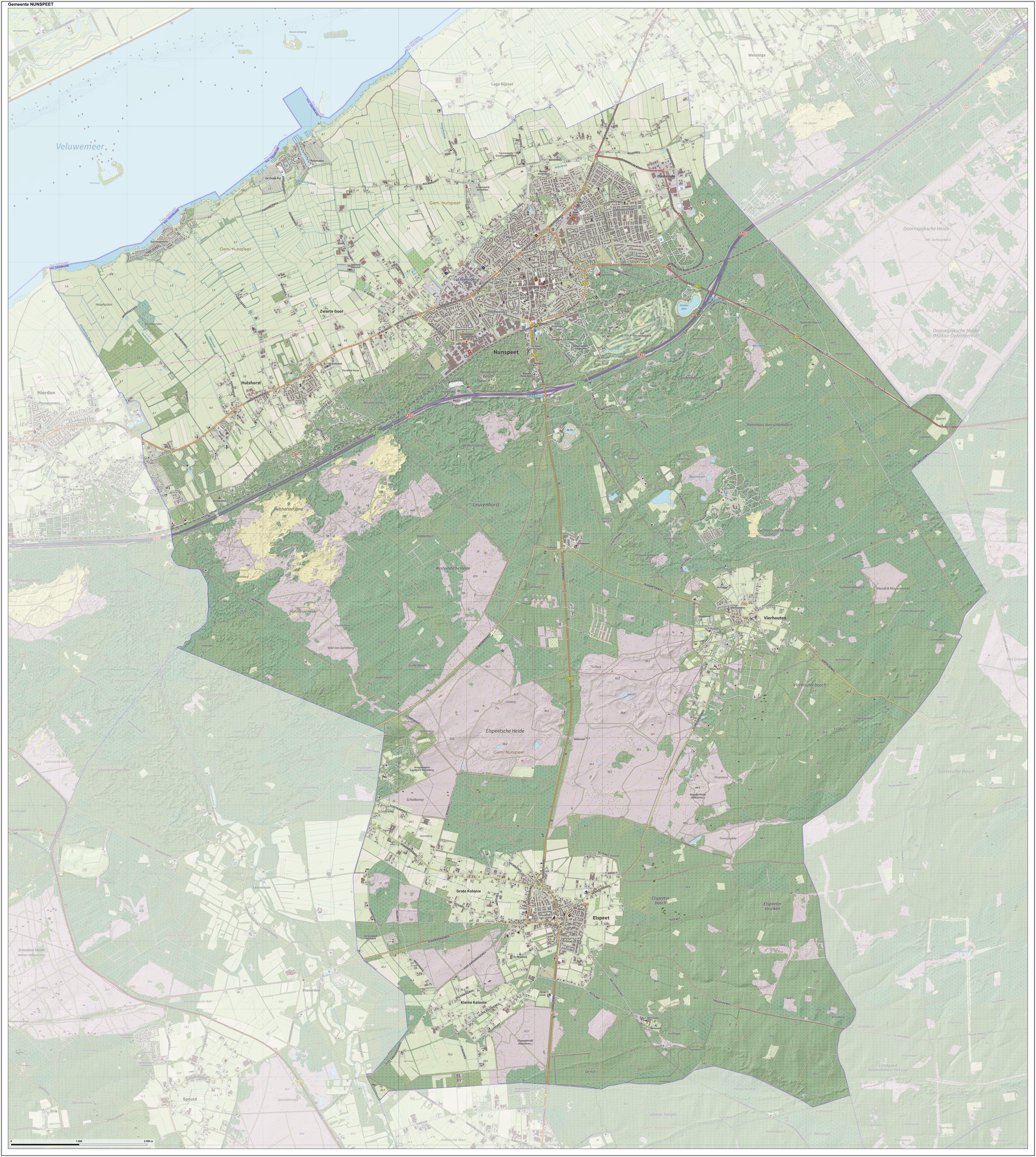
Dutch Topographic map of Nunspeet, June 2015

Nunspeet (Dutch pronunciation: [ˈnʏnspeːt]) is a municipality and town in the central Netherlands. It has been an agricultural site since prehistoric times. The municipality contains a number of villages, namely Hulshorst, Elspeet, and Vierhouten. Nunspeet has a vivid historical foundation, called Nuwenspete. In 1972 Nunspeet became a separate municipality after having been part of Ermelo before.

== Recreation ==
Nunspeet is a popular tourist area because it is surrounded by woods, holiday resorts and the former sea. Nunspeet has a town center which is located around the main market square.

Nunspeet is situated on the shore of the Veluwemeer (Veluwe lake) which makes it popular for water leisure. There is also a small lake called "de Zandenplas" which is a popular recreational area in wooded sandy terrain.

Other tourist attractions include the weekly market and the town festival, De nacht van Nunspeet (Nunspeet Night) and the Eibertjesmarkt (Eibertjes market), as well as an annual sporting event called "de Keiler".

== Population centres ==
- Elspeet
- Hulshorst
- Nunspeet
- Vierhouten

== Transport ==
- Nunspeet railway station

== See also ==
- Round House

== Notable people ==
- Henry Van Asselt (1817 in Elspeet - 1902) a Dutch immigrant to the US, in the area that is now Seattle, Washington
- Tijs Tinbergen (born 1947 in Hulshorst) a Dutch filmmaker
- Frank Berghuis (born 1967 in Nunspeet) a Dutch former footballer
- Leon Bolier (born 1980 in Nunspeet), also known by his mononym Bolier, is a Dutch classically trained trance composer, DJ and record producer

== Gallery ==
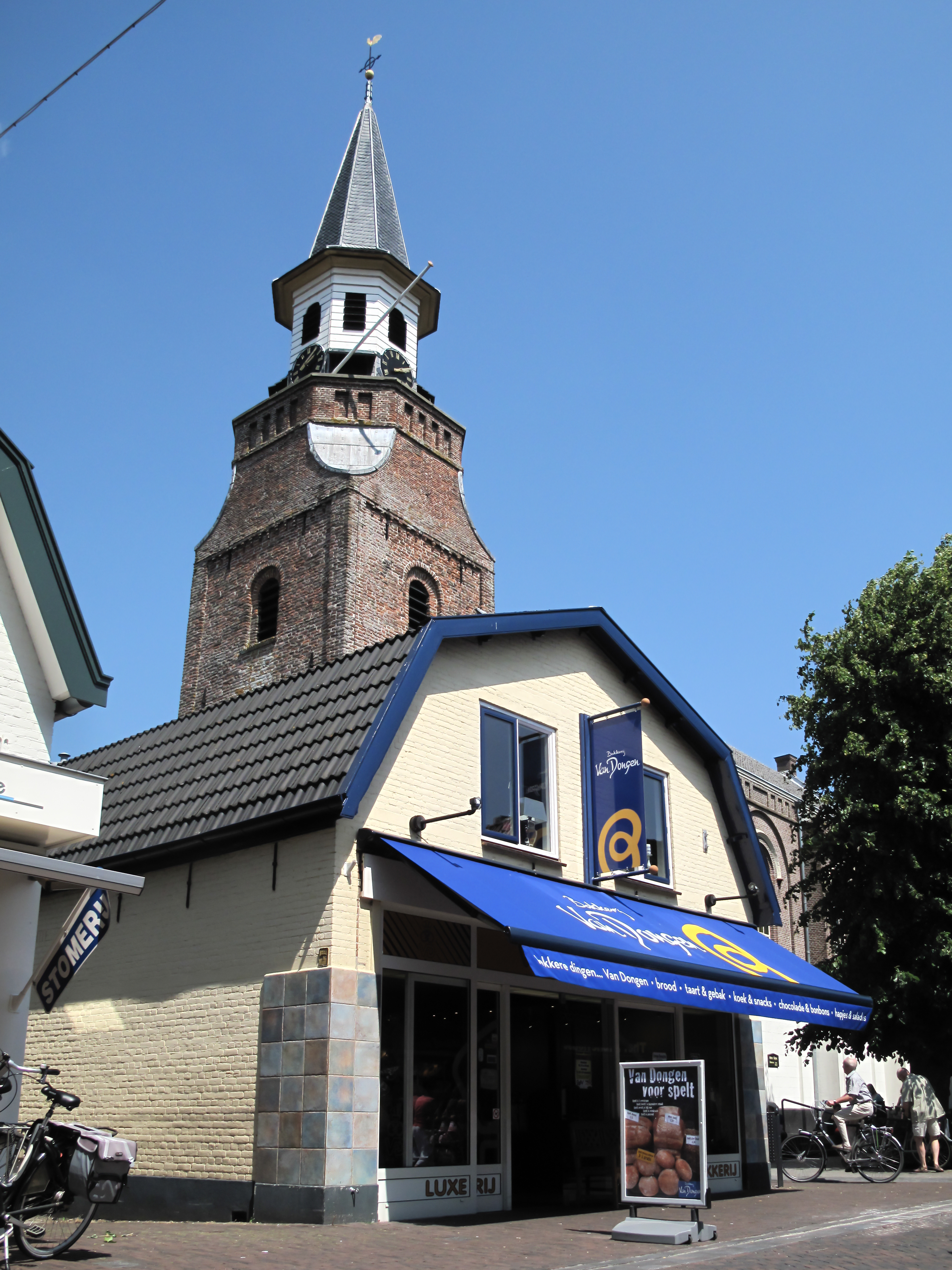
Reformed church in Nunspeet

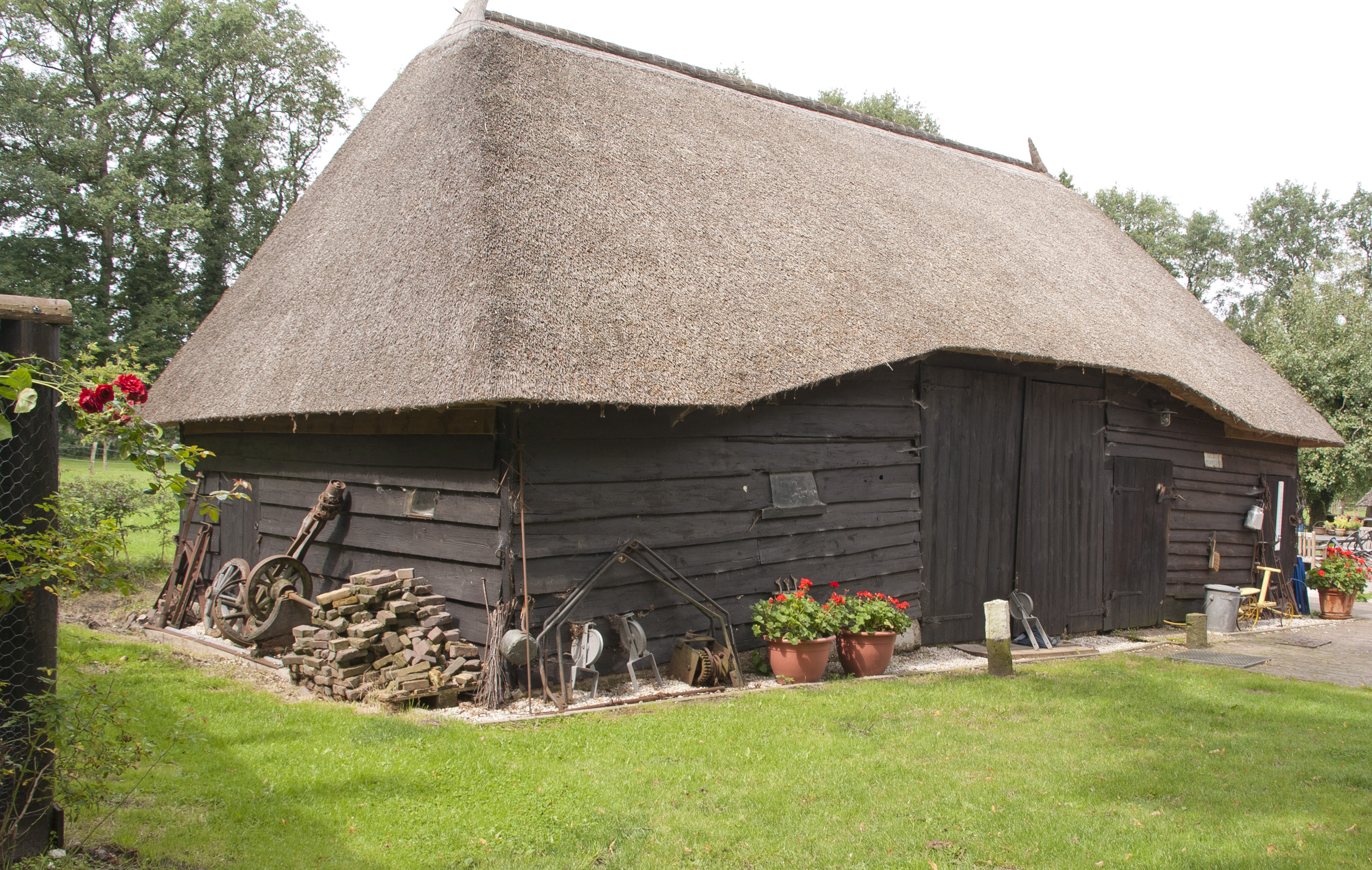
Wooden cattle barn, early 20th century in Nunspeet

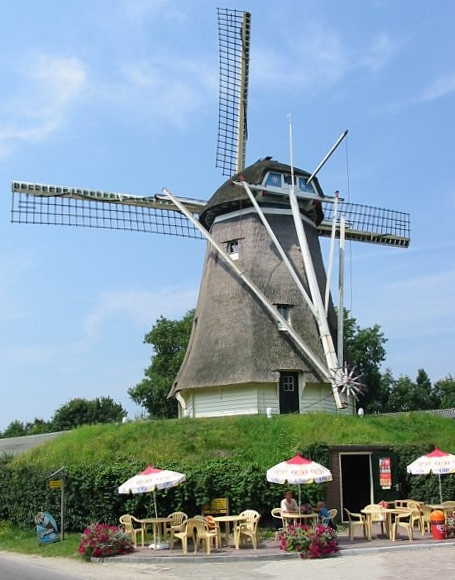
"De Duif" windmill, a beltmolen in Nunspeet

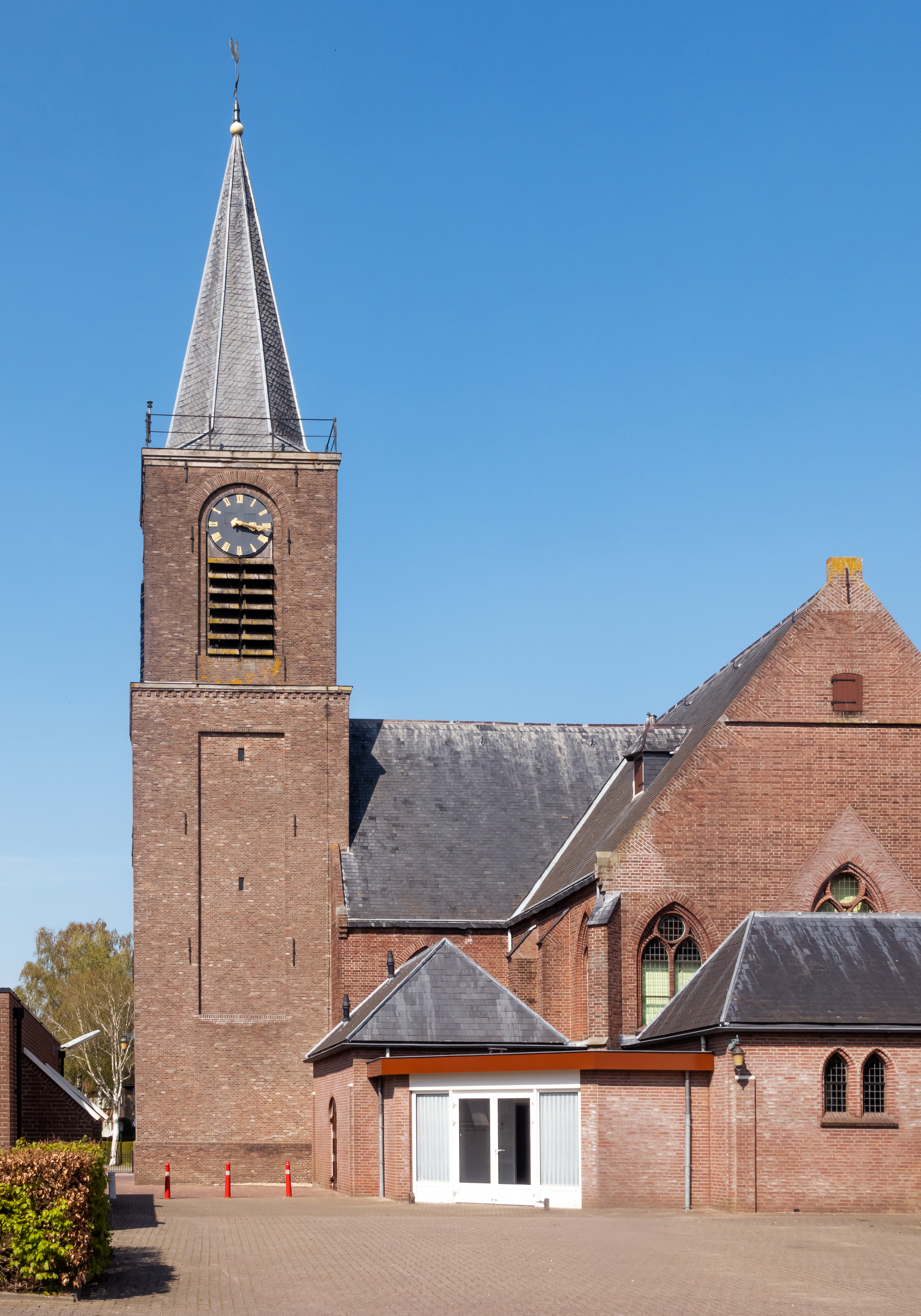
Church in Elspeet

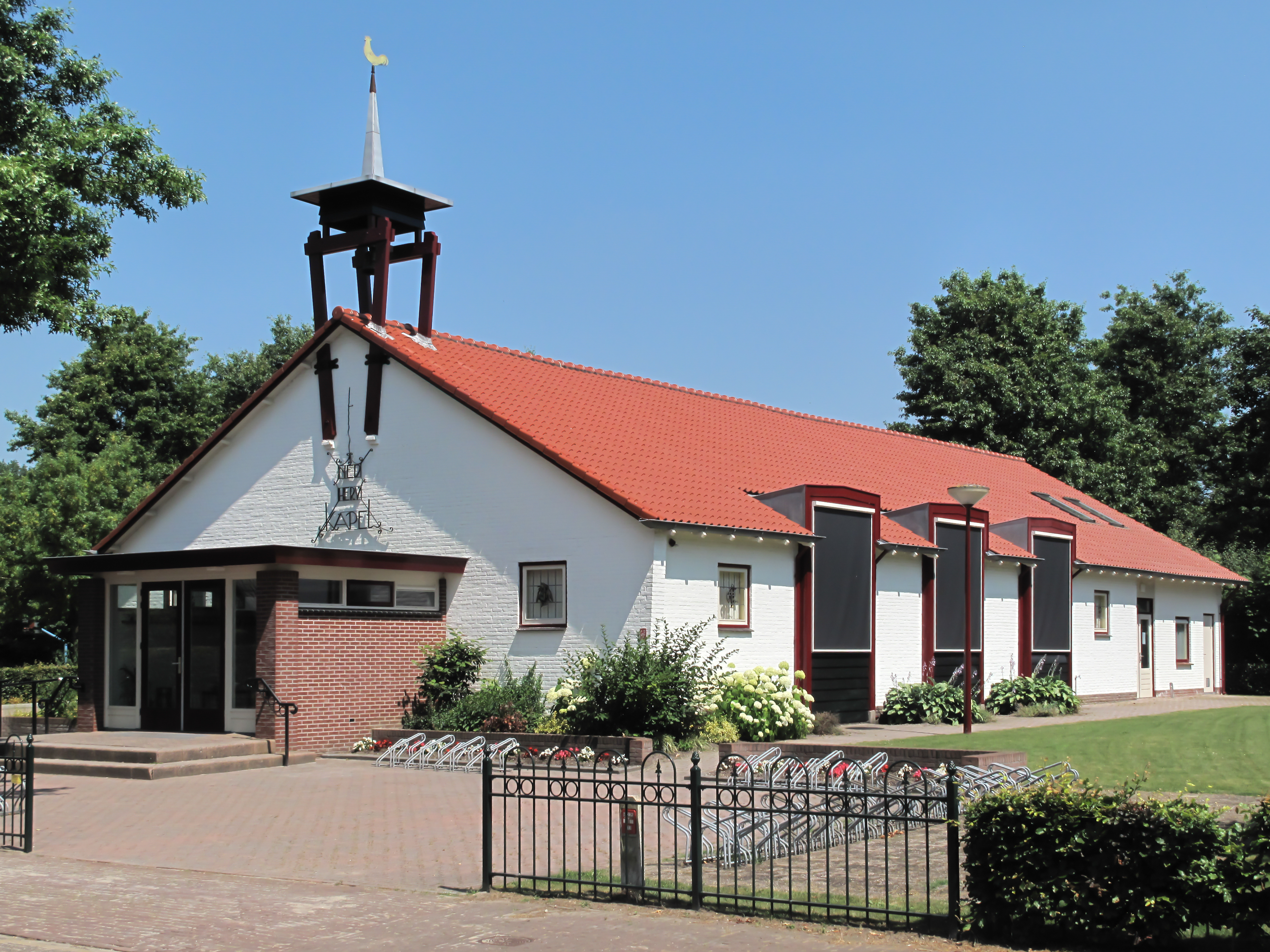
Reformed chapel in Hulshorst

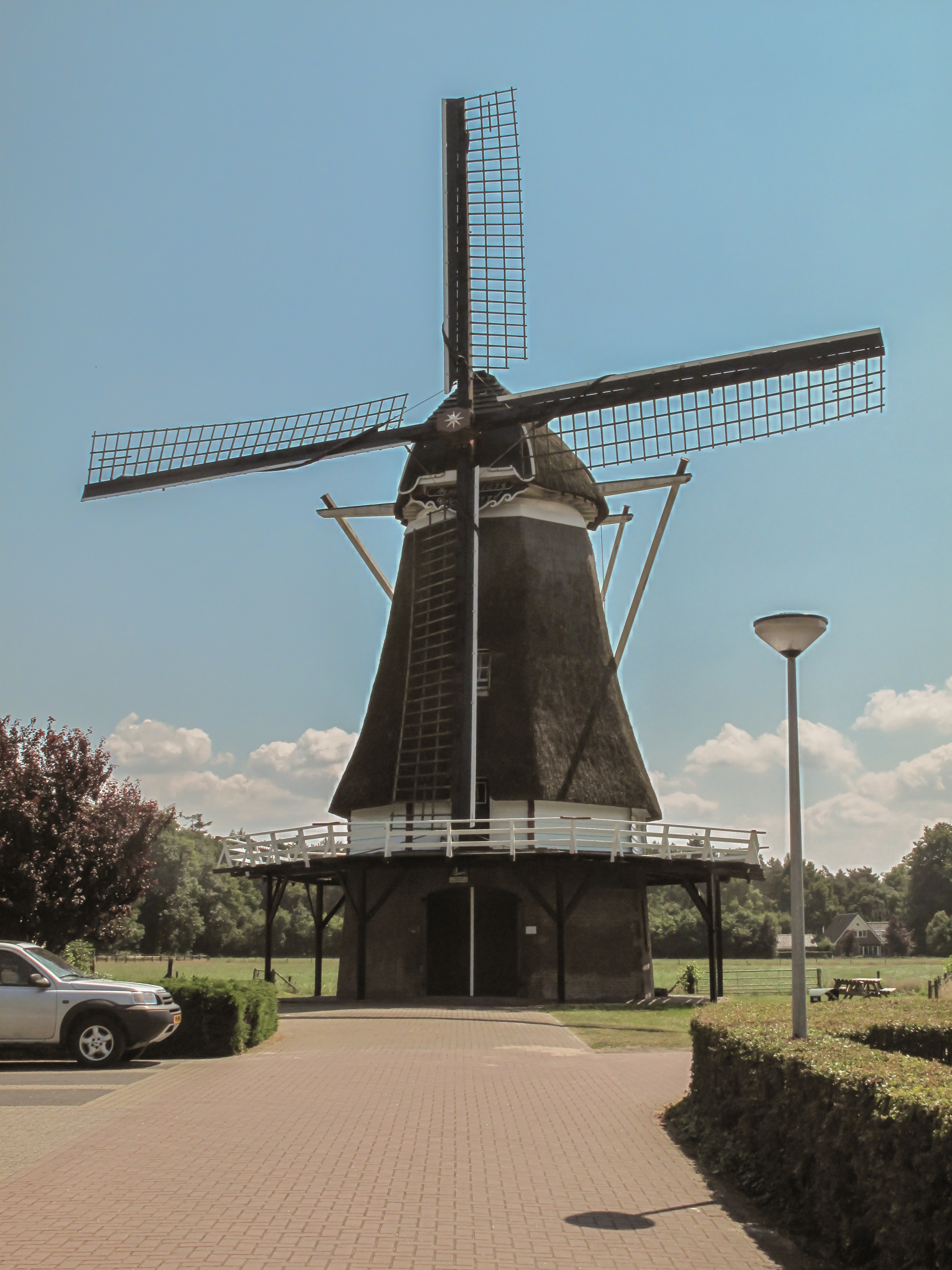
Windmill (molen de Maagd) in Hulshorst
