= Wezep =

- Town
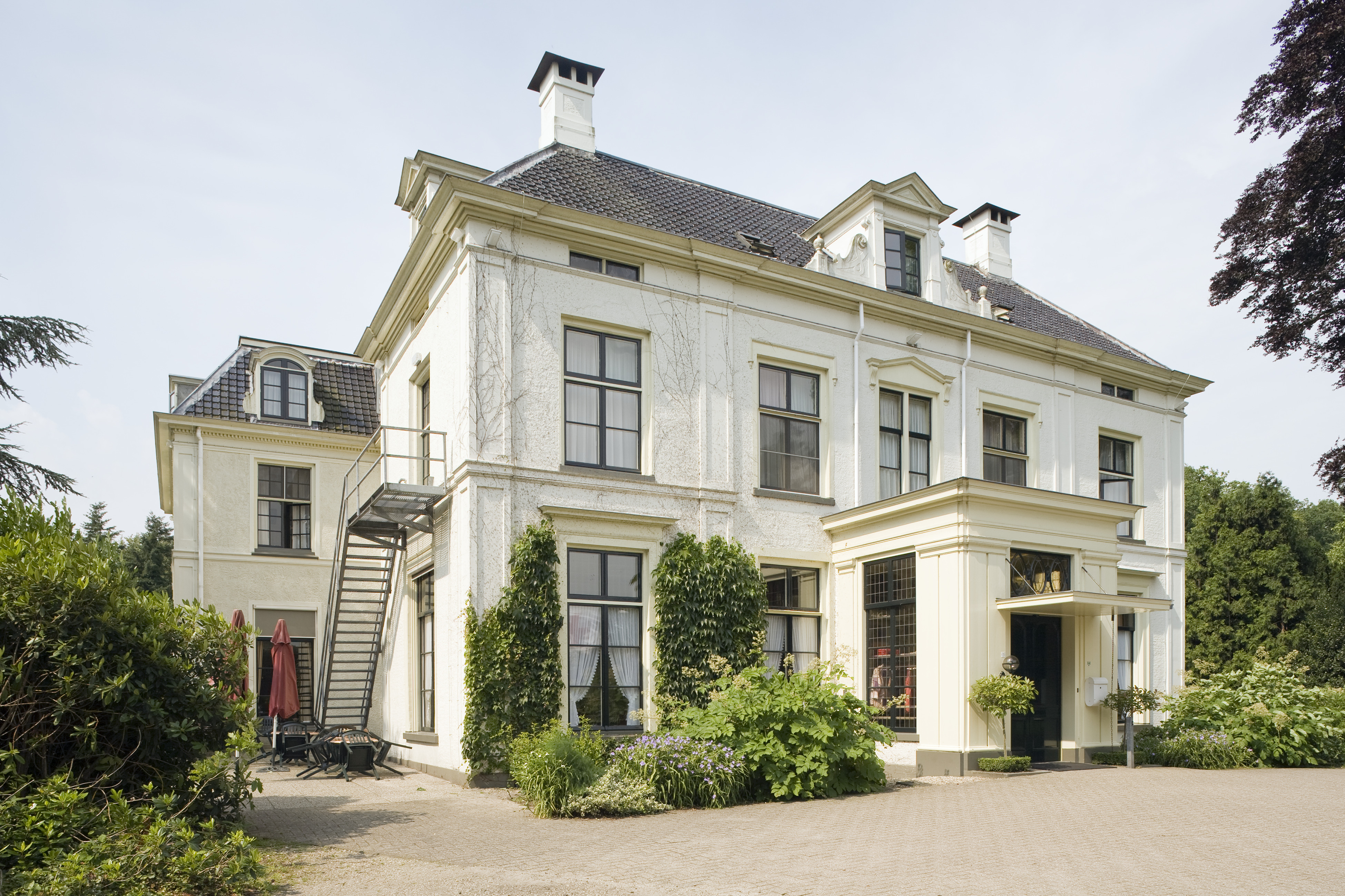
- The IJsselvliedt in Wezep, protected as Rijksmonument number 529075

- Location in the province of Gelderland in the Netherlands Wezep (Netherlands)
- Coordinates: 52°27′45″N 5°59′54″E
- Country: Netherlands
- Province: Gelderland
- Municipality: Oldebroek

Area
  - Total: 29.22 km^{2} (11.28 sq mi)
- Elevation: 4.4 m (14 ft)

Population (2021)
  - Total: 13,715
  - Density: 469.4/km^{2} (1,216/sq mi)
- Time zone: UTC+1 (CET)
  - Summer (DST): UTC+2 (CEST)
- Postal code: 8091
- Dialing code: 038

Wezep is a town in the municipality of Oldebroek, Netherlands. Located in the province of Gelderland, it had about 13,500 inhabitants in 2012. The Wezep railway station, located on the Utrecht–Zwolle railway, is the town's main landmark. The municipality's TV station is called LOCO TV.

== Sports ==
Wezep has several sport clubs.

	Club names
Soccer	WHC Wezep
Tennis	WTC
Volleybal	VZK
Korfball	Rood-Wit
Gymnastics	OLVO
Shooting	Schietsport Vereniging Wezep
Table tennis	TTV Pearle Wezep
Badminton	Badminton '80
Dancing	Dansschool Bruinewoud

== Notable residents ==
- René Ruitenberg (born 1970), speed skater and pastor
- Jan Terlouw (born 1931), physicist, author and politician
- Lana Wolf (born 1975), singer

== Economy ==
The Plukon Food Group, one of the largest poultry meat companies in Europe, has its headquarters in Wezep.

== Gallery ==
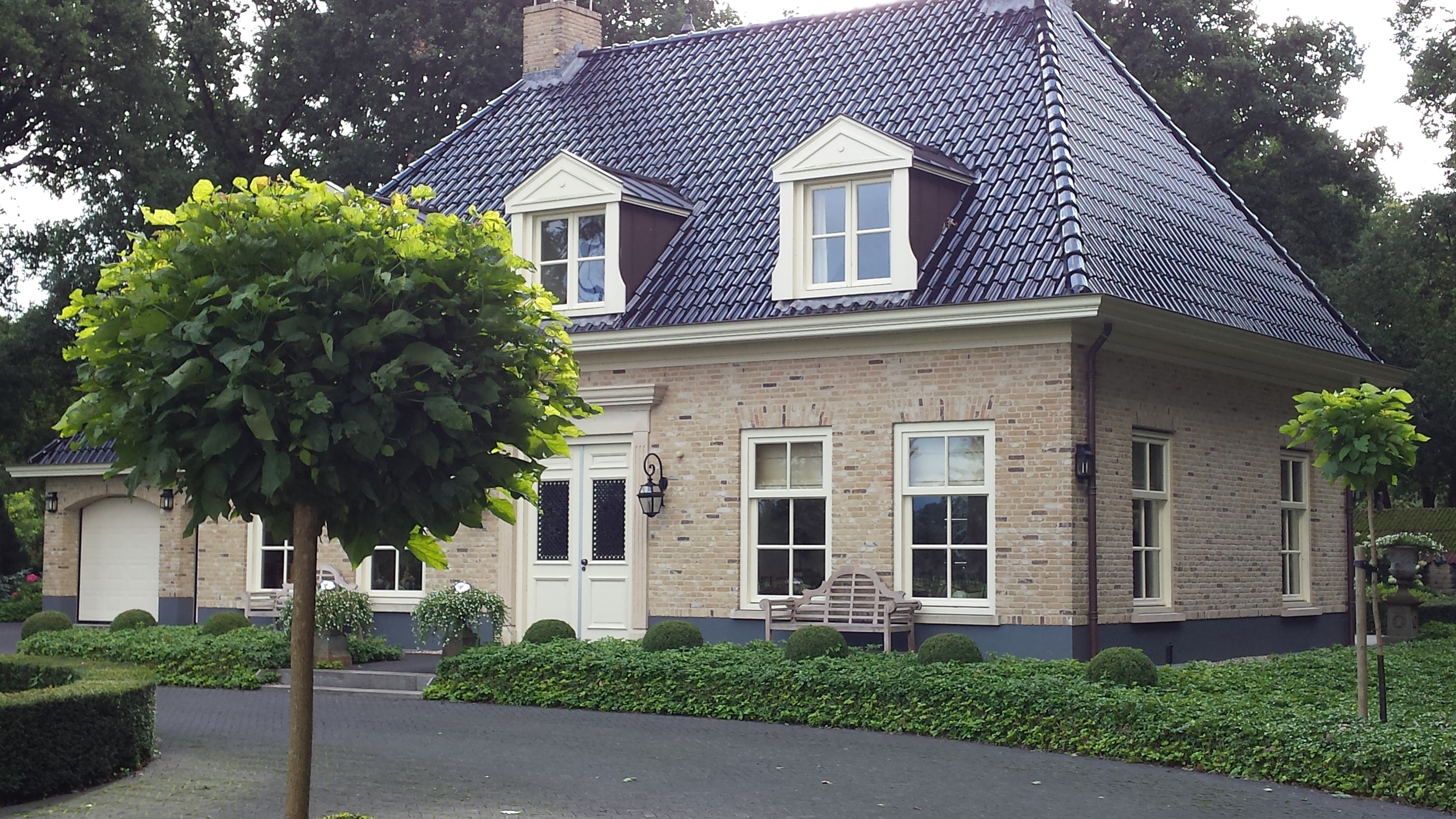
House in Wezep

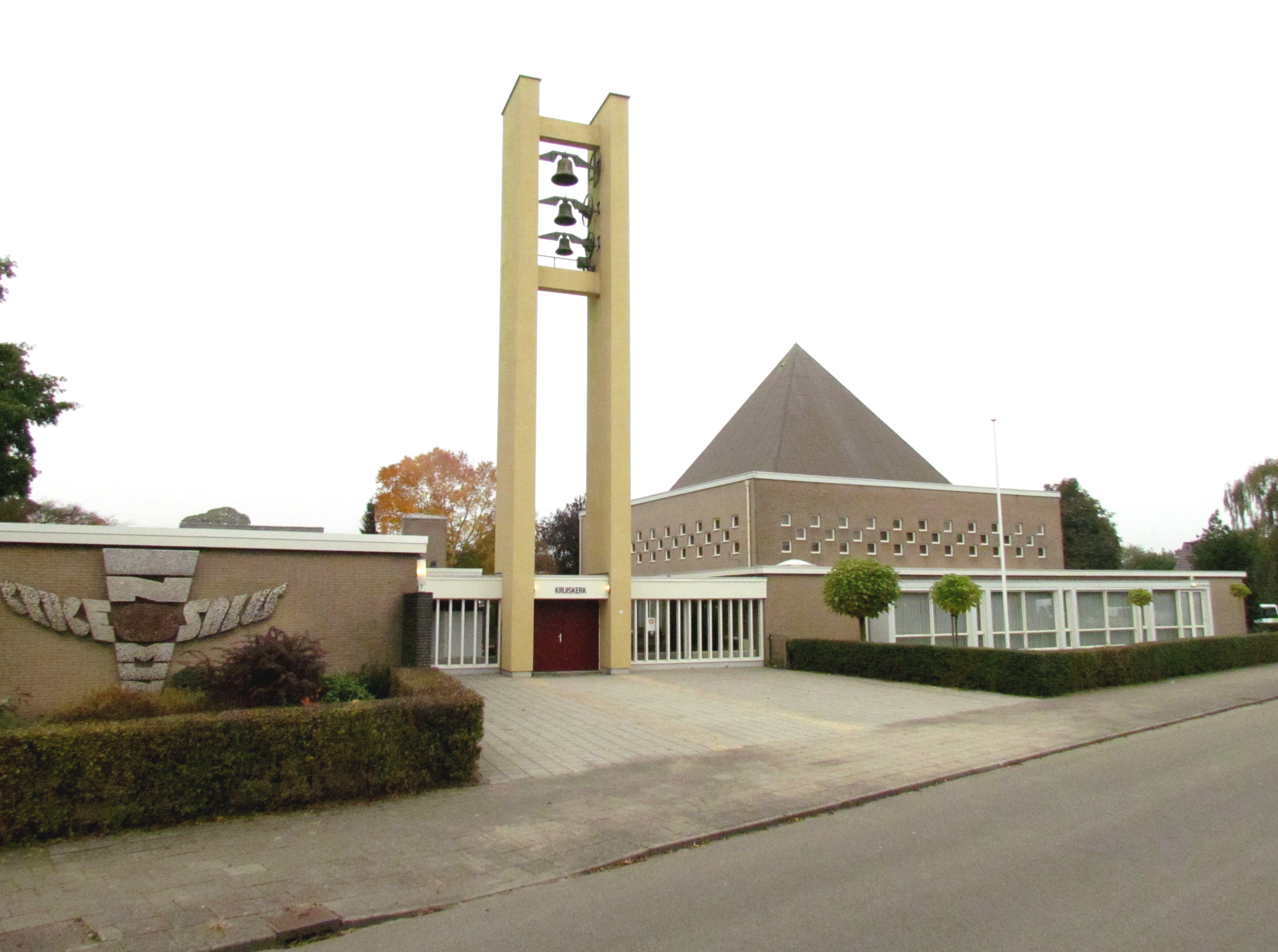
Church in Wezep

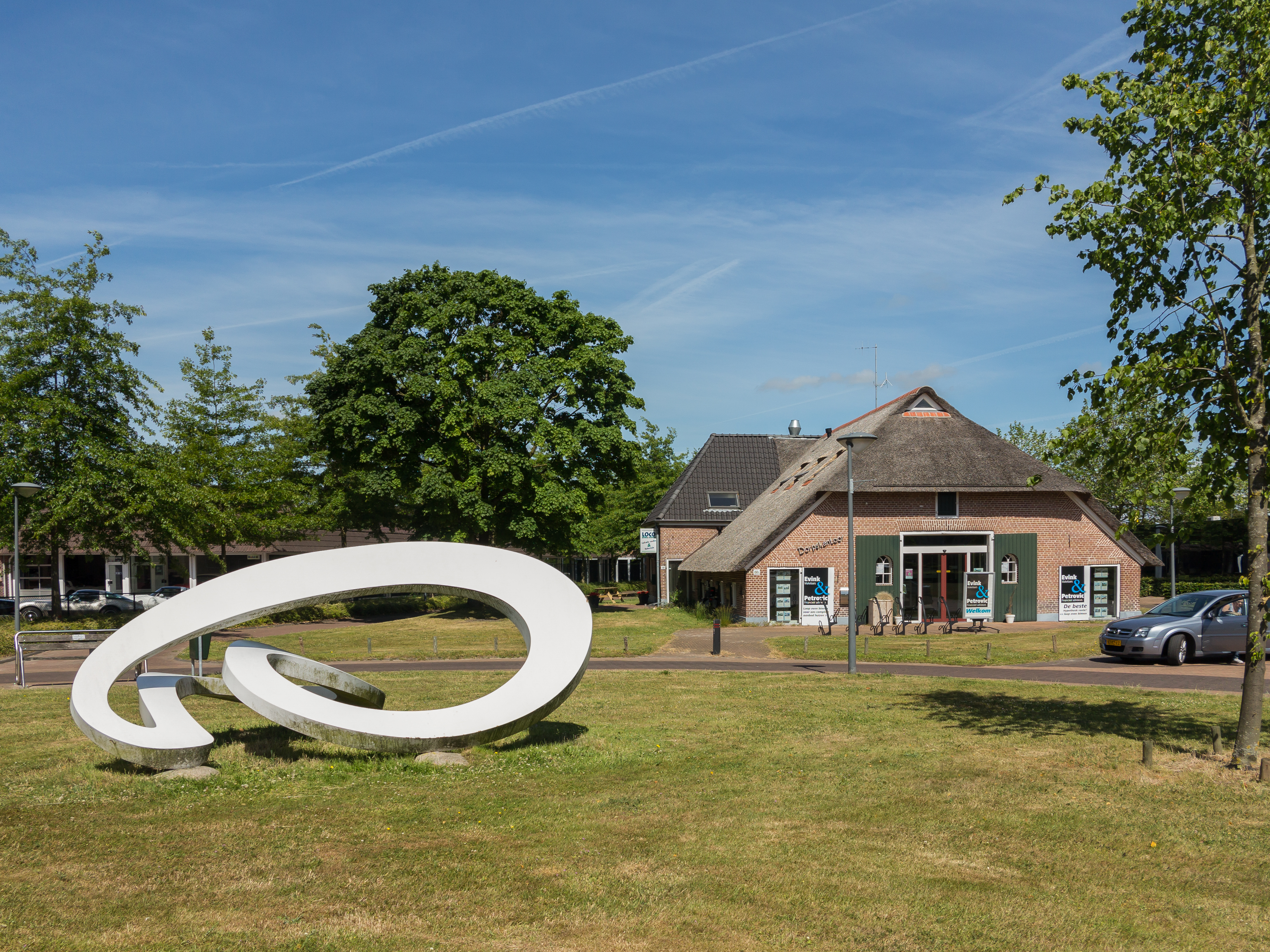
Village house

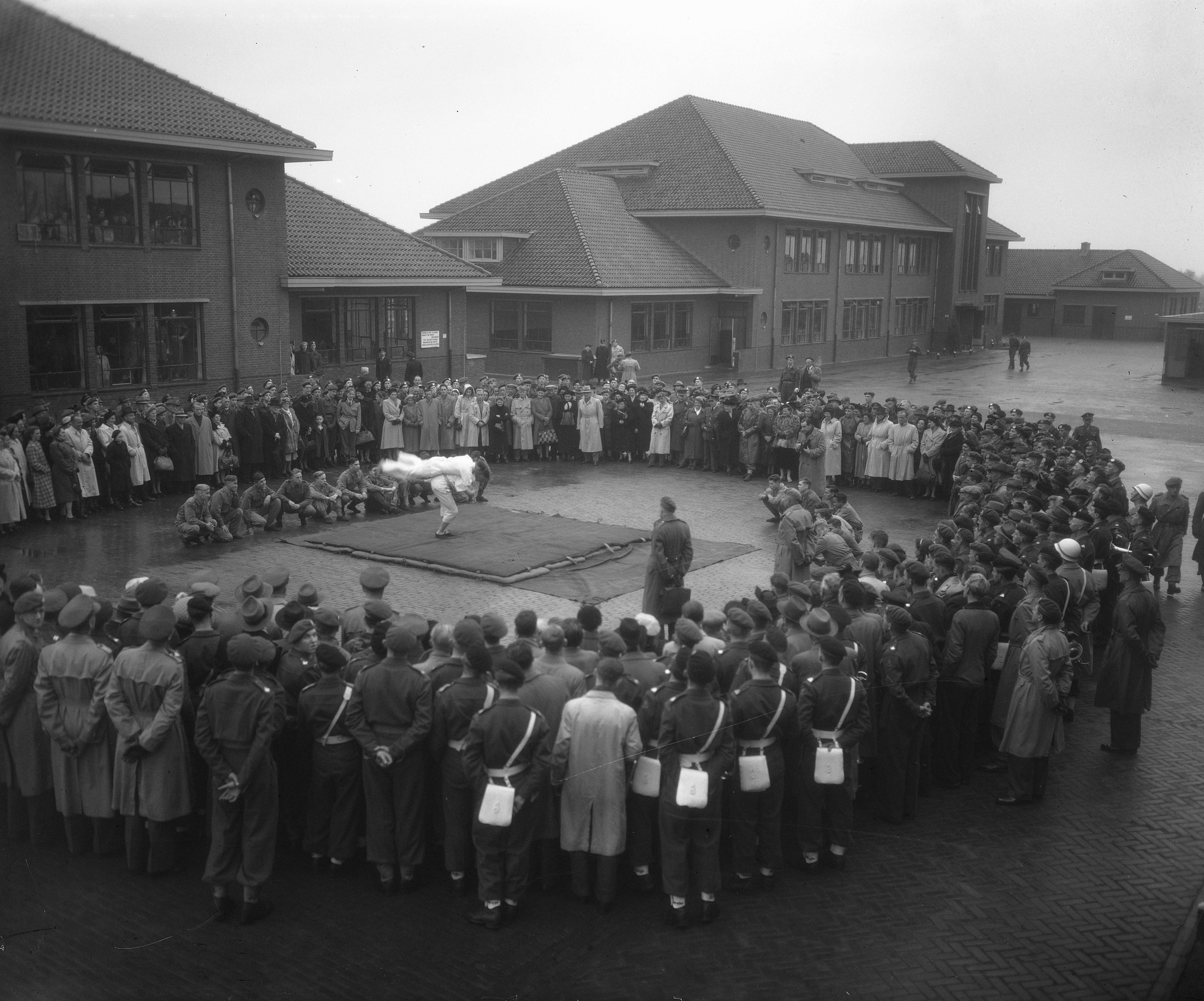
Demonstration of non-commissioned officer school (1951)
