= Utrecht–Kampen railway =

Railway line in the Netherlands

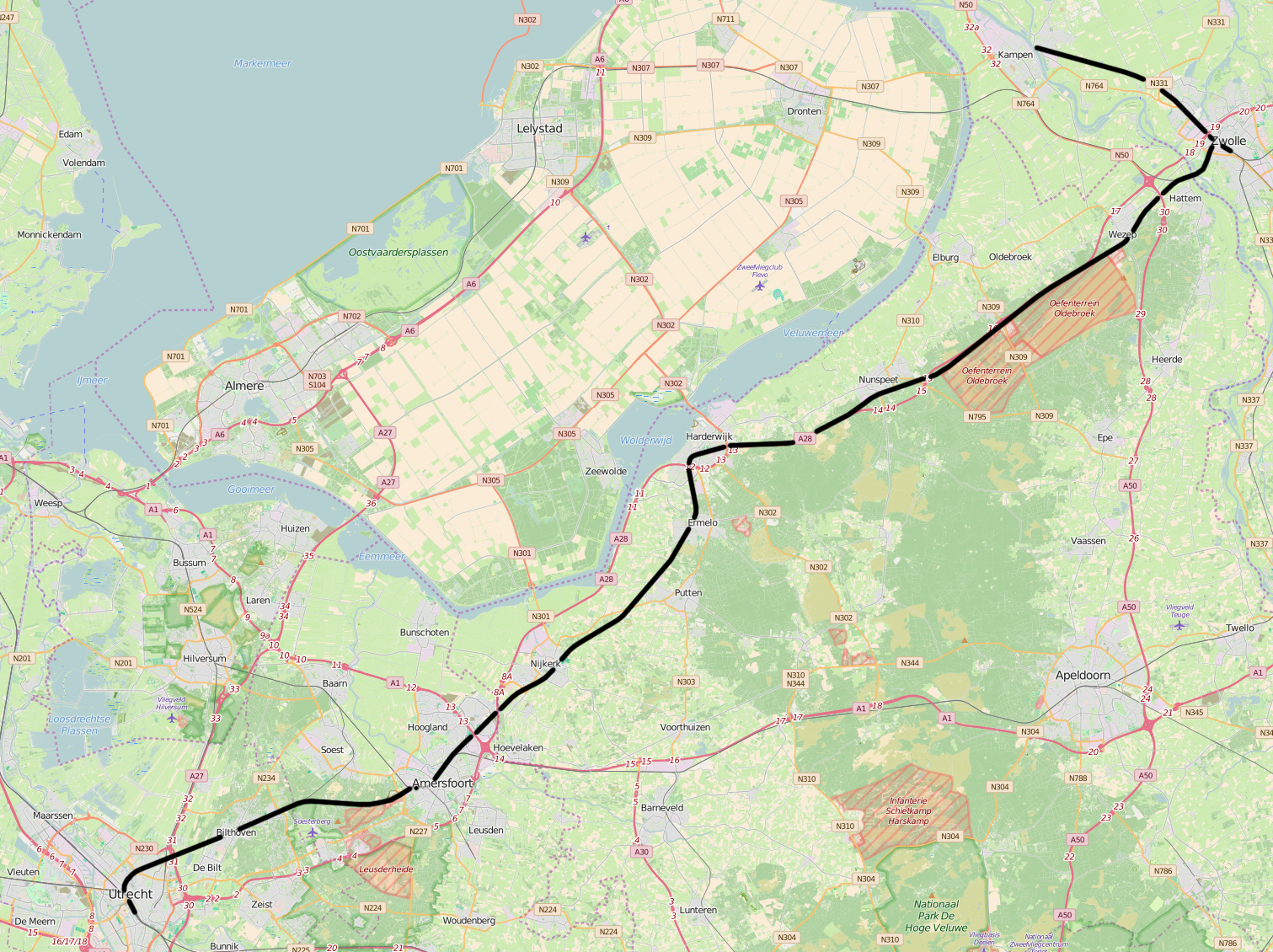
- Map of the Utrecht–Kampen railway, the most northern part of the line being the Kamperlijntje

Overview
- Status: Operational
- Locale: Netherlands
- Termini: Utrecht Centraal railway station; Kampen railway station

Service
- Operator(s): Nederlandse Spoorwegen, Keolis Nederland

History
- Opened: Utrecht – Hattemmerbroek: 20 August 1863; Hattemmerbroek – Zwolle: 6 June 1864; Zwolle – Kampen: 10 May 1865

Technical
- Line length: 101 km (63 mi)
- Num of tracks: Utrecht–Zwolle double track, Zwolle–Kampen single track
- Track gauge: 1,435 mm (4 ft 8 1/2 in) standard gauge
- Electrification: 1.5 kV DC

The Utrecht–Kampen railway (also known as Centraalspoorweg) is an important railway line in the Netherlands running from Utrecht to Kampen, passing through Bilthoven, Amersfoort, Nijkerk, Ermelo, Harderwijk, Nunspeet, Wezep and Zwolle. The line was opened between 1863 and 1865 by the Nederlandsche Centraal-Spoorweg-Maatschappij. Its northern part (Zwolle–Kampen) is known as the Kamperlijntje, currently operated by Keolis Nederland.

== Stations ==
The main interchange stations on the Utrecht–Kampen railway are:

- Utrecht Centraal railway station to Amsterdam, Rotterdam, Arnhem and Eindhoven
- Amersfoort railway station to Apeldoorn, Enschede and Amsterdam
- Zwolle railway station to Arnhem, Groningen, Leeuwarden, Emmen and Almelo

== Gallery ==
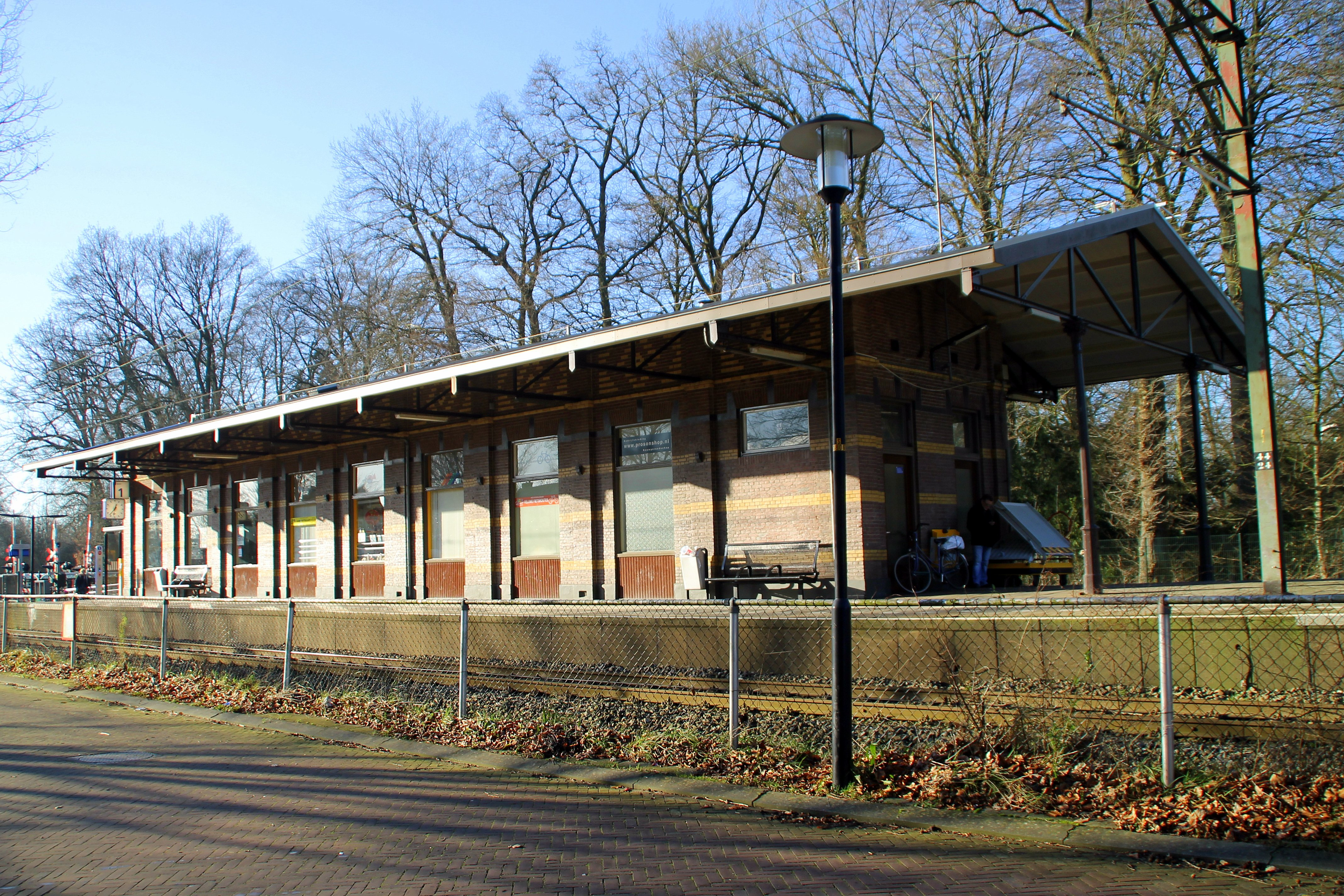
Ermelo railway station

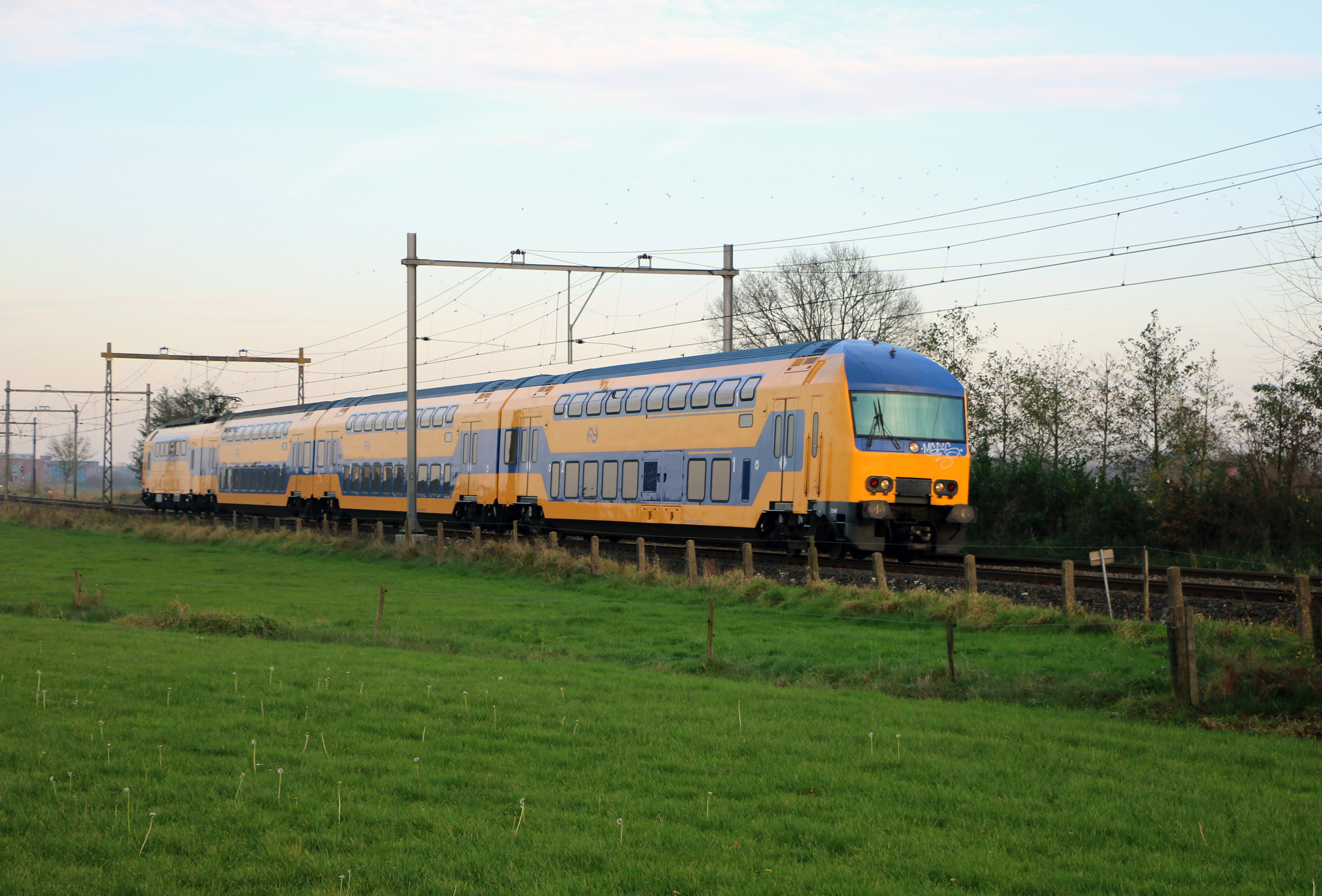
NS DD-AR between Nijkerk and Vathorst, near Holkerveen

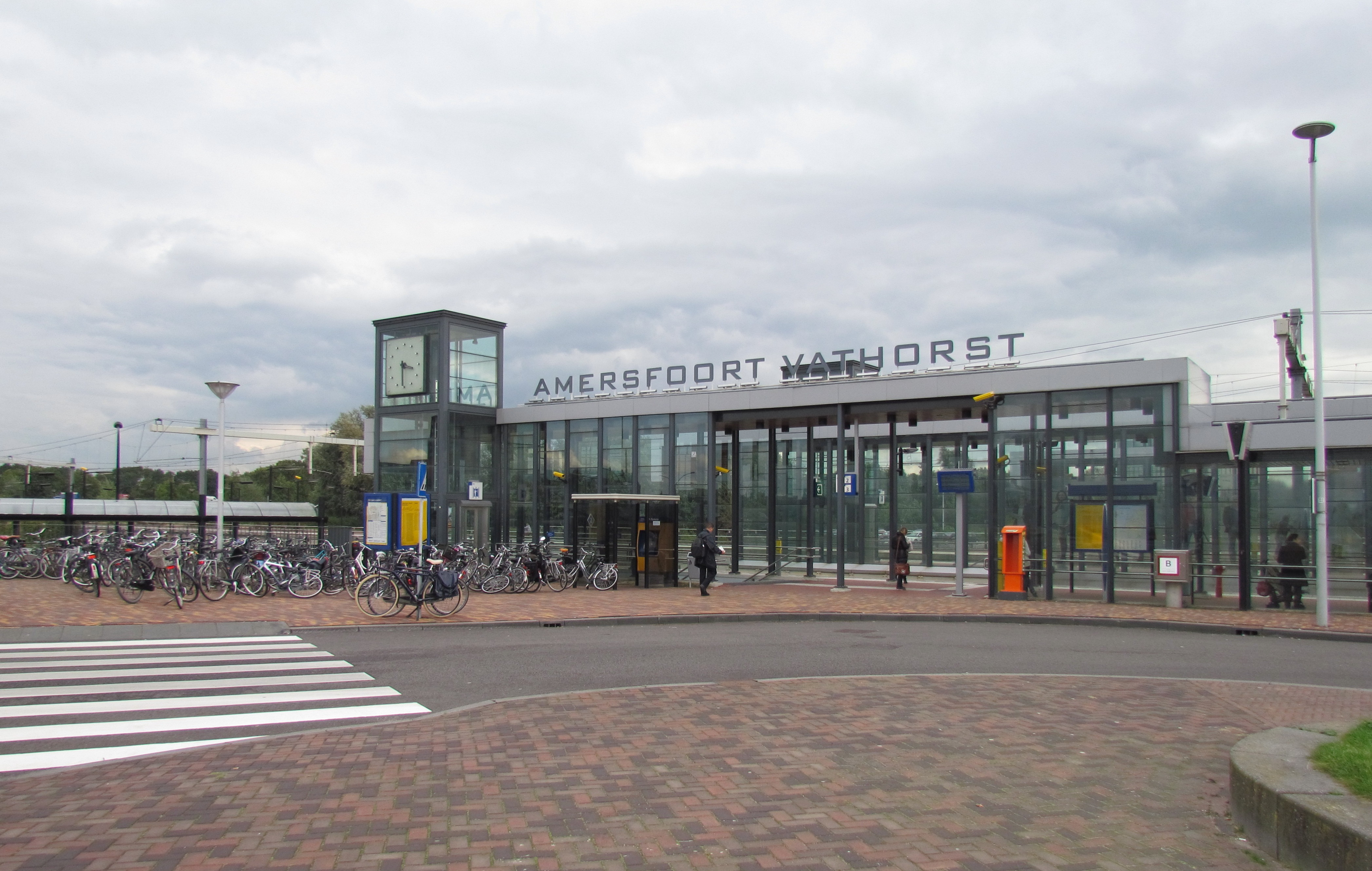
Amersfoort Vathorst railway station
