= Arend Vermaat =

Dutch politician (1939–2026)

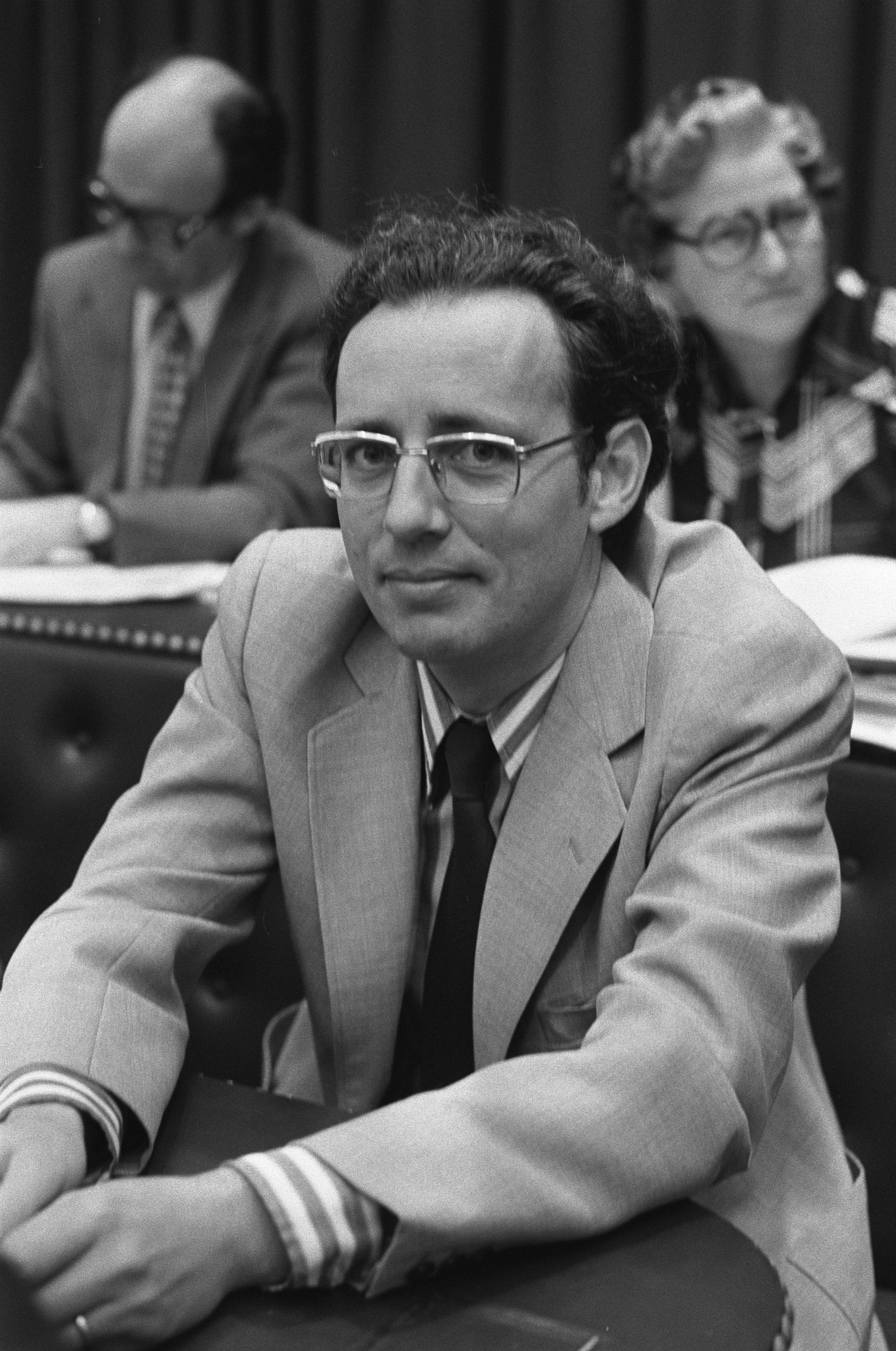
- Vermaat in 1975

Member of the Senate of the Netherlands
- In office 11 June 1991 – 13 June 1995

Member of the Provincial Council of Gelderland
- In office 2 June 1982 – 1 January 1988

Member of the House of Representatives of the Netherlands
- In office 3 August 1971 – 16 October 1975

Personal details
- Born: Arend Jan Vermaat; 2 November 1939 Hoevelaken, Netherlands
- Died: 12 January 2026 (aged 86) Voorthuizen, Netherlands
- Party: ARP; CDA
- Occupation: Professor

Arend Jan Vermaat (2 November 1939 – 12 January 2026) was a Dutch politician. A member of the Anti-Revolutionary Party and the Christian Democratic Appeal, he served in the House of Representatives from 1971 to 1975 and in the Senate from 1991 to 1995.

From 1975 to 1986 Vermaat was professor of public economics at the Vrije Universiteit Amsterdam. He then served as chair of the board of the Windesheim University of Applied Sciences from 1 August 1986 until 1 January 1988. Between 2 June 1982 and 1 January 1988 he was member of the Provincial Council of Gelderland.

Vermaat died in Voorthuizen on 12 January 2026, at the age of 86.
