= Barneveld (municipality) =

- Municipality
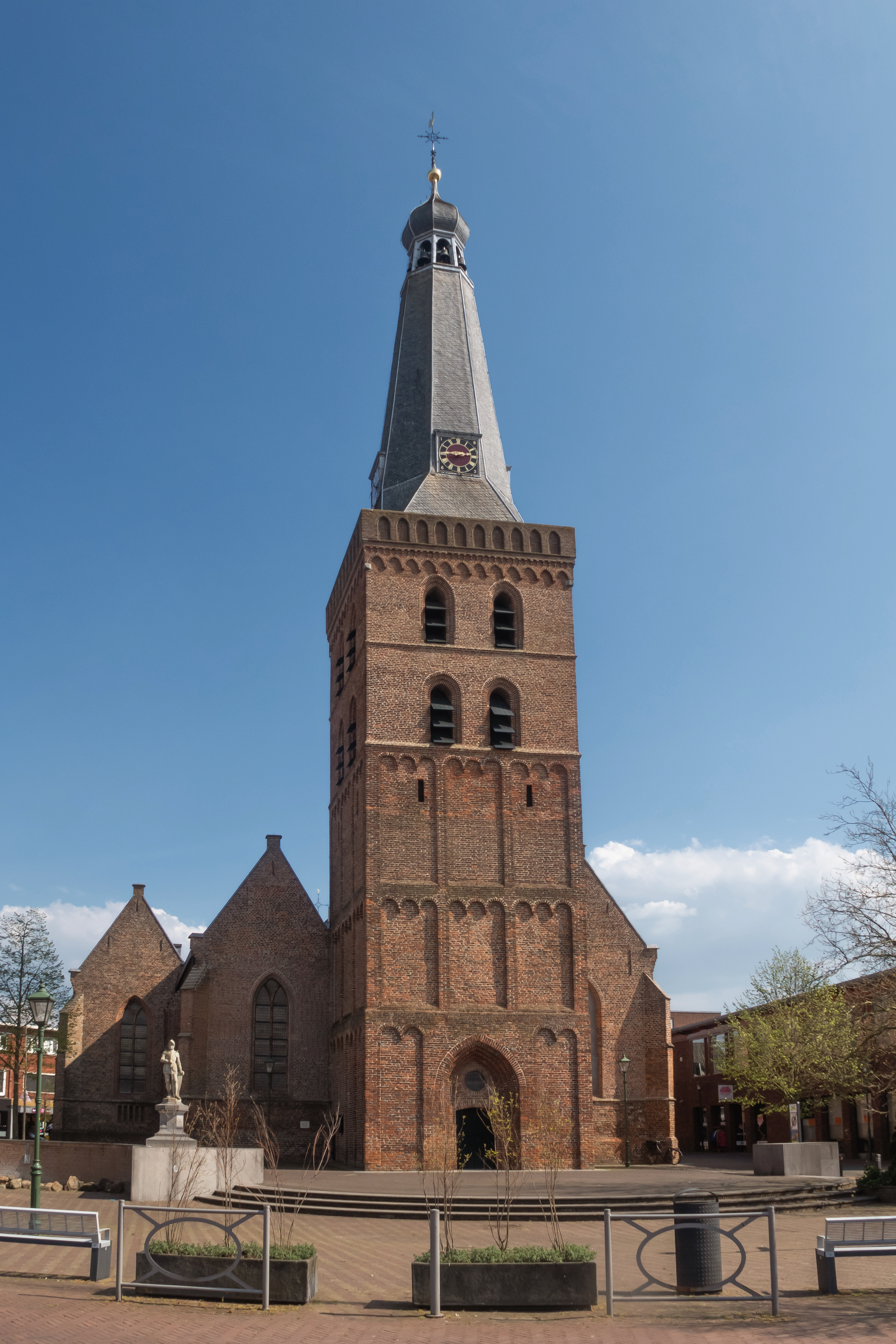
- Church in Barneveld

- Flag Coat of arms

- Location in Gelderland
- Coordinates: 52°8′N 5°35′E
- Country: Netherlands
- Province: Gelderland

Government
  - Body: Municipal council
  - Mayor: Jacco van der Tak (CDA)

Area
  - Total: 176.66 km^{2} (68.21 sq mi)
  - Land: 175.90 km^{2} (67.92 sq mi)
  - Water: 0.76 km^{2} (0.29 sq mi)
- Elevation: 10 m (33 ft)

Population (January 2021)
  - Total: 59,992
  - Density: 341/km^{2} (880/sq mi)
- Demonym: Barnevelder
- Time zone: UTC+1 (CET)
  - Summer (DST): UTC+2 (CEST)
- Postcode: 3770–3785, 3794, 3886
- Area code: 0342, 0577
- Website: www.barneveld.nl

Barneveld (Dutch pronunciation: [ˈbɑrnəˌvɛlt]) is a municipality in the province of Gelderland in the center of the Netherlands. It is known for its poultry industry and large Protestant community. The municipality had a population of 59,992 in 2021, out of which 33,800 (2018) lived in the town itself.

Barneveld is estimated to be over 800 years old. This estimation is based on a text from 1174 in which a Wolfram van Barneveld is named.

== Population centres ==
- Barneveld (town)
- De Glind
- Garderen
- Kootwijk
- Kootwijkerbroek
- Stroe
- Terschuur
- Voorthuizen
- Zwartebroek

== Notable people ==
- Jan van Schaffelaar (ca.1445–1482) a cavalry officer in the duchy of Guelders
- Hendrik Jansen van Barrefelt (ca.1520–ca.1594) a weaver, a Christian mystic and author
- Jan Everts Bout (1601/1602 – 1671) an early Dutch settler in the New Netherland
- Jacobus Kapteyn FRS FRSE LLD (1851–1922) a Dutch astronomer
- Eduard Daniël van Oort (1876–1933) a Dutch ornithologist
- Simeon Gottfried Albert Doorenbos (1891–1980) a Dutch horticulturist, Director of The Hague Parks Department 1927/1957
- Chris van Veen (1922–2009) a Dutch politician and trade association executive
- Hans Van de Bovenkamp (born 1938 in Garderen) a Dutch-born American sculptor

=== Sport ===
- Conny van Bentum (born 1965) a female former butterfly and freestyle swimmer, three time Olympic relay team medallist
- Alfred Schreuder (born 1972) a Dutch football manager and former player with over 350 club caps
- Johan Jansen (born 1989) a Dutch professional football goalkeeper, 226 club caps with GVVV

== Gallery ==
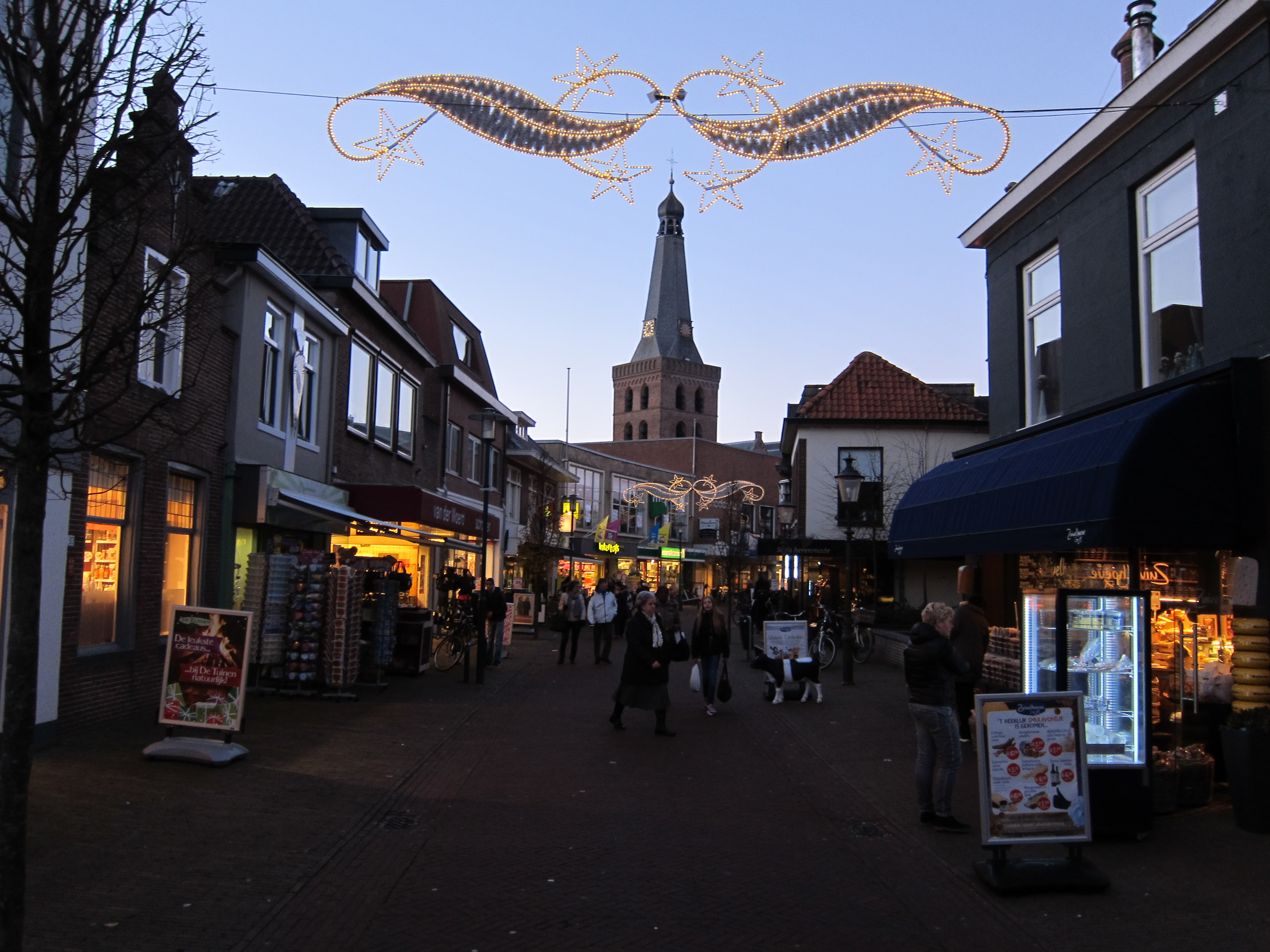
Barneveld

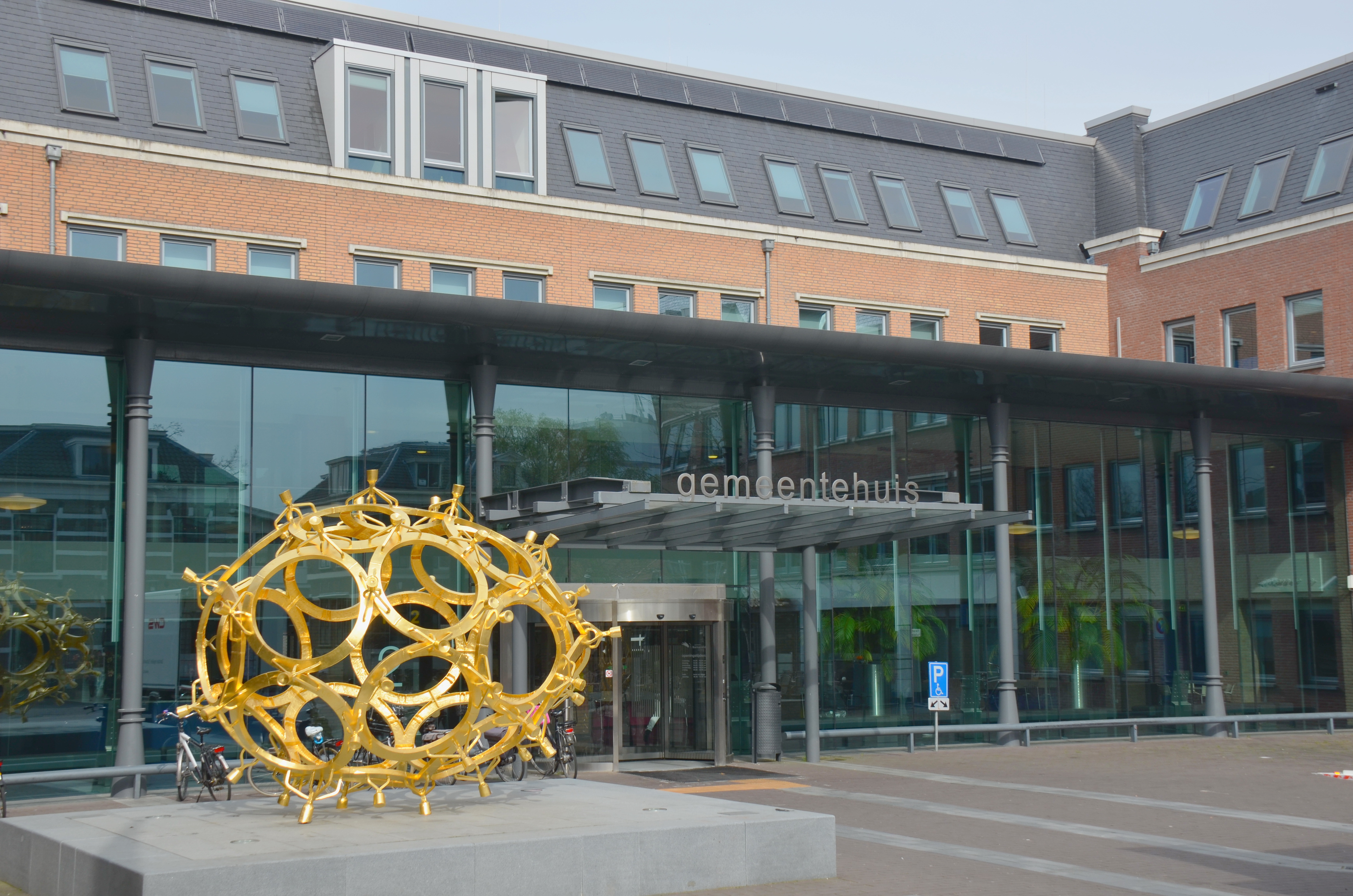
The new townhall Barneveld with its golden egg

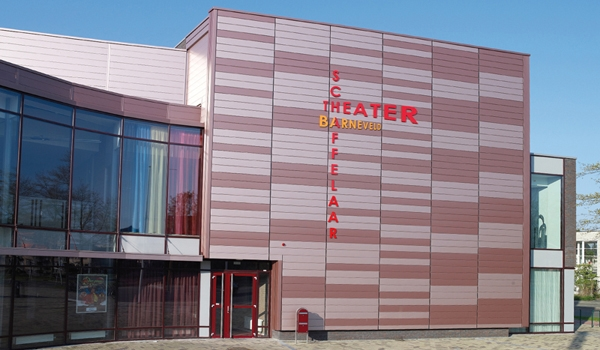
Aluform theater, Barneveld

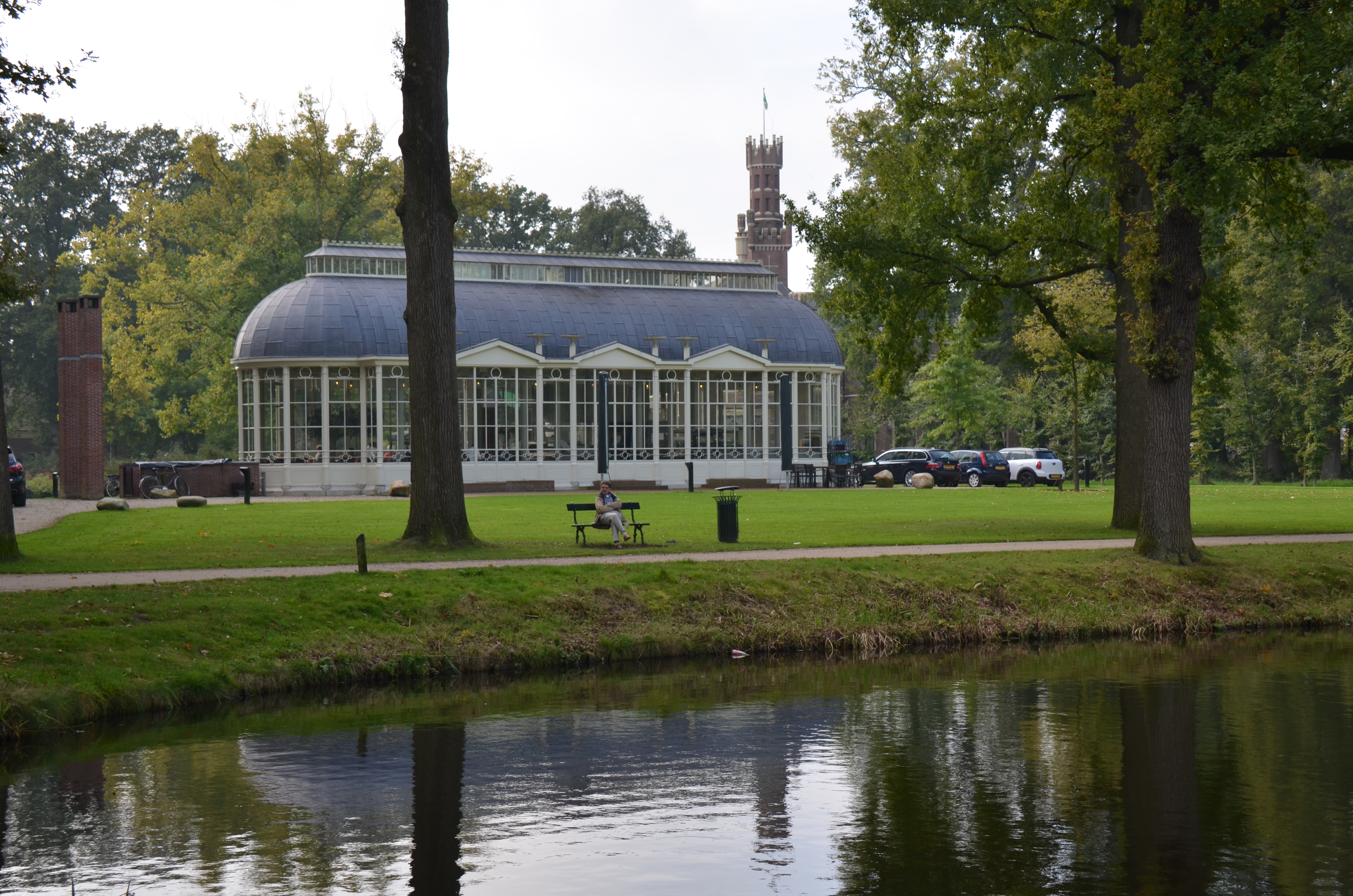
Restaurant at Nature Park Schaffelaar Barneveld
