= Kootwijkerbroek =

Kootwijkerboek
- Village
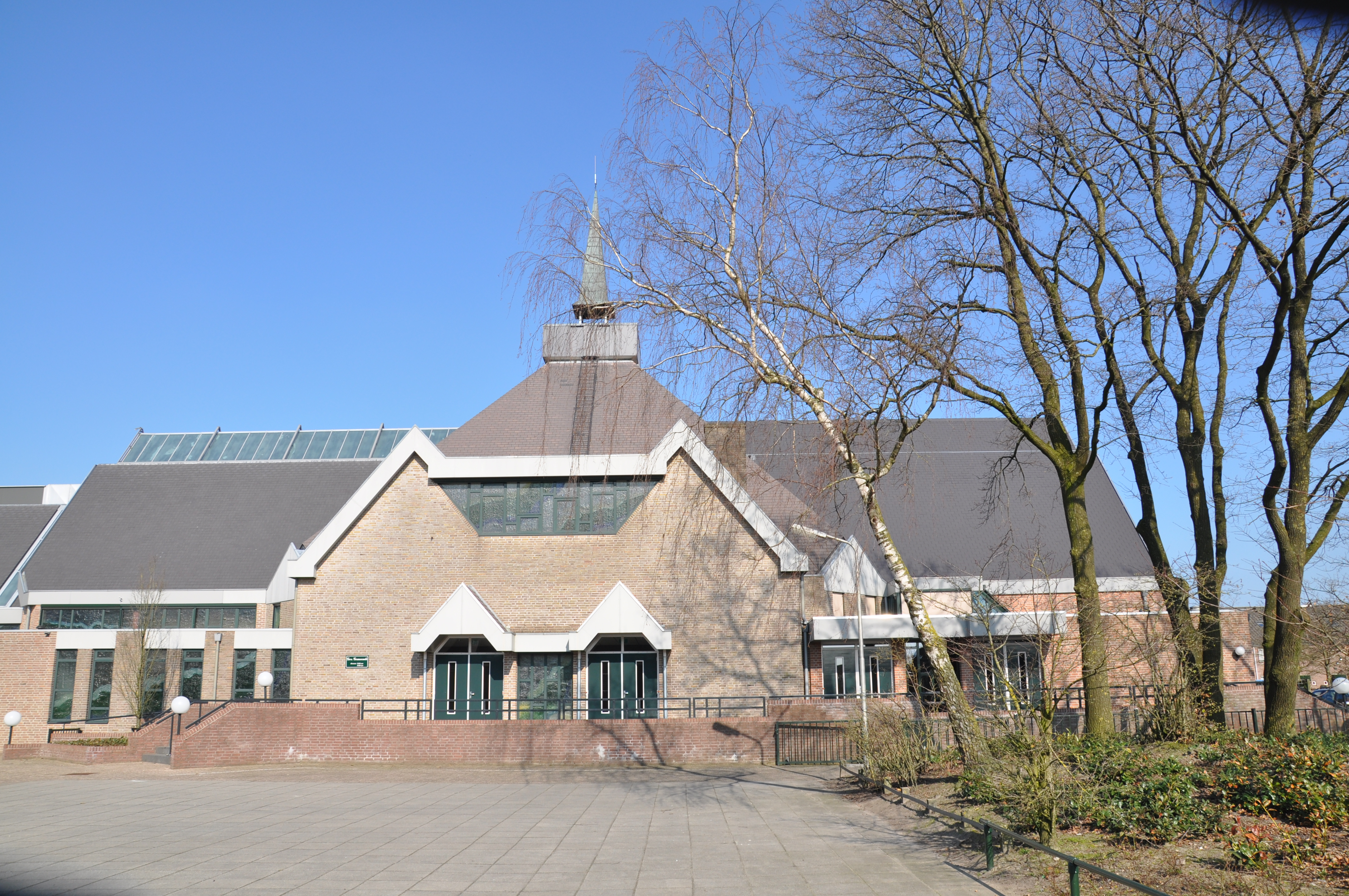
- The church of the Reformed Congregations. (1,750 seats)

- Flag

- Location in the province of Gelderland Kootwijkerboek (Netherlands)
- Coordinates: 52°09′N 5°40′E
- Country: Netherlands
- Province: Gelderland
- Municipality: Barneveld

Area
  - Total: 24.74 km^{2} (9.55 sq mi)
- Elevation: 16 m (52 ft)

Population (2021)
  - Total: 5,740
  - Density: 232/km^{2} (601/sq mi)
- Time zone: UTC+1 (CET)
  - Summer (DST): UTC+2 (CEST)
- Postal code: 3774
- Dialing code: 0342

Kootwijkerbroek is a village in the Netherlands, on the Veluwe, in the municipality of Barneveld, Gelderland, Netherlands. The village, situated in the Gelderland Valley, east of Barneveld, has a major agricultural role in this part of the valley with most of the 157 companies located in Kootwijkerbroek involved in agriculture and industry. Kootwijkerbroek is an old village just between Kootwijk and Barneveld, with many generations traditionally involved in milling. The last mill burnt down in 1964, however it was rebuilt in 2015. On the edge of the village, there is a church with a beautiful old vicarage surrounded by an attractive garden park with ponds.

Kootwijkerbroek is a conservative Protestant village, located on the Dutch Bible Belt. In the 2010 municipal elections, 52 percent of the local population voted for the Reformed Political Party (SGP). The three Christian parties in the elections (the Reformed Political Party, the ChristianUnion and the Christian Democratic Appeal) had a combined total of almost 70 percent of the votes. Many of the socio demographic indicators reflect the conservative nature of the community, with relatively larger household families with young children and low divorce rates.

Hundreds of farmers protested in 2001 in the village of Kootwijkerbroek. They tried to prevent the slaughter of healthy cattle as a result of foot-and-mouth disease restrictions. The farmers never accepted the verdict by the authorities that the disease had spread to the 'Teunissen' farm, as the alleged outbreak never spread beyond the suspected veal calf operation. In every other outbreak location in 2001, other surrounding farms were infected with animals showing evidence of the infection. The blockade involved about 200 farmers and was the largest protest related to the foot-and-mouth epidemic in the Netherlands.
