= Zwartebroek =

- Village
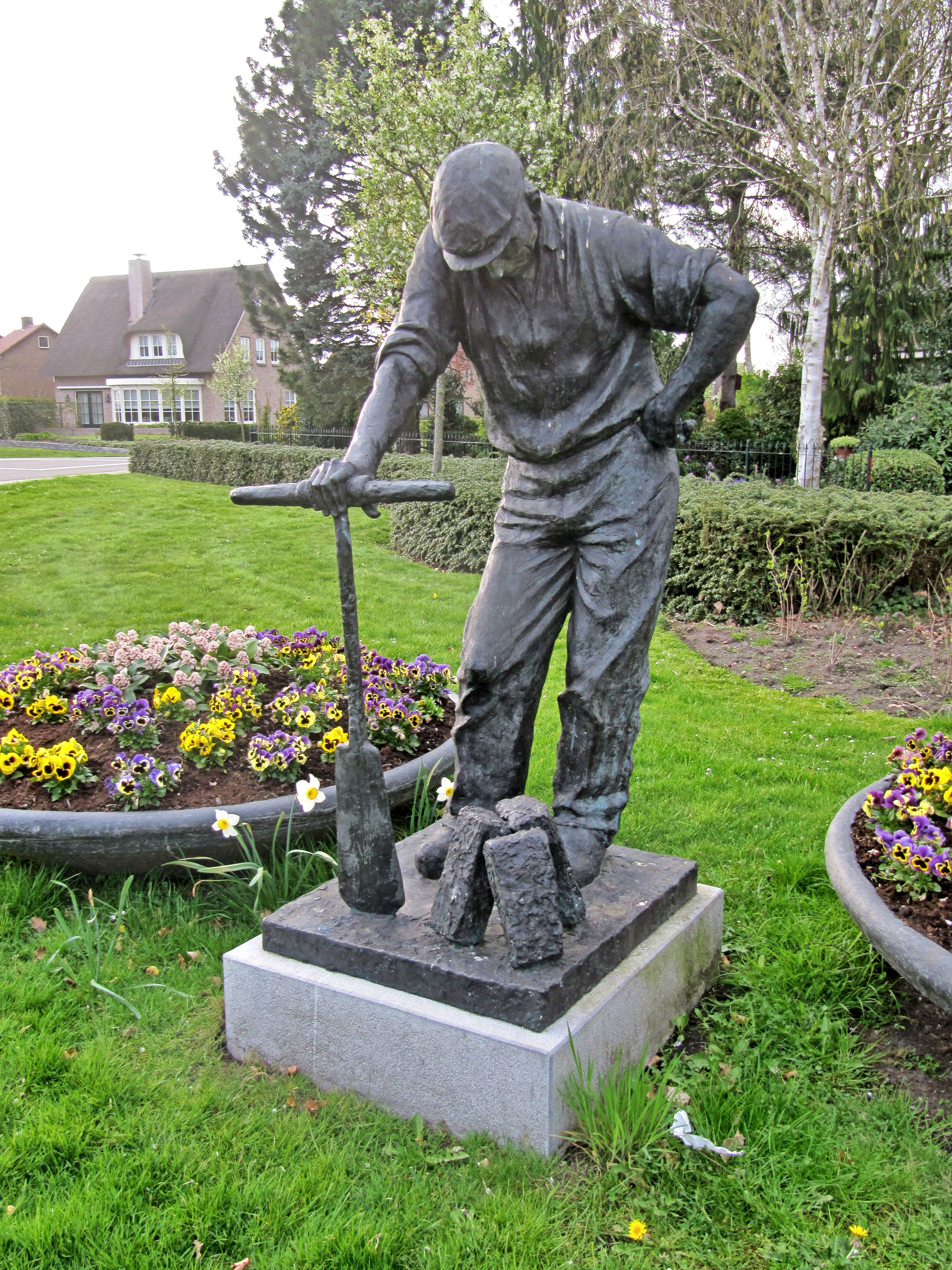
- De Turfsteker, famous statue in Zwartebroek

- Location in the Netherlands Zwartebroek (Netherlands)
- Coordinates: 52°10′41″N 5°30′21″E
- Country: Netherlands
- Province: Gelderland
- Municipality: Barneveld

Area
  - Total: 7.17 km^{2} (2.77 sq mi)
- Elevation: 7 m (23 ft)

Population (2021)
  - Total: 1,440
  - Density: 201/km^{2} (520/sq mi)
- Time zone: UTC+1 (CET)
  - Summer (DST): UTC+2 (CEST)
- Postal code: 3785
- Dialing code: 0342
- Website: http://www.terbroek.nl/

Zwartebroek is a village in the municipality of Barneveld in the Dutch province of Gelderland.

The village is situated on the Veluwe. It lies north of Terschuur and east of Hoevelaken. Like its neighbour Nijkerkerveen, Zwartebroek was founded as a result of the peat extraction in the area.

In 1840, it was home to 596 people. In 1850, a church was built in the village.

== Etymology ==
The name Zwartebroek is a combination of the words zwart and broek. Broek is the Dutch term for wet or swampy land. Zwart is the Dutch word for black and might be a reference to the dark color of the land. Broek is also the Dutch word for trousers, but this common translation is incorrect.
