= De Glind =

- Village
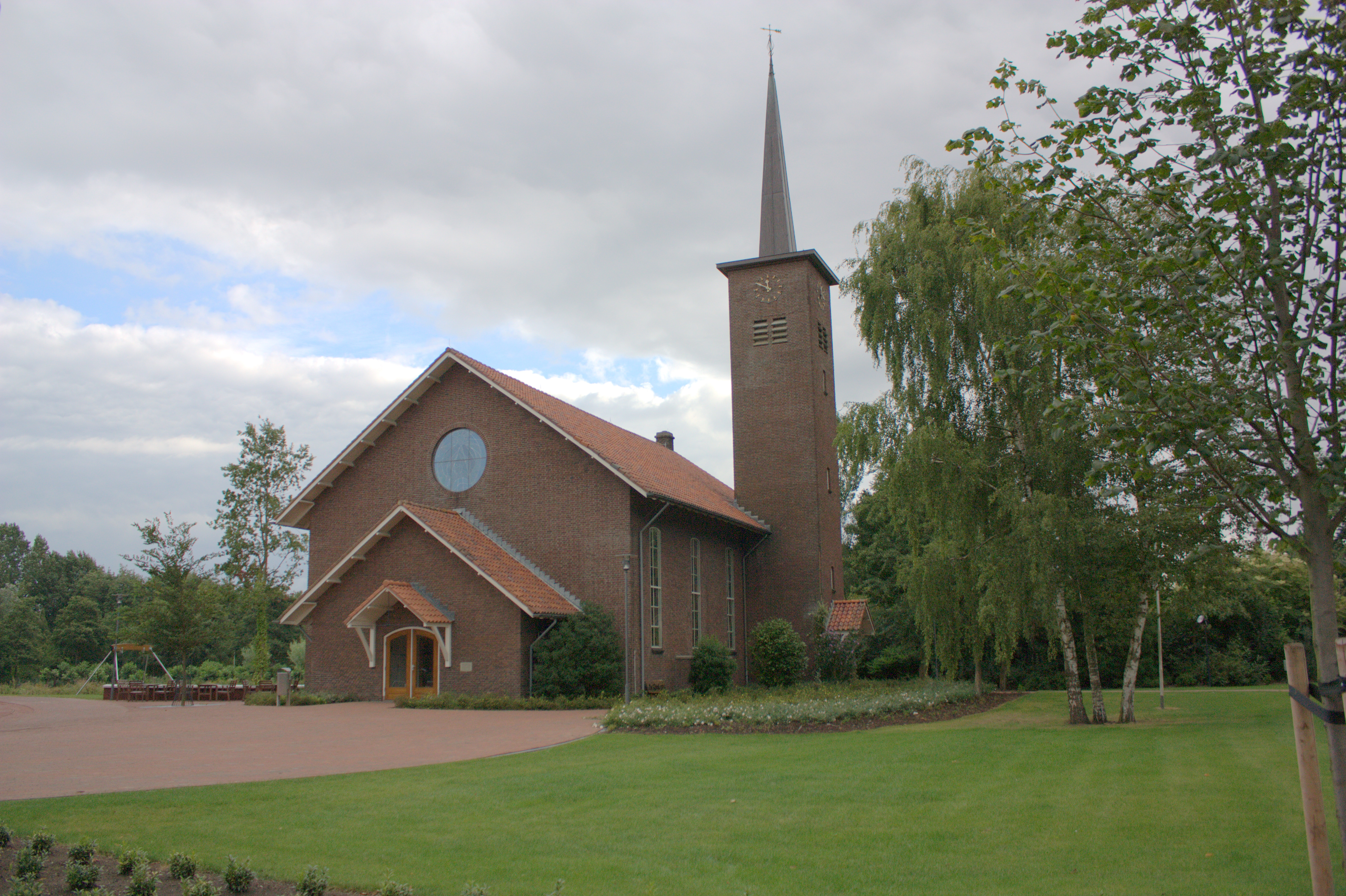
- Church of De Glind

- Location in the province of Gelderland De Glind (Netherlands)
- Coordinates: 52°7′9″N 5°30′23″E
- Country: Netherlands
- Province: Gelderland
- Municipality: Barneveld

Area
  - Total: 6.15 km^{2} (2.37 sq mi)
- Elevation: 6 m (20 ft)

Population (2021)
  - Total: 620
  - Density: 100/km^{2} (260/sq mi)
- Time zone: UTC+1 (CET)
  - Summer (DST): UTC+2 (CEST)
- Postal code: 3794
- Dialing code: 0342

De Glind is a village near Barneveld in the middle of Netherlands, in the province Gelderland.

== History ==
It was first mentioned in 1321 as Ghelinde, and means "fenced off terrain". The havezate Glinthorst was mentioned for the first time in 1325. It was demolished around 1780. In 1840, it was home to 498 people. In 1916, a church was built in De Glind.

In 1911, Foundation De Glindhorst was established by Roelof Jan Willem Rudolph and a village for disadvantaged youth was built. Farmers could rent a piece of land, but were obliged to take care of children. The youth village still exists, and is nowadays operated by the Rudolph Foundation.

== Gallery ==
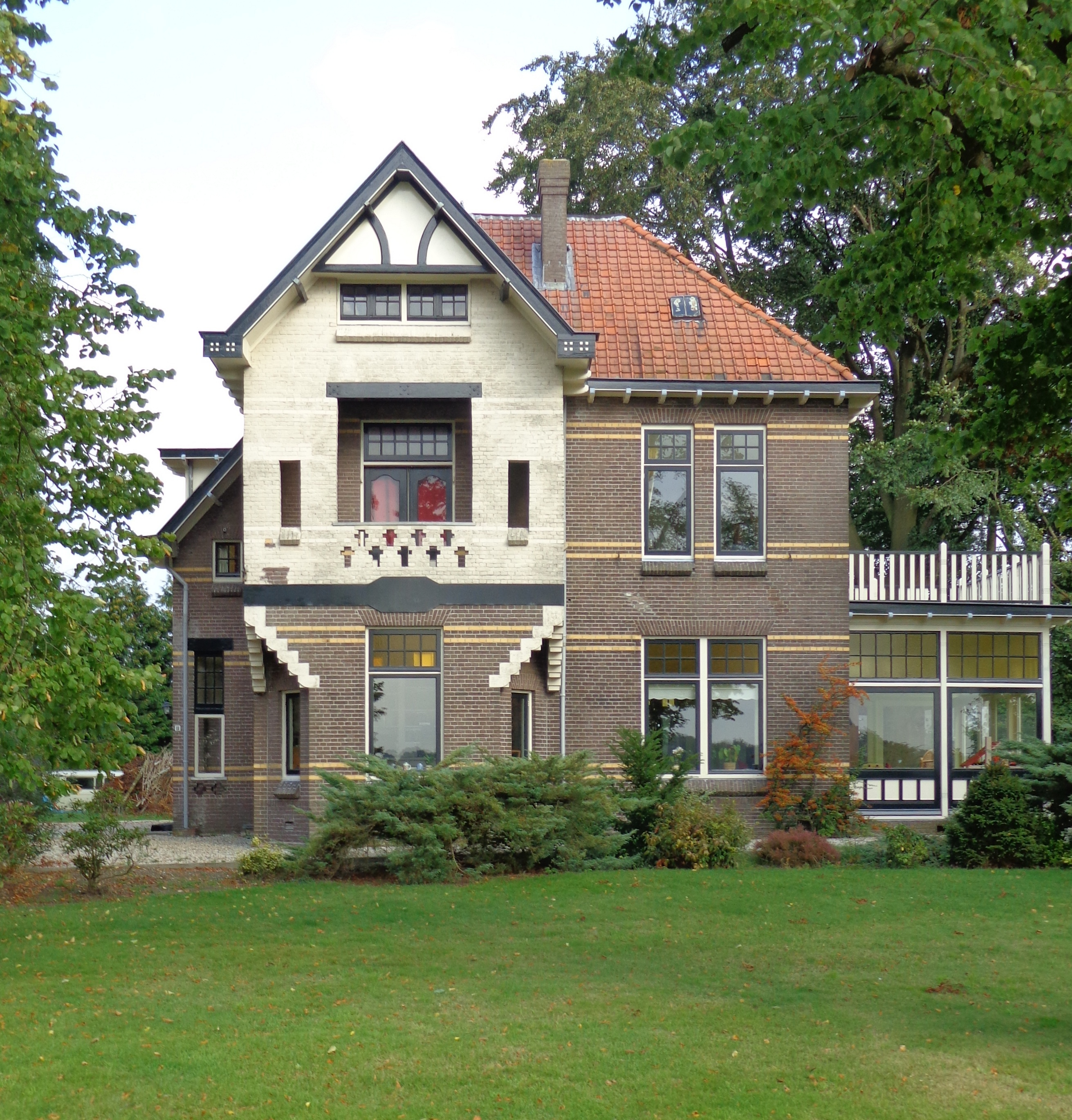
House in De Glind

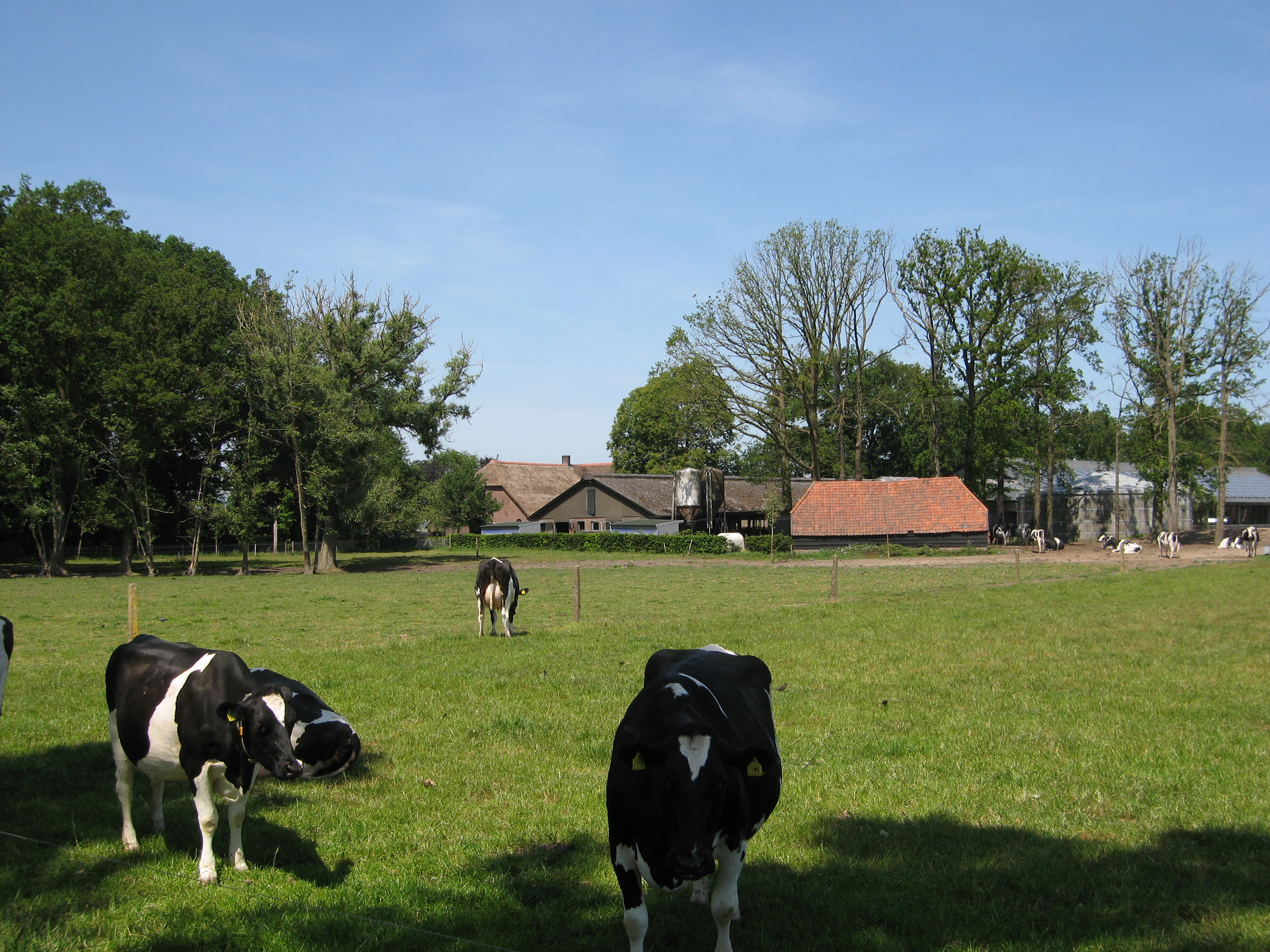
Cows with a farm in the background

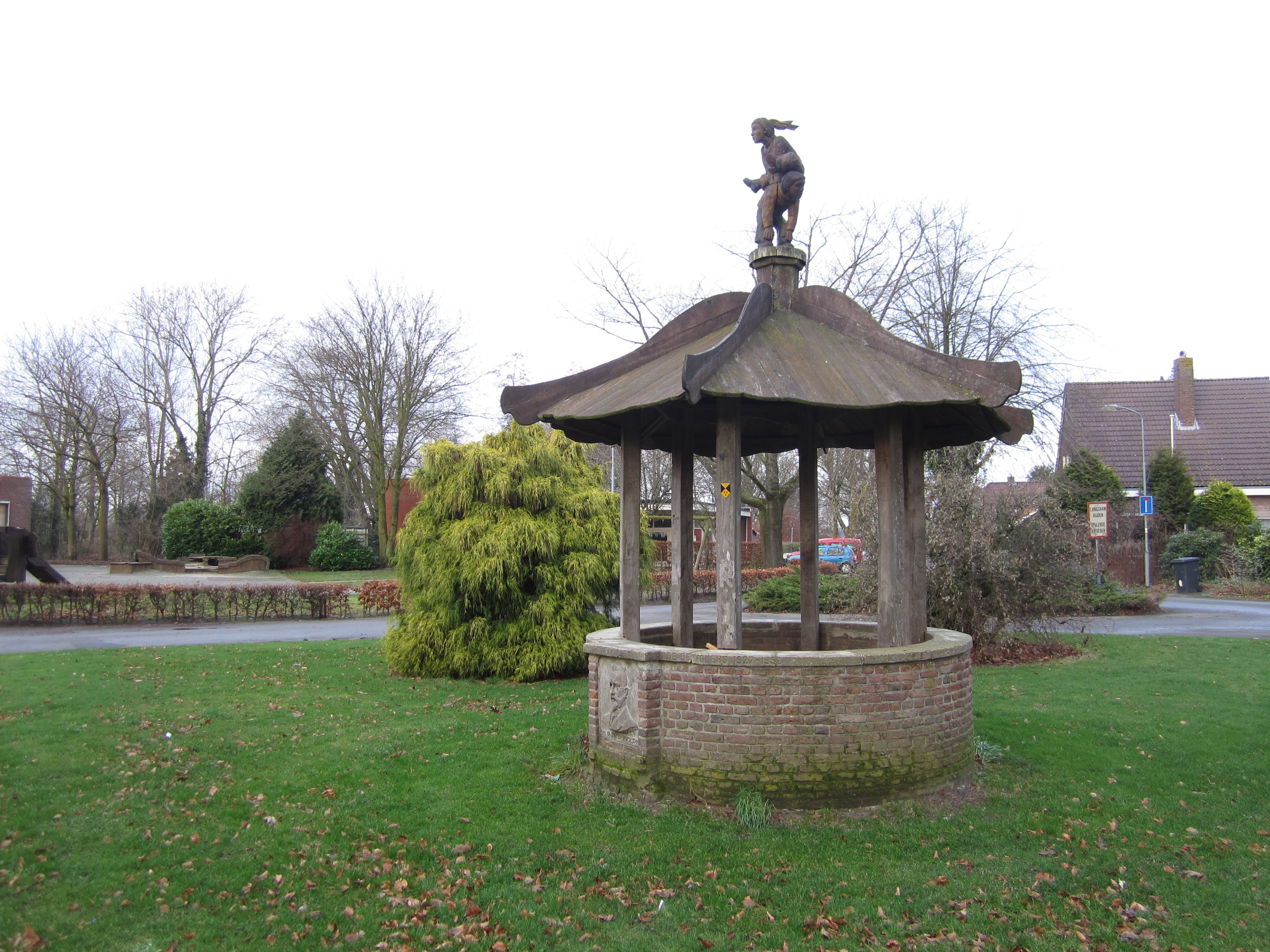
Remembrance water well

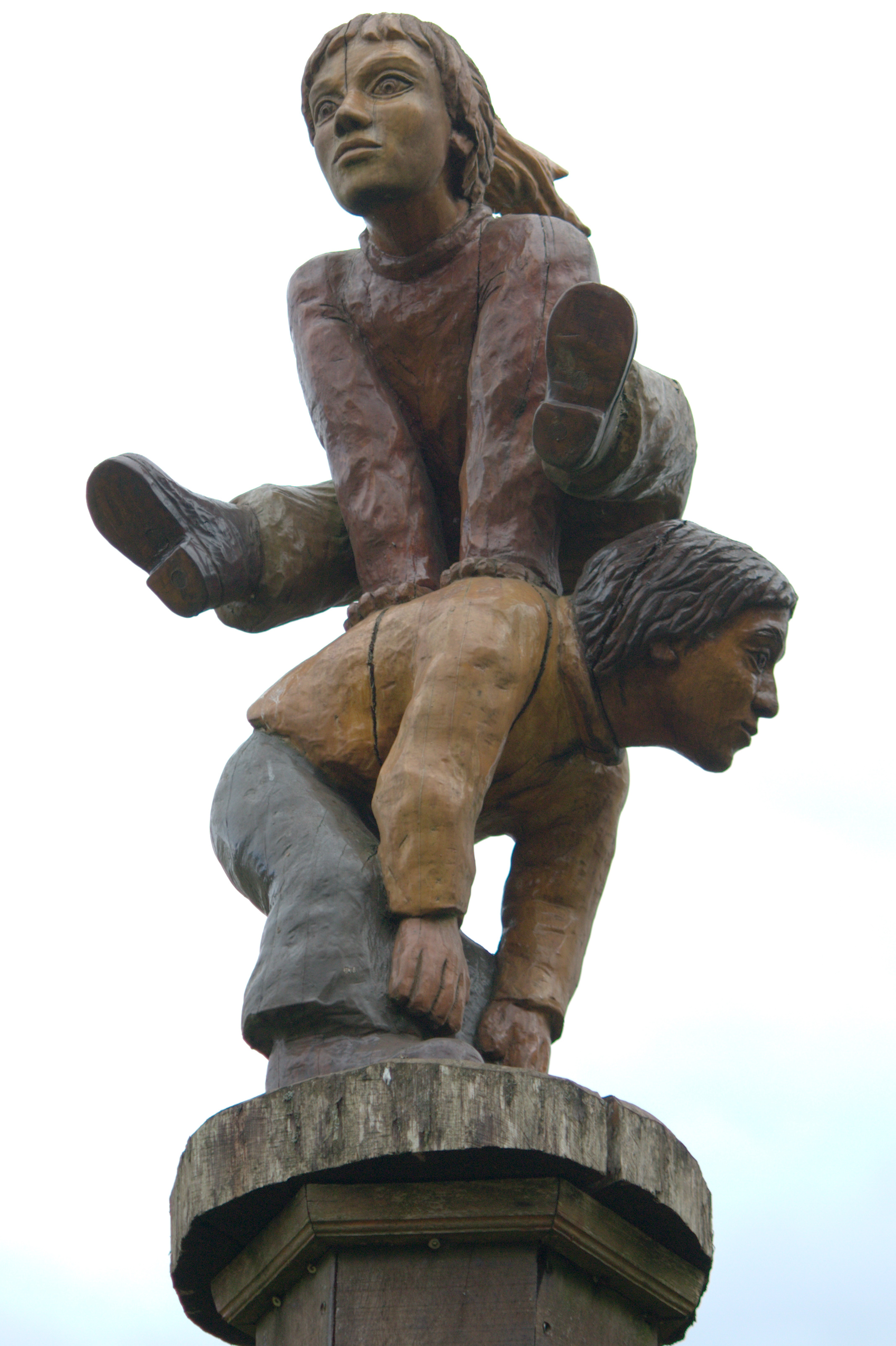
Leapfrog detail
