= Voorthuizen =

- Village
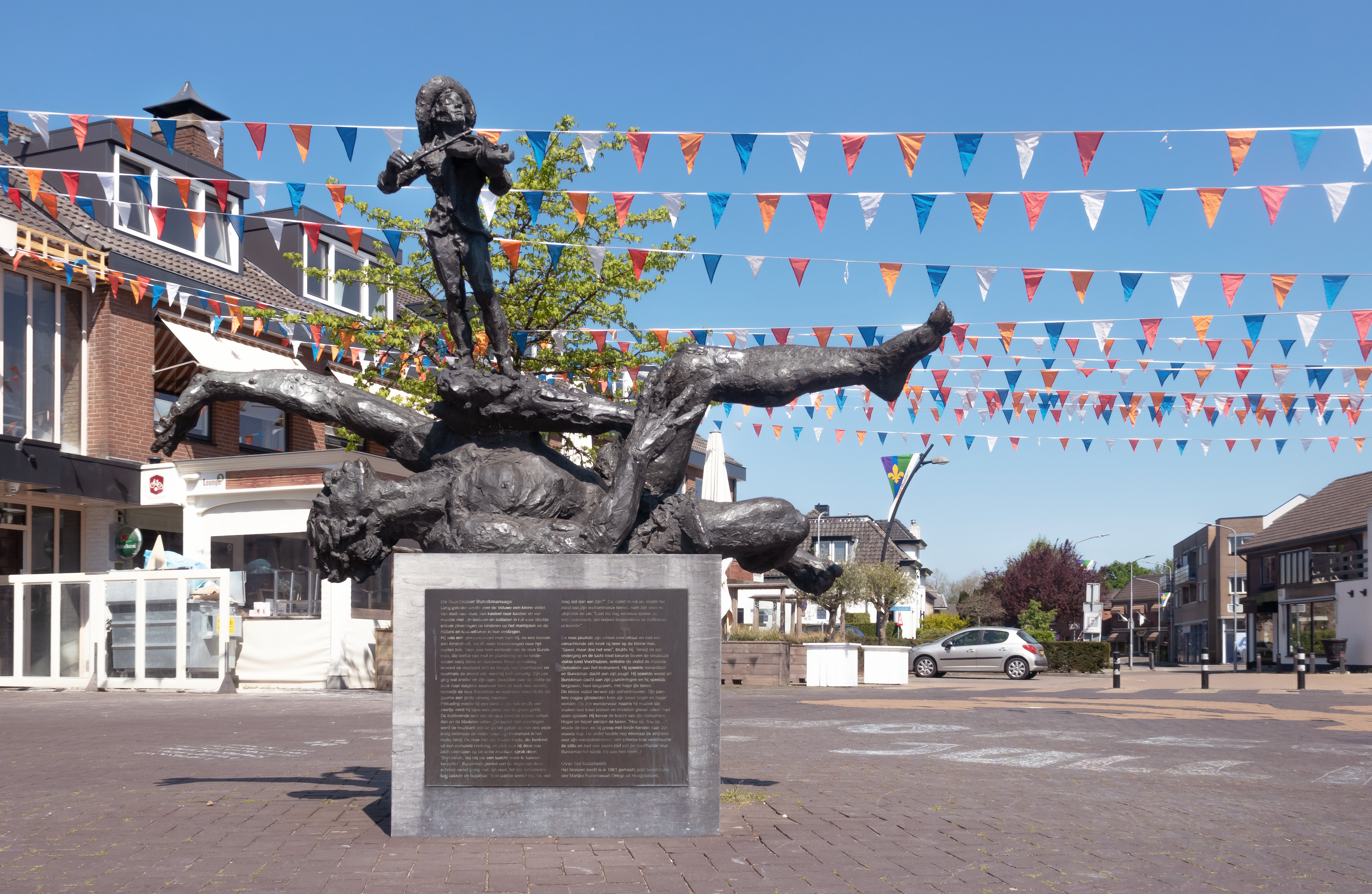
- Sculpture: the Voorthuizer Bunckmansage

- Flag

- Location in the province of Gelderland in the Netherlands Voorthuizen (Netherlands)
- Coordinates: 52°11′10″N 5°36′24″E
- Country: Netherlands
- Province: Gelderland
- Municipality: Barneveld

Area
  - Total: 23.37 km^{2} (9.02 sq mi)
- Elevation: 13 m (43 ft)

Population (2021)
  - Total: 11,340
  - Density: 485.2/km^{2} (1,257/sq mi)
- Time zone: UTC+1 (CET)
  - Summer (DST): UTC+2 (CEST)
- Postal code: 3781
- Dialing code: 0342
- Major roads: A1 N303 N344

Voorthuizen (Dutch Low Saxon: Voorthuzen) is a village in the municipality of Barneveld, in the Dutch province of Gelderland.

== Tourism ==
Voorthuizen is a tourist village, located on the edge of the Veluwe. East of the village is a high concentration of campsites. To the southeast, on the A1, lies the Zeumeren recreation area, which attracts around 400,000 visitors per year. The tourist season has been opened since 2014 with a one-day event, "Voorthuizen Straalt!".

== History ==
Voorthuizen was founded, according to legend, near a crossing of a ford ('Voorde') of the Ganzenbeek, a brook that no longer exists, on the road from Amsterdam to Deventer. This road was called a "Hessenweg" ('Hessian road') because seasonal workers from Westphalia would travel along this road into the Netherlands. Another important road that lead through this place was the trade route from Harderwijk to Wageningen. This made Voorthuizen an important stop along these two routes.

A new high road was commissioned and built by King Louis Bonaparte in 1809, which actually divided up the village. During the 20th century, traffic along this route through the center of the village increased, and a new main road was built in 1972, south of the village.

Voorthuizen was a separate municipality between 1812 and 1818.

Near the end of World War II, many buildings in the village were heavily damaged due to an engagement between Canadian and German troops on 16-17 April 1945. In 1999, the Seaforth Highlanders of Holland pipe and drum band was founded to commemorate the liberation of the village in 1945 by the Seaforth Highlanders of British Columbia.

Due to the increase of the military after the war, the number of military bases and garrisons was rapidly expanded, among others the nearby military base "De Wittenberg" in Garderen/Stroe (renamed Generaal Majoor Koot Kazerne in 1978), and a mobilization complex at the Garderbroekerweg in Voorthuizen. The influx of military personnel led to the expansion of the village in the early 1950s; one of these new neighborhoods that housed many servicemen -located according to rank,- soon was nicknamed "Klein Korea" ('Little Korea'). These new inhabitants, and others that followed, lead to a shift in the population, from traditional agricultural workers to a broader oriented populace, making Voorthuizen one of the more progressive villages in the municipality.

== Religion ==
There are several churches in Voorthuizen, such as a number of Reformed Churches, the Roman Catholic Church, the New Apostolic Church and the Evangelical congregations of the Open Hof, the Kandelaar and Life. Since 2009, every year - on the fourth Sunday of June - all churches in Voorthuizen hold a joint open air service.

== Gallery ==
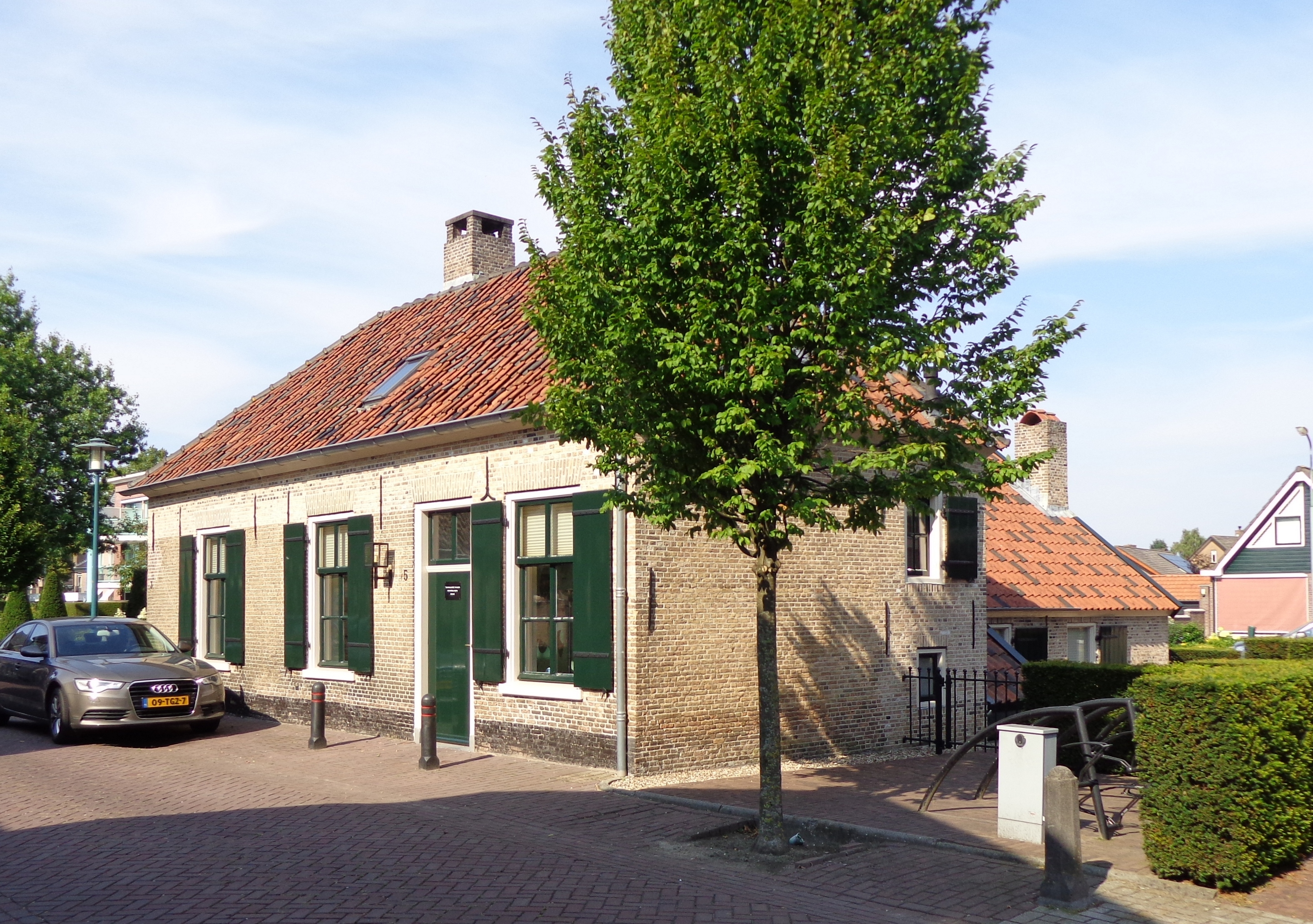
House in Voorthuizen

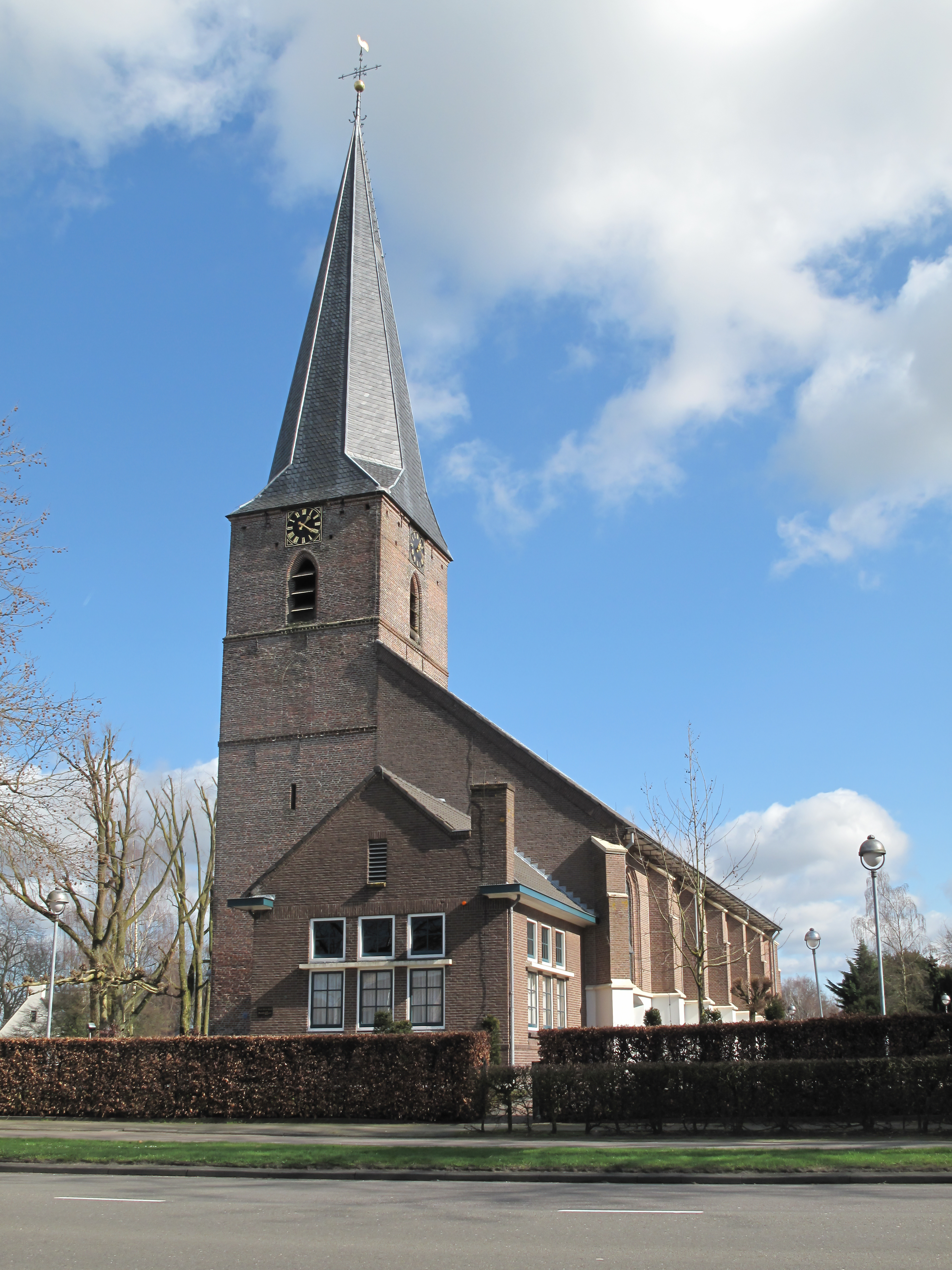
The Dutch Reformed Church on the Kerkstraat

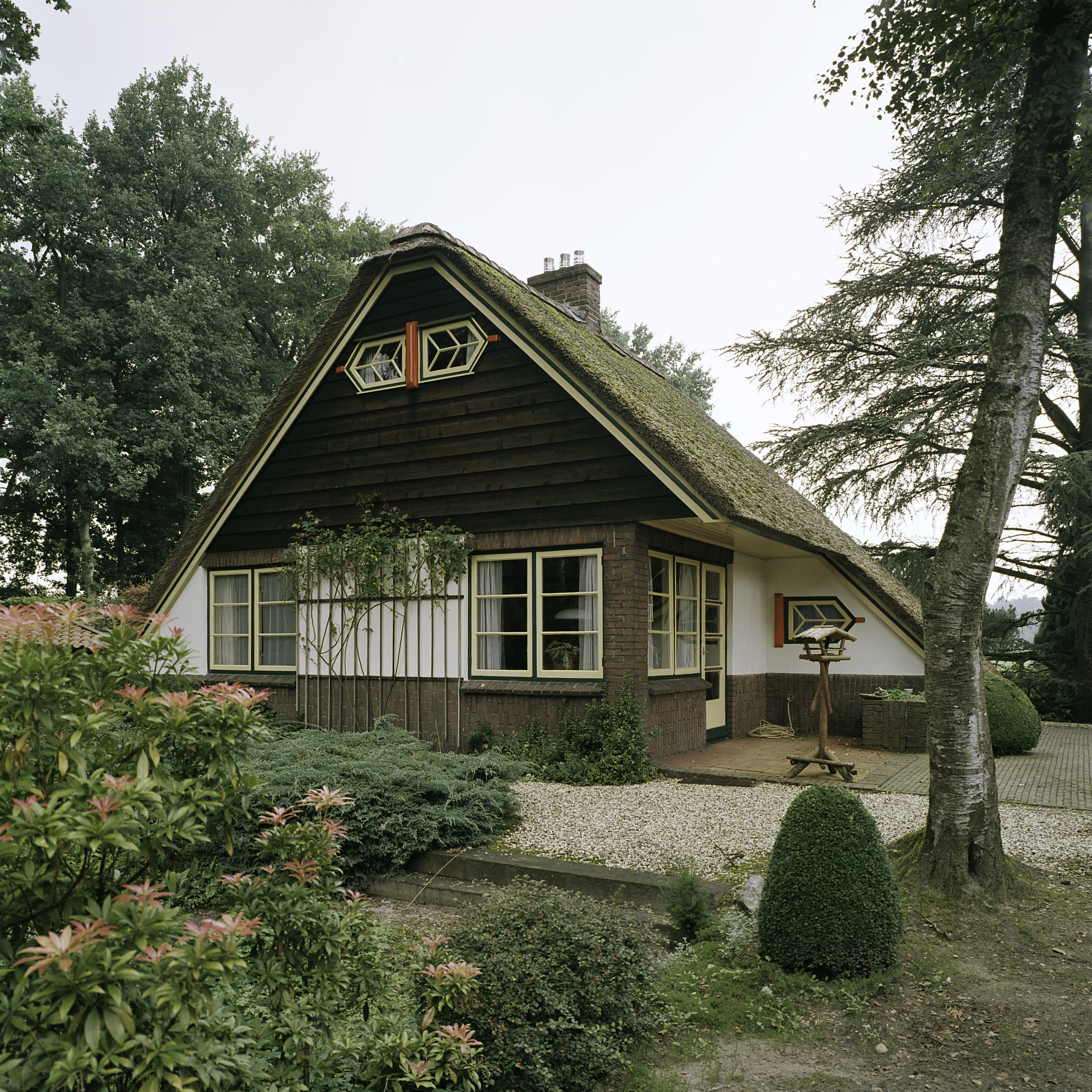
House in Voorthuizen

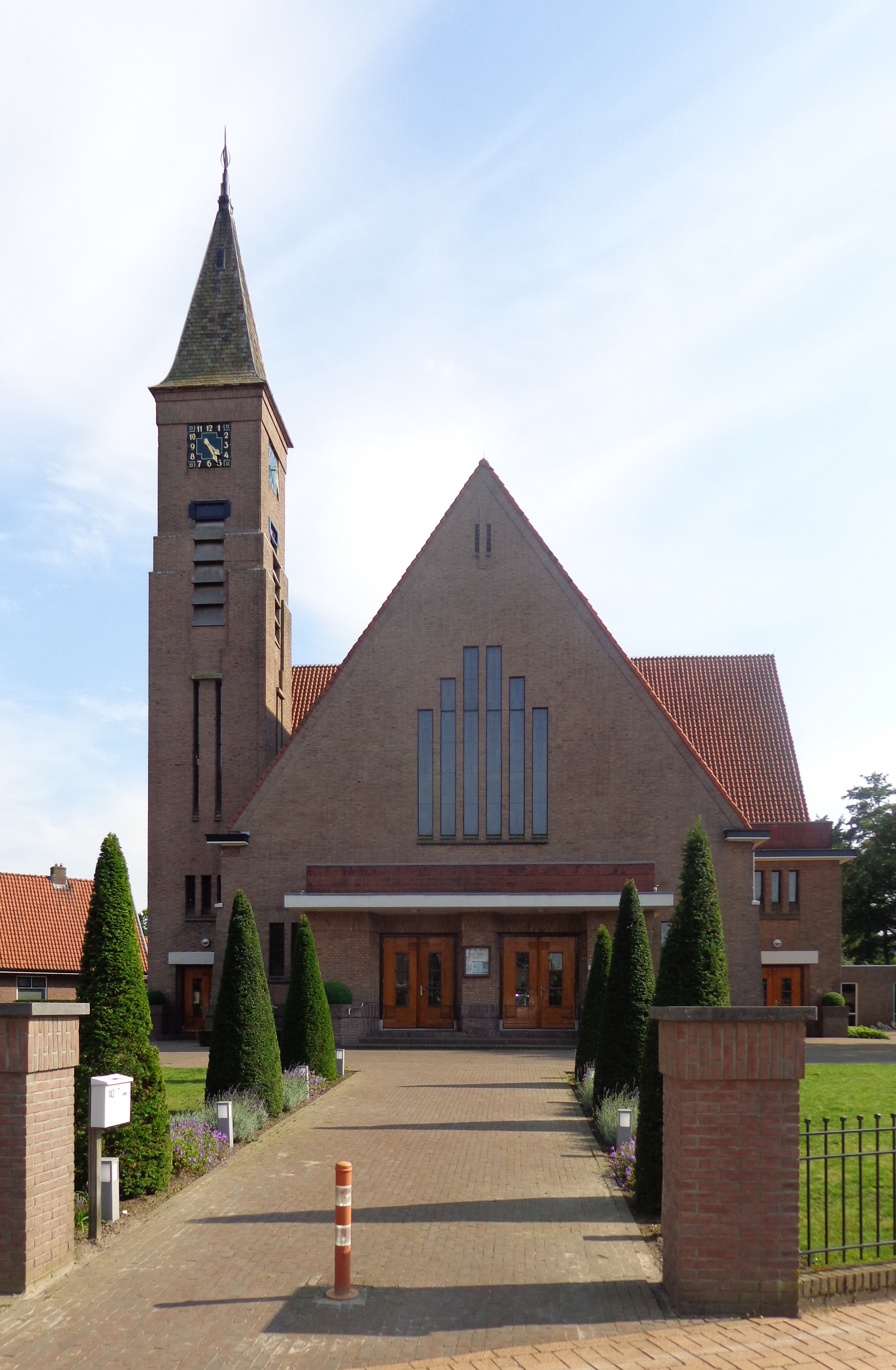
Reformed Church on the Hoofdstraat

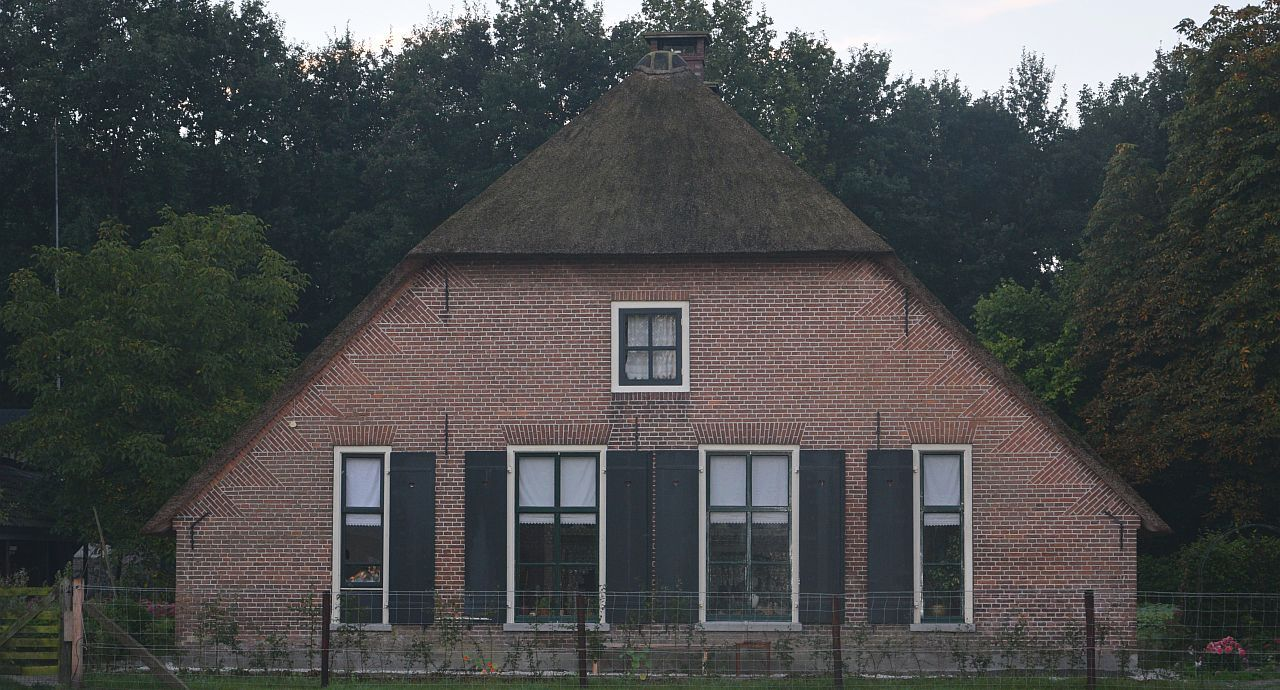
Farm in Voorhuizen
