= Terschuur =

- Village
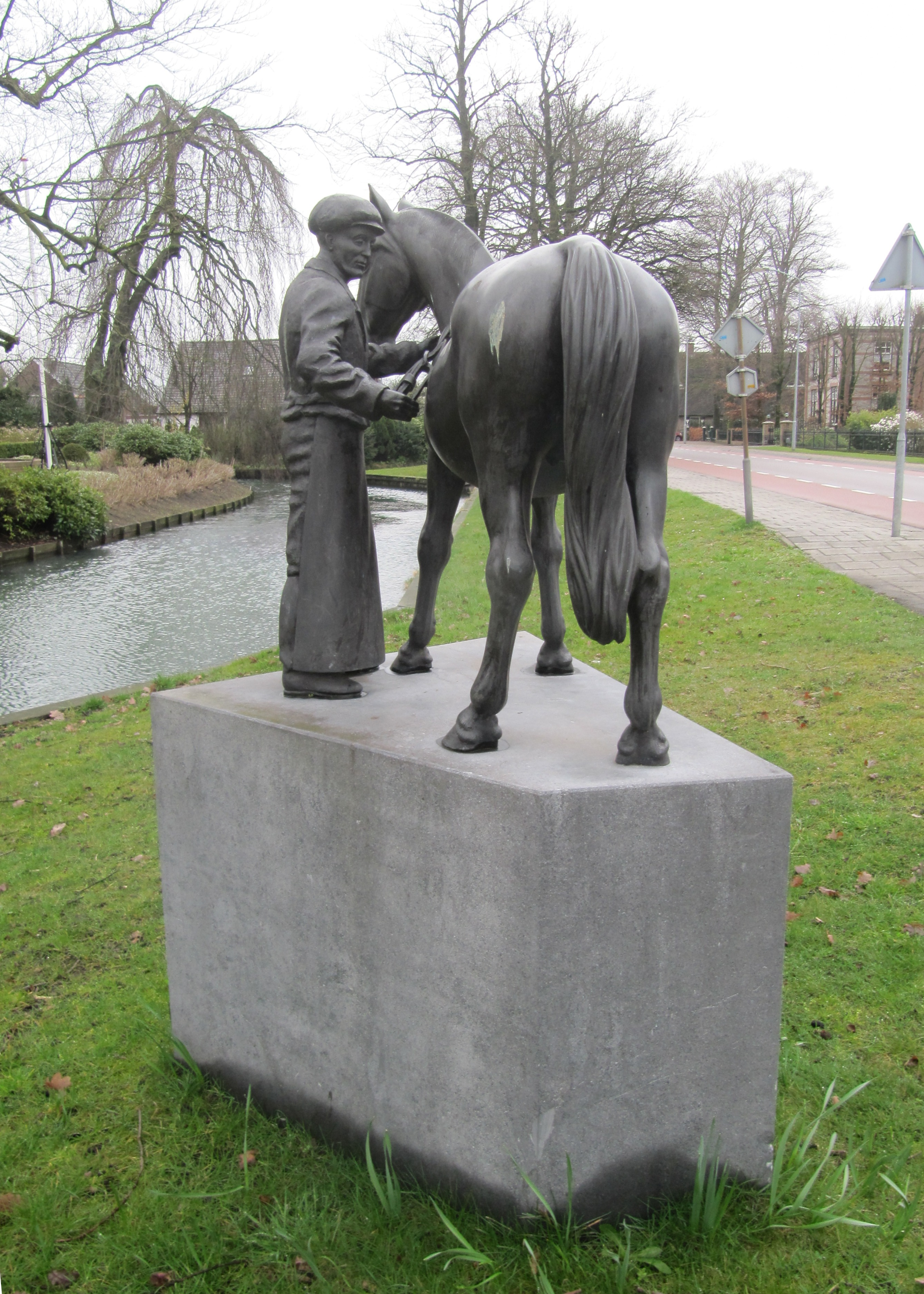

- Location in the Netherlands Terschuur (Netherlands)
- Coordinates: 52.1634°N 5.5176°E
- Country: Netherlands
- Province: Gelderland
- Municipality: Barneveld

Area
  - Total: 13.43 km^{2} (5.19 sq mi)
- Elevation: 6 m (20 ft)

Population (2021)
  - Total: 1,505
  - Density: 112.1/km^{2} (290.2/sq mi)
- Time zone: UTC+1 (CET)
  - Summer (DST): UTC+2 (CEST)
- Postal code: 3784
- Dialing code: 0342

Terschuur is a village in the Dutch province of Gelderland. It is located in the municipality of Barneveld.

== History ==
It was first mentioned around 1400 as "den teende ther schuren", and means "at the barn". Terschuur used to part of Zwartebroek. The village developed on the road from Amsterdam to Amersfoort. There used to be a toll house at the village. In 1421, the toll house was burnt down by angry citizens. The estate Terschuur which was built around 1830. The windmill Den Olden Florus is from 1881, but a predecessor used to be at the location before 1635.

From 1888 until 1931 there was a railway stop at Terschuur. In 1930, it became a separate village.

== Notable people ==
- Johan Jansen (born 1989), professional footballer

== Gallery ==
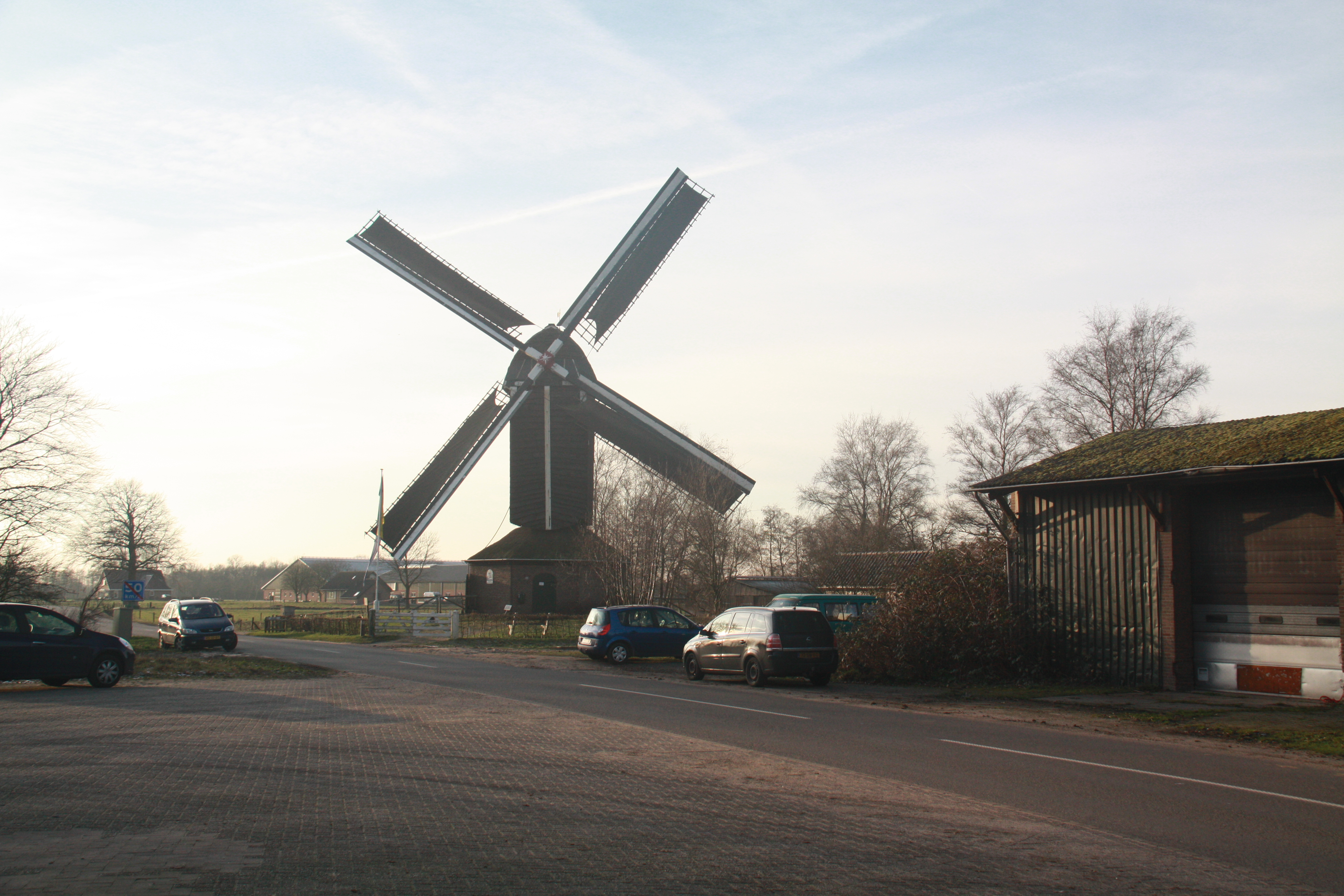
Windmill "Den Olden Florus"

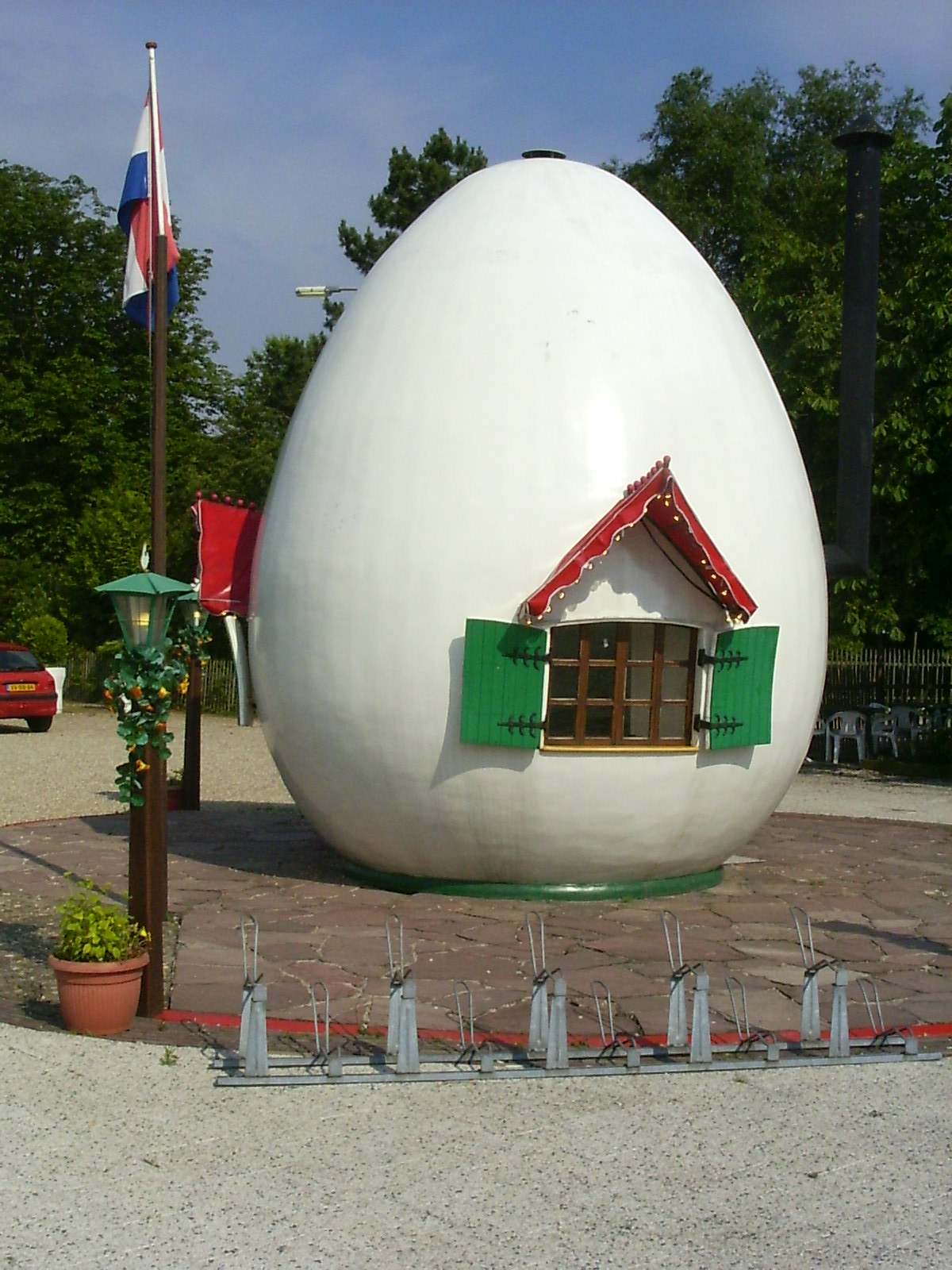
Egg house

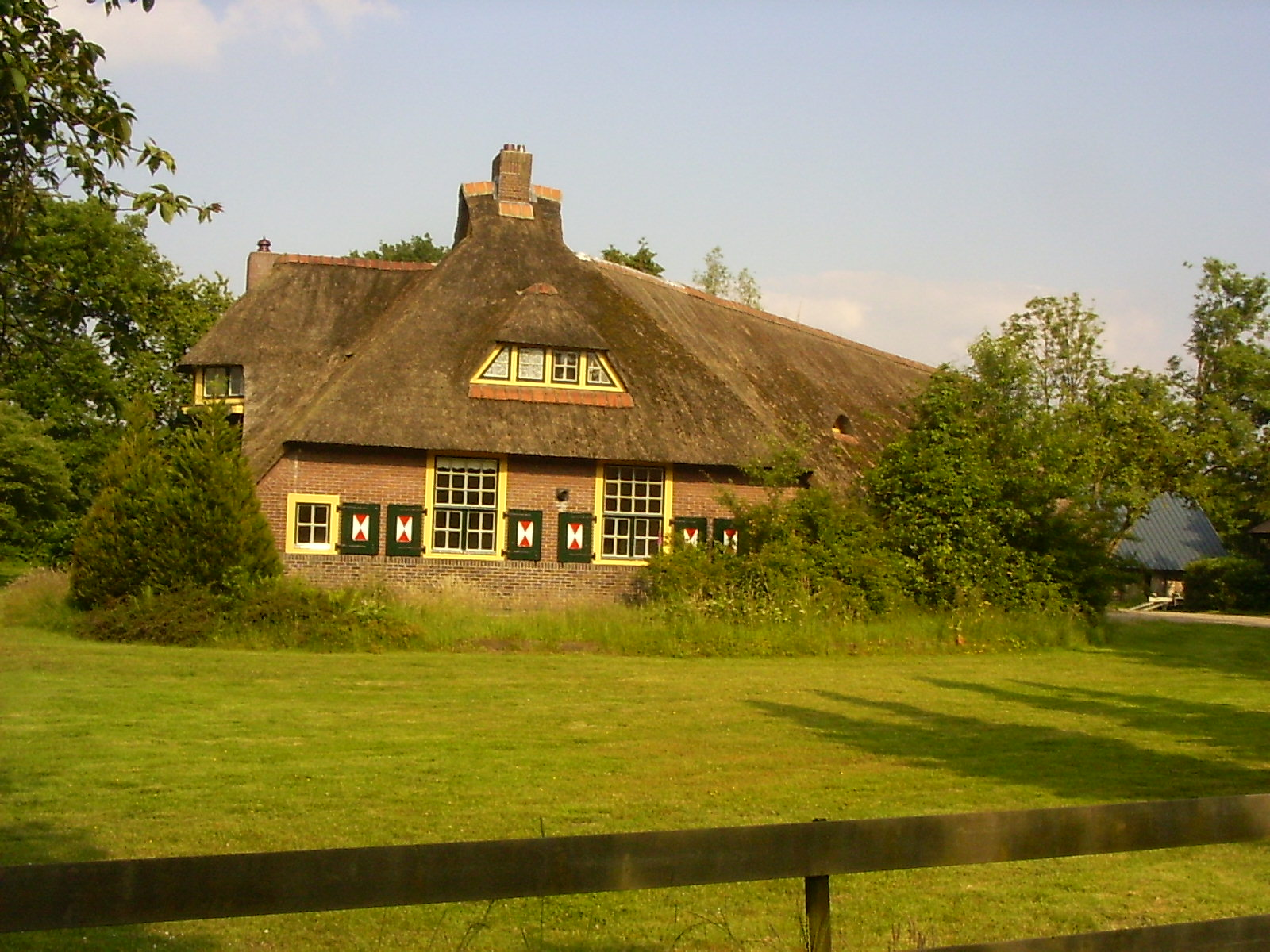
Farm in Terschuur

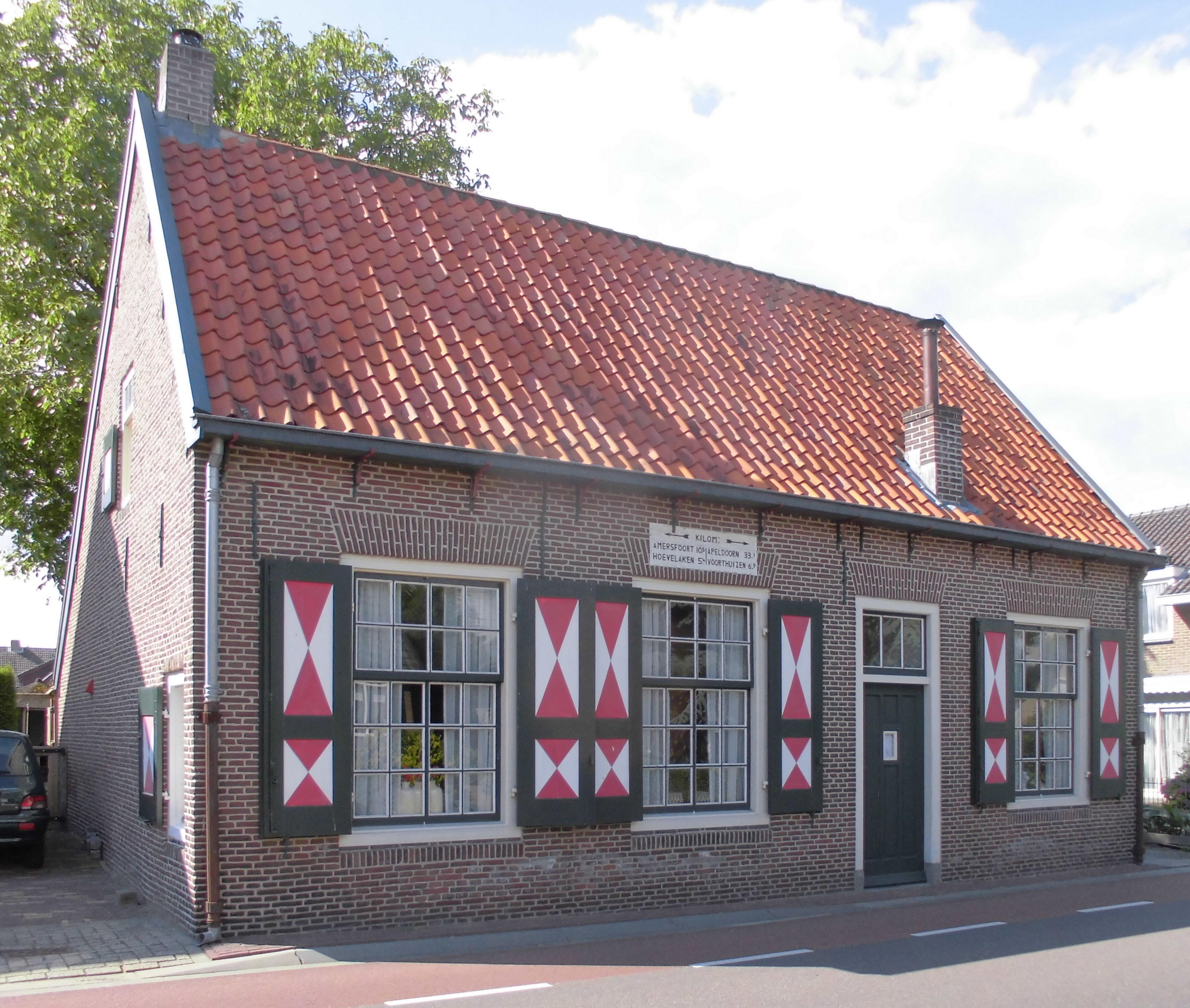
The former toll house
