= Garderen =

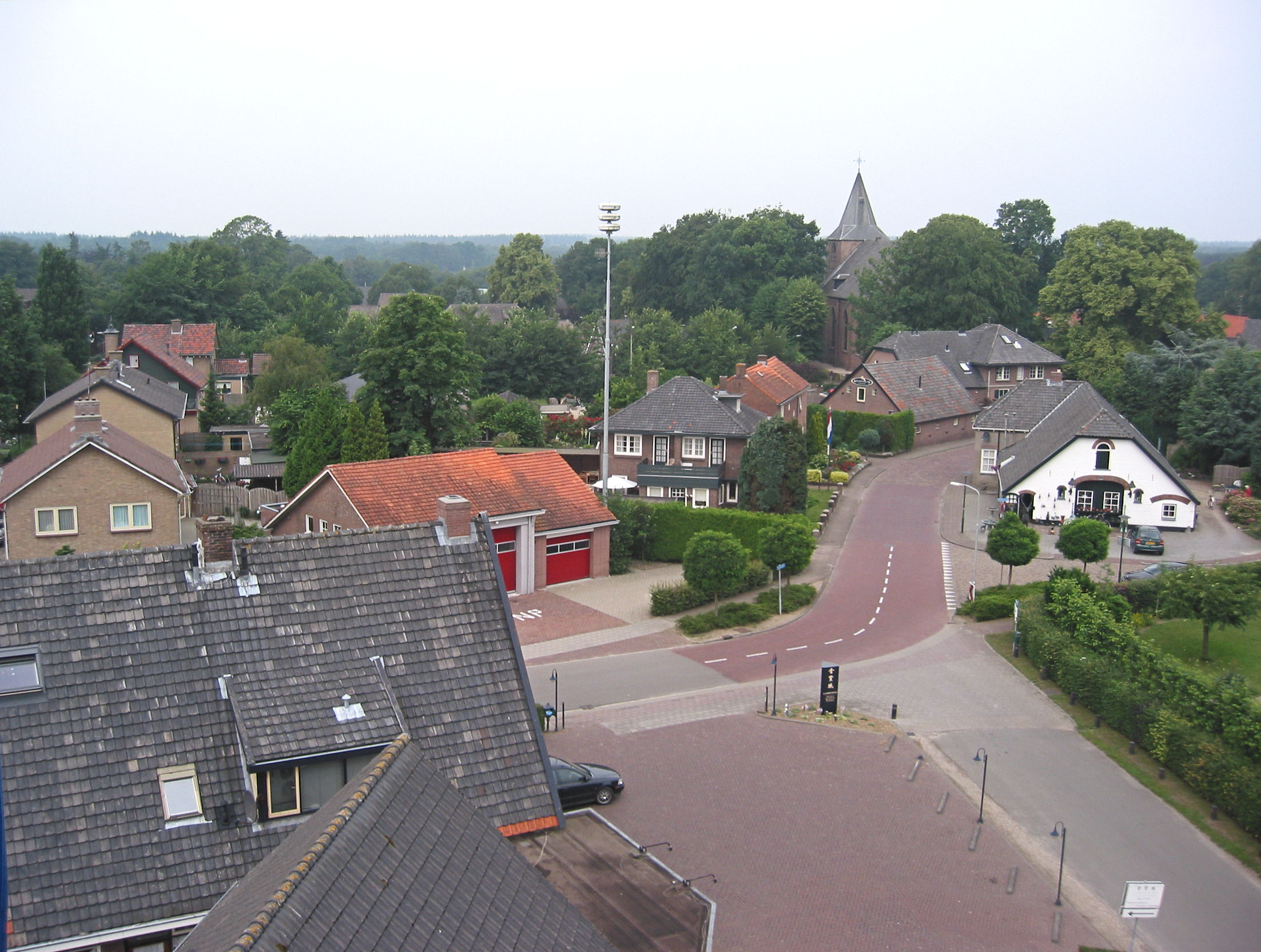
- Garderen seen from De Hoop windmill

- Location in the province of Gelderland in the Netherlands Garderen (Netherlands)
- Coordinates: 52°14′N 5°43′E
- Country: Netherlands
- Province: Gelderland
- Municipality: Barneveld

Area
  - Total: 13.79 km^{2} (5.32 sq mi)
- Elevation: 48 m (157 ft)

Population (2021)
  - Total: 2,150
  - Density: 156/km^{2} (404/sq mi)
- Time zone: UTC+1 (CET)
  - Summer (DST): UTC+2 (CEST)
- Postal code: 3886
- Dialing code: 0577

Garderen is a village in the Dutch province of Gelderland. It is located in the municipality of Barneveld, in the forests of the Veluwe. The village has 1,994 inhabitants (as of 1 January 2008).

Garderen was a separate municipality until 1818, when it was merged with Barneveld.

Amongst other things, Garderen is known for its grand forest-like nature.

== Location ==
The village is located in an agricultural enclave on the west side of the Veluwe. It has been a tourist destination for a long time, owing to its bed & breakfasts with high-quality food, but it has always remained a conservative and religious village.

== Services ==
Facilities in the village include a primary school, a medical practice, a cemetery, De Hoop windmill, various hotels, restaurants, cafes and snack bars, camping grounds, and basic shops. Several dozen other companies are located in the village. The village contains several churches: a HHK (Restored Reformed Church) congregation, a reformed congregation within the PKN (Protestant Churches of the Netherlands), and a Continuing Reformed Church (Gereformeerde Kerk). Garderen center is an administrative center for the villages of Speuld, Stroe and Kootwijk. Residents of the surrounding neighborhoods of Houtdorp, Meerveld, Nieuw-Milligen and Koudhoorn have cultural and economic links to Garderen.

== History ==
Garderen is older than the village of Barneveld and was originally the capital of the later city of Barneveld. The church of the Dutch Reformed Church was originally built in the eleventh century. The current tower dates from the fourteenth century. From 1812 to 1818 Garderen was an independent municipality with a separate administrative designation. After this it became part of the municipality of Barneveld.

== Serbian monument ==
At the cemetery, there is a Serbian war memorial, in memory of 29 Serb soldiers who were killed by Spanish flu shortly after the First World War. They were part of a large group of Serbian soldiers who were temporarily housed in the 'Lombok' barracks at the nearby Camp Milligen. Their remains were exhumed in 1938 and reinterred in a mausoleum in Jindřichovice. Renovation of the monument began In 2007, and an extension was gradually undertaken.

== Gallery ==
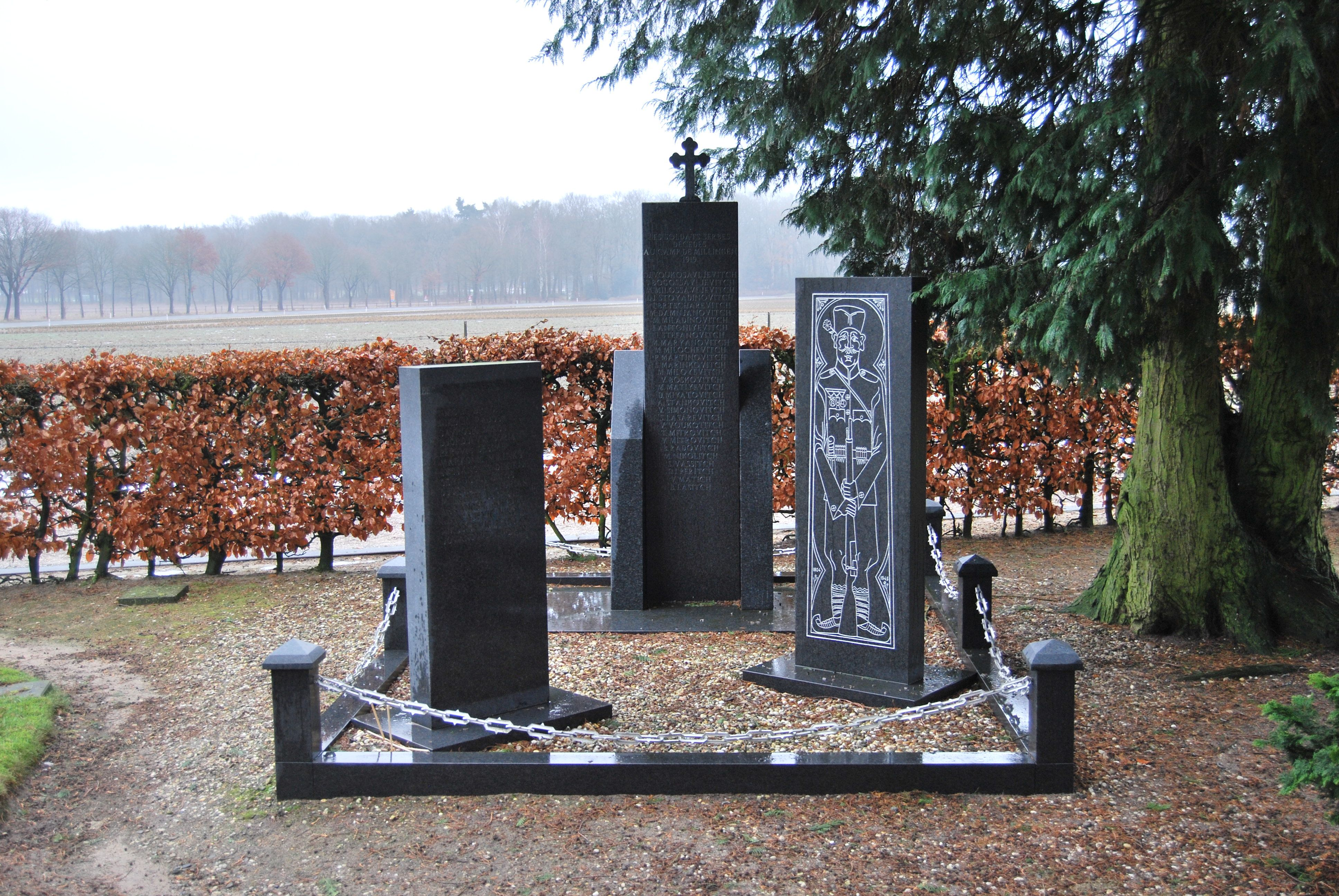
Serbian monument in Garderen

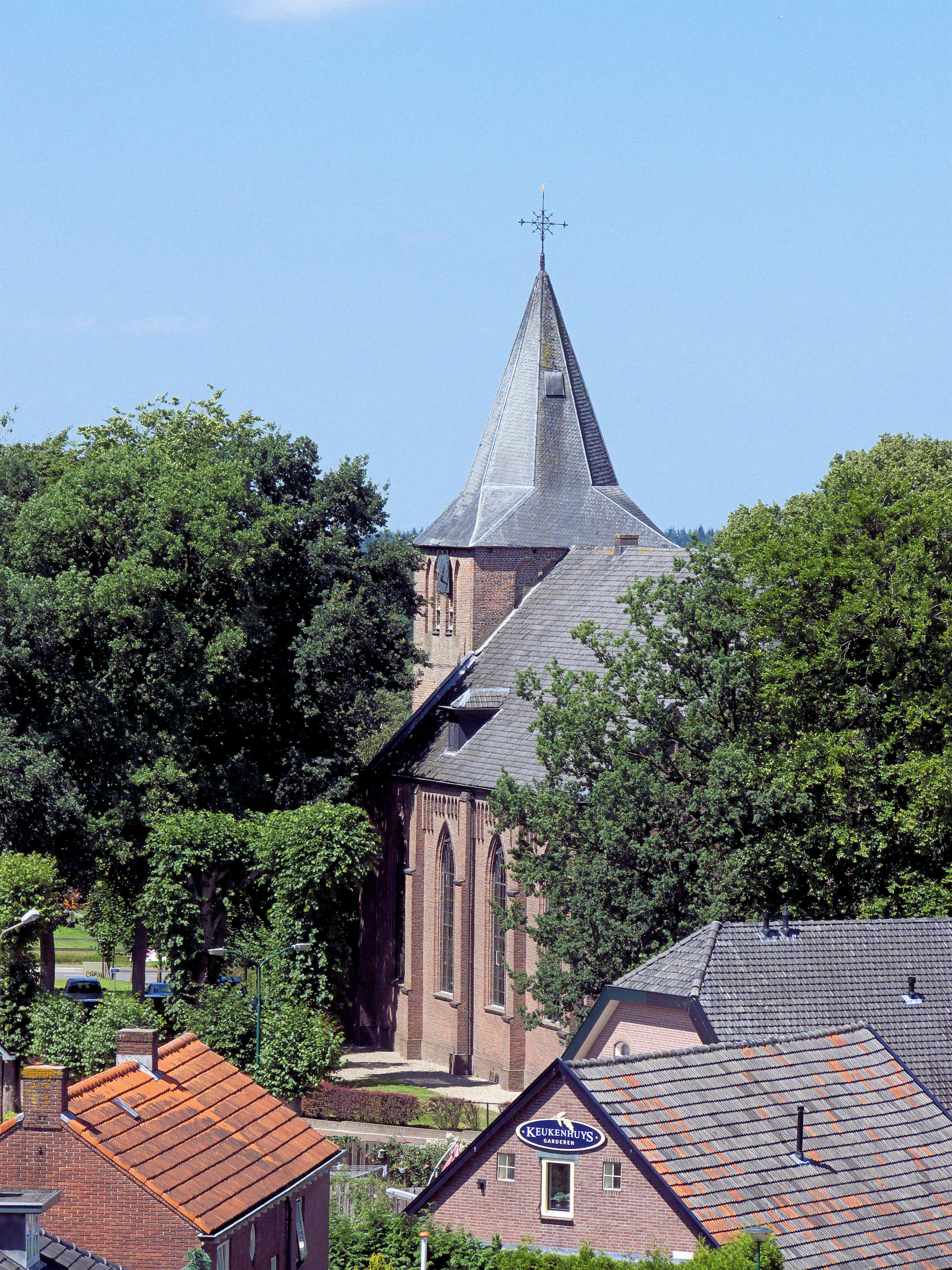
The church seen from the De Hoop (Hope) mill

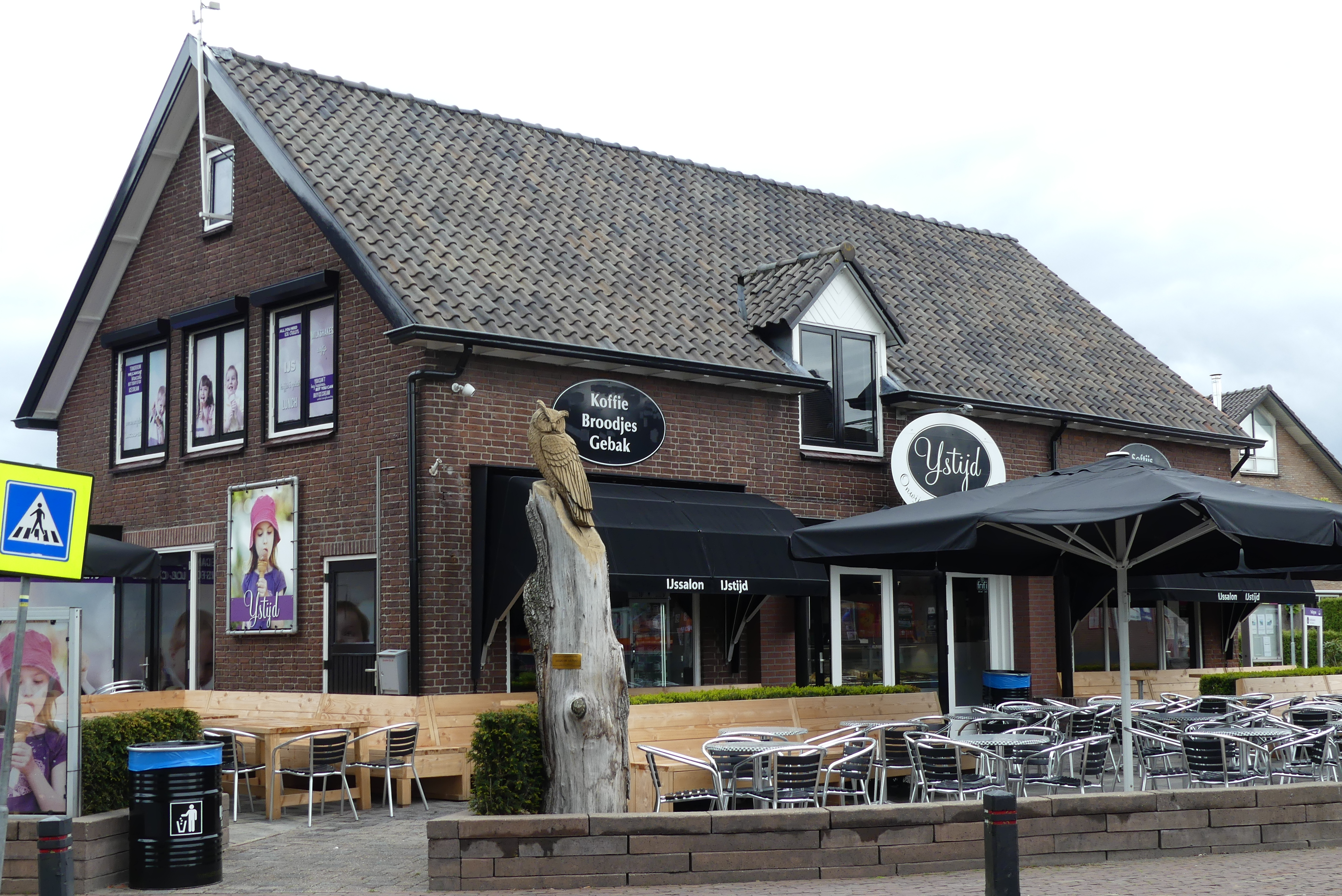
Ice cream parlour

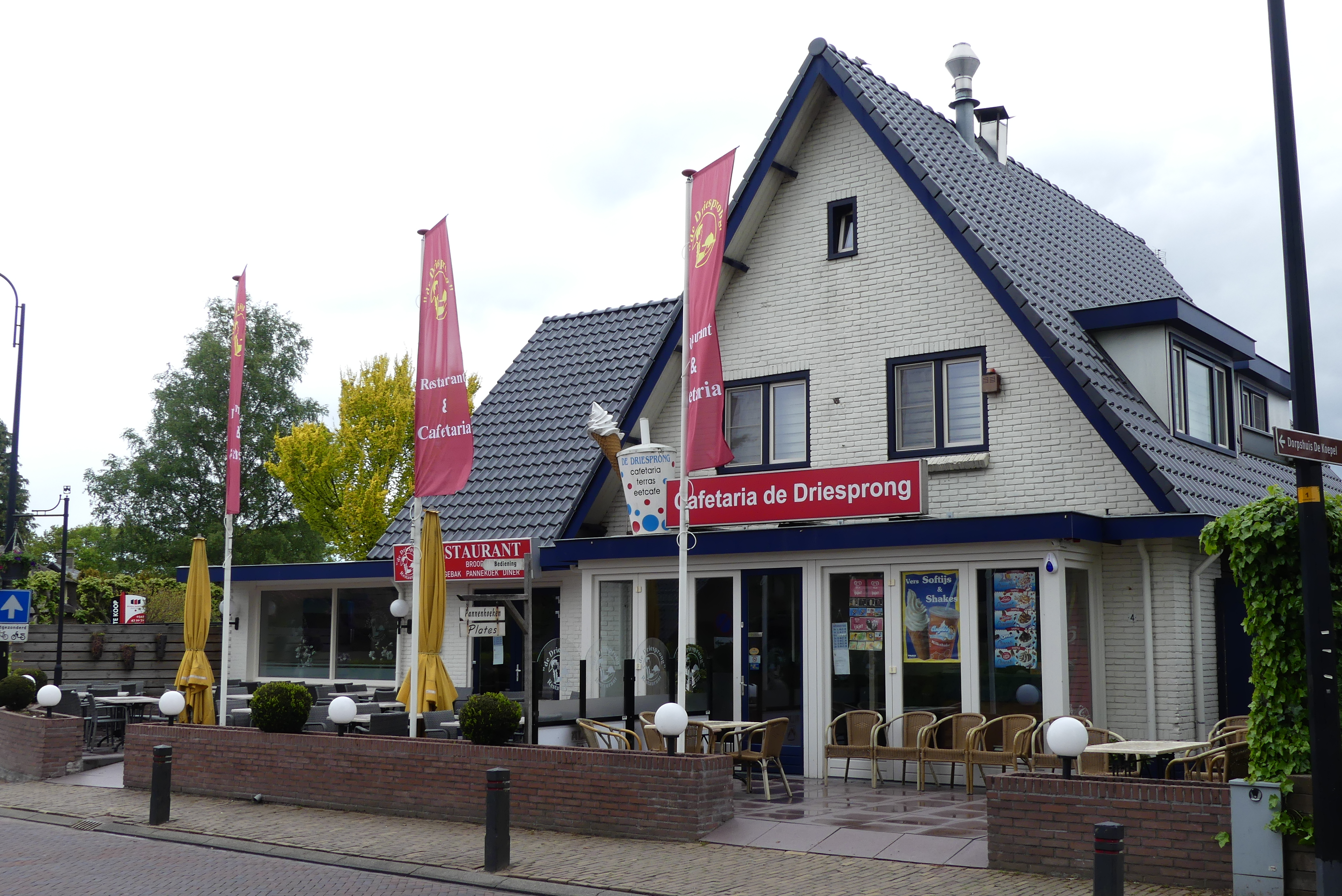
Snackbar
