= Johan Jansen =

Dutch footballer

Personal information
- Date of birth: 7 February 1989 (age 37)
- Place of birth: Terschuur, Netherlands
- Height: 1.89 m (6 ft 2 1/2 in)
- Position: Goalkeeper

Team information
- Current team: Sparta Nijkerk
- Number: 1

Senior career*
Years	Team	Apps	(Gls)
2007–2010	NAC Breda	1	(0)
2010–2011	Almere City	6	(0)
2011–2022	GVVV	269	(0)
2022–	Sparta Nijkerk	11	(0)
- * Club domestic league appearances and goals as of 21 January 2023

Johan Jansen (born 7 February 1989) is a Dutch professional footballer who plays, as a goalkeeper, for Sparta Nijkerk in the Dutch Derde Divisie.

== Career ==
Born in Terschuur, Jansen made his professional debut during the 2007–08 season for NAC Breda. After playing with Almere City, Jansen moved to GVVV in February 2011.

On 10 December 2021, Sparta Nijkerk announced their signing of Jansen, who would begin playing for them in the 2022–23 season. This was confirmed by his former club, GVVV, a day later.
