= Gorinchem Noord railway station =

Planned railway station in the Netherlands

Gorinchem Noord

General information
- Location: Netherlands
- Coordinates: 51°51′00″N 4°58′49″E
Location
- Location within Netherlands

Gorinchem Noord is a planned railway station, in Gorinchem, Netherlands.

== History ==
The station would lie on the Merwede-Lingelijn (Dordrecht - Geldermalsen) and would be located between Gorinchem and Arkel. The station is primarily for northern Gorinchem, where there is an industrial estate and the Da Vinci College, and small settlements in the area. In 2020, plans to construct the new station were put on hold, and in 2023, the city council of Gorinchem expressed interest in scrapping the plan entirely.

== Other planned stations ==
Other proposals on the Merwede-Lingelijn line included:

- Leerdam Broekgraaf
