= Sliedrecht railway station =

Railway station in the Netherlands

Sliedrecht
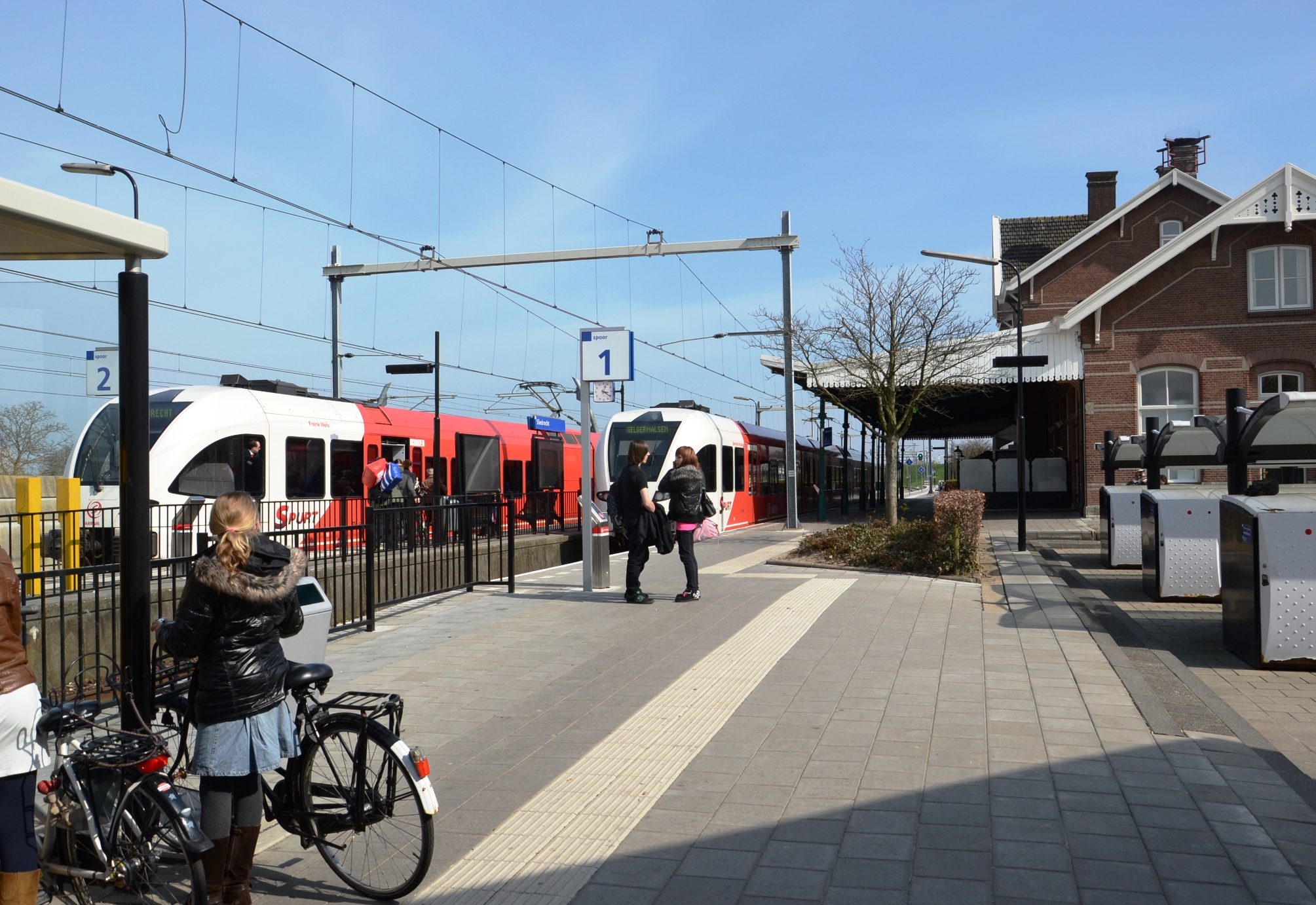
- Two trains arriving at the station.

General information
- Location: Stationsplein, Sliedrecht; Netherlands
- Coordinates: 51°49′46″N 4°46′41″E
- Operator: Qbuzz
- Line: MerwedeLingelijn
- Platforms: 2

Construction
- Cycle facilities: Bicycle parking racks and free on train

History
- Opened: 16 July 1885

Services
Preceding station	Arriva Netherlands	Following station
Sliedrecht Baanhoek towards Dordrecht	Stoptrein 36700	Hardinxveld Blauwe Zoom towards Geldermalsen
Sliedrecht Baanhoek towards Dordrecht	Stoptrein 36800	Hardinxveld Blauwe Zoom towards Gorinchem
Location
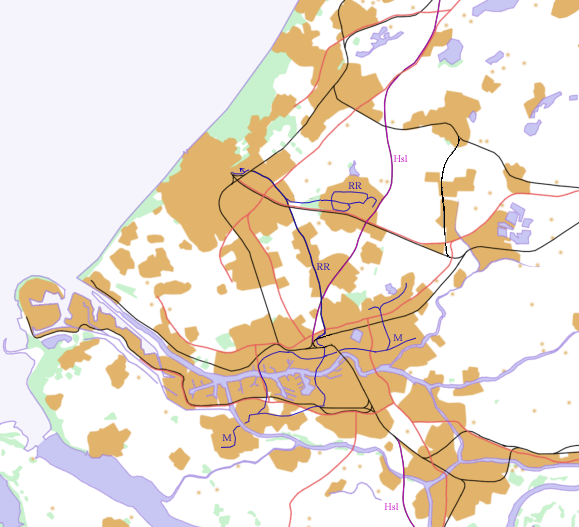
- Location within Southwest Randstad Location within Netherlands

Sliedrecht is a railway station in Sliedrecht, Netherlands. The station is located on the MerwedeLingelijn line between Dordrecht and Geldermalsen, part of the Betuwelijn.

== Train services ==
Route	Service type	Operator	Notes
Dordrecht - Gorinchem - Geldermalsen	Local ("Stoptrein")	Qbuzz	2x per hour
Dordrecht - Gorinchem	Local ("Stoptrein")	Qbuzz	2x per hour, Mon-Sat only. Not after 21:00.

Bicycles are allowed on board for free.

== Bus services ==
Line	Route	Operator	Notes
75	Sliedrecht - Bleskensgraaf - Molenaarsgraaf - Ottoland - Goudriaan - Noordeloos - Meerkerk	Juijn	Mon-Fri during daytime hours only.
388	Rotterdam Kralingse Zoom - Papendrecht - Sliedrecht - Noordeloos - Meerkerk - Vianen - Utrecht Papendorp - Utrecht Centraal	Qbuzz	
701	Gorinchem - Hoornaar - Noordeloos - Goudriaan - Ottoland - Brandwijk - Bleskensgraaf - Sliedrecht	Qbuzz	Mon-Fri during daytime hours only.
915	Wijngaarden - Sliedrecht	Qbuzz	This bus only operates if called one hour before its supposed departure ("belbus").

== History ==
It was opened on 16 July 1885, when the station had a single track. Next to the passenger lines is the Betuweroute freight railway line. Arriva operated the service since December 2006. However, Qbuzz took over services from Arriva on 9 December 2018. A new station building was built in 1985, which has already been demolished. In the older stationbuilding (photo) is a restaurant: "De Heren van Slydrecht" (The Lords of Sliedrecht).

On 27 November 1942, it was the scene of a collision between two trains around 18:30 local time. A slow train to Dordrecht was waiting at one of the platforms, and a second train from Leerdam collided at high speed with the rear carriages. The steam engine continued until it derailed further up the line and one of the trains involved caught fire.
