= Hemmen-Dodewaard railway station =

Railway station in the Netherlands

Hemmen-Dodewaard
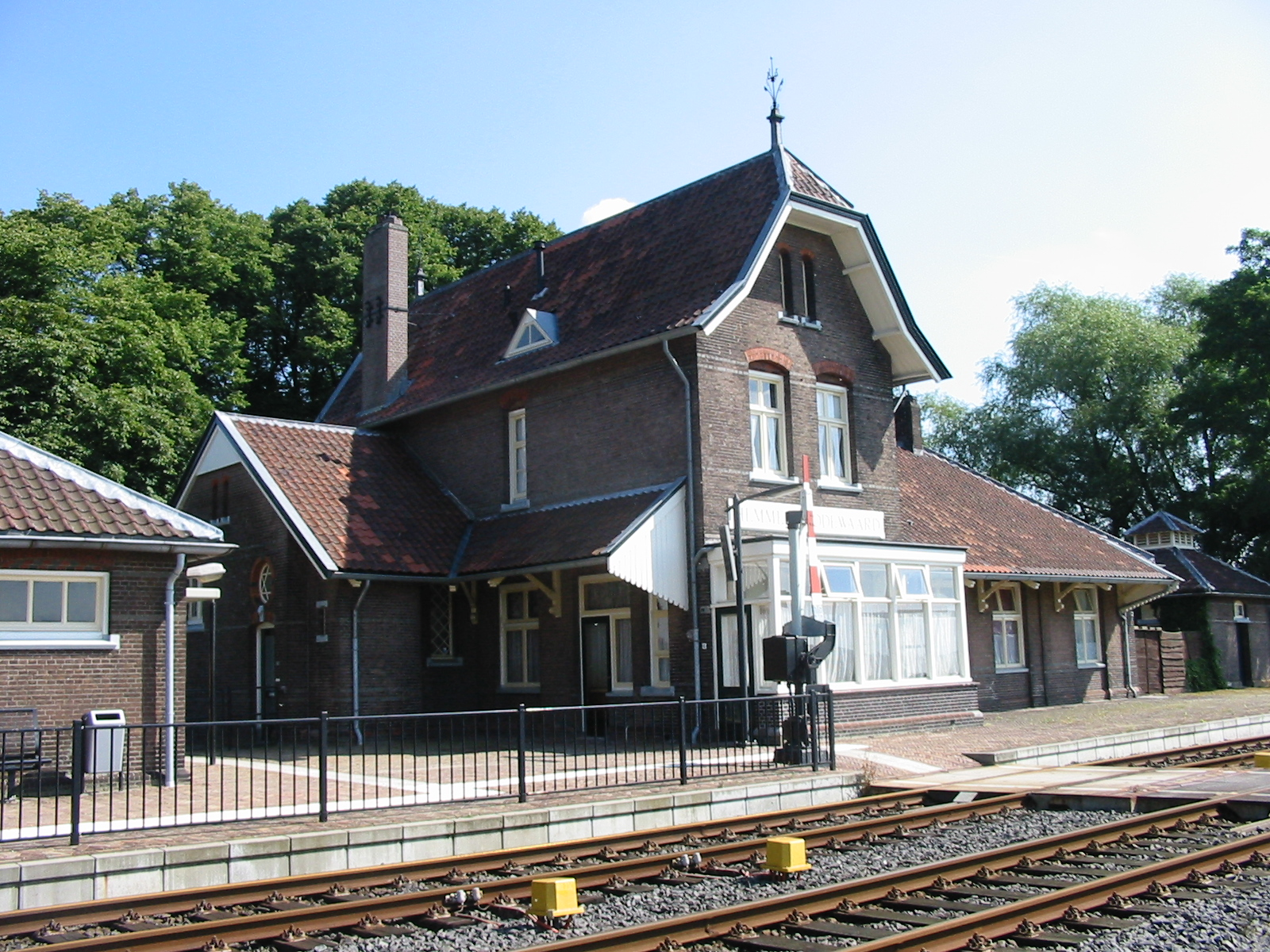

General information
- Location: Netherlands
- Coordinates: 51°55′20″N 5°40′24″E
- Line: Elst–Dordrecht railway

Other information
- Station code: Hmn

History
- Opened: 1882

Services
Preceding station	Arriva Netherlands	Following station
Opheusden towards Tiel	Stoptrein 31100	Zetten-Andelst towards Arnhem Centraal
Location
- Location within Netherlands

Hemmen-Dodewaard is a railway station in the municipality Neder-Betuwe, Netherlands, located between the villages Hemmen and Dodewaard. The station opened on 1 November 1882 and is on the Elst–Dordrecht railway. Train services are operated by Arriva.

== Train services ==
Route	Service type	Operator	Notes
Elst - Arnhem Centraal	Local ("Stoptrein")	Arriva	2x per hour: 1x per hour to Elst and 1x per hour to Arnhem - Evenings and weekends 1x per hour to Arnhem. Does not stop at Arnhem Zuid.

== Bus services ==
There is no bus service to the station.
