= Zetten-Andelst railway station =

Railway station in the Netherlands

Zetten-Andelst
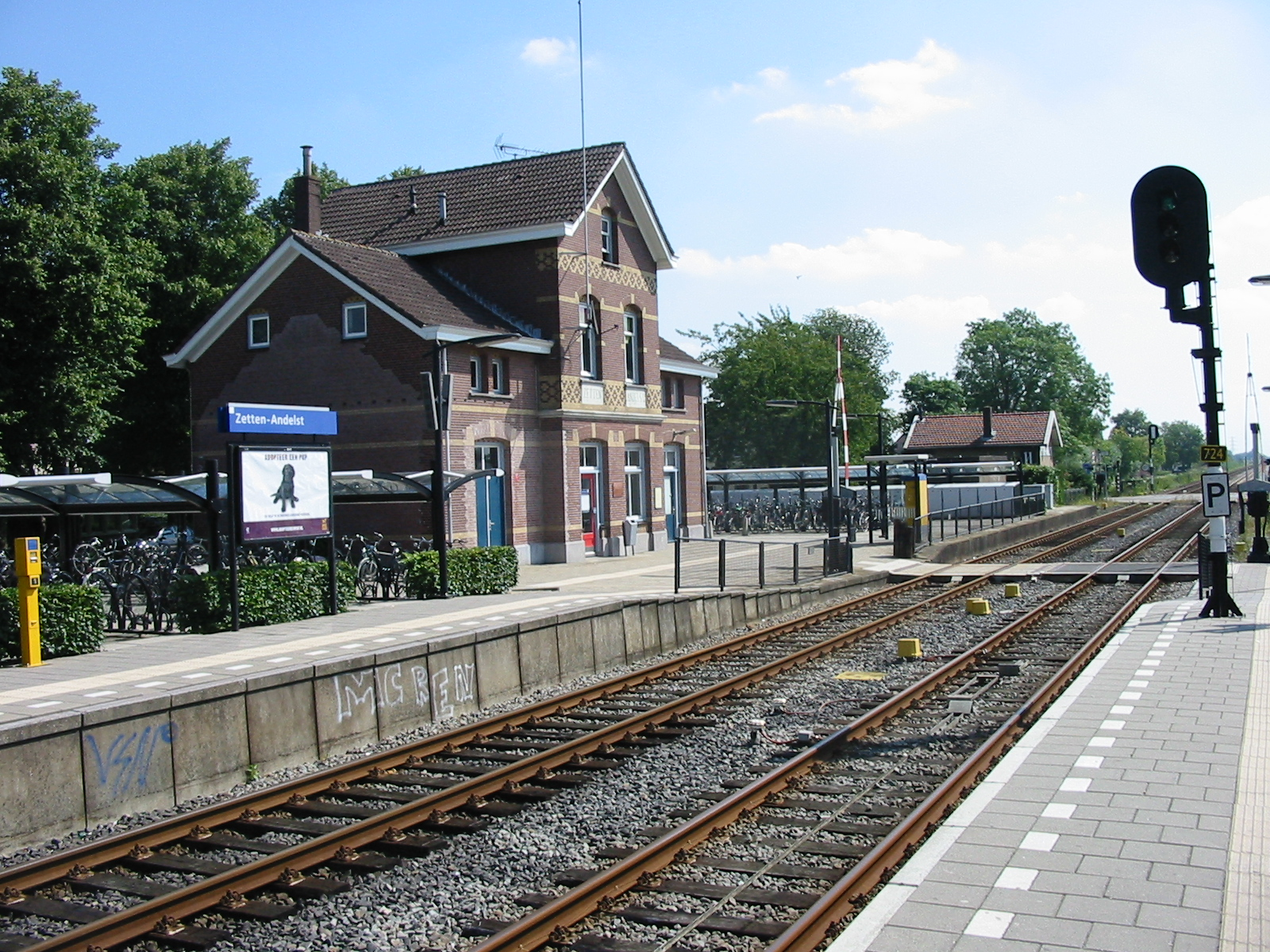
- Zetten-Andelst railway station in 2007

General information
- Location: Netherlands
- Coordinates: 51°55′10″N 5°43′23″E
- Line: Elst–Dordrecht railway

History
- Opened: 1882

Services
Preceding station	Arriva Netherlands	Following station
Hemmen-Dodewaard towards Tiel	Stoptrein 31100	Elst towards Arnhem Centraal
Location
- Location within Netherlands

Zetten-Andelst is a railway station for Zetten and Andelst, Netherlands. The station opened on 1 November 1882 and is on the Elst–Dordrecht railway. Train services are operated by Arriva. The station is situated between the two villages.

== Train services ==
Route	Service type	Operator	Notes
Elst - Arnhem Centraal	Local ("Stoptrein")	Arriva	2x per hour: 1x per hour to Elst and 1x per hour to Arnhem - Evenings and weekends 1x per hour to Arnhem. Does not stop at Arnhem Zuid.

== Bus services ==
Line	Route	Operator	Notes
35	Bemmel - Elst - Valburg - Herveld - Andelst - Zetten	Breng and TCR	Mon-Fri during daytime hours only.
237	Heteren - Randwijk - Indoornik - Zetten - Andelst - Wely - Hien - Dodewaard - Opheusden - Kesteren	Arriva	During evenings and weekends, this bus only operates if called one hour before its supposed departure ("belbus").
853	Arnhem Willemsplein → Arnhem Kronenburg → Arnhem Station Zuid → Driel → Heteren → Randwijk → Zetten	Breng	This bus only operates on Saturday late nights (between midnight and 5:00). Boarding is only possible from Arnhem Willemsplein.

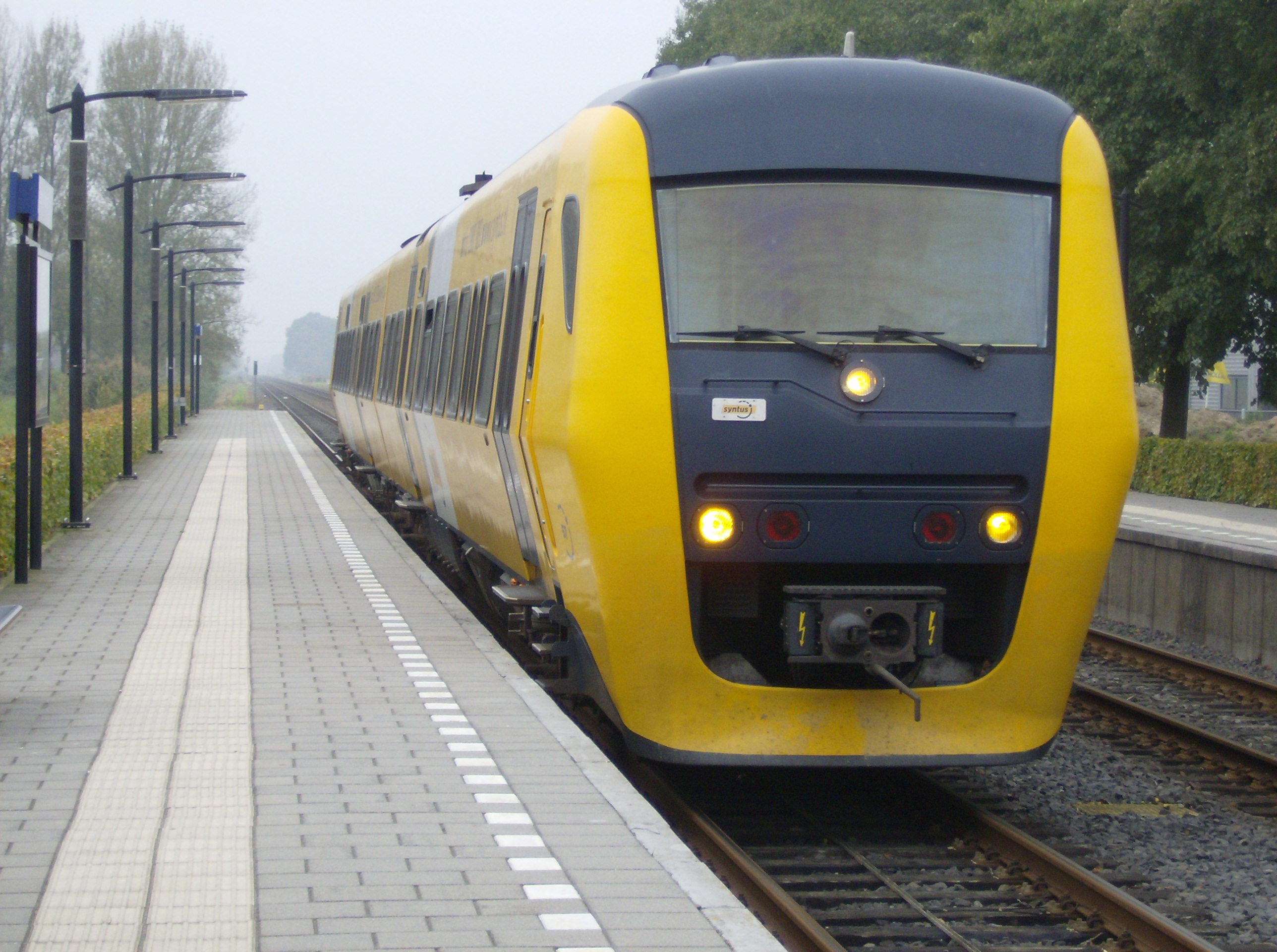
A Buffel at Zetten-Andelst
