= Leerdam Broekgraaf railway station =

Proposed railway station in Leerdam, Netherlands

Leerdam Broekgraaf

General information
- Location: Netherlands
Location
- Location within Netherlands

Leerdam Broekgraaf was a planned railway station, in Leerdam, Netherlands.

== History ==
The station was set to open in 2011. The station would have been on the Merwede-Lingelijn (Dordrecht - Geldermalsen) and between Arkel and Leerdam to be used by passengers from western Leerdam and small settlements in the area. In 2016 the municipality of Leerdam announced that the station would not be built due to lack of funding.
