= Opheusden railway station =

Railway station in the Netherlands

Opheusden
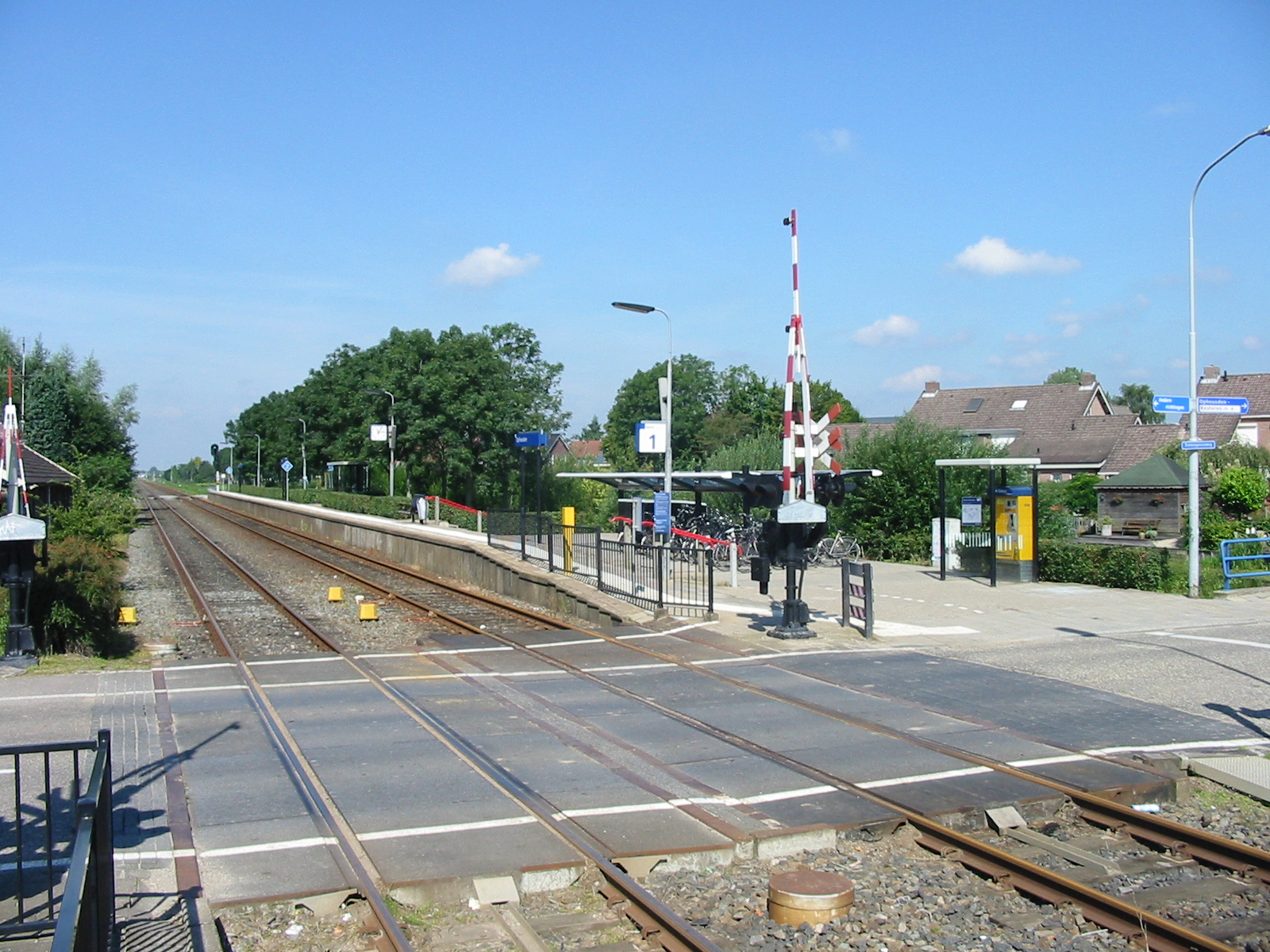
- Opheusden railway station in 2007

General information
- Location: Netherlands
- Coordinates: 51°55′34″N 5°38′13″E
- Line: Elst–Dordrecht railway

History
- Opened: 1882

Services
Preceding station	Arriva Netherlands	Following station
Kesteren towards Tiel	Stoptrein 31100	Hemmen-Dodewaard towards Arnhem Centraal
Location
- Location within Netherlands

Opheusden is a railway station located in Opheusden, Netherlands. The station opened on 1 November 1882 and is on the Elst–Dordrecht railway. Train services are operated by Arriva. The station temporarily closed between 1890 and 1898. Between 1882 and 1890, this station was called Dalwagen(straat).

== Train services ==
Route	Service type	Operator	Notes
Elst - Arnhem Centraal	Local ("Stoptrein")	Arriva	2x per hour: 1x per hour to Elst and 1x per hour to Arnhem - Evenings and weekends 1x per hour to Arnhem. Does not stop at Arnhem Zuid.

== Bus services ==
Line	Route	Operator	Notes
237	Heteren - Randwijk - Indoornik - Zetten - Andelst - Wely - Hien - Dodewaard - Opheusden - Kesteren	Arriva	During evenings and weekends, this bus only operates if called one hour before its supposed departure ("belbus").
