= Kesteren railway station =

Railway station in Kesteren, Netherlands

Kesteren
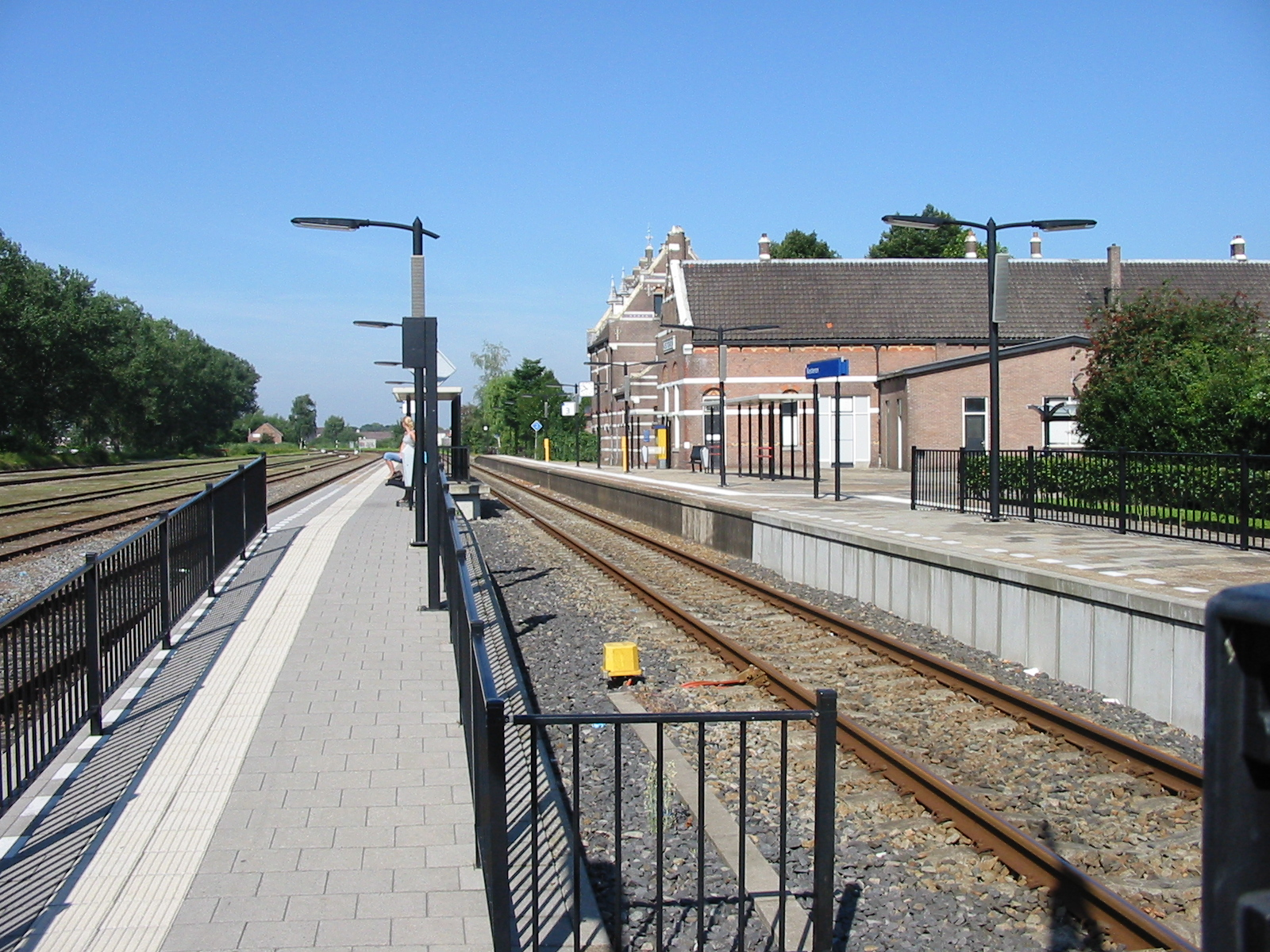

General information
- Location: Netherlands
- Coordinates: 51°55′53″N 5°35′1″E
- Line: Elst–Dordrecht railway

Other information
- Station code: Ktr

History
- Opened: 1882

Services
Preceding station	Arriva Netherlands	Following station
Tiel Terminus	Stoptrein 31100	Opheusden towards Arnhem Centraal
Location
- Location within Netherlands

Kesteren is a railway station located in Kesteren, Netherlands. The station opened on 1 November 1882 and is on the Elst–Dordrecht railway. Train services are operated by Arriva. Between 1945 and 1981, this station was called Kesteren- Rhenen.

The station was the terminus of the line from Amersfoort, which allowed a faster journey time to Nijmegen from Amsterdam. The line still exists between Amersfoort and Leusden, Near Overberg to Rhenen and Kesteren station itself. The section between Amersfoort and Leusden, the Ponlijn, is still in use as well as the section between Veenendaal and Rhenen, the Veenendaallijn.

== Train services ==
Route	Service type	Operator	Notes
Tiel - Arnhem Centraal	Local ("Stoptrein")	Arriva	2x per hour: 1x per hour to Tiel and 1x per hour to Arnhem - Evenings and weekends 1x per hour to Arnhem. Does not stop at Arnhem Zuid.

== Bus services ==
Line	Route	Operator	Notes
44	Tiel - Maurikseveld - Maurik - Eck en Wiel - Ingen - Ommeren - Lienden - Kesteren - Rhenen - Wageningen	Juijn, Arriva and Krol Reizen	On weekdays, this bus does not operate after 21:00 (only on weekends).
45	Tiel - Echteld - IJzendoorn - Ochten - Kesteren - Rhenen - Wageningen	Juijn and Arriva	On weekends, this bus only operates between Tiel and Kesteren.
46	(Tiel Passewaaij -) Tiel Station - Kerk-Avezaath - Erichem - Buren - Asch - Zoelmond - Beusichem - Culemborg	Arriva and Juijn	During weekday daytime hours, this bus runs through to Tiel Passewaaij. Arriva operates this bus during weekday daytime hours, Juijn during evenings and weekends.
145	Kesteren - Rhenen	Juijn	Mon-Fri during daytime hours only.
237	Heteren - Randwijk - Indoornik - Zetten - Andelst - Wely - Hien - Dodewaard - Opheusden - Kesteren	Arriva	During evenings and weekends, this bus only operates if called one hour before its supposed departure ("belbus").
844	Tiel - Maurik - Eck en Wiel - Ingen - Ommeren - Lienden - Kesteren	Arriva	This bus only operates on weekdays after 21:00. From Tiel Station and within Tiel's town centre, this bus can be boarded at any time, but from other stops along the route, it only operates if called one hour before its supposed departure ("belbus").
