= Beesd railway station =

Railway station in the Netherlands

Beesd
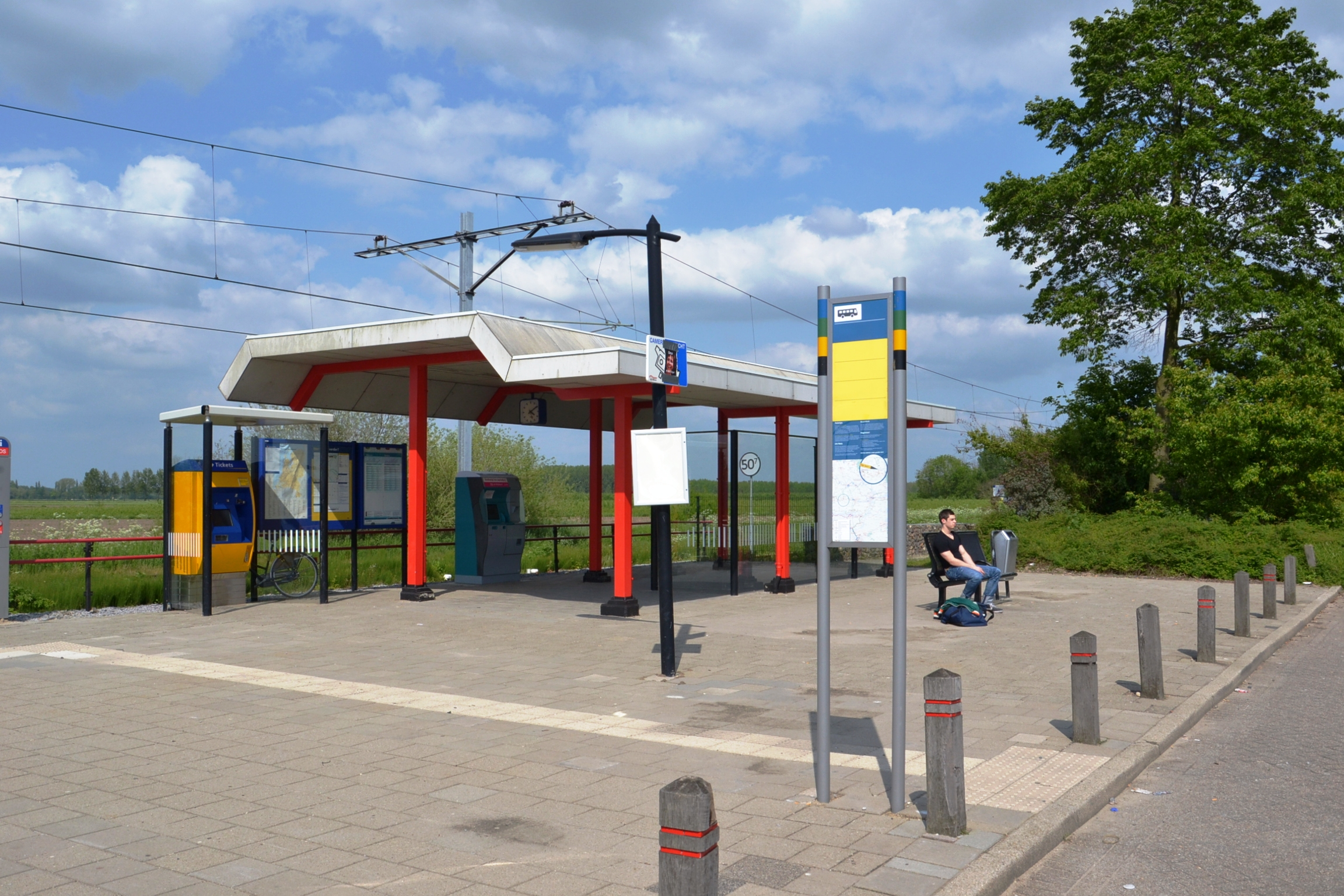
- The simple station building.

General information
- Location: Netherlands
- Coordinates: 51°53′57″N 5°11′42″E
- Operator: Qbuzz
- Line: MerwedeLingelijn
- Platforms: 1
- Tracks: 2

History
- Opened: 1883

Services
Preceding station	Qbuzz	Following station
Leerdam towards Dordrecht	Line 36700	Geldermalsen Terminus
Location
- Location within Netherlands

Beesd is a railway station in Beesd. Netherlands. The station opened on 1 December 1883. It lies about 2 km north of Beesd itself. The station is located on the railway line between Dordrecht and Geldermalsen (MerwedeLingelijn). The station has a small island platform, and two tracks, but only one of the tracks is actively used. Train services were operated by Arriva until 8 December 2018, when Qbuzz took over services.

== Train services ==
Route	Service type	Operator	Notes
Dordrecht - Gorinchem - Geldermalsen	Local ("Stoptrein")	Qbuzz	2x per hour

== Bus services ==
Line	Route	Operator	Notes
260	Geldermalsen - Deil - Enspijk - Beesd - Rumpt - Rhenoy - Acquoy - Asperen - Leerdam	Arriva	On evenings and Sundays, this bus only operates if called one hour before its supposed departure ("belbus").
