= Hardinxveld Blauwe Zoom railway station =

Railway station in the Netherlands

Hardinxveld Blauwe Zoom
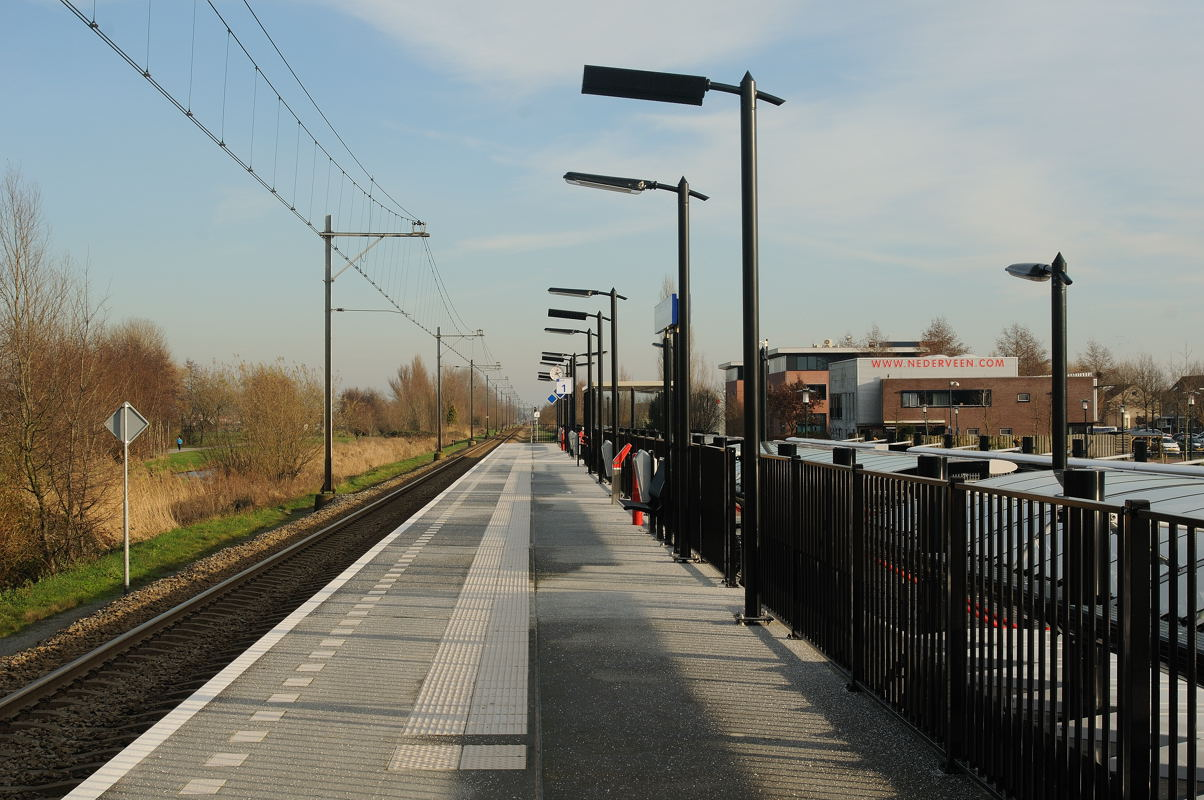
- Platform 1 and the single track.

General information
- Location: Schapedrift, Giessendam; Netherlands
- Coordinates: 51°49′46″N 4°48′44″E
- Operator: Qbuzz
- Line: MerwedeLingelijn
- Platforms: 1

Construction
- Cycle facilities: Bicycle parking racks and free on train

History
- Opened: 2011-12-11

Services
Preceding station	Arriva Netherlands	Following station
Sliedrecht towards Dordrecht	Stoptrein 36700	Hardinxveld-Giessendam towards Geldermalsen
Sliedrecht towards Dordrecht	Stoptrein 36800	Hardinxveld-Giessendam towards Gorinchem
Location
- Location within Netherlands

Hardinxveld Blauwe Zoom is a railway station in Hardinxveld-Giessendam, Netherlands. Train services are operated by Qbuzz.

== History ==
The station opened on 11 December 2011. The station lies on the MerwedeLingelijn (Dordrecht - Geldermalsen) and is located between Sliedrecht and Hardinxveld-Giessendam. The station is primarily for western Giessendam, where a new housing development is being built and small settlements in the area.

== Train services ==
Route	Service type	Operator	Notes
Dordrecht - Gorinchem - Geldermalsen	Local ("Stoptrein")	Qbuzz	2x per hour

== Bus services ==
There is no direct bus service at this station.
