= Boven Hardinxveld railway station =

Railway station in Netherlands

Boven-Hardinxveld
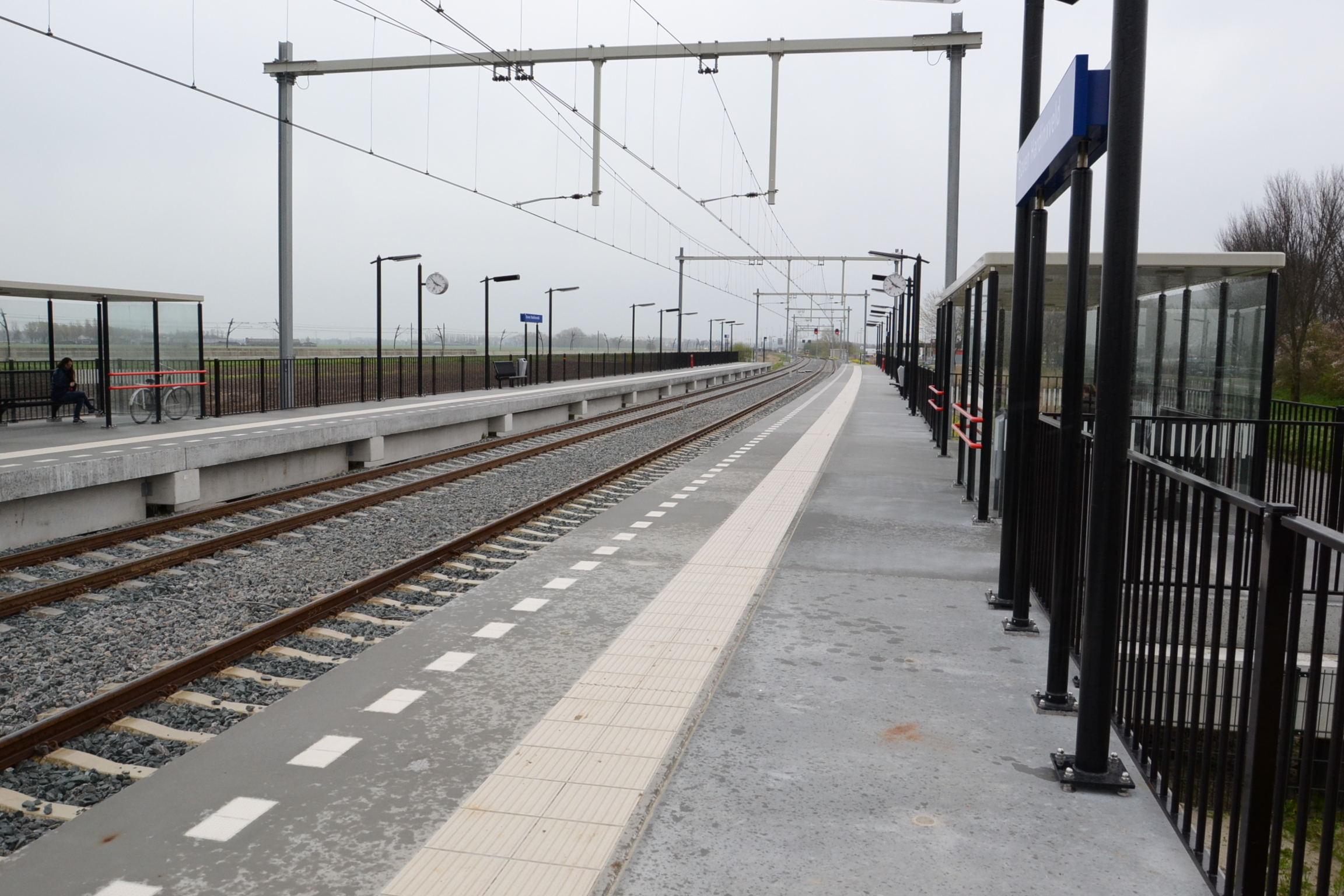
- The two platforms and the double track.

General information
- Location: Parallelweg, Boven-Hardinxveld; Netherlands
- Coordinates: 51°49′55″N 4°52′29″E
- Operator: Qbuzz
- Line: MerwedeLingelijn
- Platforms: 2

Construction
- Cycle facilities: Bicycle parking racks and free on train

History
- Opened: 16 Jul 1885, 16 April 2012
- Closed: 15 May 1934

Services
Preceding station	Qbuzz	Following station
Hardinxveld-Giessendam towards Dordrecht	Line 7200	Gorinchem towards Geldermalsen
Hardinxveld-Giessendam towards Dordrecht	Line 36800	Gorinchem Terminus
Location
- Location within Netherlands

Boven-Hardinxveld is a railway station, in Boven-Hardinxveld, Netherlands.

== History ==
The station opened on 16 Jul 1885 as Buldersteeg. It was renamed Boven-Hardinxveld on 15 May 1927. The station was closed on 15 May 1934, but reopened on 16 April 2012. The station lies on the MerwedeLingelijn (Dordrecht - Geldermalsen). The station is primarily for Hardinxveld and small settlements in the area. Trains can pass each other here, the station has a double track . Train services are operated by Qbuzz.

== Train services ==
Route	Service type	Operator	Notes
Dordrecht - Gorinchem - Geldermalsen	Local ("Stoptrein")	Qbuzz	2x per hour
Dordrecht - Gorinchem	Local ("Stoptrein")	Qbuzz	Mon-Sat only. Not after 20:30.

== Bus services ==
Line	Route	Operator	Notes
707	Giessenburg - Giessen-Oudekerk - Hardinxveld-Giessendam - Boven-Hardinxveld	Qbuzz	Mon-Fri during daytime hours only.
951	Giessenburg - Boven-Hardinxveld	Qbuzz	This bus only operates if called one hour before its supposed departure ("belbus").
