= Hardinxveld-Giessendam railway station =

Railway station

Hardinxveld-Giessendam
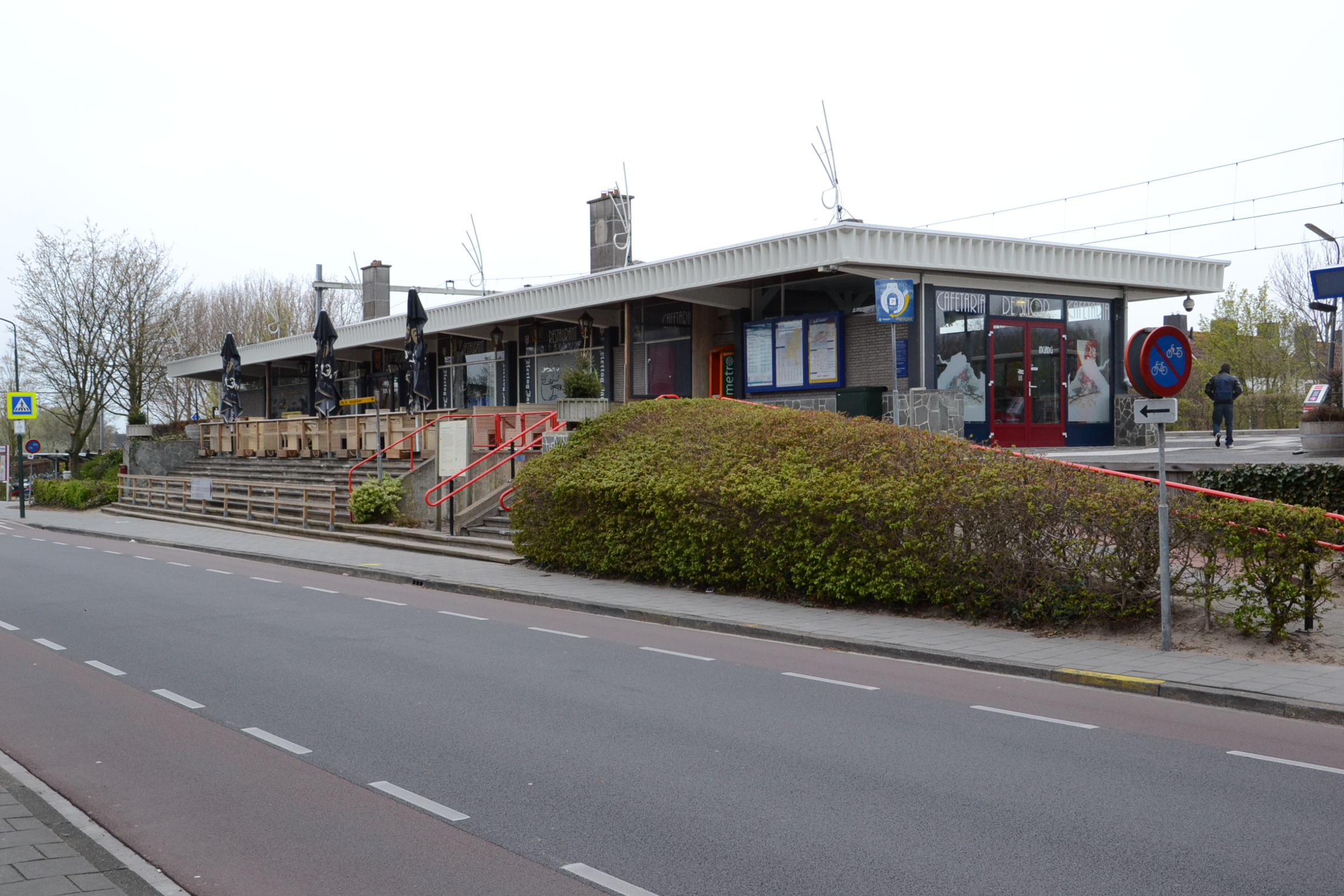
- The former station building

General information
- Location: Stationstraat, Hardinxveld-Giessendam; Netherlands
- Coordinates: 51°49′49″N 4°50′07″E
- Operator: Nederlandse Spoorwegen
- Line: MerwedeLingelijn
- Platforms: 2

Construction
- Cycle facilities: Bicycle parking racks and free on train

Other information
- Station code: Gnd

History
- Opened: 1885

Services
Preceding station	Arriva Netherlands	Following station
Hardinxveld Blauwe Zoom towards Dordrecht	Stoptrein 36700	Gorinchem towards Geldermalsen
Hardinxveld Blauwe Zoom towards Dordrecht	Stoptrein 36800	Gorinchem Terminus
Location
- Location within Netherlands

Hardinxveld-Giessendam is a railway station for Hardinxveld-Giessendam in the province of South Holland in the Netherlands. It is located on the MerwedeLingelijn, between Dordrecht and Geldermalsen. Train services are operated by Qbuzz.

== History ==
The station was opened as the Giessendam-Oudekerk railway station on 16 July 1885. To the east, outside the two villages, was the Hardinxveld-Giessendam railway station. When the latter was closed down on 15 May 1927, the Giessendam-Oudekerk station was renamed "Giessendam-Neder Hardinxveld". The station building was severely damaged during World War II, and was demolished in 1945. On 2 June 1957, the name of the station was changed to its current name, and a year later a new station building was constructed. The building is now used as a restaurant.

== Train services ==
Route	Service type	Operator	Notes
Dordrecht - Gorinchem - Geldermalsen	Local ("Stoptrein")	Qbuzz	2x per hour
Dordrecht - Gorinchem	Local ("Stoptrein")	Qbuzz	2x per hour, Mon-Sat only. Not after 21:00.

== Bus services ==
Line	Route	Operator	Notes
77	Sliedrecht - Hardinxveld-Giessendam	Juijn	Mon-Sat during daytime hours only.
191	Boven-Hardinxveld - Hardinxveld-Giessendam - Sliedrecht - Papendrecht - Ridderkerk - Rotterdam Zuidplein	Qbuzz	Rush hours only.
707	Giessenburg - Giessen-Oudekerk - Hardinxveld-Giessendam - Boven-Hardinxveld	Qbuzz	Mon-Fri during daytime hours only.
891	Rotterdam Centraal Station - Alblasserdam - Papendrecht - Sliedrecht - Hardinxveld-Giessendam	Qbuzz	Saturday late nights (between midnight and 5:00) only.
953	Giessenburg - Hardinxveld-Giessendam	Qbuzz	Only operates if called one hour before its scheduled departure time ("belbus").
