= MerwedeLingelijn =

Train service in the Netherlands

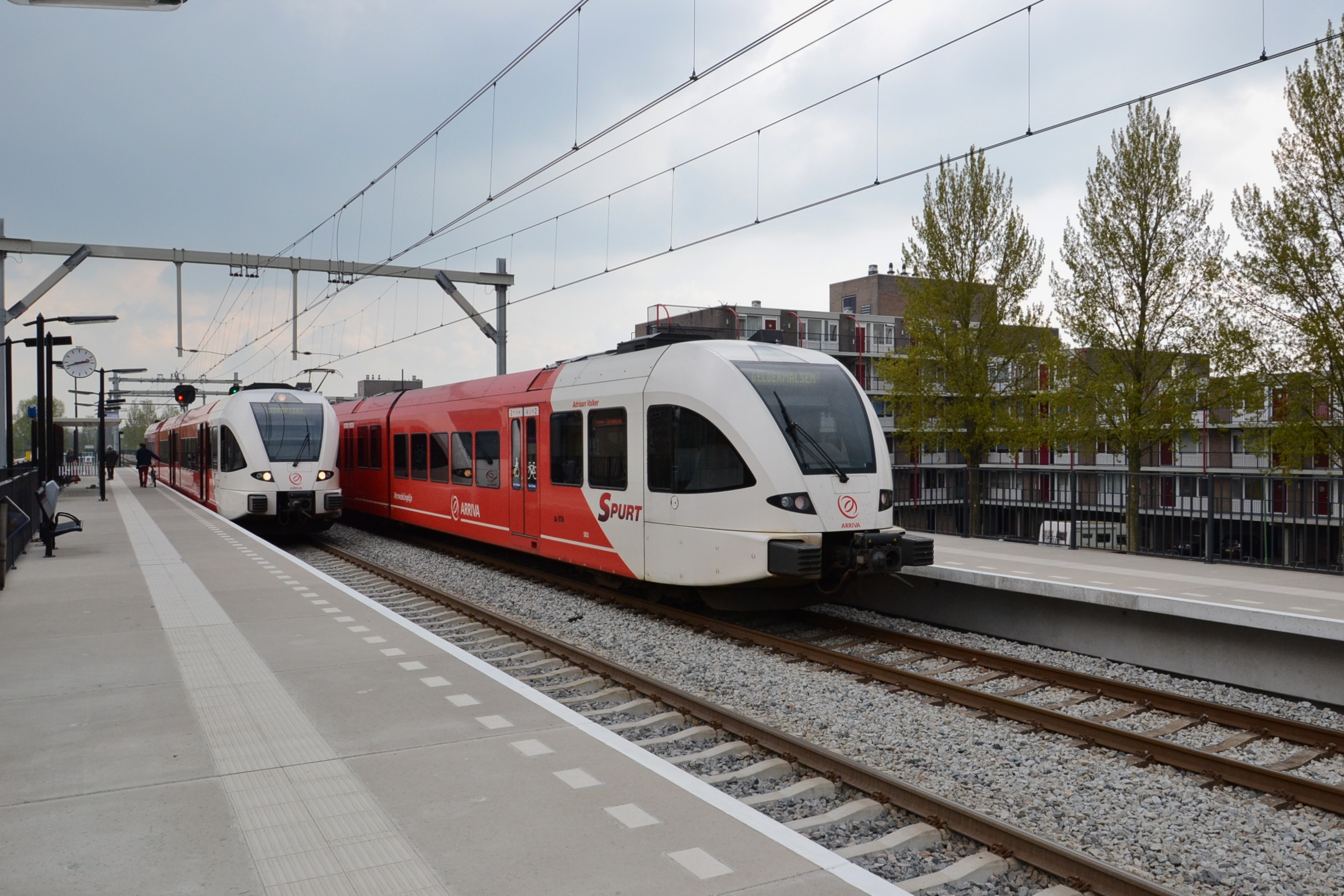
Trains on the MerwedeLingelijn

MerwedeLingelijn is a railway line in the Netherlands between Geldermalsen and Dordrecht, on the western part of the Elst–Dordrecht railway. Train services were operated by Arriva until 8 Dec 2018, when Qbuzz took over.

Since 5 September 2011 (original schedule was 2009) there is a quarter-hourly train service between Dordrecht and Gorinchem. A second track was added between Dordrecht and Dordrecht Stadspolders, and a passing track was built at Boven Hardinxveld, so that trains could pass each other. Between Gorinchem and Geldermalsen, there are two trains per hour.

Qbuzz uses seven train sets, the electric version of the Spurt, the same trains Arriva uses since late 2006 in Groningen and Friesland. These trains have been deployed since 14 September 2008, and have replaced the old Mat '64 trains. In 2011, three additional Spurt-trains were delivered to allow for the increased frequency. In 2019, these trains were re-branded with the R-net color scheme and branding. New train sets have been commissioned to CAF, a Spanish constructor, for delivery in 2027.

== Stations ==
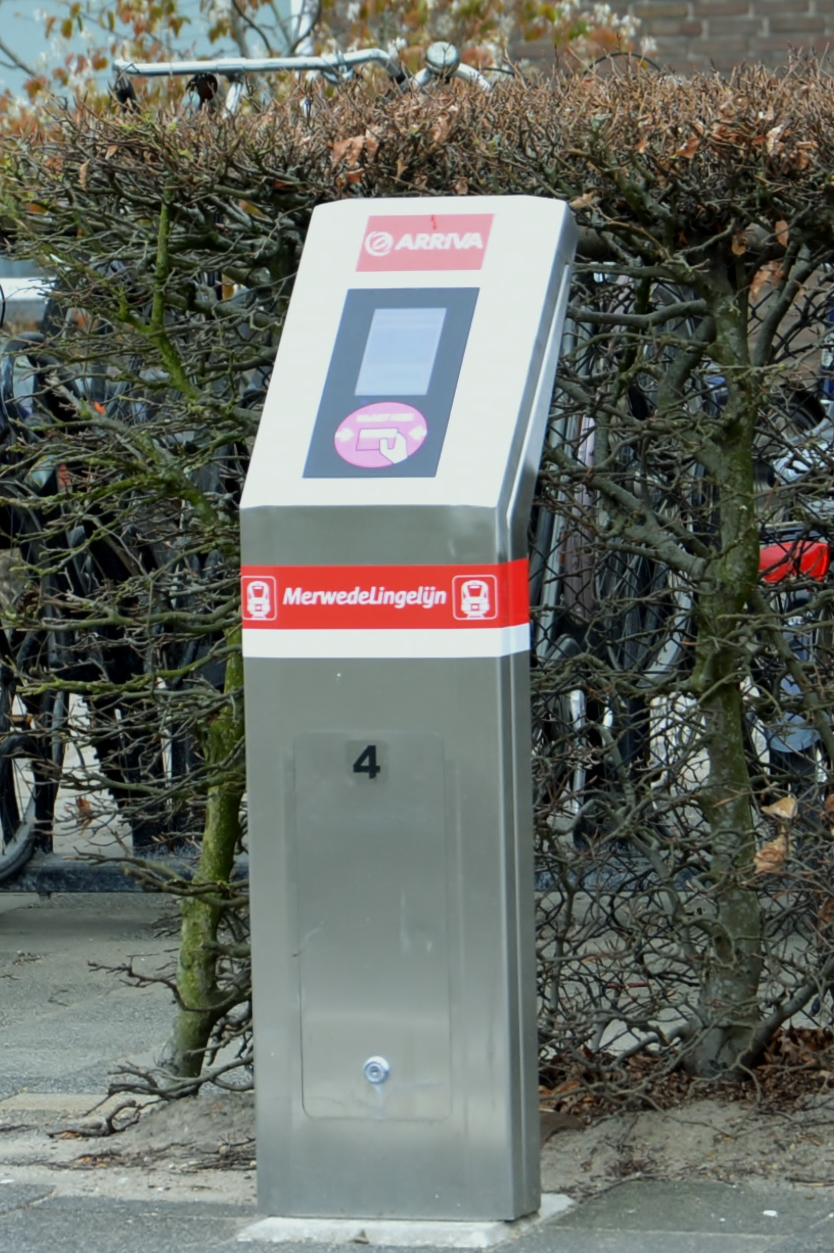
OV-Chipcard scanner

From east to west, the MerwedeLingelijn includes the following stations:

- Geldermalsen
- Beesd
- Leerdam
- Arkel
- Gorinchem
- Boven Hardinxveld
- Hardinxveld-Giessendam
- Hardinxveld Blauwe Zoom
- Sliedrecht
- Sliedrecht Baanhoek
- Dordrecht Stadspolders
- Dordrecht
