= Wadenoijen =

- Village
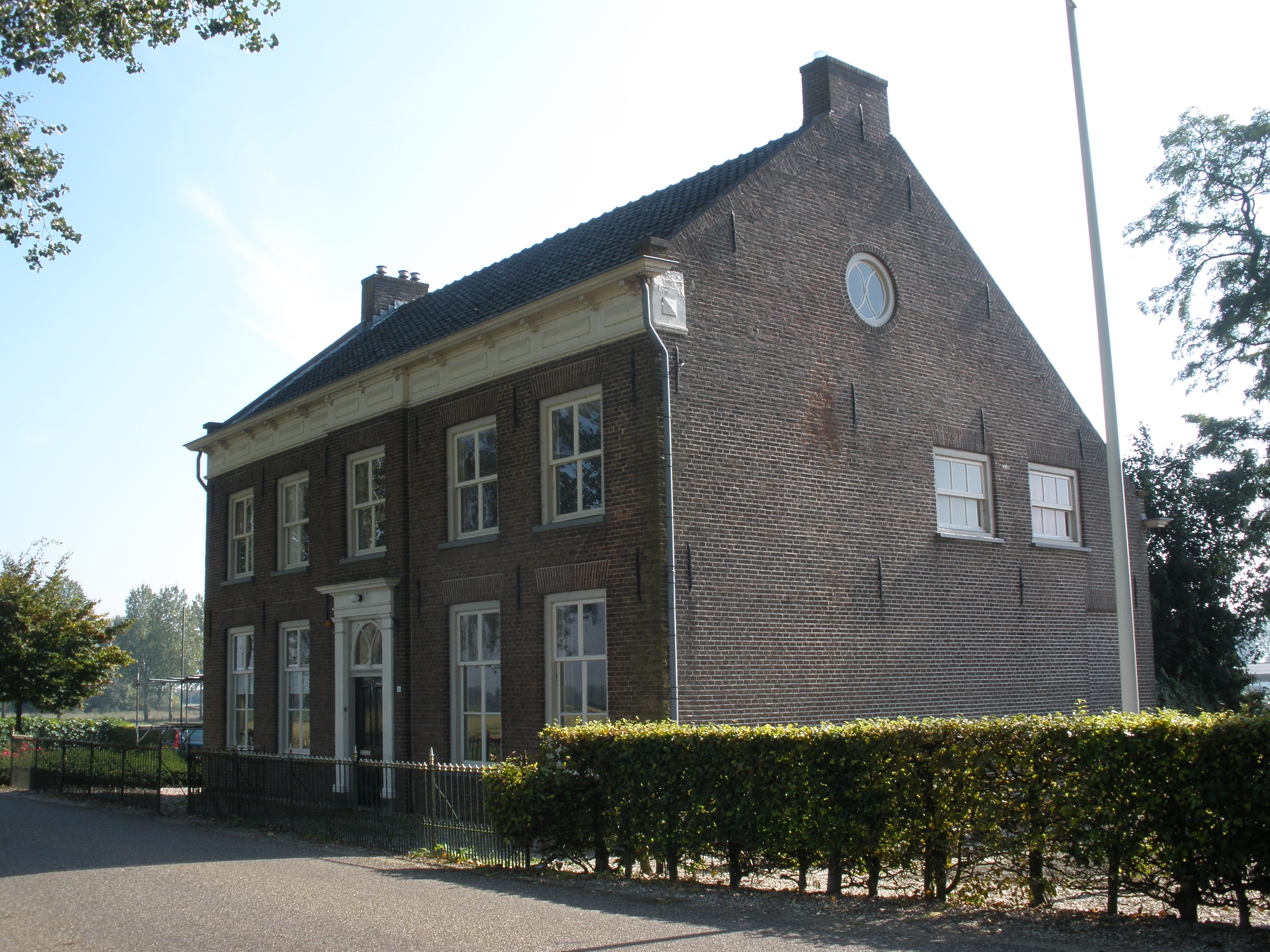
- Clergy house in Wadenoijen

- Coat of arms

- Location in the Netherlands Wadenoijen (Netherlands)
- Coordinates: 51°52′25″N 5°22′20″E
- Country: Netherlands
- Province: Gelderland
- Municipality: Tiel

Area
  - Total: 7.36 km^{2} (2.84 sq mi)

Population (2007)
  - Total: 1,150
  - Density: 156/km^{2} (405/sq mi)
- Time zone: UTC+1 (CET)
  - Summer (DST): UTC+2 (CEST)
- Postal code: 4014
- Dialing code: 0344

Wadenoijen is a village in the Dutch province of Gelderland. It is a part of the municipality of Tiel, and lies about 4 km west of Tiel.

Standing at the edge of the village, near the Linge river, is the village church, a building with a Romanesque tower and nave and a Gothic choir.

Wadenoijen was a separate municipality between 1818 and 1956, when the area was divided between the municipalities of Tiel and Zoelen.

== History ==
It was first mentioned in 107 as Vadam by Tacitus, and means "fordable place near a stream". The village developed on a sandy ridge along the Waal. The Dutch Reformed Church dates from the 11th century and has a tower which was enlarged around 1250.

The pumping mill Poldermolen was built in 1888 as a replacement of a wind mill which burned down in 1887. In the 1970s, the location became problematic, because it could no longer pump water. In 2010, it was decided to move the windmill to Ophemert and since 2018, it is back in operation.

In 1840, it was home to 577 people. Between 1882 until 1950, it had a railway station. In 2007, Tiel Passewaaij railway station opened near the village.

== Gallery ==
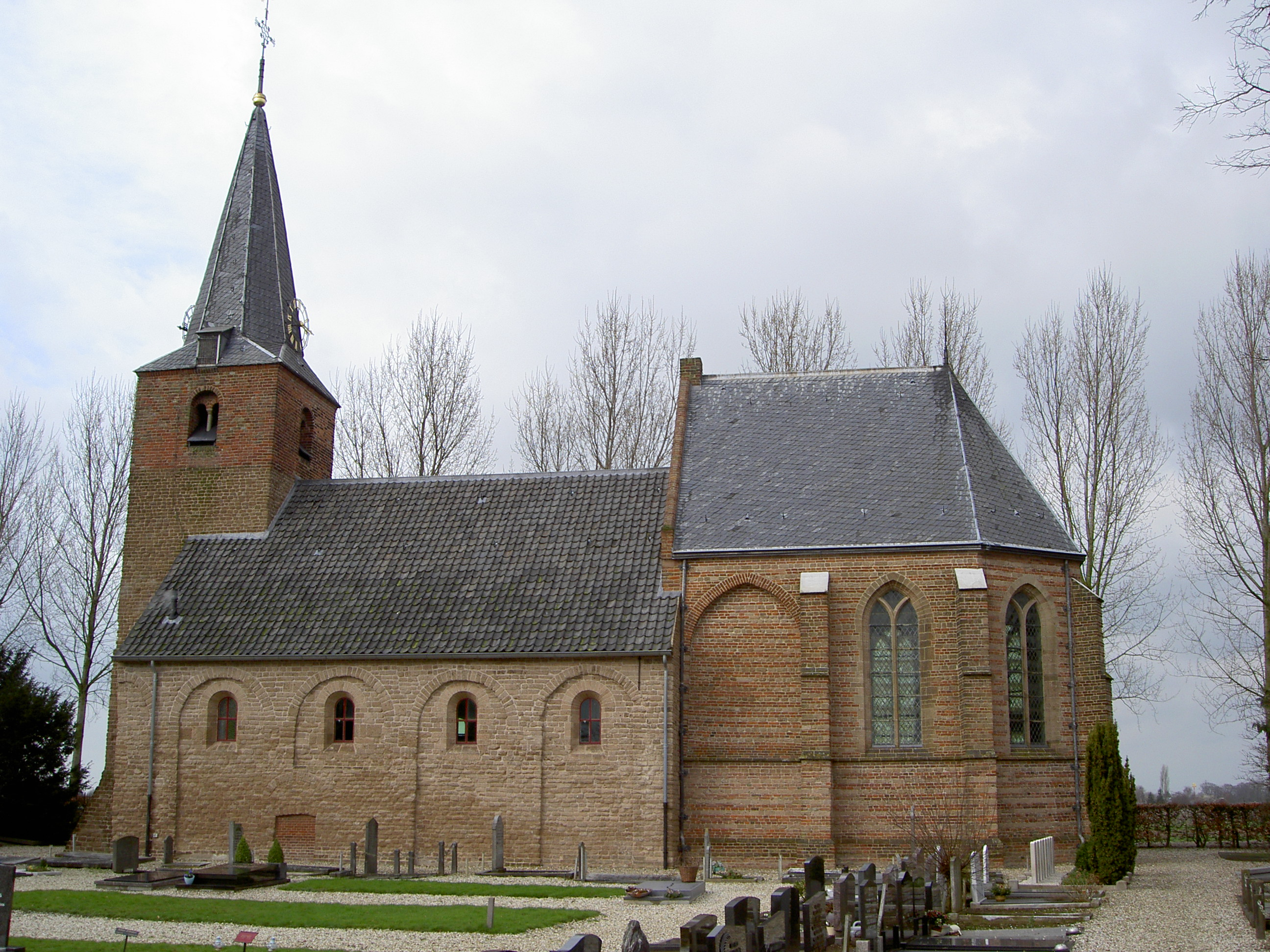
Church of Wadenoijen

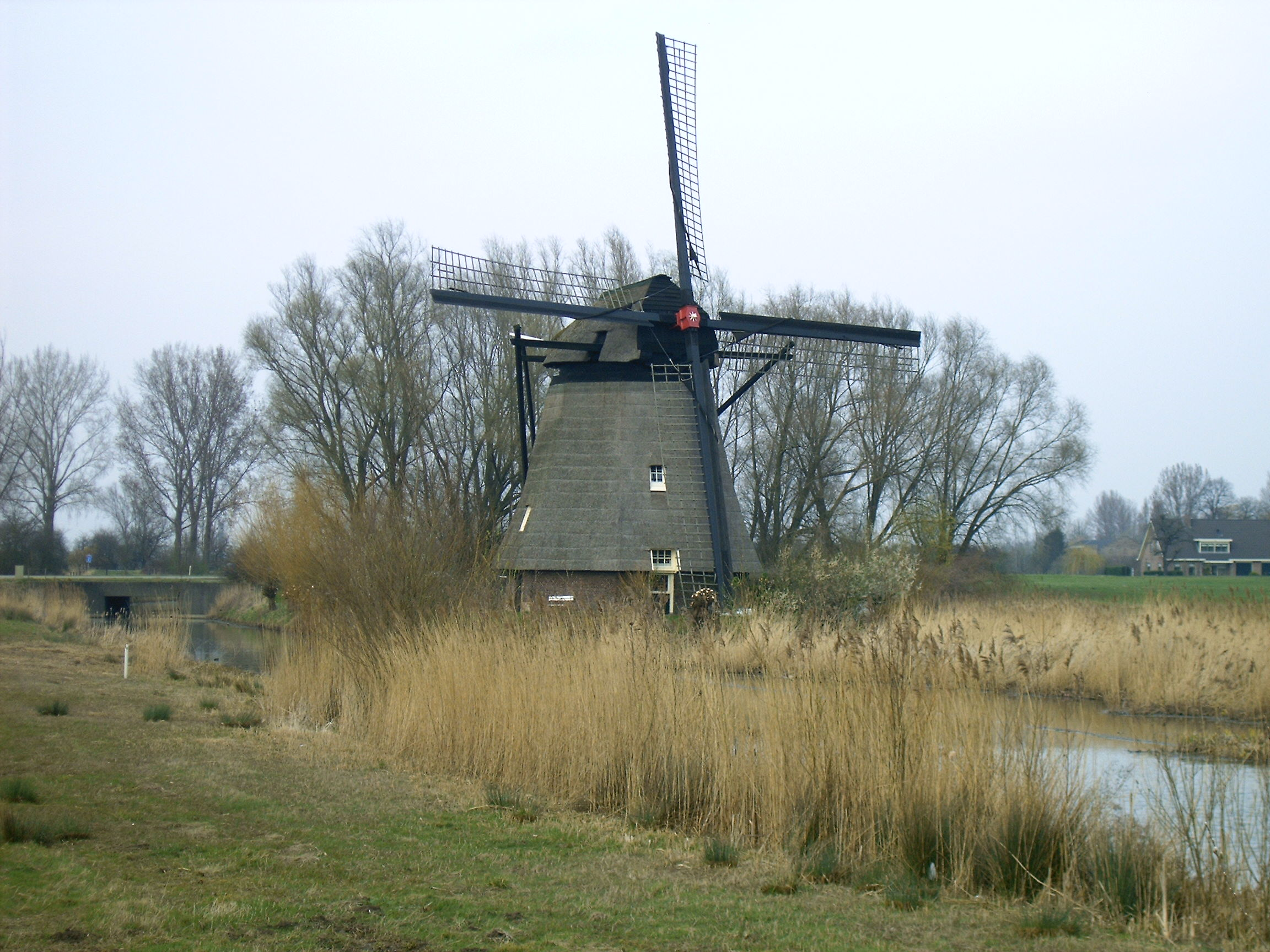
Poldermolen at Wadenoijen

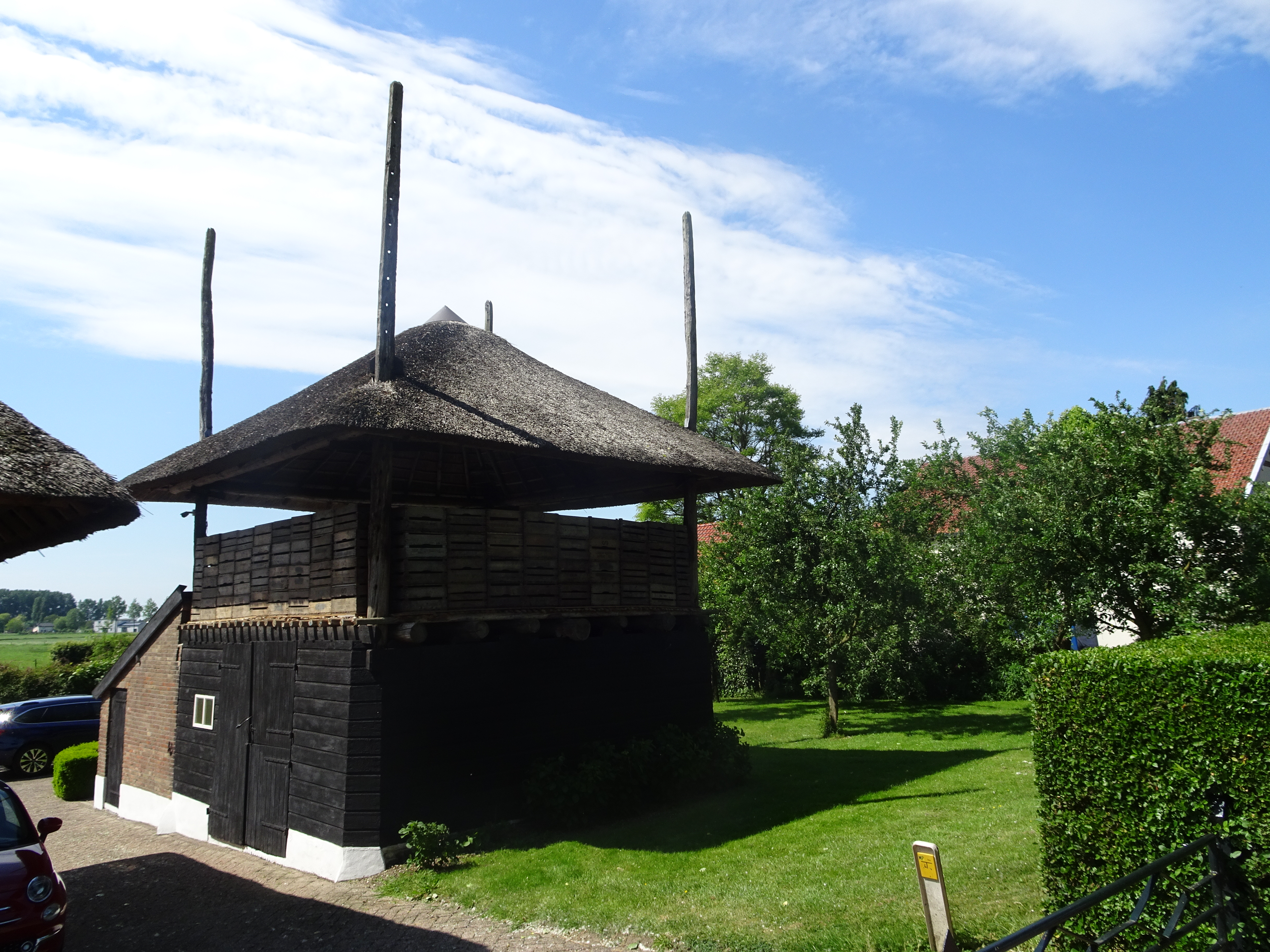
Hay stack

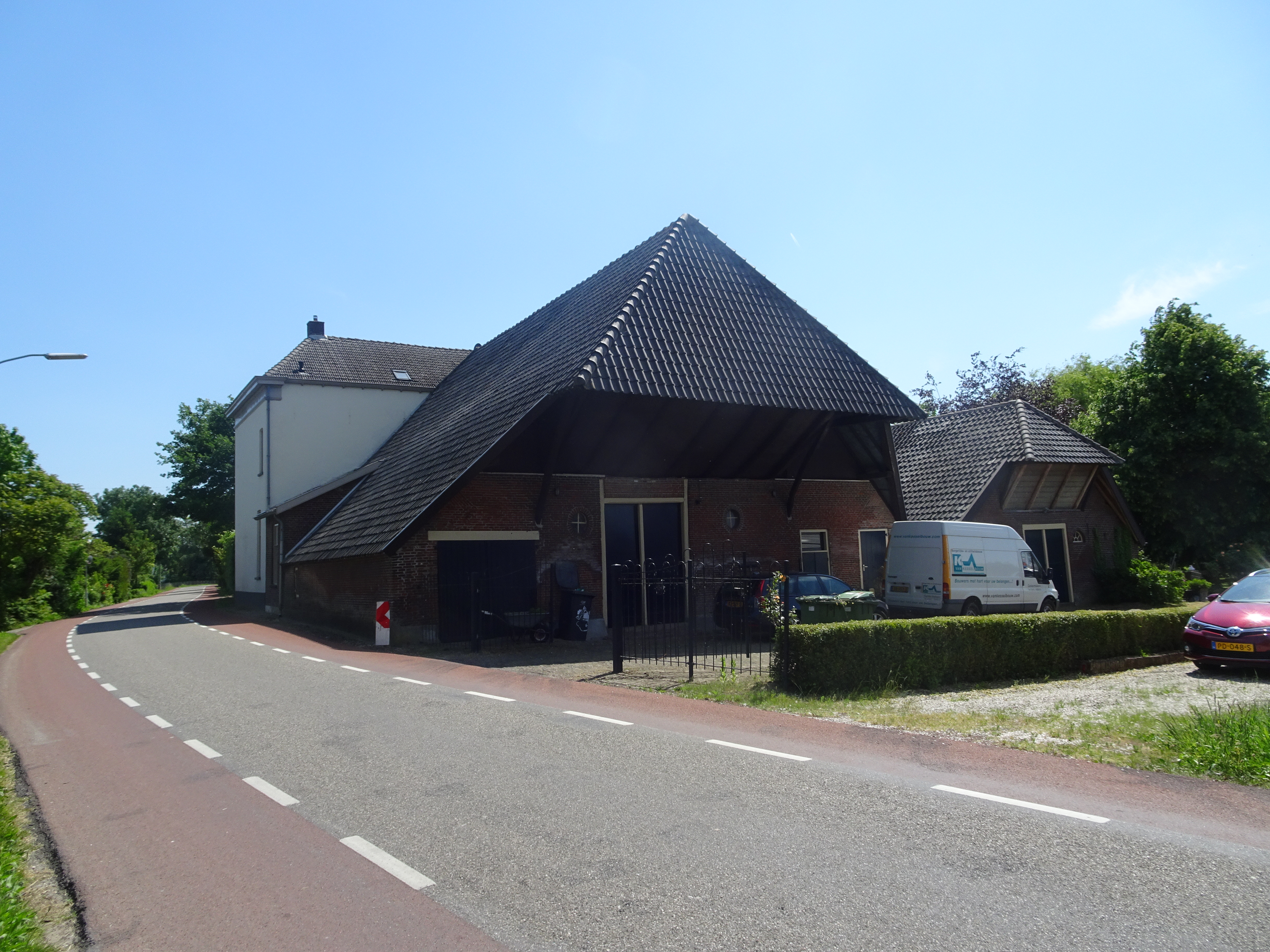
Farm in Wadenoijen
