= Beesd =

- Village
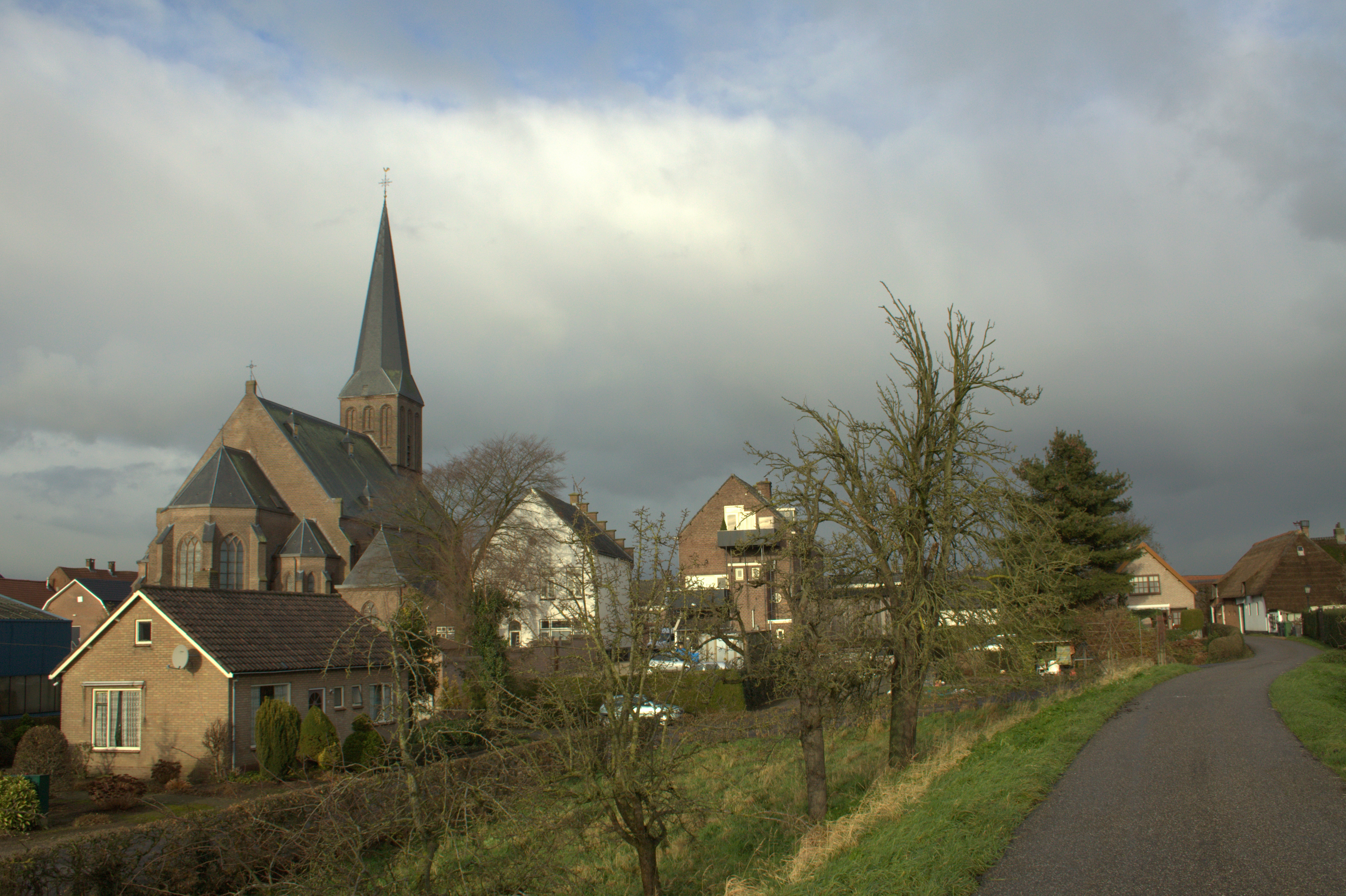
- View on Beesd

- Flag Coat of arms

- Location in the Netherlands Beesd (Netherlands)
- Coordinates: 51°53′15″N 5°11′28″E
- Country: Netherlands
- Province: Gelderland
- Municipality: West Betuwe

Area
  - Total: 21.02 km^{2} (8.12 sq mi)
- Elevation: 3.2 m (10 ft)

Population (2021)
  - Total: 3,360
  - Density: 160/km^{2} (414/sq mi)
- Time zone: UTC+1 (CET)
  - Summer (DST): UTC+2 (CEST)
- Postal code: 4153
- Dialing code: 0345

Beesd is a village in the Netherlands province of Gelderland. It is a part of the municipality of West Betuwe, and lies about 16 km west of Tiel. It is situated near the river Linge and has a railway station on the railway from Dordrecht to Geldermalsen.

== History ==
Beesd was first mentioned in 1224 as "in Beseth". The etymology is unclear. Beesd was founded in the Early Middle Ages on a stream ridge. It developed into a stretched out esdorp.

The Dutch Reformed church is an aisleless church with detached tower. The lower part of tower dates from around 1500. The current church is the result of an extensive modification and rebuilding in 1825.

Beesd was home to 1,282 people in 1840. Beesd was an independent municipality. In 1883, Beesd railway station opened on the Dordrecht to Elst railway line. The building was demolished in 1985, but it is still an active station.

In 1978, it was merged into Geldermalsen. In 2019, it became part of West Betuwe.

== Notable people ==
- Abraham Kuyper, pastor, journalist, and Prime Minister of the Netherlands. Kuyper served as the pastor of the Reformed Church in Beesd from 1863 to 1867.

== Gallery ==
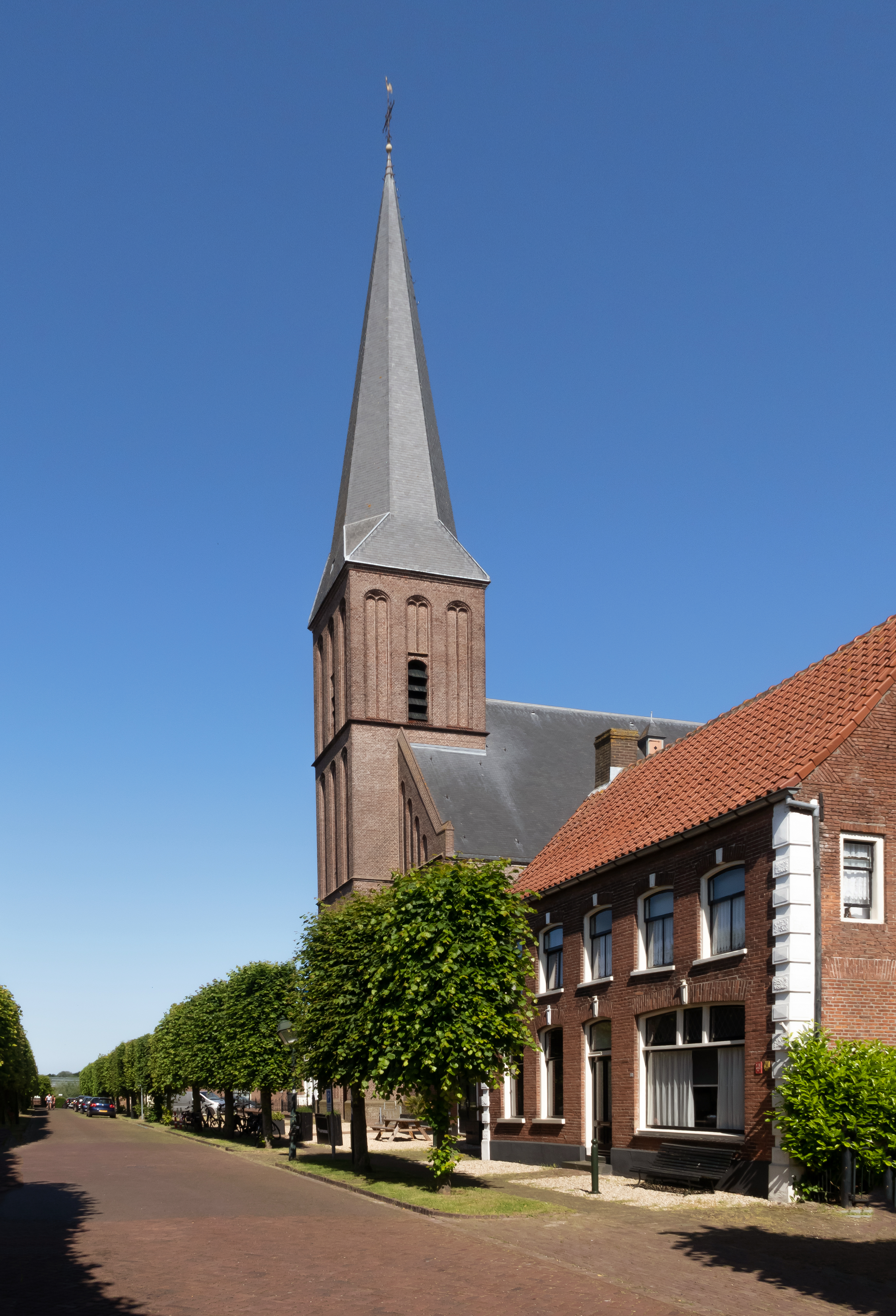
Beesd, church: Kerk de Heilige Kruisverheffing

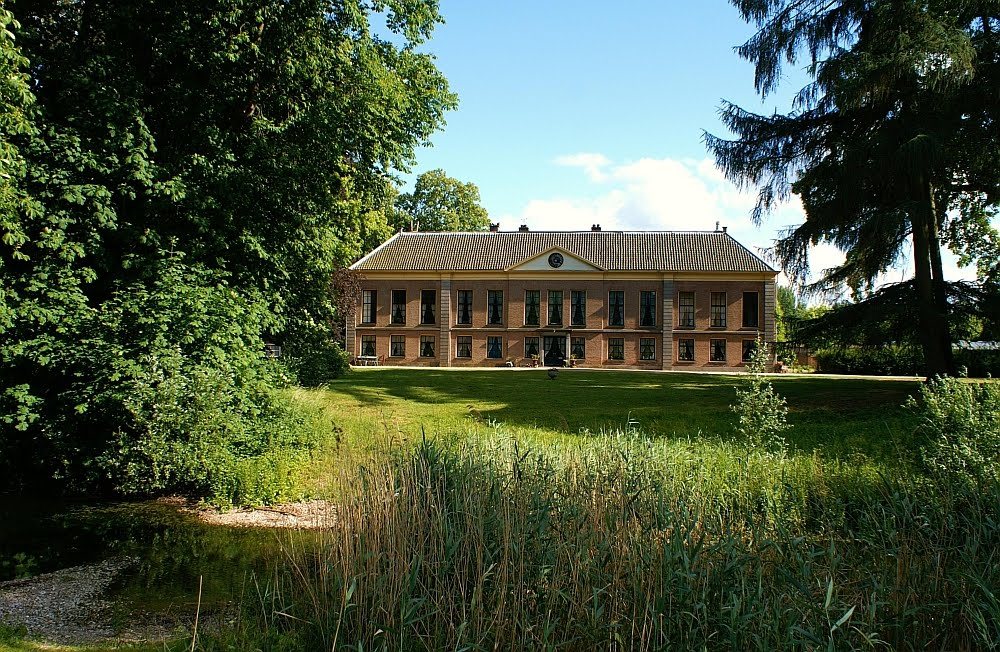
Mariënwaerdt

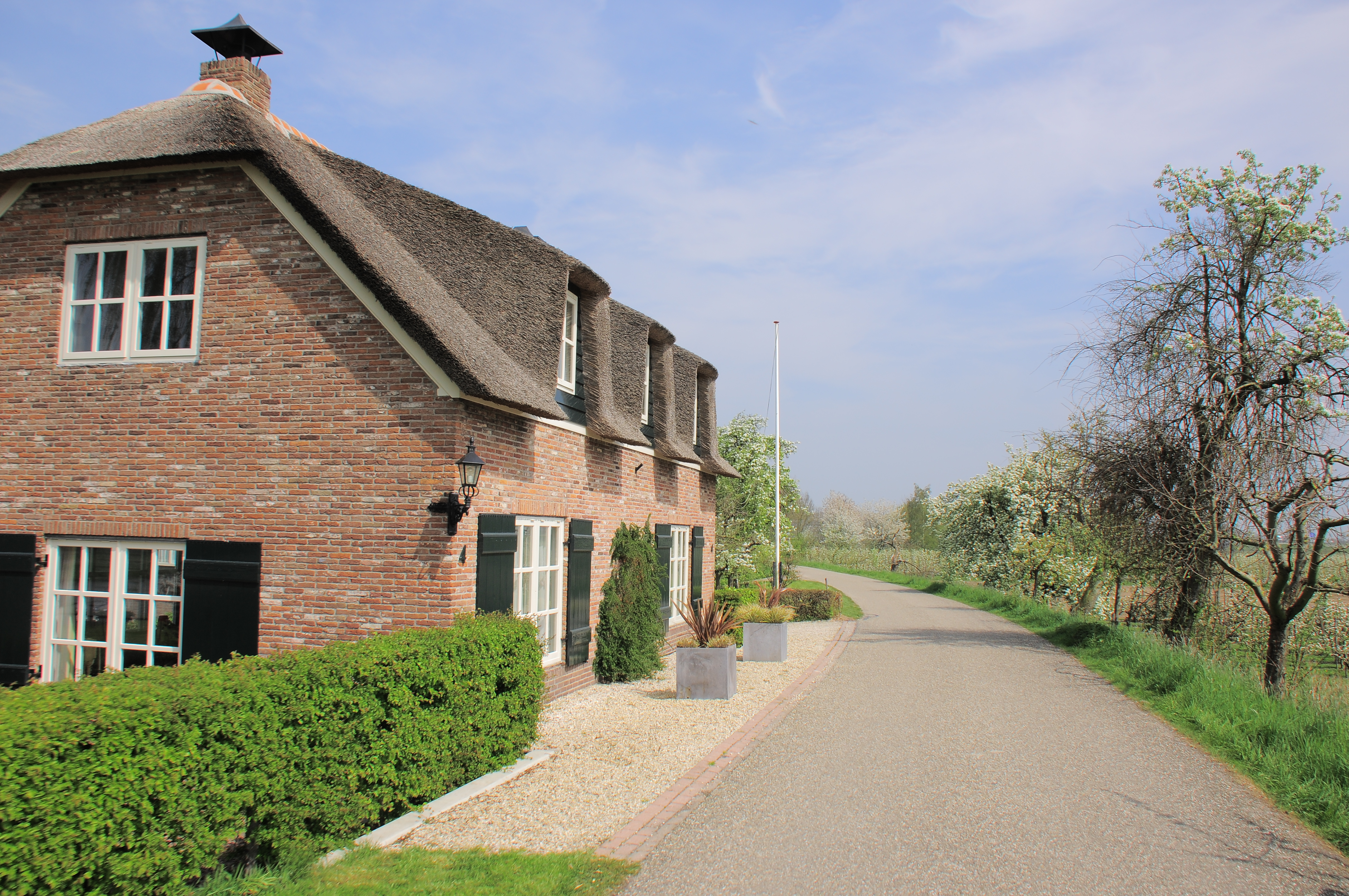
House along the dike

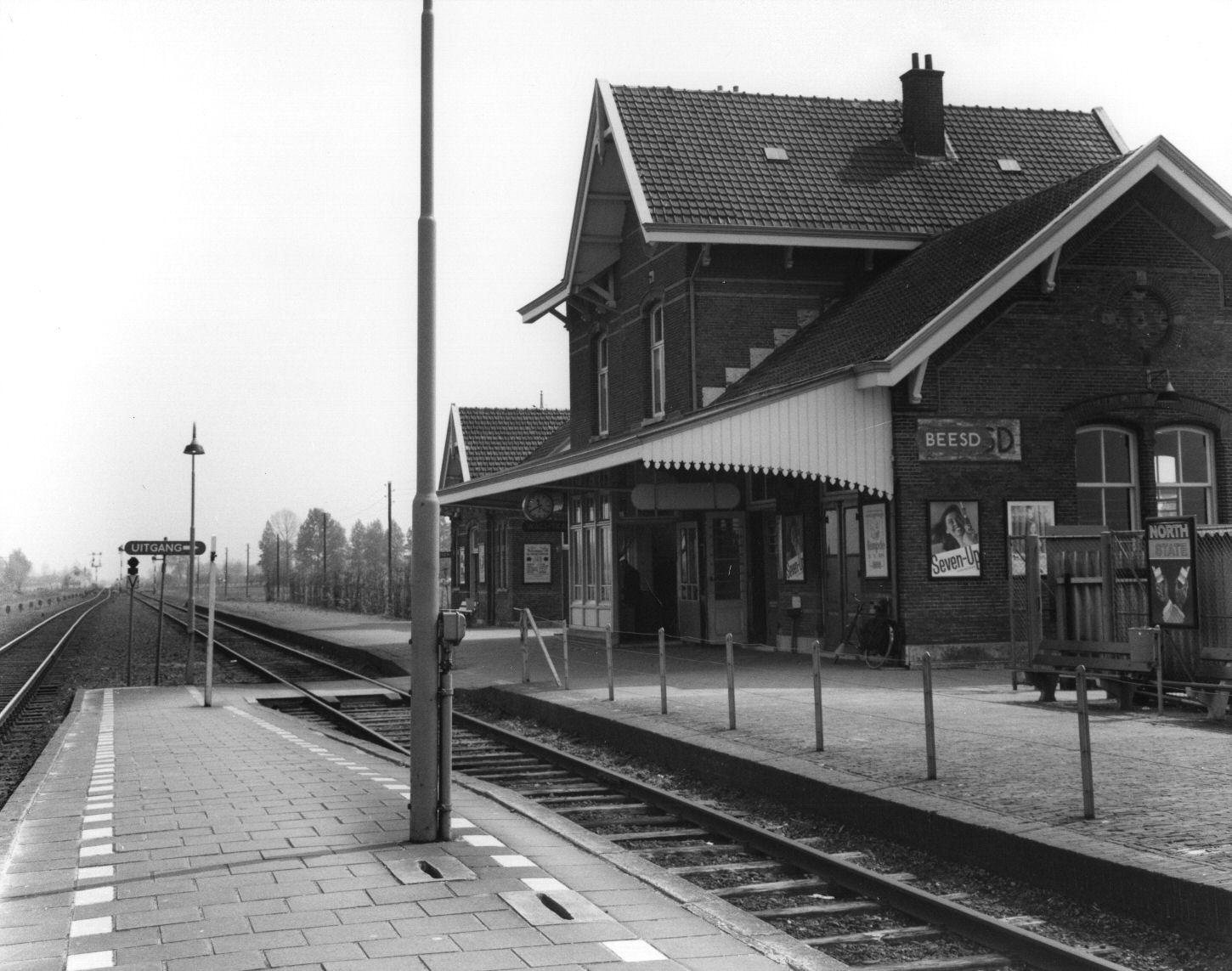
Railway station (building has been demolished)
