= Tiel Passewaaij railway station =

Railway station in the Netherlands

Tiel Passewaaij
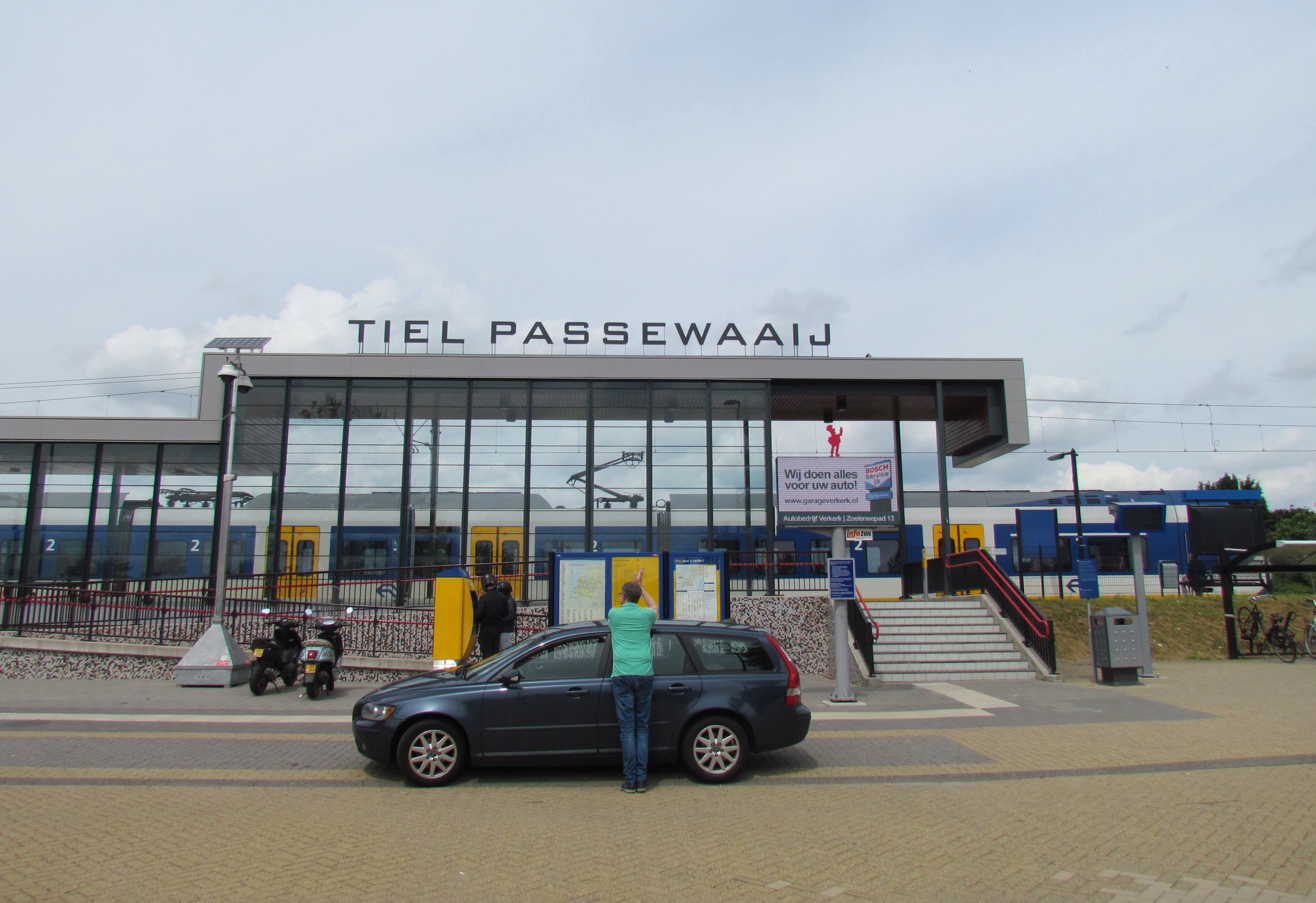
- Tiel Passewaaij railway station in 2017

General information
- Location: Netherlands
- Coordinates: 51°52′26″N 5°23′32″E
- Line: Elst–Dordrecht railway

History
- Opened: 14 April 2007

Services
Preceding station	Nederlandse Spoorwegen	Following station
Geldermalsen towards Leiden Centraal	NS Sprinter 6700 After 18:00 and Fri-Sun	Tiel Terminus
Geldermalsen towards Den Haag Centraal	NS Sprinter 6900 Mon-Thur until 18:00	Tiel Terminus
Location
- Location within Netherlands

Tiel Passewaaij is a railway station located in Tiel, Netherlands.

== History ==
The station originally opened on 14 April 2007 and is located on the Elst–Dordrecht railway. Train services are currently operated by NS.

== Train services ==
Route	Service type	Operator	Notes
Woerden - Utrecht - Geldermalsen - Tiel	Local ("Sprinter")	NS	2x per hour

== Bus services ==
Line	Route	Operator	Notes
46	(Tiel Passewaaij -) Tiel Station - Kerk-Avezaath - Erichem - Buren - Asch - Zoelmond - Beusichem - Culemborg	Arriva and Juijn	During weekday daytime hours, this bus runs through to Tiel Passewaaij. Arriva operates this bus during weekday daytime hours, Juijn during evenings and weekends.
243	Tiel - Wadenoijen	Arriva	This bus only operates if called one hour before its supposed departure ("belbus"). During weekday daytime hours, this bus runs non-stop between Wadenoijen and either Tiel or Tiel Passewaaij station and vice versa. On evenings and weekends, it does make all local bus stops.
