= Leerdam railway station =

Railway station in the Netherlands

Leerdam
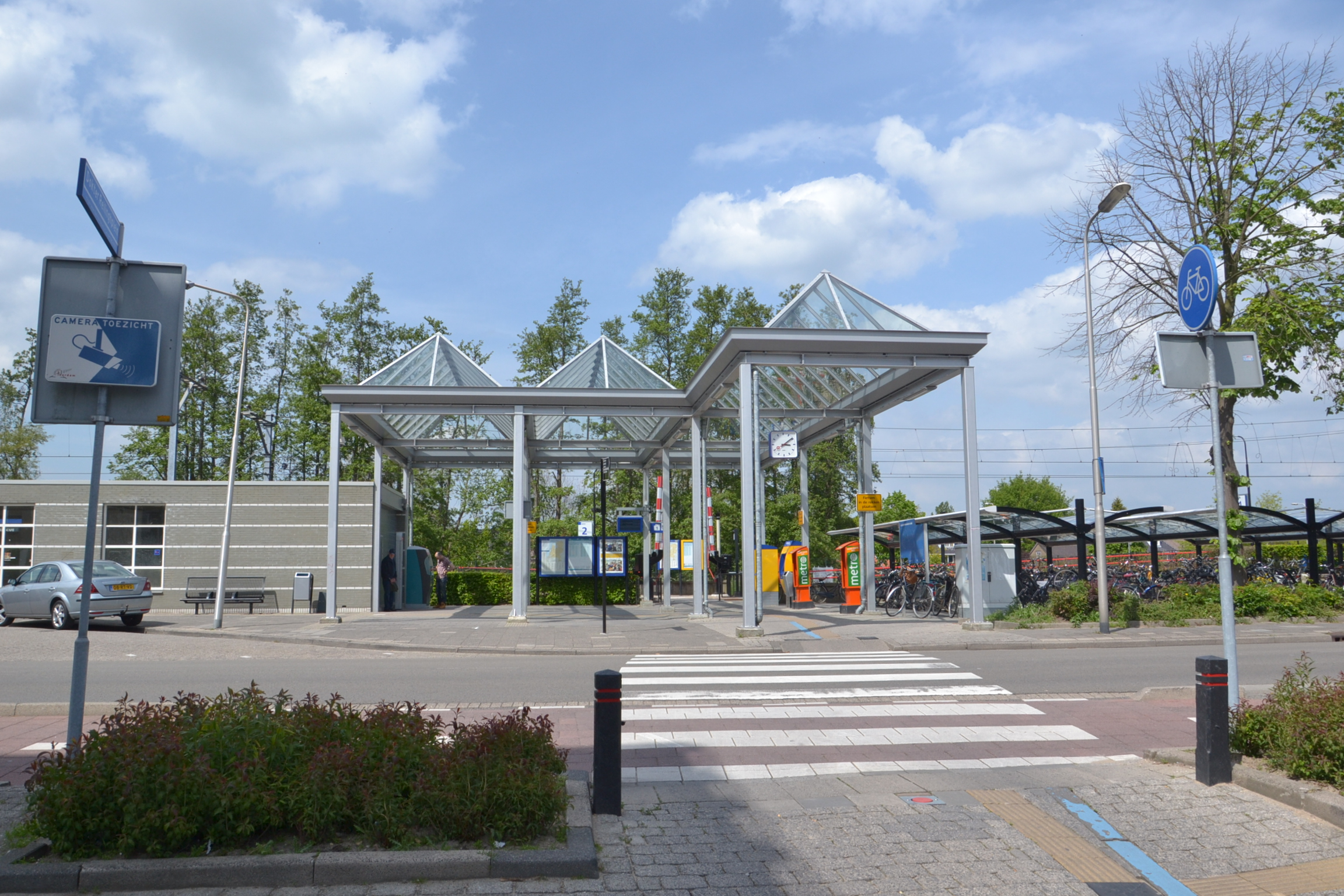
- The current entrance.

General information
- Location: Stationsweg, Leerdam; Netherlands
- Coordinates: 51°53′41″N 5°5′36″E
- Operator: Qbuzz
- Line: MerwedeLingelijn
- Platforms: 2
- Tracks: 2

Construction
- Cycle facilities: Bicycle racks and free on train
- Architect: Cees Douma

Other information
- Station code: Ldm

History
- Opened: 1 December 1883
- Rebuilt: 1987

Services
Preceding station	Qbuzz	Following station
Arkel towards Dordrecht	Line 7200	Beesd towards Geldermalsen
Location
- Location within Netherlands

The Leerdam railway station is located in the western Netherlands, on the MerwedeLingelijn line between Dordrecht and Geldermalsen. The railway station was opened on 1 December 1883. Train services are operated by Qbuzz.

== History ==
A new station building was opened in 1987, next to the former building. It was designed by Cees Douma. The former building was maintained and is currently serving as a restaurant.

Arriva operated the service until 8 December 2018, after which the service was taken over by Qbuzz.

== Train services ==
Route	Service type	Operator	Notes
Dordrecht - Gorinchem - Geldermalsen	Local ("Stoptrein")	Qbuzz	2x per hour

== Bus services ==
Line	Route	Operator	Notes
85	Leerdam - Schoonrewoerd - Vianen - Utrecht Papendorp - Utrecht Centraal	U-OV	
141	Leerdam - Asperen - Heukelum - Leerdam	Arriva	Weekdays only. Not after 19:55.
260	Geldermalsen - Deil - Enspijk - Beesd - Rumpt - Rhenoy - Acquoy - Asperen - Leerdam	Arriva	On evenings and Sundays, this bus only operates if called one hour before its supposed departure ("belbus").
503	Leerdam - Schoonrewoerd - Hei- en Boeicop - Lexmond	U-OV	This bus only operates if called one hour before its supposed departure ("belbus").
572	Leerdam - Leerbroek - Nieuwland - Meerkerk Knooppunt A27	U-OV	This bus only operates if called one hour before its supposed departure ("belbus").
650	Leerdam - Rhenoy - Rumpt - Beesd - Culemborg	Juijn	One run during morning rush hour from Leerdam to Culemborg and two vice versa in the afternoon rush hour.
703	Ameide - Meerkerk - Leerbroek - Leerdam - Schoonrewoerd - Hei- en Boeicop - Lexmond	U-OV	Mon-Fri during daytime hours only.
704	Leerdam - Kedichem - Arkel	Qbuzz	Mon-Fri 1x per hour during daytime hours only, and two runs in both directions on Saturdays.

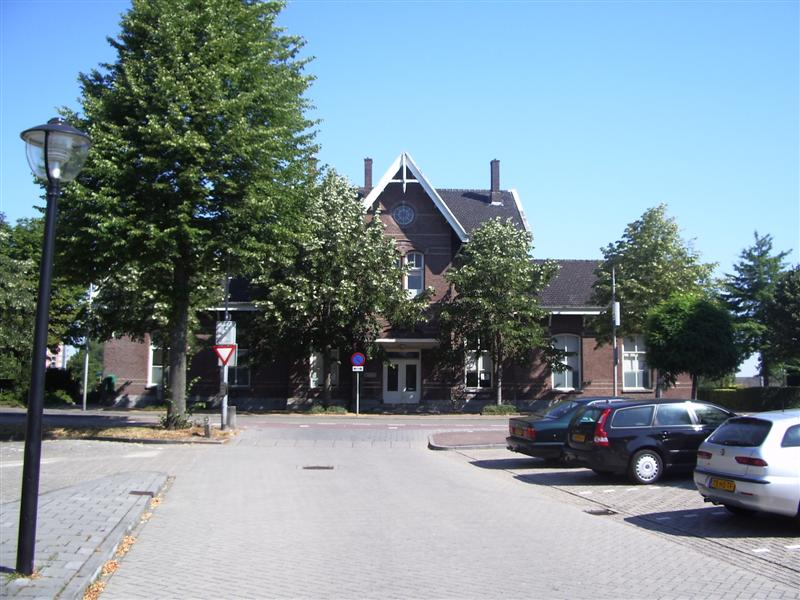
The former railway station building

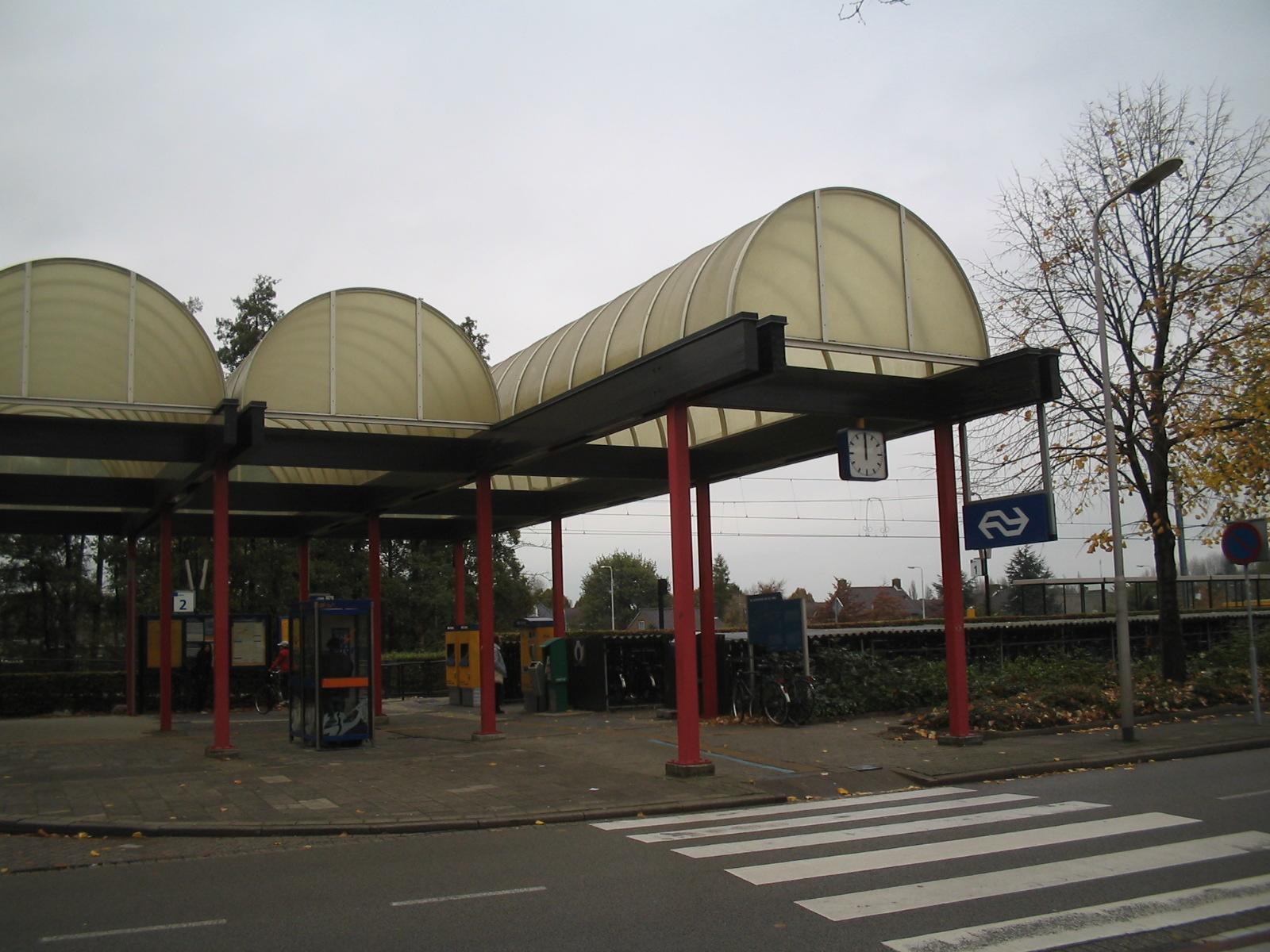
The former main entrance
