= Arkel railway station =

Railway station in the Netherlands

Arkel
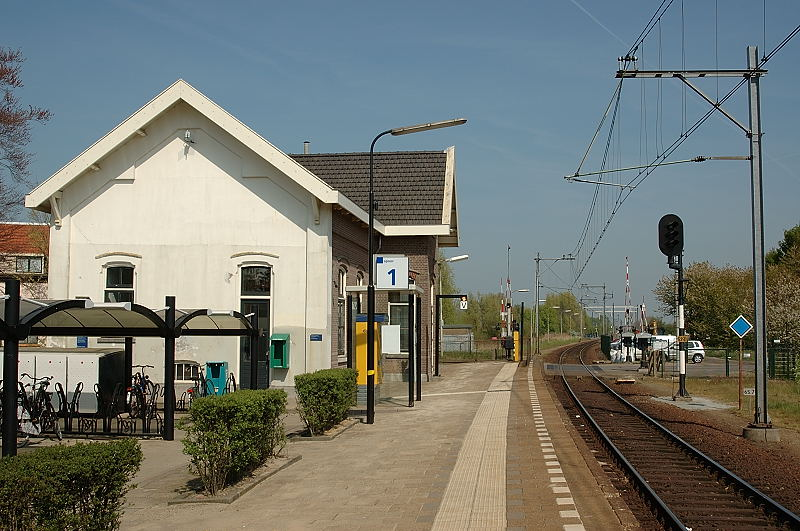
- The station building, and the single track

General information
- Location: Netherlands
- Coordinates: 51°52′19″N 4°59′34″E
- Operator: Qbuzz
- Line: MerwedeLingelijn
- Platforms: 1

Construction
- Cycle facilities: Bicycle parking racks and free on train

Other information
- Station code: Akl

History
- Opened: 1883, reopened 1940
- Closed: 1938

Services
| Preceding station | Arriva Netherlands | Following station |
|---|---|---|
| Gorinchem towards Dordrecht | Stoptrein 36700 | Leerdam towards Geldermalsen |
Location
- Location within Netherlands

Arkel is a railway station, located in Arkel in the Netherlands. The station is located on the Qbuzz line between Dordrecht and Geldermalsen. It was opened on 1 December 1883, was closed on 15 May 1938 and was reopened on 10 June 1940. Originally, Arkel had two tracks, in the 1980s this was reduced to a single track. Train services are operated by Qbuzz. The station building is now in use as an office.

== Train services ==
| Route | Service type | Operator | Notes |
|---|---|---|---|
| Dordrecht - Gorinchem - Geldermalsen | Local ("Stoptrein") | Qbuzz | 2x per hour |

== Bus services ==
| Line | Route | Operator | Notes |
|---|---|---|---|
| 80 | Gorinchem - Arkel - Meerkerk | Qbuzz | Mon-Fri during daytime hours only. |
| 704 | Leerdam - Kedichem - Arkel | Qbuzz | Mon-Fri 1x per hour during daytime hours only, and two runs in both directions on Saturdays. |
| 705 | Arkel - Hoogblokland - Hoornaar - Gorinchem | Qbuzz | Mon-Fri 1x per hour during daytime hours only, and two runs in both directions on Saturdays. |
| 934 | Hoogblokland - Arkel | Qbuzz | This bus only operates if called one hour before its supposed departure ("belbus"). |
| 941 | Arkel Dorp - Arkel Station | Qbuzz | This bus only operates if called one hour before its supposed departure ("belbus"). |
| 944 | Noordeloos - Arkel | Qbuzz | This bus only operates if called one hour before its supposed departure ("belbus"). |
