= Tiel railway station =

Railway station in the Netherlands

Tiel
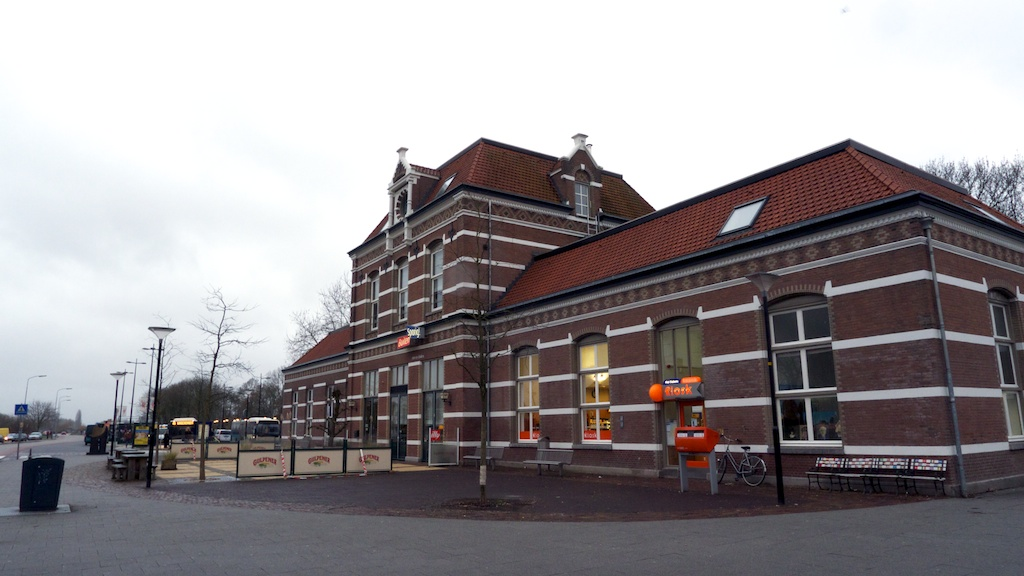
- Tiel station building in 2011

General information
- Location: Netherlands
- Coordinates: 51°53′22″N 5°25′21″E
- Line: Elst–Dordrecht railway

History
- Opened: 1 Nov 1882

Services
Preceding station	Nederlandse Spoorwegen	Following station
Tiel Passewaaij towards Leiden Centraal	NS Sprinter 6700 After 18:00 and Fri-Sun	Terminus
Tiel Passewaaij towards Den Haag Centraal	NS Sprinter 6900 Mon-Thur until 18:00	Terminus
Preceding station	Arriva Netherlands	Following station
Terminus	Stoptrein 31100	Kesteren towards Arnhem Centraal
Location
- Location within Netherlands

Tiel is a railway station located in Tiel, Netherlands. The station opened on 1 November 1882 and is on the Elst–Dordrecht railway. Train services are operated by Nederlandse Spoorwegen and Arriva.

The station is the end of the electrified line from Geldermalsen. The line to Elst remains non-electrified.

== Train services ==
Route	Service type	Operator	Notes
Woerden - Utrecht - Geldermalsen - Tiel	Local ("Sprinter")	NS	2x per hour
Elst - Arnhem Centraal	Local ("Stoptrein")	Arriva	2x per hour: 1x per hour to Elst and 1x per hour to Arnhem - Evenings and weekends 1x per hour to Arnhem. Does not stop at Arnhem Zuid.

== Bus services ==
Line	Route	Operator	Notes
42	Tiel - Beneden-Leeuwen - Boven-Leeuwen - Druten	Arriva and Breng	
44	Tiel - Maurikseveld - Maurik - Eck en Wiel - Ingen - Ommeren - Lienden - Kesteren - Rhenen - Wageningen	Juijn, Arriva and Krol Reizen	On weekdays, this bus does not operate after 21:00 (only on weekends).
45	Tiel - Echteld - IJzendoorn - Ochten - Kesteren - Rhenen - Wageningen	Juijn and Arriva	On weekends, this bus only operates between Tiel and Kesteren.
46	(Tiel Passewaaij -) Tiel Station - Kerk-Avezaath - Erichem - Buren - Asch - Zoelmond - Beusichem - Culemborg	Arriva and Juijn	During weekday daytime hours, this bus runs through to Tiel Passewaaij. Arriva operates this bus during weekday daytime hours, Juijn during evenings and weekends.
243	Tiel - Wadenoijen	Arriva	This bus only operates if called one hour before its supposed departure ("belbus"). During weekday daytime hours, this bus runs non-stop between Wadenoijen and either Tiel or Tiel Passewaaij station and vice versa. On evenings and weekends, it does make all local bus stops.
244	Tiel - Zoelen	Arriva	This bus only operates if called one hour before its supposed departure ("belbus").
248	Tiel - Ophemert - Varik - Heesselt - Opijnen - Neerijen - Waardenburg - Zaltbommel	Arriva	On evenings and weekends, this bus only operates if called one hour before its supposed departure ("belbus").
544	Tiel - Geldermalsen Poppenbouwing - Geldermalsen Station	Arriva	3 runs during morning rush hour, 1 run around noon and 1 run during afternoon rush hour.
648	Waardenburg → Neerijnen → Opijnen → Heesselt → Varik → Ophemert → Tiel	Krol Reizen	1 run during morning rush hour only.
844	Tiel - Maurik - Eck en Wiel - Ingen - Ommeren - Lienden - Kesteren	Arriva	This bus only operates on weekdays after 21:00. From Tiel Station and within Tiel's town centre, this bus can be boarded at any time, but from other stops along the route, it only operates if called one hour before its supposed departure ("belbus").
