= Gorinchem railway station =

Railway station in the Netherlands

Gorinchem
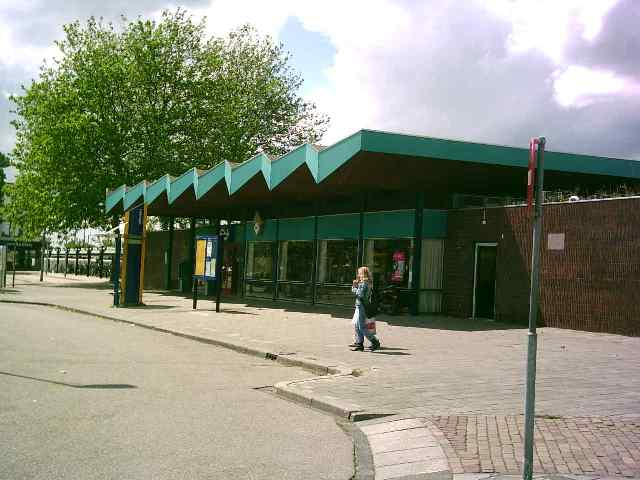
- The new station building.

General information
- Location: Stationsplein, Gorinchem; Netherlands
- Coordinates: 51°50′1″N 4°58′3″E
- Operator: Qbuzz
- Line: MerwedeLingelijn
- Platforms: 2

Construction
- Cycle facilities: Bicycle parking racks and free on train

Other information
- Station code: Gr

History
- Opened: 1 December 1883
- Rebuilt: 1971

Services
Preceding station	Qbuzz	Following station
Boven Hardinxveld towards Dordrecht	Line 7200	Arkel towards Geldermalsen
Boven Hardinxveld towards Dordrecht	Line 36800	Terminus
Location
- Location within Netherlands

Gorinchem is a railway station in the town of Gorinchem, Netherlands. It is on the MerwedeLingelijn. It was opened on 1 December 1883. Train services are operated by Qbuzz.

The original railway building was built to look like Sneek railway station, a building type known in Dutch as "Standaardtype Sneek". The current railway building, designed by Cees Douma, was opened in 1971, and the old building was demolished.

== Train service ==
The station is served by the following services:

- 2x per hour local services (stoptrein) Dordrecht - Gorinchem - Geldermalsen
- 2x per hour local services (stoptrein) Dordrecht - Gorinchem

== Bus services ==
The following bus services stop at Station Gorinchem:

47, 73, 74, 76, 77, 78, 79, 81, 121, 181, 228, 230, 231, 387, 674, 701, 705

Destinations by bus include:

- Geldermalsen, Leerdam, Gelkenes, Giessenburg, Giessen-Oudekerk, Hardinxveld-Giessendam, Hardinxveld, Sliedrecht, Utrecht, Arkel, Gorinchem Town

For more information on the routes see

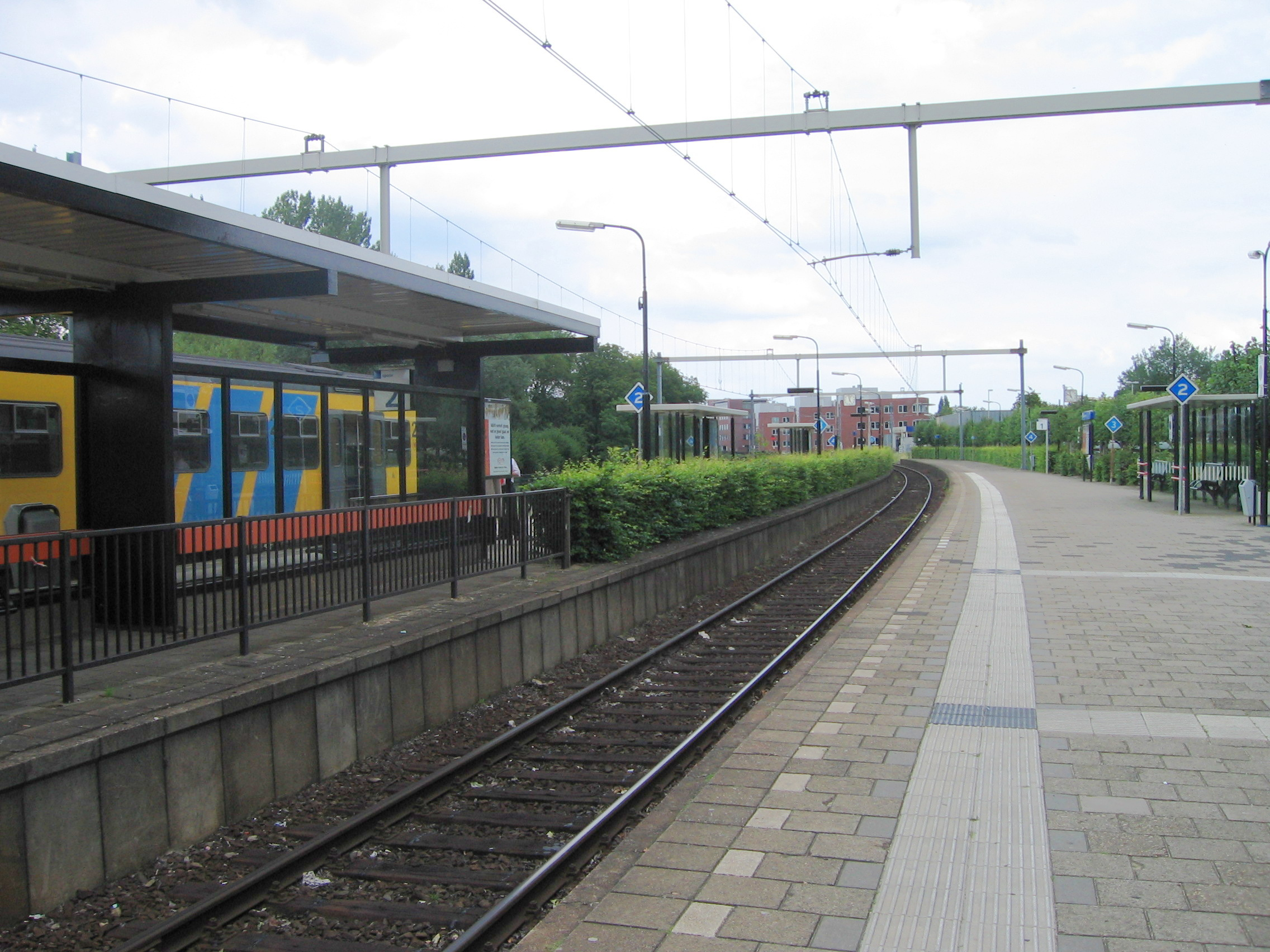
The station's platforms with the old NS rolling stock.
