= Elst–Dordrecht railway =

Railway line in Netherlands

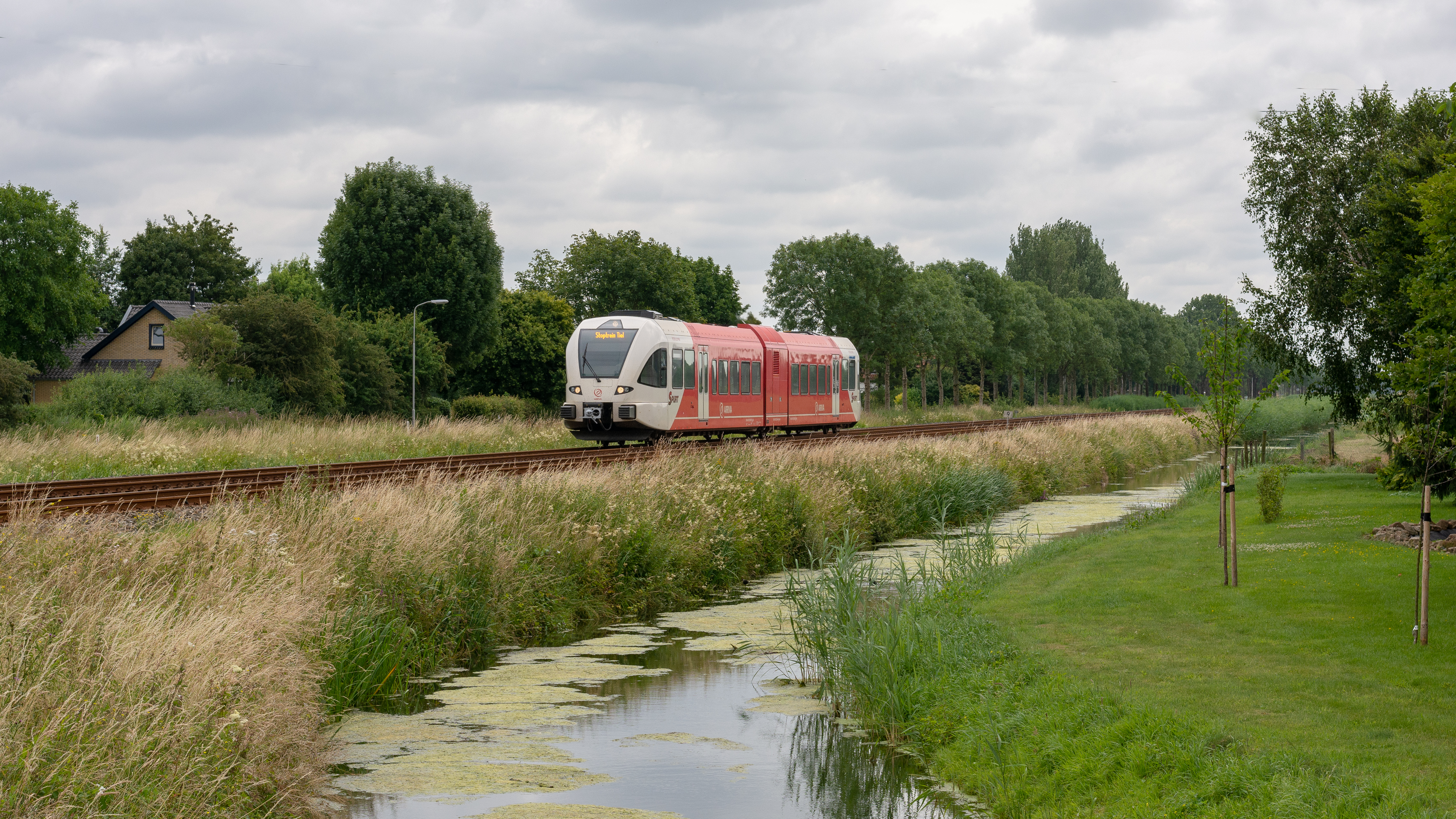
- Train near Overbetuwe

Overview
- Status: Operational
- Locale: Netherlands
- Termini: Elst railway station; Dordrecht railway station

Service
- Operator(s): Nederlandse Spoorwegen, Arriva, Qbuzz

History
- Opened: 1882 - 1885

Technical
- Line length: 92.8 km (57.7 mi)
- Number of tracks: Double track (Vork–Kesteren, Wadenoijen–Geldermalsen, Dordrecht Stadspolders–Dordrecht); Single track (Elst–Vork, Kesteren–Wadenoijen, Geldermalsen–Dordrecht Stadspolders)
- Track gauge: 1,435 mm (4 ft 8 1/2 in) standard gauge
- Electrification: 1.5 kV DC (Tiel–Dordrecht)

The Elst–Dordrecht railway is a railway line in the Netherlands running from Elst to Dordrecht, passing through Tiel, Geldermalsen and Gorinchem. It is also called the Betuwelijn (Batavia line). MerwedeLingelijn is the name of the western part between Dordrecht and Geldermalsen, which is operated by Qbuzz. Tiel - Elst as part of the service Tiel - Arnhem is operated by Arriva and Nederlandse Spoorwegen (NS) operates Geldermalsen - Tiel as part of the service Utrecht - Tiel. The railway connects to the Arnhem–Nijmegen railway in Elst. There were two connections to the Arnhem–Nijmegen railway in the past from the junction near Vork station; one to Elst and towards Nijmegen connecting near Ressen. The Nijmegen junction was used until 1990 and torn down during construction of the Betuweroute in order of creating a junction between the Betuweroute from Rotterdam and the Arnhem–Nijmegen railway towards both Arnhem and Nijmegen.

== Timeline ==
- 1 November 1882 - Railway line opens between Elst and Geldermalsen
- 1 December 1883 - Railway line opens between Geldermalsen and Gorinchem
- 16 July 1885 - Railway line opens between Gorinchem and Dordrecht
- 1916: Schaapsteeg stop closes
- 15 May 1927 - Giessen-Oudekerk station closes
- 15 May 1931 - Vork station closes
- 15 May 1938 - Arkel, Echteld, and Valburg stations close
- 10 June 1940 - Arkel station re-opens
- 1950: Wadenoijen station closes
- 2 June 1957 - Hardinxveld-Giessendam station opens
- 28 May 1978 - the section Geldermalsen - Tiel is electrified. As a result, diesel trains no longer service the complete Utrecht - Tiel - Arnhem/Nijmegen track, but as of then they only service Tiel to Arnhem/Nijmegen forcing passengers to change trains in Tiel.
- 31 May 1987 - Regular train services Tiel - Nijmegen cease. Only peak hour services remain. Passengers are forced to change trains in Elst.
- 27 May 1990 - Dordrecht Stadspolders station opens; the train service Tiel - Nijmegen ceases completely.
- 31 May 1992 - the section Dordrecht - Geldermalsen is electrified
- 1 April 2005 - Syntus wins contract to operate the service Tiel - Elst (- Arnhem) when NS stopped servicing this track.
- 10 December 2006 - Arriva wins contract to operate the service Dordrecht - Geldermalsen ending the former NS services. Arriva operates a half-hourly service 7 days a week, starting earlier and finishing later. Passengers are offered improved better train changes at Dordrecht for Rotterdam, The Hague, and Amsterdam and at Geldermalsen for Utrecht
- 14 September 2008 - New Spurt material is put into service by Arriva.
- 11 December 2011 - Sliedrecht Baanhoek and Hardinxveld Blauwe Zoom stations open
- 16 April 2012 - Boven-Hardinxveld station opens
- 9 December 2012 - Arriva wins contract to operate the service Tiel - Elst - Arnhem ending the Syntus services
- 2018 - Qbuzz is awarded an 8-year concession to operare the service Dordrecht - Geldermalsen, thus ending the Arriva services.

== Train services ==
- 2 hourly local services (stoptrein) Dordrecht - Gorinchem - Geldermalsen (Qbuzz)
- 2 hourly local services (stoptrein) Dordrecht - Gorinchem (Qbuzz)
- 2 hourly local services (Sprinter) Utrecht - Geldermalsen - Tiel between Geldermalsen and Tiel (NS)
- 1 hourly local service (stoptrein) Tiel - Elst - Arnhem between Elst and Tiel (Arriva)
