= Qbuzz =

Dutch public transport bus company

- Industry: Public transport
- Founded: April 2008
- Founder: Rob van Holten; Leon Struijk
- Headquarters: Amersfoort, Netherlands
- Revenue: €213 million (2016)
- Net income: €9 million (2016)
- Owner: Ferrovie dello Stato Italiane
- Number of employees: 2,100 (2017)
- Website: www.qbuzz.nl

Qbuzz is a public transport company in the Netherlands that operates services in Friesland, South Holland, Drenthe and Groningen. Founded in 2008, it was a subsidiary of Nederlandse Spoorwegen from 2013 until 2017. It is currently owned by Ferrovie dello Stato Italiane.

== History ==
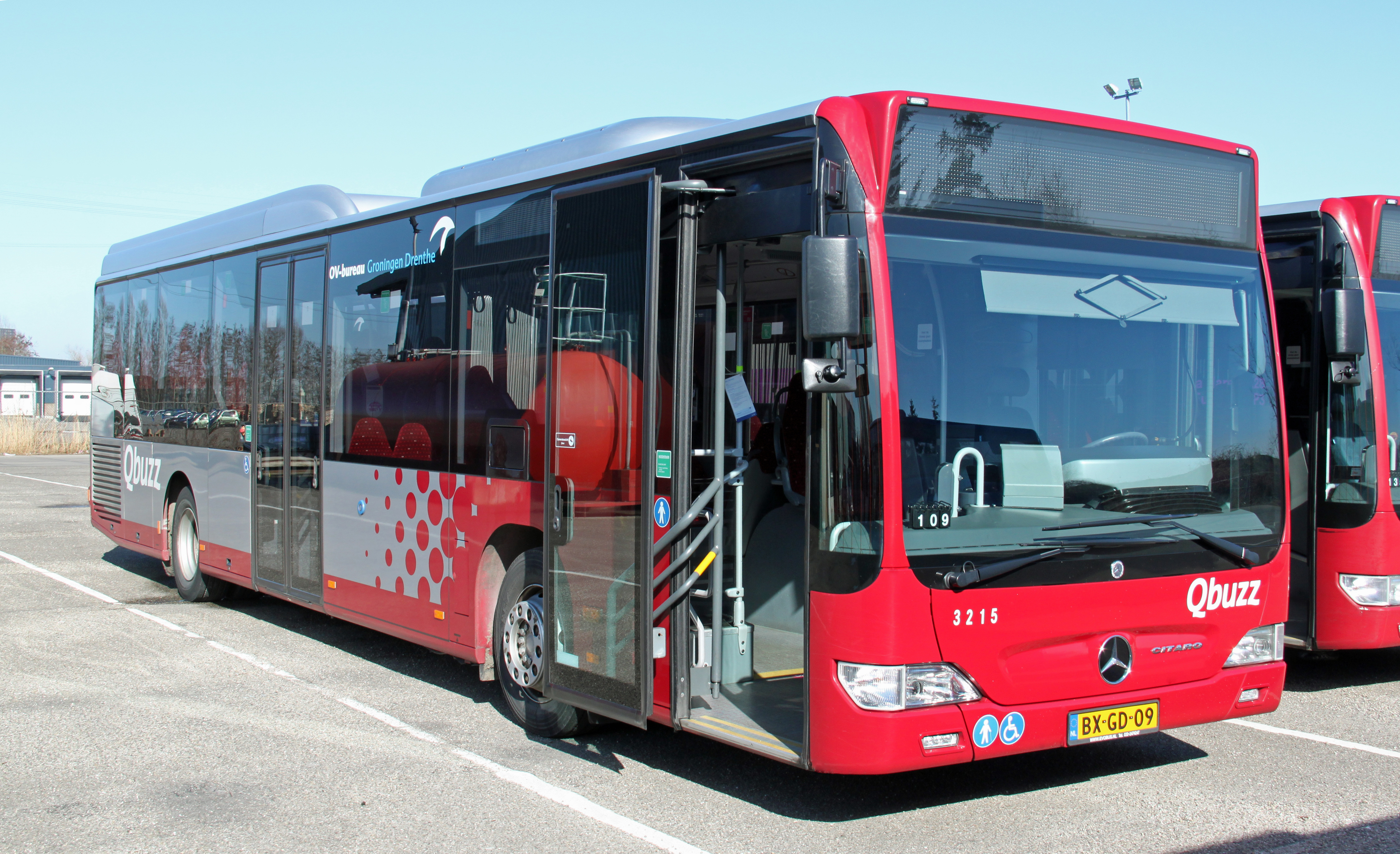
Mercedes-Benz Citaro in Groningen in April 2014

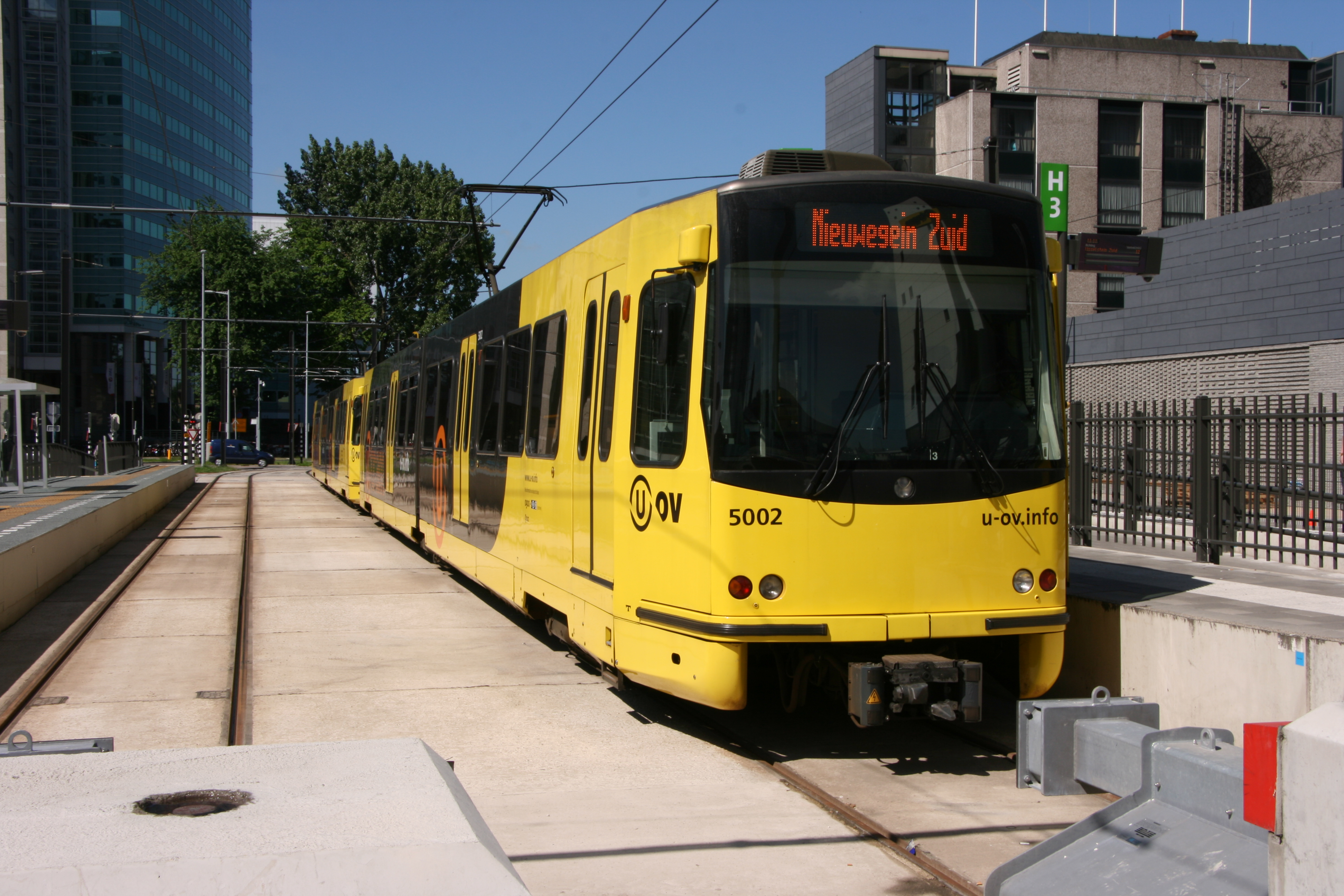
Sneltram at Utrecht Centraal station in June 2014

Qbuzz was founded in 2008 by former Connexxion directors Rob van Holten and Leon Struijk. Having initially had a 49% shareholding, Nederlandse Spoorwegen purchased the remaining 51% in April 2013.

In March 2015, Qbuzz was awarded a 15-year concession to operate services in the Limburg region from December 2016. However, after the discovery of irregularities during the tender process, the contract was awarded to Arriva.

In July 2016, Nederlandse Spoorwegen announced its intention to sell the business. In July 2017 Busitalia Sita Nord (subsidiary of Ferrovie dello Stato Italiane) purchased the company.

== Operations ==
In December 2008, Qbuzz started operating bus services in Friesland and Rotterdam. Upon being re-tendered, the Friesland services passed to Arriva in December 2016.

In December 2009, Qbuzz won the concession to operate bus services in Groningen and Drenthe until December 2019. In December 2011, Qbuzz began operating the bus and sneltram services in Utrecht trading as U-OV until December 2023.

In January 2018 Qbuzz was selected by the province of South Holland as preferred bidder for a contract which combines the operation of MerwedeLingelijn train service on the Geldermalsen – Dordrecht route with the provision of local bus services. On 9 December 2018, Qbuzz officially took over services from Arriva on the MerwedeLingeLijn.

In June 2023 Qbuzz announced its plans for an international service to Paris and Berlin.

== Fleet ==
As at March 2016, Qbuzz operated 686 buses and 27 trams.
