= Breda-Prinsenbeek railway station =

Railway station in the Netherlands

Breda-Prinsenbeek
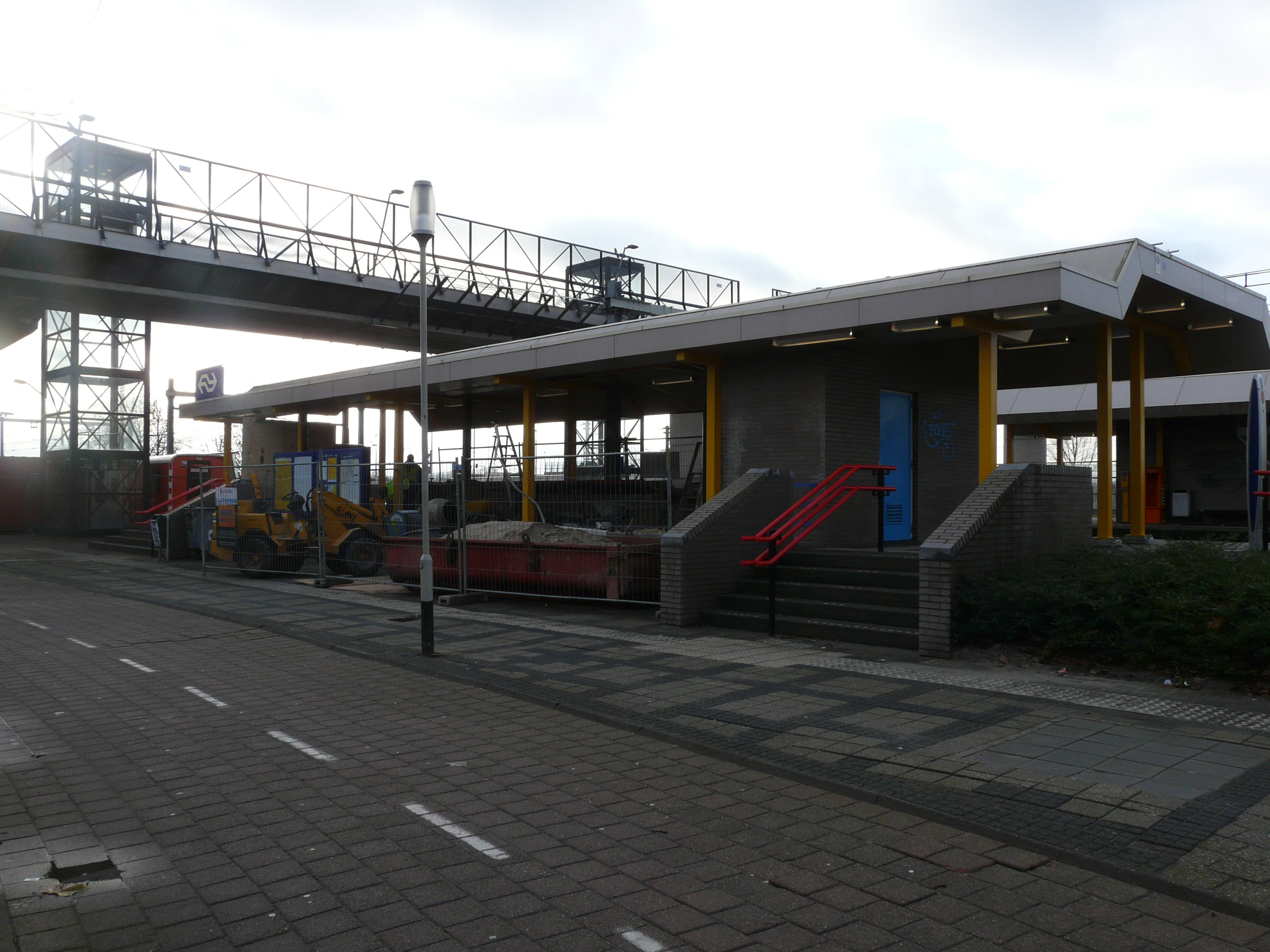

General information
- Location: Netherlands
- Coordinates: 51°36′19″N 4°43′18″E
- Line: Breda–Rotterdam railway

History
- Opened: 1988

Services
Preceding station	Nederlandse Spoorwegen	Following station
Lage Zwaluwe towards Dordrecht	NS Sprinter 6600 Mon-Sat until 19:00	Breda towards Arnhem Centraal
Lage Zwaluwe towards Dordrecht	NS Sprinter 6600 After 19:00 and Sun	Breda towards Nijmegen
Location
- Location within Netherlands

Breda-Prinsenbeek is a railway station in the city of Breda. It is located on the Breda–Rotterdam railway, parallel to the A16 motorway.

The station serves the village of Prinsenbeek and the Breda city district Haagse Beemden, as well as a small nearby business area which includes the headquarters of the Royal Netherlands Air Force. The NAC Breda, Rat Verlegh (football) Stadion is just several bus stops away by the nr. 2 bus line. There are no shops or food & drinks facilities at the station. The station was opened in 1988 and is currently operated by Nederlandse Spoorwegen.

== Accessibility ==
The station has two entrances. The main entrance is located at the ‘Westerhagenlaan’. An alternative entrance via the ‘Beekse Stationsweg’ enters at platform 2. Both platforms are connected by a bridge and accessible by stairs and elevator. Pedestrians can easily reach both entrances of the station from the Haagse Beemden and Prinsenbeek. Up and down the direction of Prinsenbeek a pedestrian and cycle bridge crosses the HSL-Zuid and A16 motorway.

=== P+R Transferium Prinsenbeek ===
Bicycles can be parked in open bicycle stands or lockers at both sides of the bridge and the Beekse Stationsweg parking lot.
At the main entrance is a small number of car parking places. A lager free parking lot can be found at the Beekse Stationsweg.

== Destinations ==
=== Train services ===
The following services currently call at Breda-Prinsenbeek:

- 2x per hour a regional service ‘Sprinter’ northbound to Lage Zwaluwe, Dordrecht-Zuid and Dordrecht (1x per hour during evenings and weekends).
- 2x per hour a Sprinter-train service to Breda, Gilze-Rijen, Tilburg-Reeshof, Tilburg-Universiteit, Tilburg with the final station at Arnhem Centraal.

For more major destinations by train, it is best to travel to the Breda railway station. From there intercity’s run to destinations as; Roosendaal, Rotterdam, The Hague, Schiphol Airport, Amsterdam Centraal station, Tilburg, Eindhoven, 's-Hertogenbosch (Den Bosch), Zwolle, Antwerp and Brussels-Midi (South) and a Sprinter to Etten-Leur.

=== Buses ===
Local

The station can be reached by citybus from Breda bus station with buses 2 and 4 in the direction of Haagse Beemden. These stop at the 'Westerhagelaan NS' bus stop in front of the station. Across the A16 motorway, the regional bus nr. 216 to Etten-Leur stops at the bottom of the bridge at the ‘Velsgoed’ bus stop and the nr. 119 line to Zevenbergen at the ‘Heikantsestraat’ bus stop in Prinsenbeek.

International

Next to the train station is the international bus stop. This bus stop is mainly used for non-regular coach services and charters. Also the Flixbus company operates the 813 bus line from Amsterdam to Antwerp and Brussels-North passing on Fridays, Saturdays and Sundays. At the international bus stop is an all-gender and disable toilet.

The ‘Bastion Hotel Breda’ is located across the street where the international busses stop.

For more international destinations by regular bus schedules, it is best to travel to the Breda international bus stop at the Breda railway station.

== OV Fiets ==
At the station travelers can pick up a ’OV rental bicycle’ from one of the lockers at the main entrance. This bicycle rental goes by a smartphone application.

Due to the vast bicycle path network, cyclists can go in various directions throughout the city or region.

== Scooter-sharing ==
It is not uncommon to find several scootersharing, electric scooters at either side of the bridge or within walking distance in Prinsenbeek or the Haagse Beemden. In Breda the ‘GO Sharing’, ‘Check’ and ‘Felyx’ companies are active offering these sharing system.
