= Belcrum =

Coordinates: 51°35′53″N 4°46′33″E

- Neighborhood
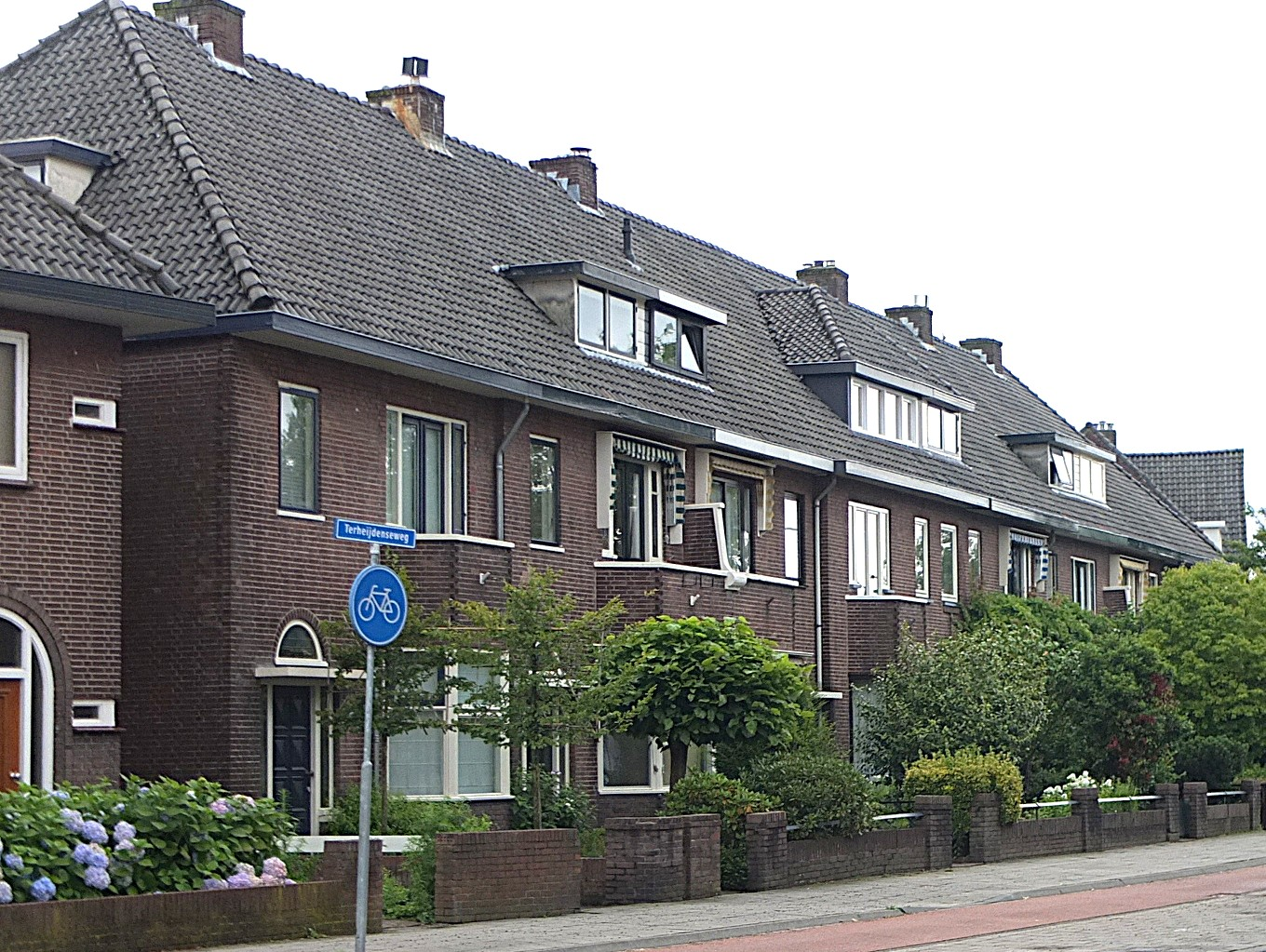
- The Terheijdenseweg in Belcrum

- Belcrum within Breda in red
- Country: Netherlands
- Province: North Brabant
- Municipality: Breda
- City: Breda

Area
  - Total: 0.53 km^{2} (0.20 sq mi)
  - Land: 0.53 km^{2} (0.20 sq mi)

Population (2025)
  - Total: 4,490
  - Density: 8,500/km^{2} (22,000/sq mi)
- Time zone: UTC+1 (Central European Time)
  - Summer (DST): UTC+2 (Central European Summer Time)
- Postal code: 4815
- Area codes: 076

Belcrum is a neighbourhood in the city Breda. Belcrum has 4,490 residents.

== History ==
The name Belcrum first got mentioned in 1377. The earliest version of the name Belcrum is Belckenem. In the Middle Ages, there likely was a settlement in Belcrum.

In 1612, a park-like forest was made north of the Breda Castle at the Speelhuislaan called Speelhuis by Philip William, Prince of Orange, the oldest son of William the Silent. After he died, Maurice, Prince of Orange; his brother, got it.

In 1824, Speelhuis got sold and destroyed.

Between 1795 and 1927, Belcrum was part of the municipality of Teteringen. After 1927 it was bought by Breda and built in the 30s-50s.

== Demographics ==
As demonstrated in the table below, the biggest age group of Belcrum are young-aged adults (aged 25–45).

Age distribution in Belcrum
Age group	Population	Percentage
0-15	675	15.1%
15-25	625	13.9%
25-45	1710	38.1%
45-65	965	21.5%
65+	510	11.4%

77% of residents are Dutch. 9.7% are from Europe and 13.3% are from outside of Europe.

== Education ==
There is 1 elementary school; KBS De Spoorzoeker.

== Transportation ==
Bus 3 goes from Haagse Beemden to Nieuw Wolfslaar, the route follows:

Haagse Beemden - Kesteren - Gageldonk - Belcrum - Breda railway station - Breda Centrum - Amphia - IJpelaar - Nieuw Wolfslaar
