= Breda railway station =

Railway station in Netherlands

Breda
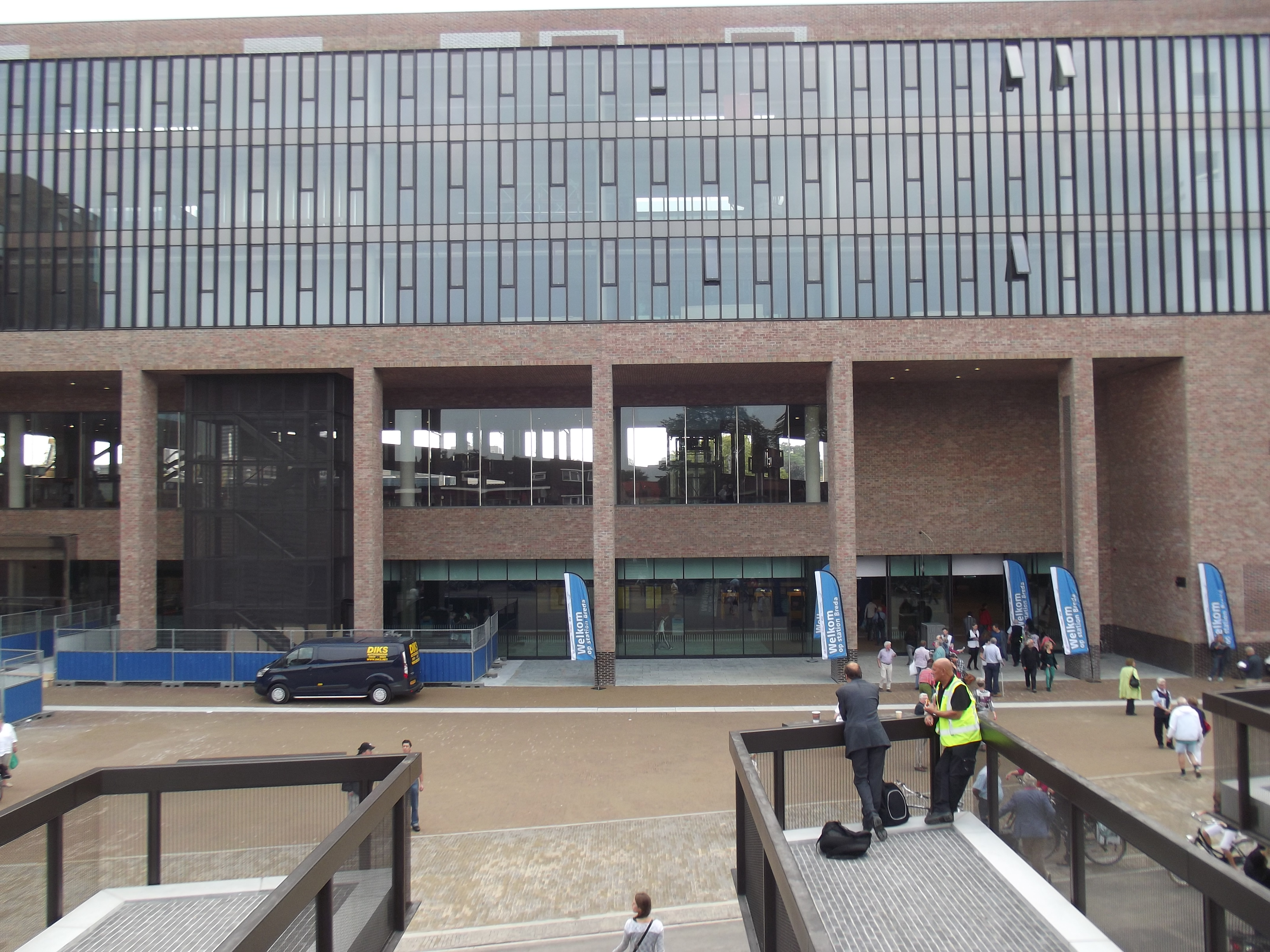

General information
- Location: Breda, North Brabant, Netherlands
- Coordinates: 51°35′42″N 4°46′48″E
- Lines: Breda–Rotterdam railway Roosendaal–Breda railway Breda–Eindhoven railway
- Platforms: 7
- Connections: Arriva: 1, 2, 3, 4, 5, 6, 7, 8, 9, 11, 12, 16, 115, 117, 119, 122, 123, 131, 132, 145, 311, 312, 316, 325, 326, 327, 401, 402, 617, 618; Connexxion: 19

Other information
- Station code: Bd

History
- Opened: 1 May 1855

Services
Preceding station	NS International	Following station
Rotterdam Centraal Terminus	Eurocity 9200	Reverses direction
Noorderkempen towards Brussels-South	Eurocity 9200	Reverses direction
Preceding station	Nederlandse Spoorwegen	Following station
Rotterdam Centraal towards Den Haag Centraal	NS Intercity 1100	Tilburg towards Eindhoven Centraal
Rotterdam Centraal towards Amersfoort Schothorst	NS Intercity Direct 1800	Terminus
Etten-Leur towards Roosendaal	NS Intercity 3600	Tilburg towards Zwolle
Dordrecht towards Rotterdam Centraal	NS Nachtnet 21410 Fri/Sat night only	Tilburg towards Eindhoven Centraal
Breda-Prinsenbeek towards Dordrecht	NS Sprinter 6600 Mon-Sat until 19:00	Gilze-Rijen towards Arnhem Centraal
Breda-Prinsenbeek towards Dordrecht	NS Sprinter 6600 After 19:00 and Sun	Gilze-Rijen towards Nijmegen
Location
- Location within Netherlands

Breda railway station is a railway station in Breda in North Brabant, Netherlands. It is situated on the Breda–Rotterdam railway, the Roosendaal–Breda railway and the Breda–Eindhoven railway.

== History ==
The first station was opened on 1 May 1855 as the eastern terminus of the Roosendaal–Breda railway. When the line was extended to Tilburg, a new station was built on the same site in 1863. The station was initially run solely by a Belgian company, the Société Anonyme des chemins de fer d'Anvers à Rotterdam until the opening of the line to Tilburg from Staatsspoorwegen (Dutch State Railways), which changed after the merger between that company with the HSM in 1938 to Nederlandse Spoorwegen. In the 1970s, the station was rebuilt in combination with being placed on a viaduct. This station was opened on 10 October 1975 and designed by architect Hans (J.) Bak. The station was recognisable by its design with a large canopy over the two platforms with four tracks. The regional bus station next to the station had the same canopy type.

From 4 April 2011 the high-speed train Fyra from Amsterdam Centraal stops in Breda. This service was renamed in December 2013 to Intercity Direct because of the earlier problems with the V250 rolling stock.

On 30 May 2012 the Minister of Infrastructure Melanie Schultz van Haegen officially launched the project Via Breda, which includes another total reconstruction of the station. On 6 September 2014 at 05:30 (AM), a new pedestrian tunnel was opened alongside the northern part of the station building. The old southern station building will be demolished, as well as the regional and city bus stations. The buses were replaced to the northern side on new elevated bus platforms when the old southern part of the station was closed in the night of 6-7 September after the last night train departed. The project is expected to be completed in 2016, when the southern part of the new station will be opened.

== Destinations ==
The following major destinations are directly connected from Breda railway station:

Dordrecht, Rotterdam Centraal, Delft, Den Haag HS, Den Haag Centraal, Utrecht, Amsterdam, Schiphol, Tilburg, 's-Hertogenbosch, Oss, Nijmegen, Arnhem, Deventer, Zwolle, Eindhoven, Helmond, Venlo and Roosendaal.

== Train services ==
The following services start at Breda:

- 2× per hour high speed services (Intercity Direct) Amsterdam – Schiphol – Rotterdam – Breda
- 2× per hour intercity services The Hague – Rotterdam – Breda – Tilburg – Eindhoven (Suspended on section Breda-Eindhoven until April 2017 due to a shortage of trains that are allowed on the HSL-Zuid, which is used between Rotterdam and Breda by this service)
- 1× per hour intercity service Dordrecht – Breda (Not on evenings and weekends)
- 2× per hour intercity services Zwolle – Deventer – Zutphen – Arnhem – Nijmegen – 's-Hertogenbosch – Tilburg – Breda – Roosendaal
- 2× per hour intercity services Breda – Tilburg – Eindhoven (Temporarily replacement services for intercity services between The Hague and Eindhoven which are suspended between Breda and Eindhoven until April 2017)
- 1× per hour night train (nachtnet) service Rotterdam – Breda – Eindhoven (weekends only)
- 2× per hour local services (sprinter) Dordrecht – Breda – Tilburg – 's-Hertogenbosch

In the new 2015 railway timetable, which will be implemented on 14 December 2014, the off-peak frequency of the sprinter between Breda and The Hague will be increased to 2× per hour, creating a 2× per hour service on weekdays until 20:00 (8pm).

== Bus services ==
The station is served by city bus services (stadsbussen) as well as several regional bus services (streekbussen)

=== Stadsbussen ===
There are 9 city bus lines. All lines are operated by Arriva. From the railway station the city bus lines provides services to/from:

- Centrum (downtown area)
- Amphia Ziekenhuis Langendijk (Hospital)
- Amphia Ziekenhuis Molengracht (Hospital)
- Rat Verlegh Stadion (Stadium of soccer team NAC)
- Prinsenbeek railway station
- The neighbourhoods Brabantpark, Belcrum, Blauwe Kei, Boeimeer, Ginneken, Haagse Beemden, Heusdenhout, Heuvel, Hoge Vucht, Ijpelaar, Nieuw Wolfslaar, Princenhage, Sportpark, Tuinzigt, Westerpark and Zandberg
- The industrial area Krogten
- The neighbouring town of Bavel

Several neighbourhoods are also served by regional bus services (see also: Streekbussen)

The routes of the city buses are as follows:

Line	Route	Frequency	Notes
1	Heerbaan – Heusdenhout – Brabantpark – Centraal Station – Centrum – Tuinzigt – Westerpark	2×/hour	Arrives/Continues as line 7 at Heerbaan; At evenings, Saturday mornings and Sundays buses FROM Heerbaan TO Centraal Station continue as line 7 to Centrum and Ginneken at Centraal Station; At weekdays evenings until 8:00 pm, Saturday mornings, Saturday evenings until 8:00 pm and Sundays until 7:00 pm buses FROM Centraal Station TO Westerpark arrive as line 7 from Heerbaan, Heusdenhout and Brabantpark at Centraal Station; At weekdays evenings after 8:00 pm, Saturday evenings after 8:00 pm and Sunday evenings after 7:00 pm buses on section Heerbaan-Centraal Station operate only in one direction: From Heerbaan to Centraal Station; The section Centraal Station-Westerpark is not served on weekdays evenings after 8:00pm, Saturday evenings after 8:00pm and Sunday evenings after 7:00pm
2	Centraal Station – Centrum – Rat Verlegh Stadion (Stadion NAC) – Haagse Beemden Zuid – Haagse Beemden West – Station Prinsenbeek – Haagse Beemden Noord – Overkroetenlaan – Heksenwiellaan	Outside holidays: 4×/hour, but only 2×/hour on evenings, Saturday mornings and Sundays; Holidays: 2×/hour, but 4×/hour on Saturday afternoons	Arrives/Continues as line 6/12 at Heksenwiellaan
4	Hoge Vucht – Centraal Station – Centrum – Boeimeer – Amphia Ziekenhuis Langendijk – Heuvel – Princenhage – Woonboulevard	Outside holidays: 4×/hour, but only 2×/hour Hoge Vucht-Centraal Station on early evenings, Saturday mornings and Sundays and only 2×/hour on the whole route on late evenings; Holidays: 4×/hour, but only 2×/hour Hoge Vucht-Centraal Station on weekdays, Saturday mornings, early Saturday evenings and Sundays and only 2×/hour on the whole route on late evenings	Same route in Hoge Vucht as line 5, but in the opposite direction; On early evenings, Saturday mornings, Sundays and weekdays during holidays the buses to/from Woonboulevard and Princenhage who do not operate on section Hoge Vucht-Centraal Station arrive/continue as line 5 to/from Hoge Vucht; At late evenings buses coming FROM Hoge Vucht end at Centraal Station and buses FROM Centraal Station TO Woonboulevard arrive as line 5 from Hoge Vucht at Centraal Station
5	Hoge Vucht – Centraal Station – Centrum – Boeimeer – Amphia Ziekenhuis Langendijk – Heuvelplein – Princenhage	Outside holidays: 4×/hour, but only 2×/hour on evenings, Saturday mornings and Sundays; Holidays: 2×/hour, but 4×/hour on Saturday afternoons	Same route in Hoge Vucht as line 4, but in the opposite direction; On early evenings, Saturday mornings, Sundays and weekdays during holidays buses do not run on section Centraal Station-Princenhage. Buses to/from Hoge Vucht arrive/continue as line 4 to/from Centrum, Amphia Ziekenhuis Langendijk, Princenhage and Woonboulevard at Centraal Station; On late evenings buses TO Hoge Vucht start at Centraal Station and buses FROM Hoge Vucht TO Centraal Station continue as line 4 to/from Centrum, Amphia Ziekenhuis Langendijk, Princenhage and Woonboulevard at Centraal Station
6	Heksenwiellaan – Haagse Beemden Noord – Haagse Beemden Oost – Krogten – Belcrum West – Centraal Station – Centrum – Sportpark – Zandberg – Blauwe Kei West – IJpelaar West – Nieuw Wolfslaar – Nieuw Wolfslaarlaan	2×/hour	Arrives/Continues as line 2 at Heksenwiellaan; Arrives/Continues as line 12 at Nieuw Wolfslaarlaan; On evenings, Saturday mornings, Sundays and weekdays during holidays buses do not run on section Heksenwiellaan-Centraal Station
7	Heerbaan – Heusdenhout – Brabantpark – Centraal Station – Centrum – Ginneken	2×/hour	Arrives/Continues as line 1 at Heerbaan; At weekdays evenings until 8:00 pm, Saturday mornings, Saturday evenings until 8:00 pm and Sundays until 7:00 pm buses FROM Heerbaan TO Centraal Station continue as line 1 to Centrum, Tuinzigt and Westerpark at Centraal Station; At evenings, Saturday mornings and Sundays buses FROM Centraal Station TO Ginneken arrive as line 1 from Heerbaan, Heusdenhout and Brabantpark at Centraal Station; At weekdays evenings after 8:00 pm, Saturday evenings after 8:00 pm and Sunday evenings after 7:00 pm buses on section Heerbaan-Centraal Station operate only in one direction: From Centraal Station to Heerbaan
11	Centraal Station – Centrum – Amphia Ziekenhuis Molengracht – Bijster – Bavel	Outside holidays: 2×/hour, but only 1×/hour at evenings and weekends; Holidays: 1×/hour, but 2×/hour during weekdays rush hours	At weekdays morning rush hours outside holidays there are two extra services on section Centraal Station-Bijster
12	Heksenwiellaan – Haagse Beemden Noord – Haagse Beemden Oost – Krogten – Belcrum West – Centraal Station – Centrum – Amphia Ziekenhuis Molengracht – Blauwe Kei Oost – IJpelaar Oost – Nieuw Wolfslaar – Nieuw Wolfslaarlaan	2×/hour	Arrives/Continues as line 2 at Heksenwiellaan; Arrives/Continues as line 6 at Nieuw Wolfslaarlaan

=== Streekbussen ===
Several regional bus lines serve the station. Two of them are also international services to the Dutch town of Hulst via Antwerp in Belgium. (Line 19) and to the village of Meersel-Dreef, also in Belgium. (Line 145) The regional bus lines are operated by Arriva and Connexxion

The routes of the regional buses, serving Breda, Centraal Station are as follows:

Line	Operator	Route	Frequency	Notes
19	Connexxion	Breda, Centraal Station – Breda, Centrum – Antwerp (Belgium), Halewijnlaan Metro station – Antwerp (Belgium) – Nieuw-Namen – Clinge – Hulst	Outside holidays: 1×/2 hours, but 1×/hour FROM Breda TO Hulst between 9:30am and 11:30am on Mondays, between 3:30pm and 5:30pm on all weekdays, except Fridays and between 5:00pm and 11:00pm on Sundays and FROM Hulst TO Breda between 7:00am and 9:00am on Mondays, between 1:00pm and 3:00pm on all weekdays, except Fridays and between 3:00pm and 9:00pm at Sundays and 2×/hour IN BOTH DIRECTIONS on Friday afternoons; All holidays, except Summer holidays: 1×/2 hours, but 1×/hour FROM Breda TO Hulst between 9:30am and 11:30am on Mondays and between 3:30pm and 5:30pm on all weekdays, except Fridays and FROM Hulst TO Breda between 7:00am and 9:00am on Mondays and between 1:00pm and 3:00pm on all weekdays, except Fridays and 2×/hour IN BOTH DIRECTIONS on Friday afternoons; Summer holidays: 1×/2 hours, but 1×/hour FROM Breda TO Hulst between 9:30am and 11:30am on Mondays and between 3:30pm and 5:30pm on all weekdays and FROM Hulst TO Breda between 7:00am and 9:00am on Mondays and between 1:00pm and 3:00pm on all weekdays	Does not run on evenings, except Sunday evenings outside holidays
115	Arriva	Breda, Centraal Station – Breda, Centrum – Breda, Heuvelplein – Effen – Rijsbergen – Zundert – Zundert, Oranjeplein – Zundert, Berkenring/Wernhout	Outside holidays: Breda-Zundert, Oranjeplein: 2×/hour, but 4×/hour on weekdays rush hours and only 1×/hour on evenings and Sundays, Zundert, Oranjeplein-Zundert, Berkenring: 1×/hour, but 3×/hour on weekdays rush hours and Zundert, Oranjeplein-Wernhout: 1×/hour; Holidays: Breda-Zundert, Oranjeplein: 2×/hour, but only 1×/hour on evenings and Sundays, Zundert, Oranjeplein-Zundert, Berkenring: 1×/hour and Zundert, Oranjeplein-Wernhout: 1×/hour, but only on weekdays rush hours, evenings and weekends	On evenings and Sundays buses coming FROM Breda always directly continue to Wernhout from Zundert, Oranjeplein. After turning in Wernhout to go back TO Breda buses follow an alternative route VIA Zundert, Berkenring to Zundert, Oranjeplein and then continue back on the normal route to Breda; The section Zundert, Oranjeplein-Wernhout is not served on weekdays outside rush hours during holidays, except evenings
117	Arriva	Breda, Centraal Station – Breda, Belcrum Oost – Breda, Krogten – Teteringen – Wagenberg – Langeweg – Station Zevenbergen – Zevenbergen – Zevenbergen, De Meeren – Klundert – Fijnaart	Outside holidays: 2×/hour, but only 1×/hour on evenings and weekends; Holidays: 1×/hour, but 2×/hour during weekdays rush hours	On weekdays morning rush hours outside holidays two buses start at Willemstad and follow a route via Oude Molen to Fijnaart and continue there on the normal route to Breda; On evenings and weekends the section Klundert-Fijnaart is not served; The sections Breda, Centraal Station->Station Zevenbergen and Zevenbergen, De Meeren->Breda, Centraal Station are not served on evenings and Sundays. Buses TO Klundert arrive as line 119 from Breda, Prinsenbeek and Zwartenberg at Station Zevenbergen. Buses FROM Klundert continue as line 119 to Zevenbergen, Station Zevenbergen, Zwartenberg, Prinsenbeek and Breda at Zevenbergen, De Meeren
119	Arriva	Breda, Centraal Station -> Breda, Centrum -> Breda, Woonboulevard -> Prinsenbeek -> Zwartenberg -> Station Zevenbergen -> Zevenbergen, De Meeren -> Zevenbergen -> Station Zevenbergen -> Zwartenberg -> Prinsenbeek -> Breda, Woonboulevard -> Breda, Centrum -> Breda, Centraal Station	Outside holidays: 2×/hour, but only 1×/hour on evenings and weekends; Holidays: 1×/hour, but 2×/hour during weekdays rush hours	The section Station Zevenbergen->Zevenbergen, De Meeren->Zevenbergen->Station Zevenbergen is not wholly served on evenings and Sundays. Buses FROM Breda continue as line 117 to Zevenbergen, Zevenbergen, De Meeren and Klundert at Station Zevenbergen. Buses TO Breda arrive as line 117 from Klundert at Zevenbergen, De Meeren
122	Arriva	Breda, Centraal Station – Breda, Belcrum Oost – Breda, Krogten – Terheijden – Wagenberg – Wagenberg, Kruispunt – Hooge Zwaluwe – Lage Zwaluwe – Station Lage Zwaluwe	Outside holidays: 1×/hour, but 2×/hour during weekdays rush hours; Holidays: 1×/hour	Not on evenings and Sundays; The section Breda, Centraal Station-Wagenberg, Kruispunt is not served on Saturdays
123	Arriva	Breda, Centraal Station – Breda, Belcrum Oost – Breda, Krogten – Wagenberg, Kruispunt – Made – Made, Gemeentehuis – Geertruidenberg – Raamsdonksveer	Outside holidays: 2×/hour, but only 1×/hour on evenings and weekends; Holidays: 1×/hour, but 2×/hour during weekdays rush hours	On evenings and weekends buses run via Terheijden and Wagenberg on section Breda, Krogten-Wagenberg, Kruispunt; On Sundays buses do not run on section Made, Gemeentehuis-Raamsdonksveer
131	Arriva	Breda, Centraal Station – Breda, Centrum – Breda, Amphia Ziekenhuis Molengracht – Breda, Bijster – Dorst – Rijen, Gemeentehuis – Rijen – Station Gilze-Rijen – Hulten – Gilze – Tilburg – Station Tilburg	Outside holidays: 2×/hour, but only 1×/hour on evenings; Holidays: 1×/hour, but 2×/hour during weekdays rush hours	Not on weekends; At weekdays evenings buses do not run on section Breda, Centraal Station-Rijen, Gemeentehuis
132	Arriva	Breda, Centraal Station – Breda, Centrum – Breda, Sportpark – Breda, Zandberg – Breda, Blauwe Kei West – Ulvenhout – Chaam – Chaam, Dorpsstraat – Gaarshof/Ulicoten – Baarle-Nassau, Hoogbraak – Baarle-Nassau – Alphen – Rechte Heide – Riel – Goirle – Tilburg – Station Tilburg	Outside holidays: Breda, Centraal Station-Chaam, Dorpsstraat and Baarle-Nassau, Hoogbraak-Station Tilburg: 2×/hour, but only 1×/hour Baarle-Nassau, Hoogbraak-Station Tilburg between 9:00am and 1:00pm and only 1×/hour on both sections on evenings and weekends, Chaam, Dorpsstraat-Gaarshof-Baarle Nassau, Hoogbraak and Chaam, Dorpsstraat-Ulicoten-Baarle-Nassau, Hoogbraak: 1×/hour, but only 1×/2 hours on evenings and weekends; Holidays: Breda, Centraal Station-Chaam, Dorpsstraat and Baarle-Nassau, Hoogbraak-Station Tilburg: 1×/hour, but 2×/hour during weekdays rush hours, Chaam, Dorpsstraat-Gaarshof-Baarle Nassau, Hoogbraak and Chaam, Dorpsstraat-Ulicoten-Baarle-Nassau, Hoogbraak: 1×/2 hours, but 1×/hour during weekdays rush hours	The sections Chaam, Dorpsstraat-Gaarshof-Baarle Nassau, Hoogbraak and Chaam, Dorpsstraat-Ulicoten-Baarle-Nassau, Hoogbraak are alternately served
145	Arriva	Breda, Centraal Station – Breda, Centrum – Breda, Boeimeer – Breda, Ruitersbos – Galder – Meersel-Dreef (Belgium)	1×/hour	Not on evenings and weekends
311	Arriva	Breda, Centraal Station – Breda, Centrum – Breda, Woonboulevard – Liesbos – Etten-Leur – Etten-Leur, Centrum – Station Etten-Leur – Hoeven – Oudenbosch – Station Oudenbosch – Oud Gastel	2×/hour, but only 1×/hour on evenings and weekends	Volans; At weekdays morning rush hours outside holidays there are extra buses running FROM Oud Gastel and Oudenbosch TO Breda; At weekdays evening rush hours outside holidays there are extra buses running FROM Breda TO Oudenbosch
312	Arriva	Breda, Centraal Station – Breda, Centrum – Breda, Woonboulevard – Liesbos – Etten-Leur – Etten-Leur, Centrum – Sint Willebrord – Sprundel – Rucphen – Roosendaal – Station Roosendaal – Roosendaal, Roselaar busstation	2×/hour, but only 1×/hour Etten Leur, Centrum-Roosendaal, Roselaar busstation outside weekdays rush hours and only 1×/hour on the whole route on evenings and weekends	Volans; The sections Breda, Centraal Station-Etten Leur, Centrum and Station Roosendaal-Roosendaal, Roselaar busstation are not served at evenings and Sundays. Buses TO Roosendaal arrive as line 316 from Breda, Liesbos, Etten-Leur and Station Etten-Leur at Etten-Leur, Centrum. Buses FROM Roosendaal continue as line 316 to Station Etten-Leur, Etten-Leur, Liesbos and Breda
316	Arriva	Breda, Centraal Station – Breda, Centrum – Breda, Woonboulevard – Liesbos – Etten-Leur – Station Etten-Leur – Etten-Leur, Centrum	2×/hour, but only 1×/hour on evenings and Sundays	Volans; At evenings and Sundays buses TO Breda arrive as line 312 from Station Roosendaal, Roosendaal, Rucphen, Sprundel and Sint Willebrord at Etten-Leur, Centrum and Buses FROM Breda continue as line 312 to Sint Willebrord, Sprundel, Rucphen, Roosendaal and Station Roosendaal at Etten-Leur, Centrum
325	Arriva	Breda, Bijster – Breda, Amphia Ziekenhuis Molengracht – Breda, Centrum – Breda, Centraal Station – Teteringen – Oosterhout, Busstation – Oosterhout, Amphia Ziekenhuis Pasteurlaan – Oosterhout	2×/hour, but only 1×/hour on evenings and Sundays	Volans
326	Arriva	Breda, Bijster – Breda, Amphia Ziekenhuis Molengracht – Breda, Centrum – Breda, Centraal Station – Teteringen – Oosterhout, Busstation – Oosterhout, Amphia Ziekenhuis Pasteurlaan – Oosterhout – Raamsdonksveer – Geertruidenberg	2×/hour, but only 1×/hour on evenings and Sundays	Volans
327	Arriva	Breda, Bijster – Breda, Amphia Ziekenhuis Molengracht – Breda, Centrum – Breda, Centraal Station – Teteringen – Oosterhout, Busstation – Oosterhout – Oosteind – Dongen – Tilburg – Station Tilburg	Outside holidays: 2×/hour, but 4×/hour Oosterhout, Busstation-Station Tilburg on weekdays, except evenings and only 1×/hour Breda, Centraal Station-Oosterhout, Busstation on evenings and Sundays; Holidays: 2×/hour, only 1×/hour Breda, Centraal Station-Oosterhout, Busstation on evenings and Sundays	Volans
401	Arriva	Breda, Centraal Station – Breda, Centrum – Breda, Bijster – Hank – Nieuwendijk – Sleeuwijk – Vianen – Utrecht – Station Utrecht Centraal Jaarbeurszijde	2×/hour, but only 1×/hour at evenings and Saturdays and only 1×/2 hours at Sundays, except Sunday evenings	Brabantliner
402	Arriva	Breda, Centraal Station – Breda, Centrum – Breda, Bijster – Hank – Nieuwendijk – Sleeuwijk – Gorinchem – Station Gorinchem	2×/hour	Brabantliner; Weekdays rush hours outside holidays only
617	Arriva	Breda, Centraal Station – Breda, Belcrum Oost – Breda, Krogten – Terheijden – Klundert – Fijnaart	2×/day in both directions	Not during holidays; At morning rush hours buses operate only FROM Fijnaart TO Breda; At afternoons buses operate only FROM Breda TO Fijnaart
618	Arriva	Moerdijk -> Station Lage Zwaluwe -> Zevenbergschen Hoek -> Langeweg -> Wagenberg -> Terheijden -> Breda, Belcrum Oost -> Breda, Centrum -> Breda, Centraal Station	1×/weekday morning rush hour	Not during holidays
