= Heuvel =

- Neighbourhood
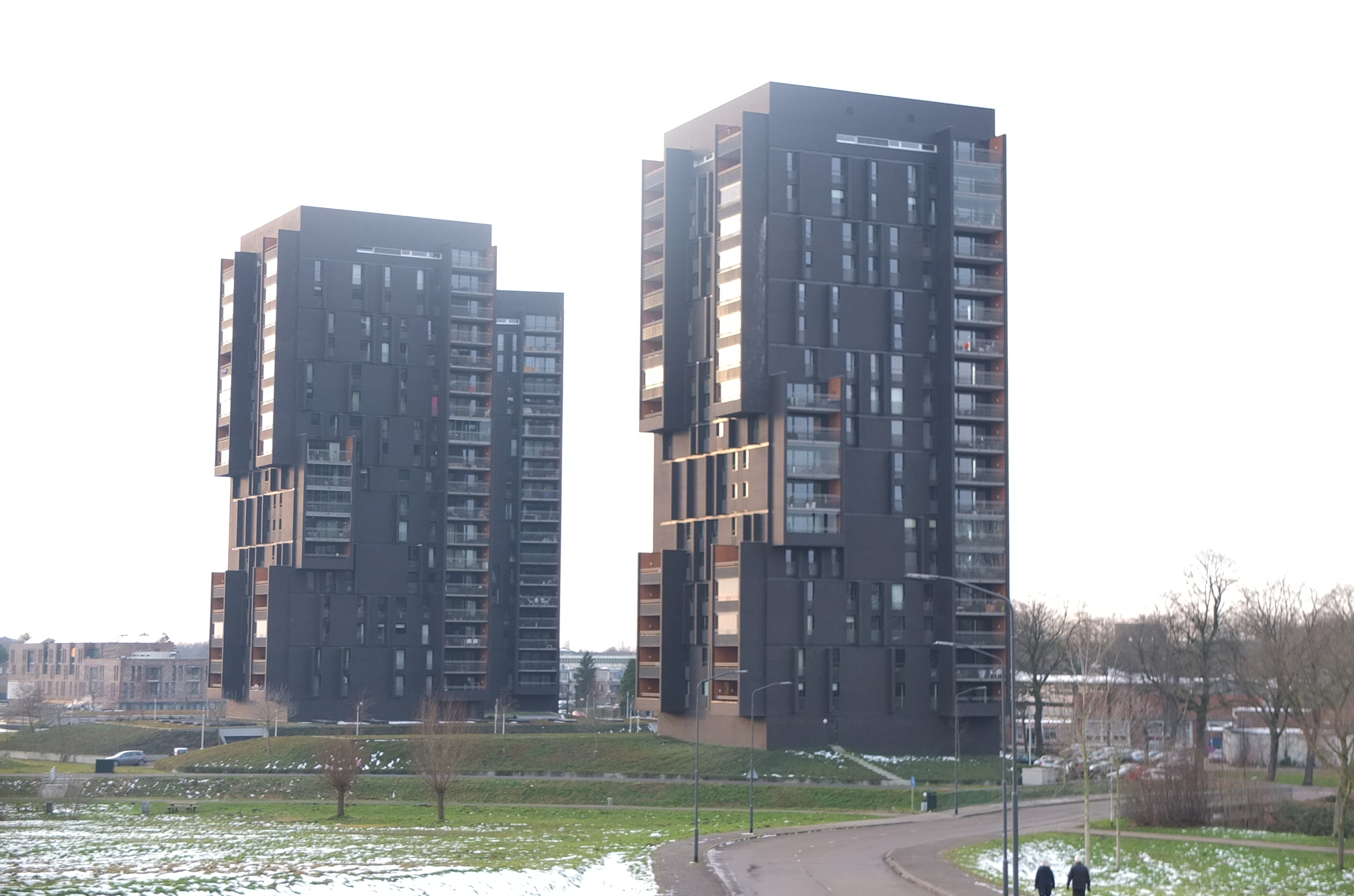
- 2 apartment buildings in Heuvel
- Motto: Kwaliteit maken we samen
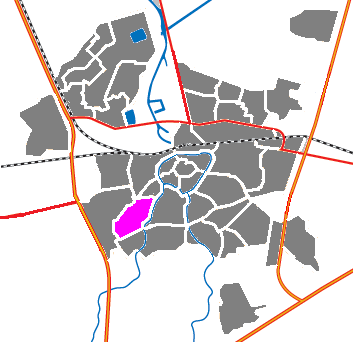
- Photo of Heuvel within Breda

- Location within Netherlands
- Country: Netherlands
- Province: North Brabant
- Municipality: Breda
- City: Breda

Area
  - Total: 1.04 km^{2} (0.40 sq mi)
  - Land: 0.99 km^{2} (0.38 sq mi)
  - Water: 0.05 km^{2} (0.019 sq mi)

Population (2025)
  - Total: 8,100
  - Density: 8,200/km^{2} (21,000/sq mi)
- Time zone: UTC+1 (Central European Time)
  - Summer (DST): UTC+2 (Central European Summer Time)
- Postal code: 4812
- Area code: 076

Heuvel is a neighbourhood of Breda and it has 8,100 inhabitants as of 2025.

== Development and history ==
Since the 15th century, Heuvel was a hamlet part of lordship and later municipality of Princenhage. The name Hovel, where Heuvel comes from is first mentioned in 1317 from the name Mechteld van der Hovel. Heuvel, the hamlet had 2 streets, which currently are Dreef and Heuvelplein. A little bit south of Hovel, you have another hamlet named Eindhoven. Eindhoven was first mentioned in 1187, 45 years before the city Eindhoven was established. Eindhoven also only had 2 streets, which currently are Flierstraat and Talmastraat. The neighbourhood Heuvel was built in the 50s after World War II. Near the Lidl and Jumbo at the Roggeveenstraat, Hudsonstraat and some other streets, new houses are being built.

== Demographics ==
Heuvel has 8,100 inhabitants. As seen in the table below, the greatest age group in Heuvel are young adults.

Age group distribution in Heuvel
Age group	Amount in numbers	Percentage
0-15	1.205	14.9%
15-25	1.060	13.1%
25-45	2.845	35.1%
45-65	1.865	23%
65 or above	1.130	14%

79,4% of inhabitants of Heuvel are born inside of the Netherlands, 20,6% are born outside of the Netherlands. 65,6% of migrants living in Heuvel are born outside of Europe, 34,4% are born inside of Europe.

== Facilities ==
In Heuvel, you have KBS De Parel, an elementary school. You also have Auris De Spreekhoorn, a school for kids with bad hearing or/and a speech impairment.

At the Flierstraat, there is GP De Flier. At Monsigneur Molensplein, there is a childcare facility. There is a meeting center called De Vlieren. At Dr. Struyckenplein, there is a Lidl, Jumbo and Kruidvat.

== Transportation ==
Bus 4 stops at Heuvelbrink, Flierstraat, Monsigneur Molensplein and Rithsestraat going to Breda railway station and Haagse Beemden and Bus 374 stops at Heuvelplein and Rithsestraat going from Made to Zundert.
