= IJpelaar =

Coordinates: 51°34′17″N 4°48′24″E

- Neighbourhood
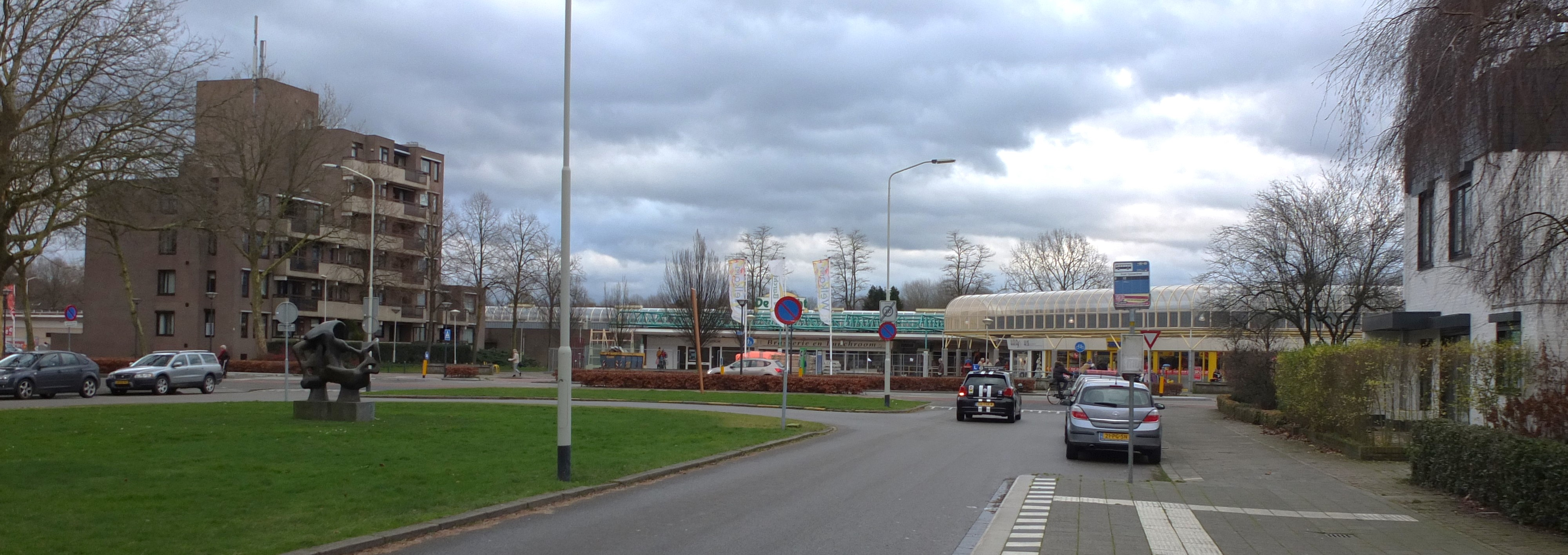
- Sight on winkelcentrum De Burcht in Ijpelaar

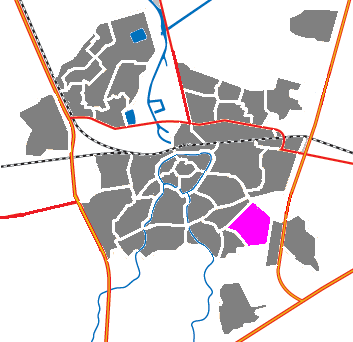
- Map of Breda with IJpelaar in pink
- Country: Netherlands
- Province: North Brabant
- Municipality: Breda
- City: Breda

Area
  - Total: 1.17 km^{2} (0.45 sq mi)
  - Land: 1.17 km^{2} (0.45 sq mi)
  - Water: 0 km^{2} (0 sq mi)

Population (2025)
  - Total: 5.895
  - Density: 5.04/km^{2} (13.0/sq mi)
- Time zone: UTC+1 (CET)
  - Summer (DST): UTC+2 (CEST)
- Postal code: 4834
- Area code: 076

IJpelaar is a neighbourhood in the city Breda. IJpelaar has 5.895 inhabitants.

== History ==
The name IJpelaar first appears on May 13, 1280. In that year, Arnoud van Leuven and his wife Isabella van Breda donated the land between Emmerberg and Den Ypelaer. In the Middle Ages, IJpelaar was a castle a bit north of the modern IJpelaar. IJpelaar was surrounded by water and a few farms around it. Somewhere before 1333, Peter van Ulvenhout got IJpelaar in loan. After that, he changed his name to Peter van IJpelaar. In 1555, castle IJpelaar owned around 80 bunders, translating to 104 hectares. In 1835, the castle asdestroyed. The modern IJpelaar bas uilt in the 60s and 70s, with straight streets and lots of green.

== Demographics ==
Seeing in this table below, the greatest age group of IJpelaar are middle-aged adults (aged 45–65).

Age distribution of IJpelaar
Age group	Amount in numbers	Percentage
0-15	775	13.1%
15-25	625	10.6%
25-45	1210	20.5%
45-65	1400	23.7%
65 or older	1875	31.8%

86,5% of inhabitants are born in the Netherlands, 13,5% are born outside of the Netherlands.

66,7% of foreign-born residents are born outside of Europe, and 33,3% of foreign-born residents inside of Europe.

== Education ==
IJpelaar has 4 schools, they are:

De Burchtgaarde, an elementary school at the Stoutenburgstraat.

Het Kasteel, a special elementary school at the Rijnauwenstraat.

An international bridging class provided by Curio for middle school students.

St. Joost School of Art and Design, an art academy.

== Other facilities ==
At Zwijnsbergenstraat, there is De Burcht, a shopping center. On that same street there is also GP Wilms. There is also a dentist. At the Heeckerenstraat there is an orthodontist.

== Transportation ==
Bus 3 connects IJpelaar with Breda railway station, Haagse Beemden and Nieuw Wolfslaar.
