= Westerpark (Breda) =

- Neighbourhood
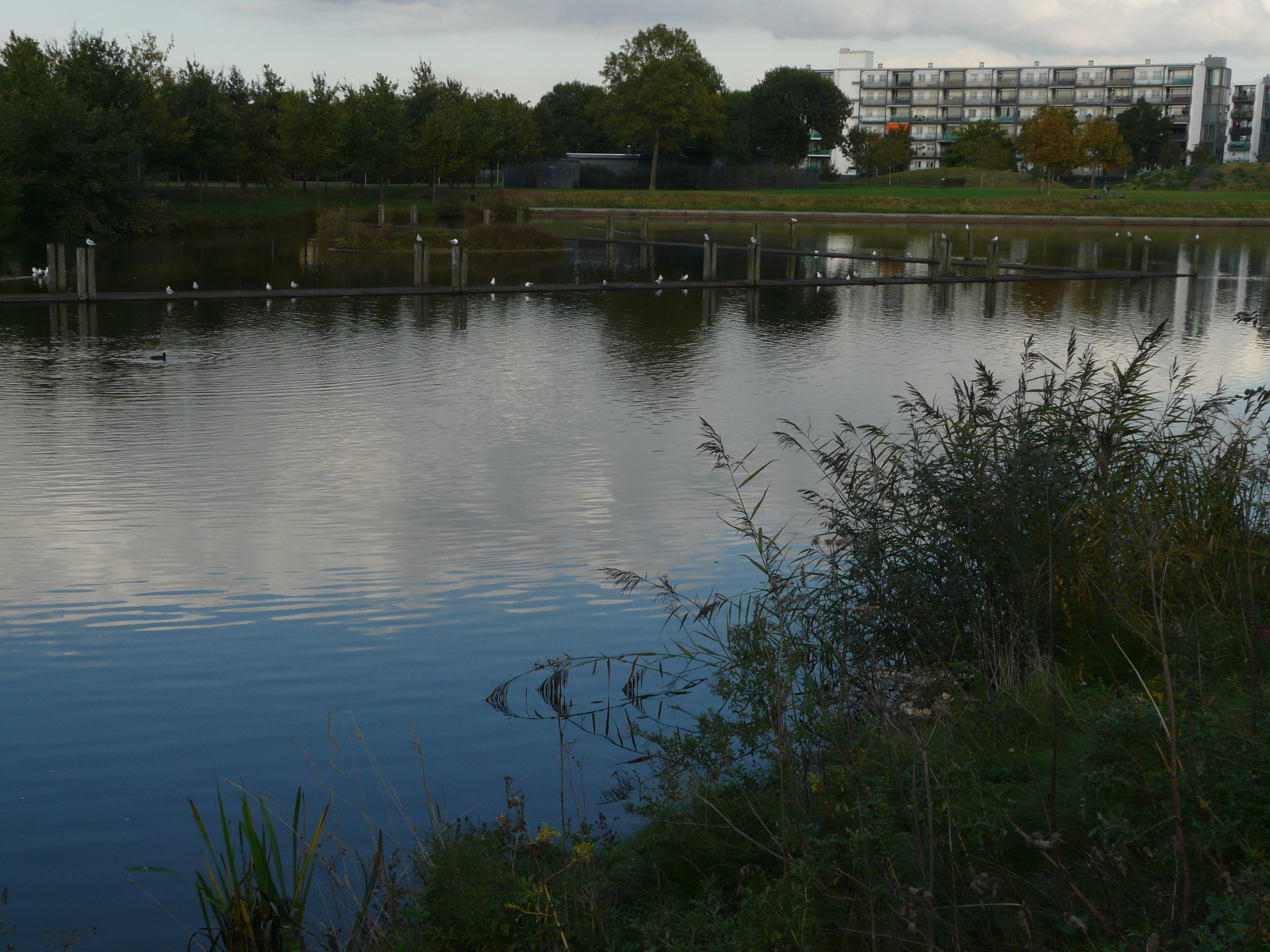
- Photo of Westerpark, showing the park within Westerpark

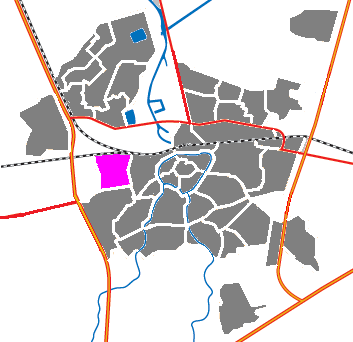
- Location of Westerpark within Breda
- Country: Netherlands
- Province: North Brabant
- Municipality: Breda
- City: Breda
- Established: 1996

Area
  - Total: 0.66 km^{2} (0.25 sq mi)
  - Land: 0.64 km^{2} (0.25 sq mi)
  - Water: 0.02 km^{2} (0.0077 sq mi)

Population (2025)
  - Total: 3,455
  - Density: 5,400/km^{2} (14,000/sq mi)
- Time zone: UTC+1 (+1)
  - Summer (DST): UTC+2 (+2)
- Postal code: 4814
- ISO 3166 code: NL

Westerpark is a neighbourhood in the city Breda. Westerpark has 3.455 inhabitants (2025).

== Development ==
In 1408, the area now known as Westerpark was then known as Buursteden. Later, the area gets its current name of Westerpark. Breda had to build between 1995 and 2015 16.000 houses, so in 1996 Breda started building Westerpark, a Vinex-location having 1.427 houses.

== Demographics ==
Westerpark has 3.455 people, the age group of Westerpark is:

Age group	Population in numbers	Population in percentages
0-15	525	15.2%
15-25	440	12.7%
25-45	820	23.7%
45-65	1.065	30.8%
65 or above	605	17.5%

88,9% of inhabitants are born in the Netherlands, 11,1% are born outside the Netherlands.

59,7% of people born outside the Netherlands are born outside of Europe, 40,3% of people are born inside of Europe.

== Facilities ==
Westerpark has 4 schools, which are De Boomgaard (elementary school), De Campus, which are 3 middle schools consisting of Orion Lyceum (HAVO and VWO), Markenhage (MAVO, HAVO and VWO) and Michaël College (Dalton Education giving MAVO, HAVO and VWO).

At the Steppevlinder, there is a GP named MediVonk. There is a gym named MyLife at Zandoogjes.

== Transportation ==
Bus 373 from Zevenbergen to Breda railway station has 3 stops in Westerpark.
