= Zevenbergen railway station =

Railway station in the Netherlands

Zevenbergen
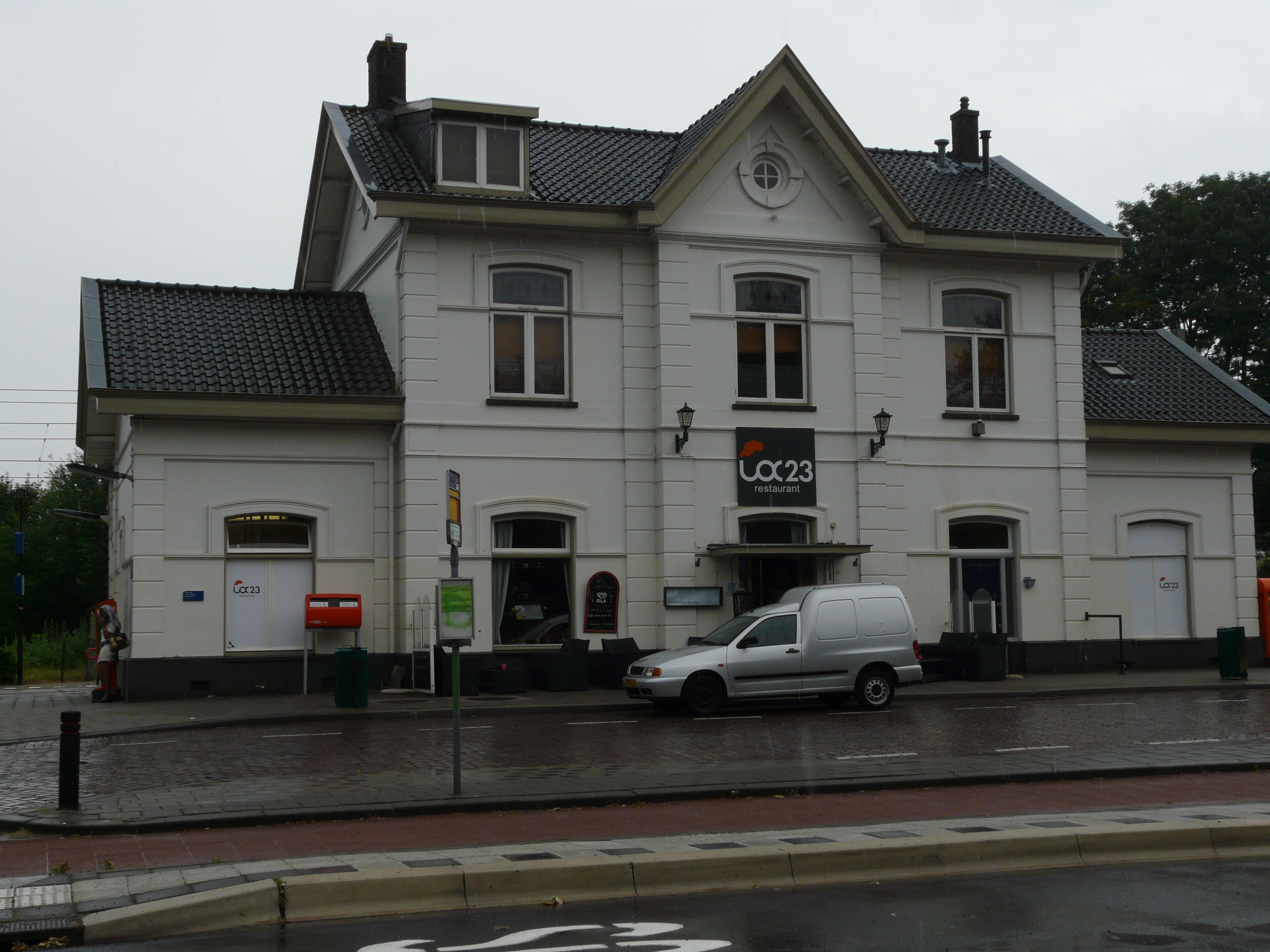

General information
- Location: Netherlands
- Coordinates: 51°38′29″N 4°36′35″E
- Line: Antwerp–Lage Zwaluwe railway

History
- Opened: 1854

Services
Preceding station	Nederlandse Spoorwegen	Following station
Lage Zwaluwe towards Dordrecht	NS Sprinter 5900 2x/hour, but only 1x/hour on evenings and weekends	Oudenbosch towards Roosendaal
Location
- Location within Netherlands

Zevenbergen is a railway station located in Zevenbergen, Netherlands. The station was opened in 1854, and is located on the Antwerp–Lage Zwaluwe railway. The train services are operated by Nederlandse Spoorwegen, with plans for possible additional services in the future.

== Destinations ==
From Zevenbergen train departs for Dordrecht and Roosendaal.

There are also busses going the following lines: 117 Line to Breda CS/ Fijnaart on Saturday it only goes to Klundert.

Line 119: Going to Breda CS/ Zevenbergen Station.

== Train services ==
The following services currently call at Zevenbergen:

- 2x/hour local service (sprinter) Dordrecht - Roosendaal
