= Brabantpark =

- Neighbourhood
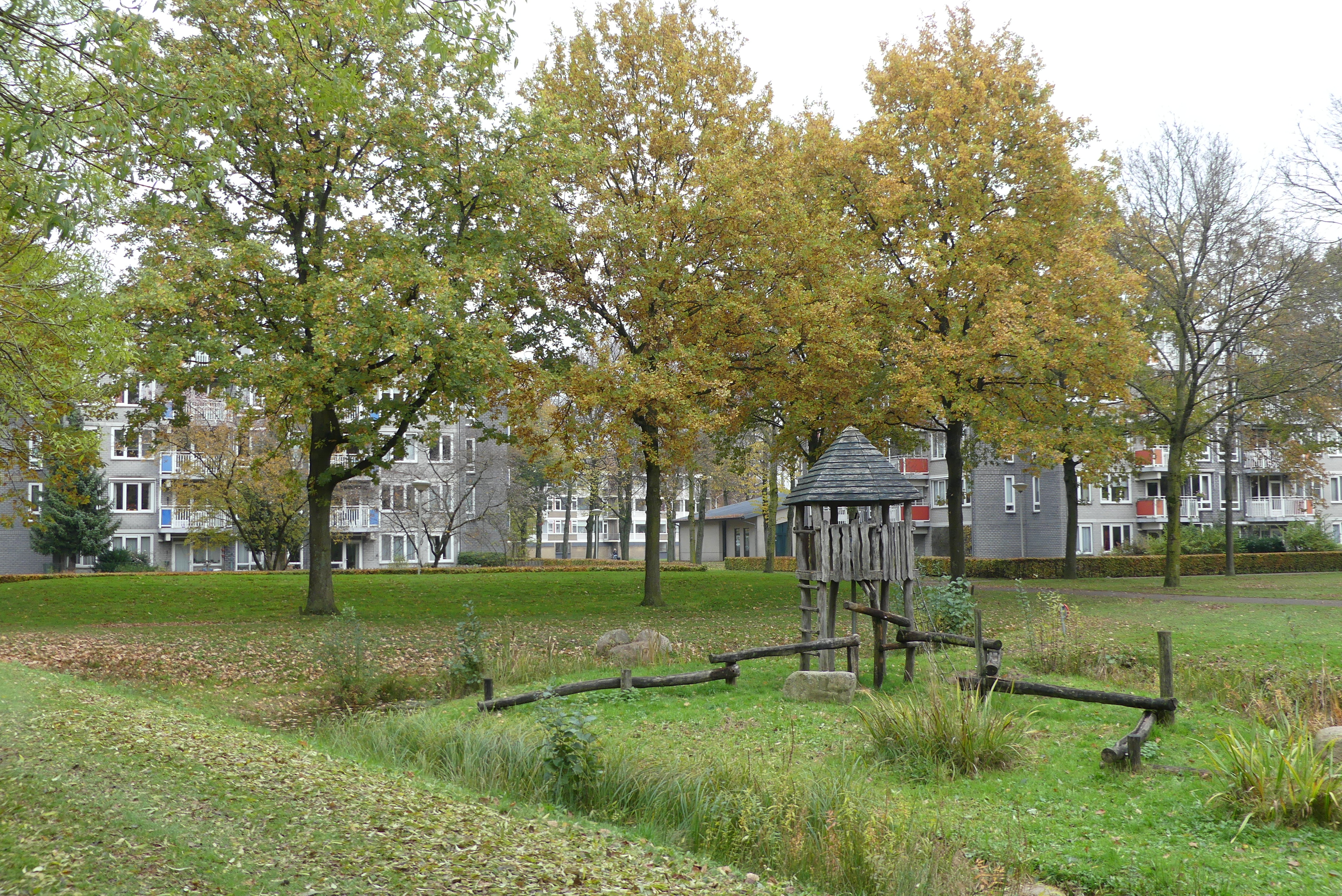
- Photo of a skate park in Brabantpark

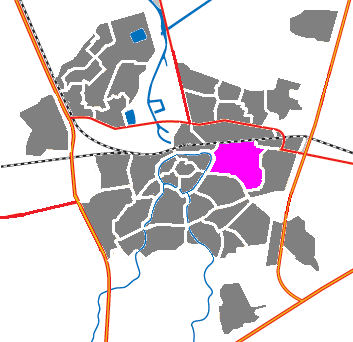
- Brabantpark in pink within Breda
- Country: Netherlands
- Province: North Brabant
- Municipality: Breda
- City: Breda

Area
  - Total: 2.26 km^{2} (0.87 sq mi)
  - Land: 2.25 km^{2} (0.87 sq mi)
  - Water: 0.02 km^{2} (0.0077 sq mi)

Population (2025)
  - Total: 10.910
  - Density: 4.85/km^{2} (12.6/sq mi)
- Time zone: UTC+1 (CET)
  - Summer (DST): UTC+2 (CEST)
- Postal code: 4817
- Area code: 076

Brabantpark is a neighbourhood in the city of Breda in the Netherlands. As of 2025, Brabantpark has 10.910 inhabitants.

== History and development ==
Brabantpark was built in the 1950s to combat the housing crisis after World War II. Some housing already existed in former hamlets within Brabantpark: The houses in the Teteringschedijk (a former hamlet) were built in the 1900s already, some of which are villas, same at the Tilburgsedijk (back then another hamlet called Driesprong), except those were built in the 1920s and 1930s. The 2 hamlets were connected to Breda when Brabantpark was being built.

== Demographics ==
As shown in this table, the greatest age group in Brabantpark are young adults (aged 25-45).

Age distribution in Brabantpark
Age group	Amount in numbers	Percentages
0-15	1.380	12.6%
15-25	2.030	18.6%
25-45	3.405	31.2%
45-65	2.295	21%
65 or above	1.805	16.5%

79,2% of inhabitants are born in the Netherlands, 20,8% of inhabitants are born outside of the Netherlands. 59,7% of foreign-born residents are born outside of Europe and 40,3% of foreign-born residents are born inside of Europe.

== Education ==
In Brabantpark there are 5 schools:

- Breda University of Applied Sciences, the university of Breda
- Breda College, a Special education school with 2 locations, at the Brabantlaan and Wolvenring
- De Fontein, an elementary school at the Kameellaan
- Christoffel, a school which gives Havo, Mavo and Vmbo at middle school level.

== Other facilities ==
At Hooghout, there is a pharmacy named Medsen. On the other side, there is GP Brabantpark. At the Sint Ignatiusstraat, there is Brabantplein, a shopping center.

== Transportation ==
Bus 1 stops at 6 different stops, and bus 5 stops in Brabantpark 4 times. Brabantpark is connected with Hoge Vught, Heusdenhout and Nieuw Wolfslaar.
