= Nieuw Wolfslaar =

- Neighbourhood
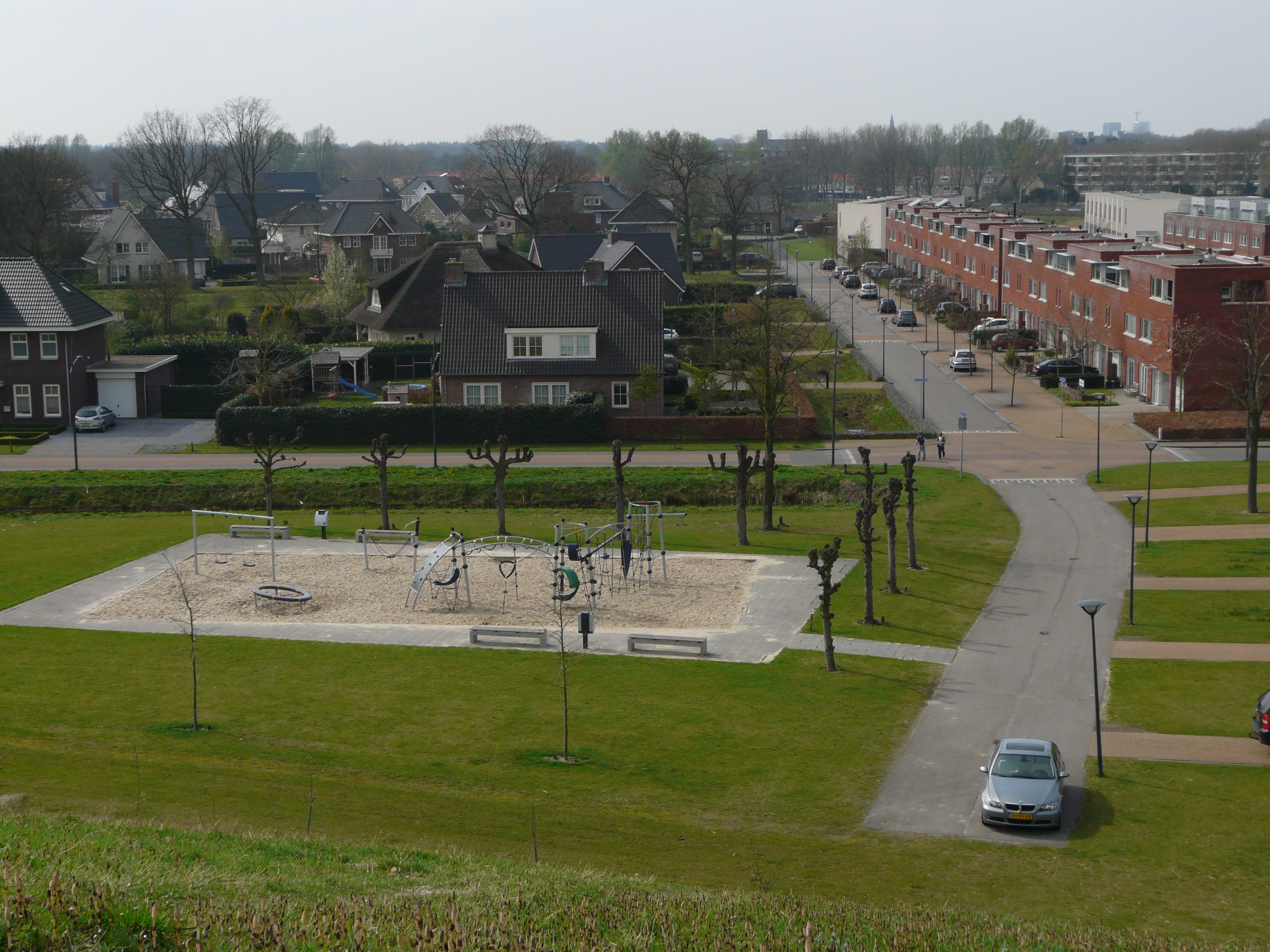
- Photo of Nieuw Wolfslaar

- Map of Nieuw Wolfslaar within Bavel and Breda (Nieuw Wolfslaar in pink)
- Country: Netherlands
- Province: North Brabant
- Municipality: Breda
- Place: Bavel

Area
  - Total: 1.03 km^{2} (0.40 sq mi)
  - Land: 1.03 km^{2} (0.40 sq mi)

Population (2025)
  - Total: 2,280
  - Density: 2,210/km^{2} (5,730/sq mi)
- Time zone: UTC+1 (CET)
  - Summer (DST): UTC+2 (CEST)
- Postal code: 4854
- Area code: 076

Nieuw Wolfslaar is a neighbourhood of village Bavel, which is part of municipality Breda. Nieuw Wolfslaar has 2.280 residents (2025).

== Development ==
Nieuw Wolfslaar is part of Bavel, yet it's split from Bavel by the A27 and closer to Breda than Bavel itself.

Nieuw Wolfslaar is 1 of the newest neighbourhoods of municipality Breda, being built between 2003 and 2005. However, on the current Nieuw Wolfslaarlaan en Bavelselaan, there are also some houses out the 1920s between Ginneken and Bavel. Nieuw Wolfslaar is a Vinex-location, just like Westerpark and Waterdonken.

== Demographics ==
Seeing in the table below, middle-aged adults (aged 45-65) are the greatest age group in Nieuw Wolfslaar.

Age distribution in Nieuw Wolfslaar
Age group	Amount in numbers	Percentage
0-15	360	15.8%
15-25	320	14%
25-45	350	15.4%
45-65	785	34.4%
65 or older	465	20.4%

91,7% of residents are local-born residents, 8,3% are foreign-born residents.

47,4% of foreign-born residents are born outside of Europe, 52,6% of foreign-born residents are born inside of Europe.

== Transportation and facilities ==
Bus 3 starts in Haagse Beemden and goes through Breda railway station and ends in Nieuw Wolfslaar.

There is a residential care facility at Valkenlaar.
