= GO Sharing =

Micromobility company

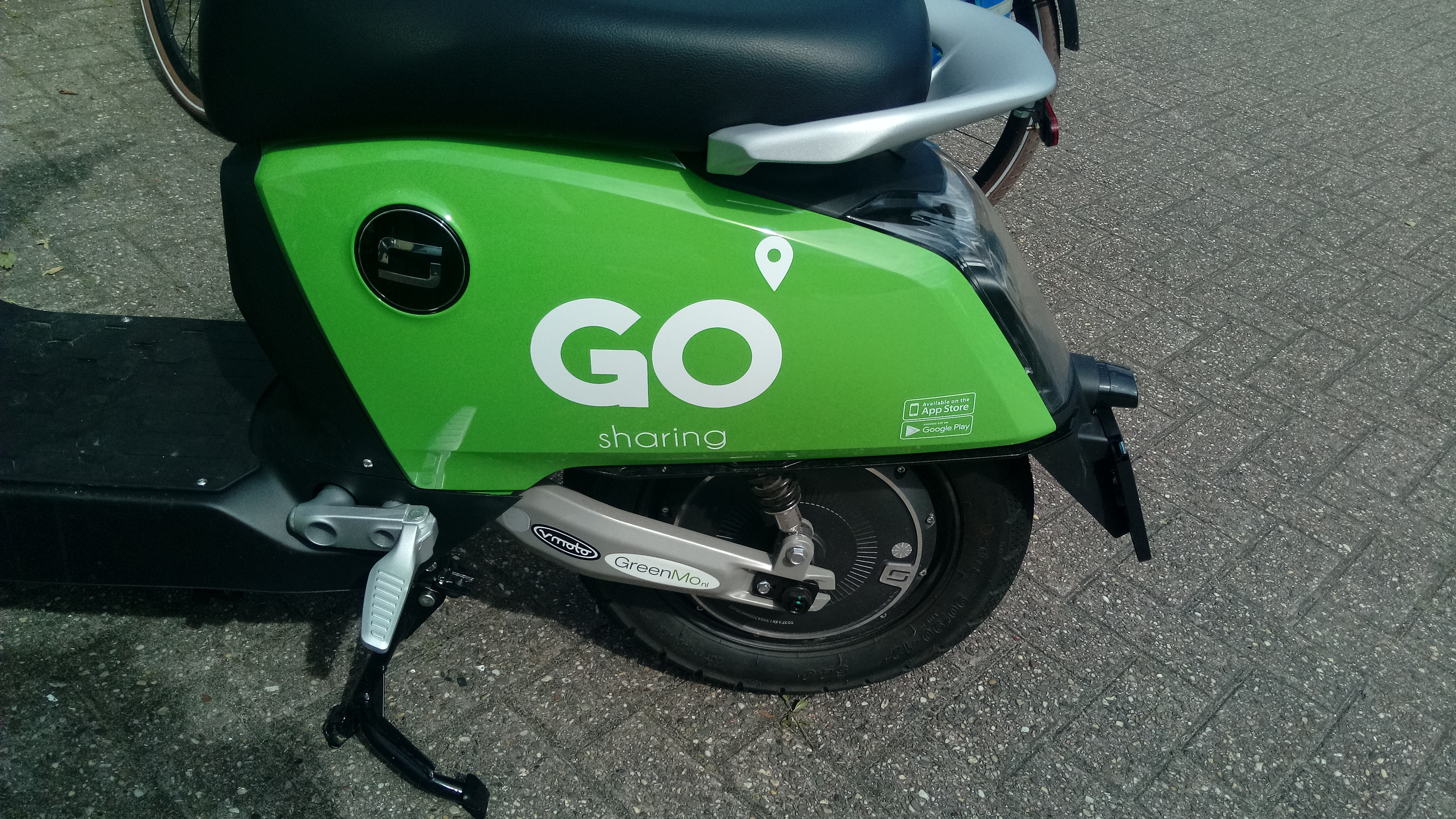
- Industry: Micromobility
- Founded: September 2019; 6 years ago
- Founder: Raymon Pouwels; Doeke Boersma; Donny van den Oever
- Headquarters: Nieuwegein, the Netherlands
- Area served: Europe
- Number of employees: c. 75 (April 2021)
- Website: go-sharing.com

GO Sharing is a micromobility company based in Nieuwegein, the Netherlands. Founded in September 2019 GO Sharing operates shared electric cars, electric bicycles and electric scooters in 36 cities in Europe.

== History ==
In April 2021 GO Sharing raised $60 million in funding to expand its operations.

In May 2021, the Saarland-based provider TRIBe was acquired and operations in Saarbrücken transferred to the GO Sharing brand. For the end of May 2022, it was announced that operations in Saarbrücken and consequently Germany will be discontinued.

On 23 February 2023, Go Sharing announced the company was acquired by BinBin, a big micromobility company in Turkey. Go Sharing would continue to operate under their own brand.
