= Etten-Leur railway station =

Railway station in the Netherlands

Etten-Leur
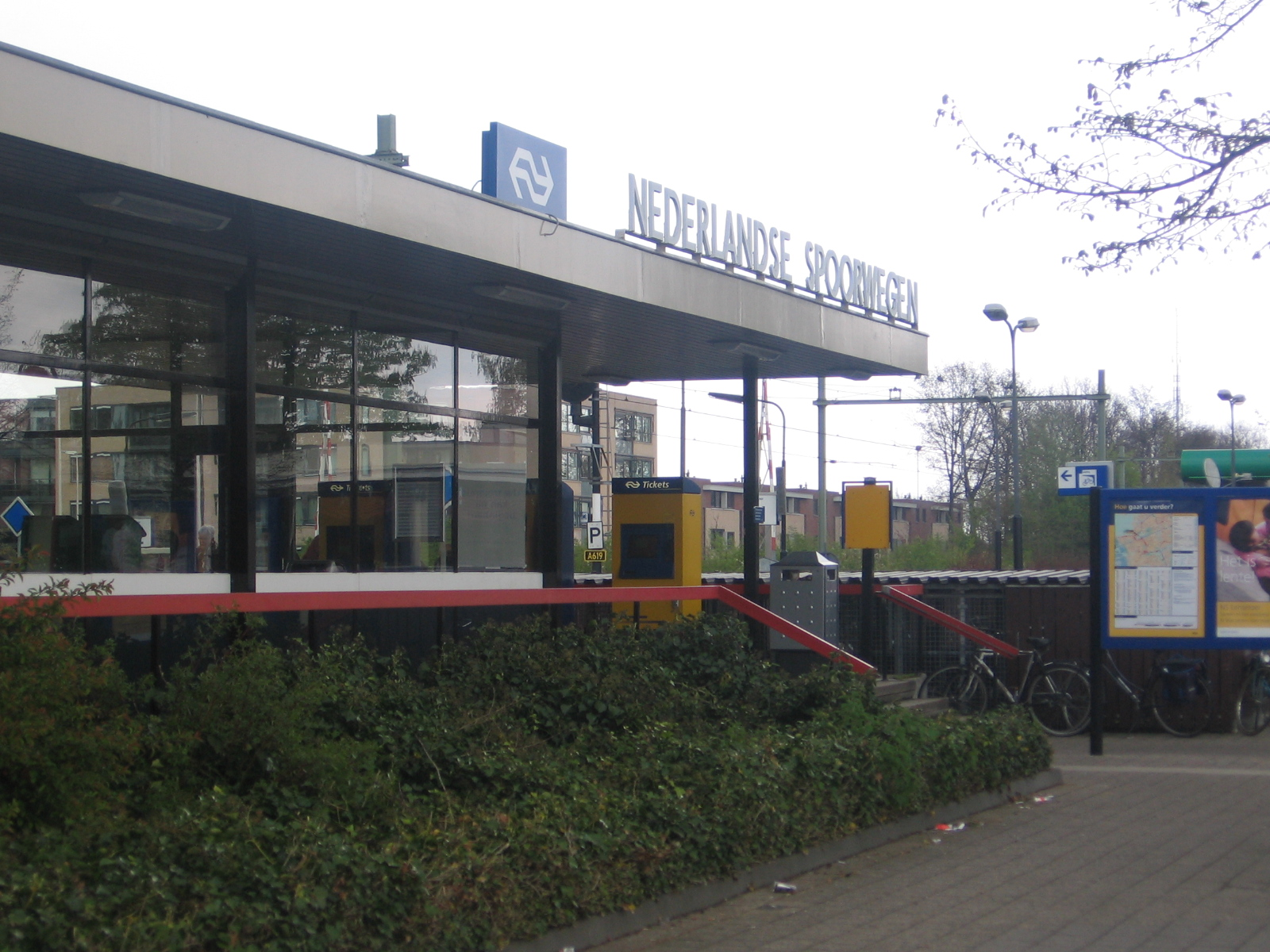

General information
- Location: Netherlands
- Coordinates: 51°34′31″N 4°38′13″E
- Line: Roosendaal–Breda railway

History
- Opened: 11 December 1854

Services
Preceding station	Nederlandse Spoorwegen	Following station
Roosendaal Terminus	NS Intercity 3600	Breda towards Zwolle
Location
- Location within Netherlands

Etten-Leur is a railway station located in Etten-Leur, Netherlands. The station was opened on 11 December 1854 and is located on the Roosendaal–Breda railway. The station is operated by Nederlandse Spoorwegen. The station was closed between 25 September 1940 and 30 May 1972.

== Train service ==
The following services currently call at Etten-Leur:

- 2x per hour intercity services Zwolle - Arnhem - Nijmegen - 's-Hertogenbosch - Roosendaal
