= Tuinzigt =

- Neighbourhood
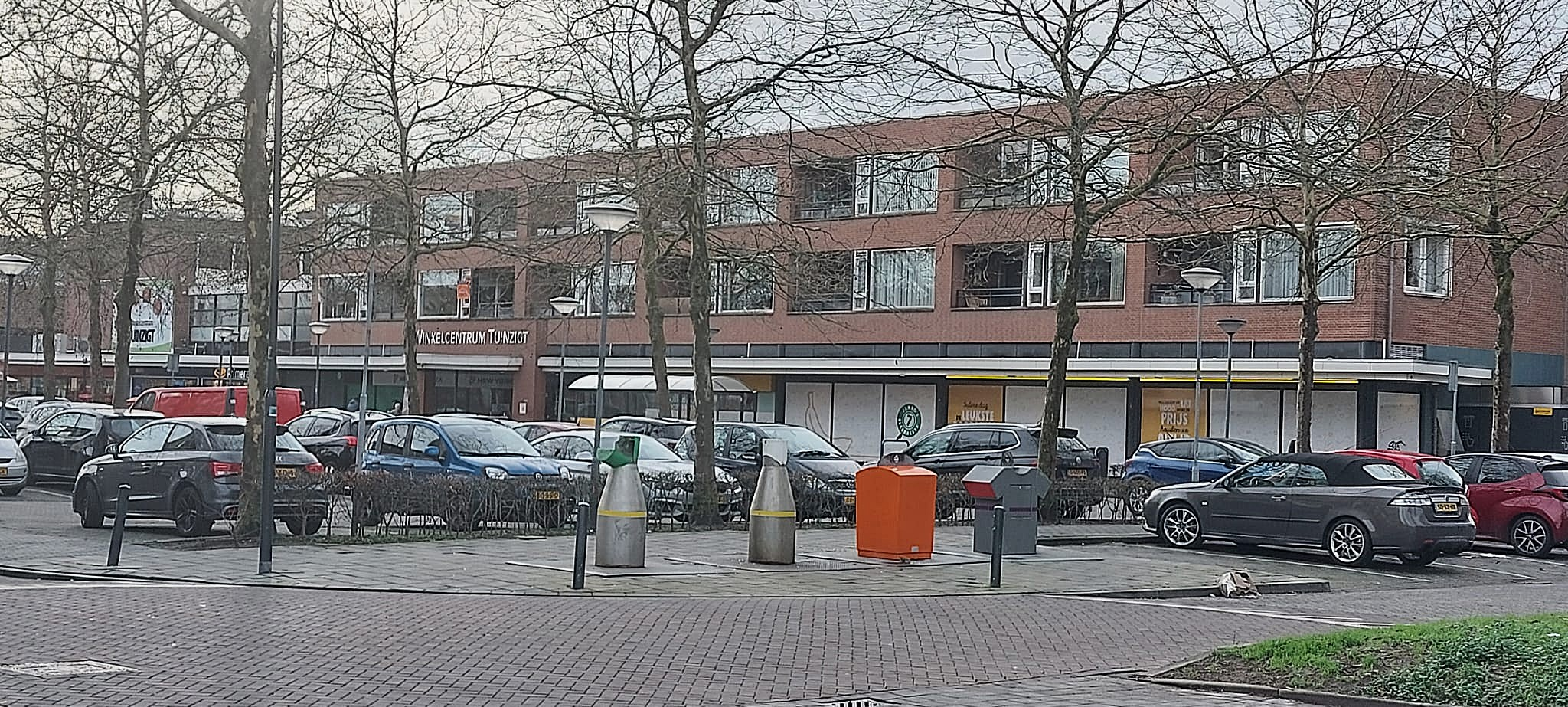
- Winkelcentrum Tuinzigt

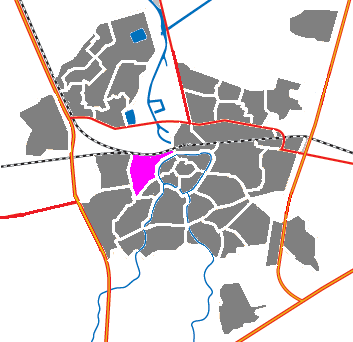
- Tuinzigt marked in pink within Breda

- Location within Netherlands
- Country: Netherlands
- Province: North Brabant
- Municipality: Breda
- City: Breda

Area
  - Total: 1.16 km^{2} (0.45 sq mi)
  - Land: 1.15 km^{2} (0.44 sq mi)
  - Water: 0.01 km^{2} (0.0039 sq mi)

Population (2025)
  - Total: 7.815
  - Density: 6,796/km^{2} (17,600/sq mi)
- Time zone: UTC+1
  - Summer (DST): UTC+2
- Postal code: 4814
- Area code: 076

Tuinzigt is a neighbourhood of Breda with 7,815 inhabitants (2025).

== History ==
The name Tuinzigt comes from Tuinzicht (garden sight), which stands for sight on the gardens of the walls of Breda. When Tuinzigt was first built however, it was known as Westerkwartier. Tuinzigt was built in 1890–1930, just after the Industrial Revolution. Tuinzigt is one of the first neighbourhoods outside the Singels, which is water surrounding the center of Breda.

== Demographics ==
Tuinzigt has 7,815 people living in 4,530 households in 4,115 homes. Seeing in this table, the greatest age group in Tuinzigt are young adults.

Age group	Amount in numbers	Percentage
0-15	865	11.1%
15-25	1,645	21.1%
25-45	2.795	35,8%
45-65	1.610	20,6%
65 or above	905	11,6%

76% of inhabitants are born in the Netherlands, 24% are foreign-born residents.

56,8% of foreign-born residents are born outside of Europe, 43,2% of foreign-born residents are born inside of Europe.

== Facilities ==
In Tuinzigt there is one middle school, which is Prinsentuin Van Cooth Breda. That school does VMBO and MAVO.

At the Kwakkelhutstraat there is a GP, named Medical Centrum Magnolia. At the Acaciastraat there is a pharmacy. At the Haagweg, there is a community center for homeless people, named Annahuis.

At the Clematisstraat, there is a shopping center, Winkelcentrum Tuinzigt. It has a Jumbo.

== Transportation ==
Bus 2 stops at Dijkplein, and 370, 371, 373 and 380 stops at Vincent Van Goghstraat en Tuinzigtlaan.
