= Vinex-location =

1991 Dutch Ministry of VROM policy briefing note

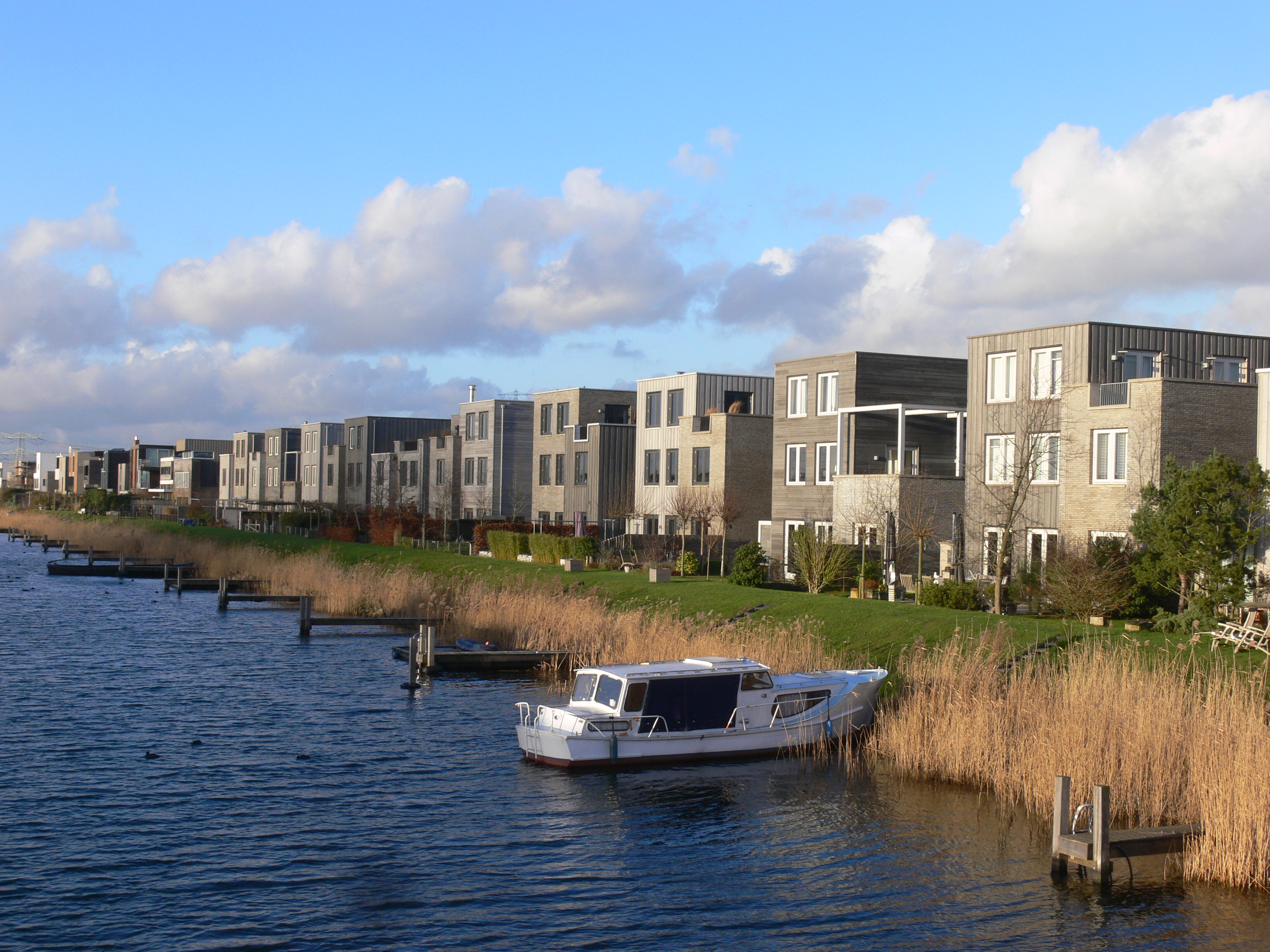
Amsterdam-IJburg

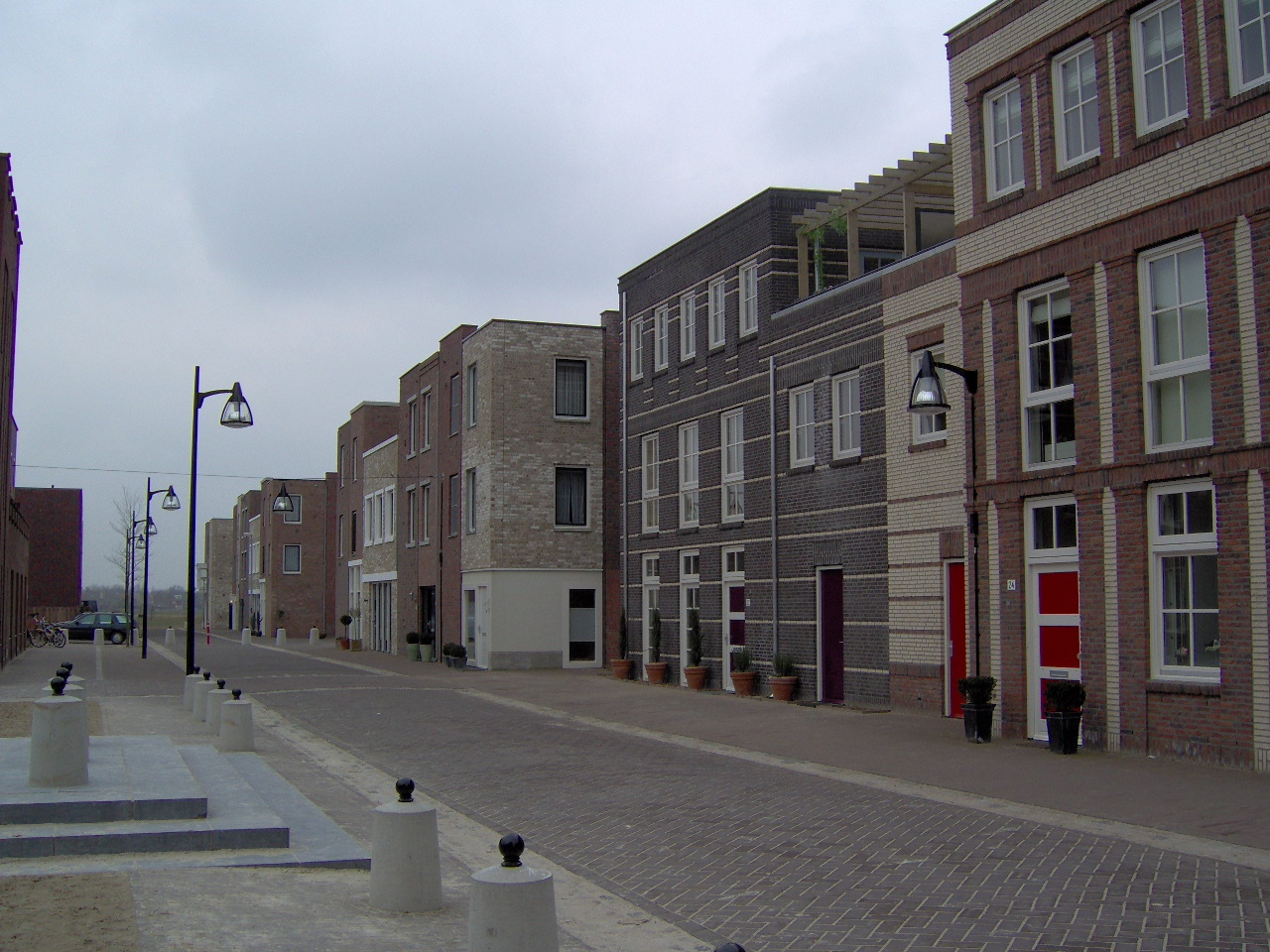
Den Bosch-Haverleij

Vinex ("Vierde Nota Ruimtelijke Ordening Extra"; Fourth Memorandum on Extra Spatial Planning) is a policy briefing note of the Dutch Ministry of Housing, Spatial Planning and the Environment (Ministry of VROM) that was released in 1991. The policy designated large outer city areas for massive new housing development. Neighbourhoods built based on the note are known as Vinex-wijken (Vinex neighbourhoods).

To accommodate the increasing population of the Netherlands the Ministry of VROM determined a number of main points in the Vinex-document for the construction of new housing districts starting in 1993. New districts had to be placed near existing town centers and had to contribute to the following aims:

- Endorsement of existing malls (increasing the potential number of customers)
- Limiting the removals of unsatisfied inhabitants in medium-large cities
- Protecting open areas by concentrating the agglomerations around existing medium-large cities
- Limiting traffic between residencies, work and stores (short distances offer more possibilities for public transport, bicycles and walking)

The Vinex-locations also had to diminish the unfair pricing of housing. That means that certain households live in housing that is too affordable for their income and so it no longer becomes available to households with a lower income. The authorities tried to solve the shortage of affordable housing by luring wealthier households to the more expensive Vinex-locations. Nevertheless, the Vinex-locations had a determined share of affordable rentable houses.
