= Princenhage =

Princenhage ’t Aogje
- Village in Breda
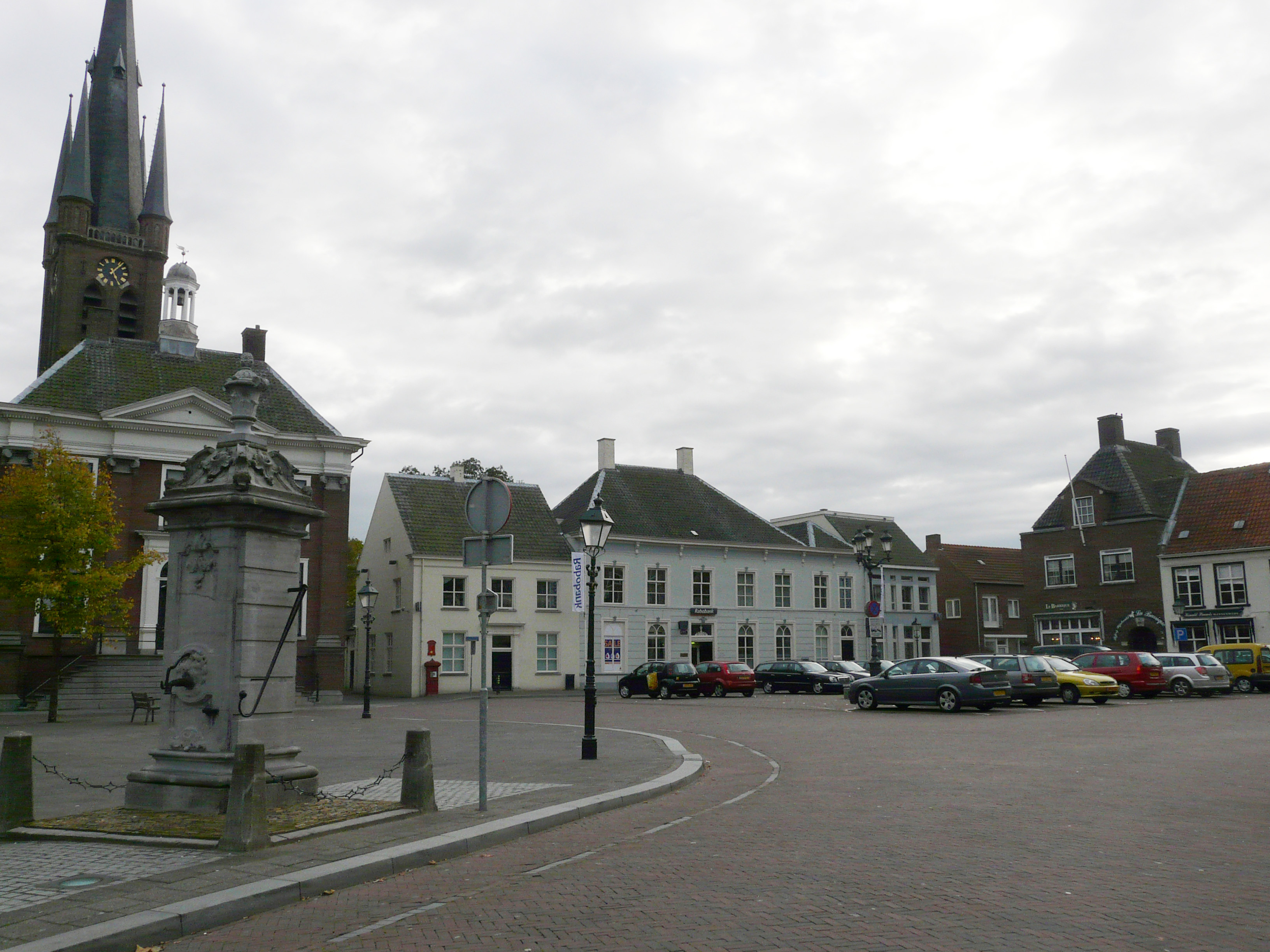
- Haagsemarkt, market square

- Flag Coat of arms

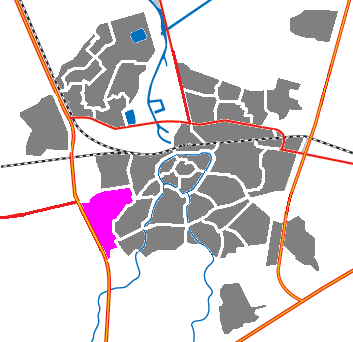

- Location in the province of North Brabant in the Netherlands Princenhage (Netherlands)
- Coordinates: 51°34′34″N 4°44′20″E
- Country: Netherlands
- Province: North Brabant
- Municipality: Breda

Area
  - Total: 2.64 km^{2} (1.02 sq mi)

Population (2021)
  - Total: 8.540
  - Density: 3.23/km^{2} (8.38/sq mi)
- Time zone: UTC+1 (CET)
  - Summer (DST): UTC+2 (CEST)
- Postal code: 4813
- Dialing code: 076

Princenhage (Dutch pronunciation: [ˈprɪnsə(n)ˌɦaːɣə]) is a neighbourhood in the southwest of the city Breda in the Dutch province of North Brabant. The neighbourhood originated as a village so the neighbourhood council or village council, managed to get the neighbourhood, within the municipality council, appointed as a village. Therefor men speaks of "Princenhage Village in Breda".

== History ==
The Lordship Hage was mentioned for the first time in 1198. It was part of the Barony of Breda. The haag (hedge) that gives the name, was a fenced area that served as a hunting ground for the lords of Breda. In 1261 the village on Mertersem (the later Princenhage) became an independent parish. In 1328, Mertersem received a bench of aldermen. Until 1796 the village was governed by the sheriff a seven aldermen. In the same year the parish of Beek split off.

Princenhage was an independent municipality since the 19th century. First as “Haage” with a large territory in the northwest and southwest of Breda. Gradually the territory lost pieces to the growing Breda. When the municipality’s were rearranged, during World War II in 1942, the Southern part and the village Princenhage were added to the municipality Breda. The Northern part with the village “Beek” (brook) became an independent municipality that was named Prinsenbeek later on. The city district of the Haagse Beemden partly owes its name to the lordship Hage.

In 1819 the prefix "Princen" was added. . Possibly referring to the Prince of Orange, since 1538 the Lord of Breda.

There is an anecdote that the people of Princenhage mocked the inhabitants of 's-Gravenhage (The Hague), which stands for ""The Count's Hedge". They only had a count while Princenhage had a prince.

== Born in Princenhage ==
- Kees Rijvers (1926), Dutch former footballer
- Jos Suijkerbuijk (1929-2015), Dutch professional road bicycle racer
- Leo Canjels (1933-2010), Dutch international footballer

== Buried in Princenhage ==
Several ancestors and relatives of the Dutch painter Vincent van Gogh and his brother Theo van Gogh are buried in the Haagveld cemetery.

- Vincent (Ferdinand Jacob) van Gogh (1789-1874), Minister and Grandfather of Vincent and Theo
- Elisabeth Huberta van Gogh-Vrijdag (1857), Grandmother of Vincent and Theo (spouse of Vincent Ferdinand Jacob)
- Vincent van Gogh "Uncle Cent" (1820-1888), art dealer and uncle of Vincent and Theo
- Cornelia van Gogh-Carbentus (1829-1913), aunt of painter Vincent and Theo (spouse of Uncle Cent)
