= Roosendaal railway station =

Railway station in the Netherlands

Roosendaal
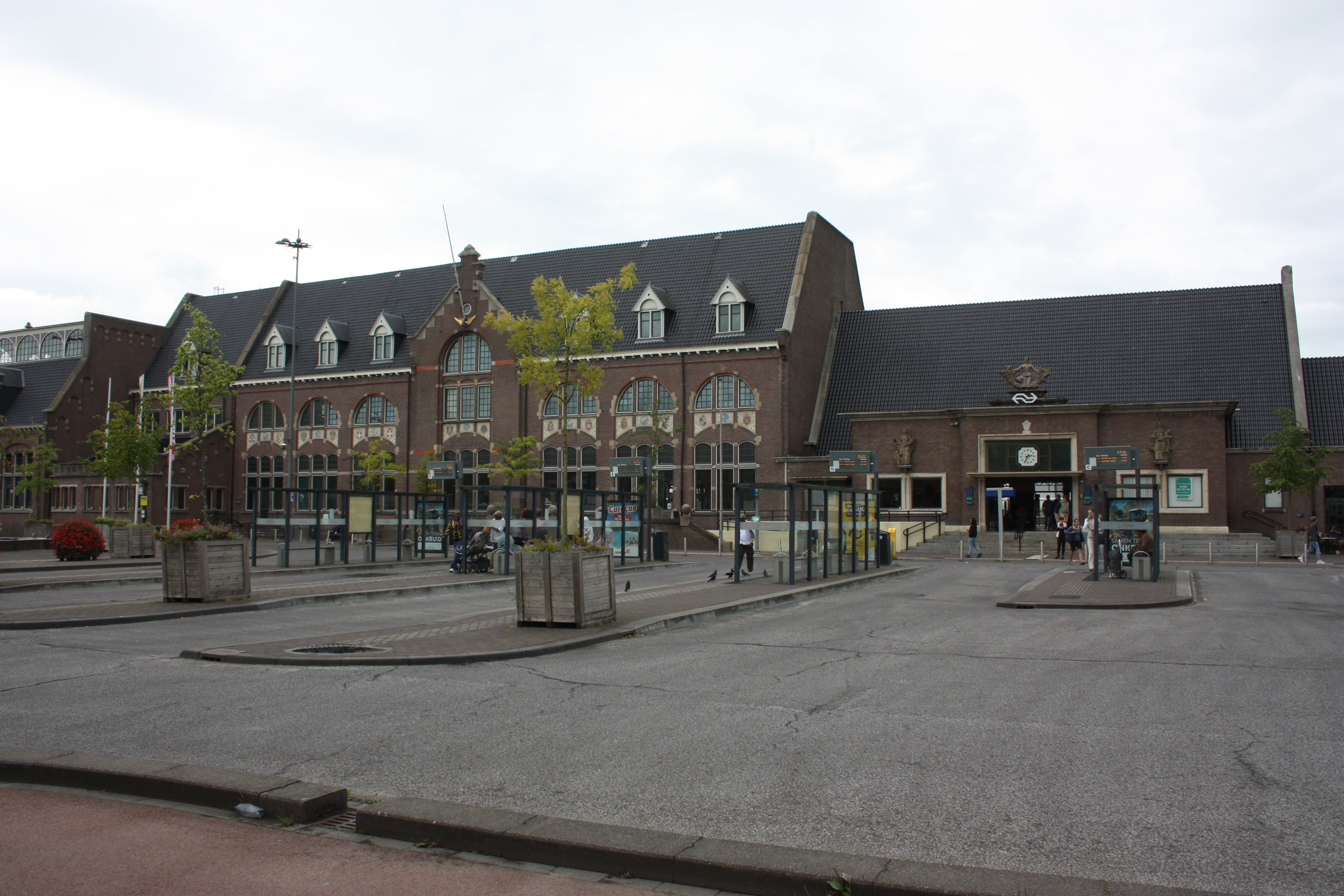

General information
- Location: Netherlands
- Coordinates: 51°32′25″N 4°27′32″E
- Lines: Antwerp–Lage Zwaluwe railway Roosendaal–Breda railway Roosendaal–Vlissingen railway
- Connections: Arriva: 1, 2, 3, 4, 103, 104, 111, 112, 211, 220, 312

Other information
- Station code: Rsd

History
- Opened: 3 July 1854

Services
Preceding station	Nederlandse Spoorwegen	Following station
Bergen op Zoom towards Vlissingen	NS Intercity 2200	Dordrecht towards Amsterdam Centraal
Bergen op Zoom towards Vlissingen	NS Intercity 2300 Mon-Fri until 20:00	Dordrecht towards Amsterdam Centraal
Terminus	NS Intercity 3600	Etten-Leur towards Zwolle
Terminus	NS Sprinter 5900	Oudenbosch towards Dordrecht
Bergen op Zoom towards Vlissingen	NS Sprinter 6500	Terminus
Preceding station	NMBS/SNCB	Following station
Terminus	L 22	Essen towards Puurs
Preceding station	European Sleeper	Following station
Antwerpen-Centraal towards Brussels-South	Brussels–Prague	Rotterdam Centraal towards Prague
Location
- Location within Netherlands

Roosendaal is a railway station in the city of Roosendaal, Netherlands. The station opened on 3 July 1854 on the Antwerp–Lage Zwaluwe railway and is the beginning of the Roosendaal–Vlissingen railway. Roosendaal was the first station in North Brabant to be built. Roosendaal is also a border station between the Netherlands and Belgium. Trains in Belgium run on the left side of double-track whereas in the Netherlands right-hand running is the norm. At some borders, the changeover is achieved by using a flyover, but at Roosendaal trains stop and await a signal to allow them to proceed to the opposite track.

Since June 2015 there has been an NMBS ticket machine at the station to buy Belgian train tickets.

== Train services ==
The station is served by the following services:

- 2× per hour intercity service Amsterdam - Haarlem - Leiden - The Hague - Rotterdam - Dordrecht - Roosendaal - Vlissingen (Between Roosendaal and Vlissingen: On weekdays except evenings 1× per hour express service, only stopping at Bergen op Zoom, Goes and Middelburg and 1× per hour local service stopping at all stations, on evenings and weekends 2× per hour local service)
- 2× per hour intercity services Zwolle - Deventer - Zutphen - Arnhem - Nijmegen - 's-Hertogenbosch - Tilburg - Breda - Roosendaal
- 2× per hour local service (sprinter) Dordrecht - Roosendaal
- 1× per hour local service (sprinter) Roosendaal - Vlissingen (only on weekdays except evenings)
- 1× per hour local service (stoptrein) Roosendaal - Essen - Antwerp - Antwerp-South - Puurs
- 3× per week European Sleeper service Brussels - Roosendaal - Amsterdam - Berlin - Prague

As of April 9, 2018 the international service Amsterdam - Brussels will be running on the HSL-Zuid with a stop at Breda and does not call at Dordrecht and Roosendaal anymore. Passengers for Belgium can take a train to Breda and change trains there or can take the local service Roosendaal - Puurs and change trains at Antwerp for Mechelen, Brussels Airport and Brussels

== Bus services ==
Roosendaal is served by city bus services (stadsbussen) as well as regional bus services (streekbussen). All bus services are operated by Arriva

=== Stadsbussen ===
There are 4 city bus lines. From the railway station the city bus lines provides services to/from:

- Roselaar bus station (downtown area)
- Bravis Ziekenhuis (Hospital)
- WVS (Training company)
- The neighbourhoods Burgerhout, Bovendonk, Fatimawijk, Kalsdonk, Kortendijk, Kroeven, Langdonk, Tolberg and Weihoek

The neighbourhood Westrand and the Rosada Factory Outlet Center are served by regional bus services (see also: Streekbussen)

The routes of the city buses are as follows:

Line	Route	Frequency	Notes
1	Damastberg - Tolberg West - Weihoek - Bravis Ziekenhuis - Roselaar busstation - Station - Fatimawijk - Kortendijk - Sterrebos	2x/hour	Arrives/Continues as line 2 at Damastberg; Arrives/Continues as line 3 at Sterrebos; On evenings and Sundays buses operate only in one direction: From Damastberg to Sterrebos; On Saturday mornings until +/- 11:00am buses also operate only in one direction: From Sterrebos to Damastberg
2	Odiliadonk - Langdonk West - Bovendonk - A-Dijk - Fatimawijk - Kalsdonk - Station - Roselaar busstation - Tolberg Oost - Damastberg	2x/hour	Arrives/Continues as line 3 at Odiliadonk; Arrives/Continues as line 1 at Damastberg; On evenings and Sundays buses operate only in one direction: From Odiliadonk to Damastberg; On Saturday mornings until +/- 11:00am buses also operate only in one direction: From Damastberg to Odiliadonk
3	Sterrebos - Langdonk Oost - Burgerhout - Station - Roselaar busstation - Kroeven - Odiliadonk	2x/hour	Arrives/Continues as line 1 at Sterrebos; Arrives/Continues as line 2 at Odiliadonk; On weekdays outside holidays between 1:00pm and 7:00pm services on this line are split into two separate sections: Sterrebos-Station and Station-Odiliadonk. Passengers from Sterrebos, Langdonk Oost and Burgerhout to Roselaar busstation, Kroeven and Odiliadonk and vice versa are required to make a transfer at the station at these times; On evenings and Sundays buses operate only in one direction: From Sterrebos to Odiliadonk; On Saturday mornings until +/- 11:00am buses also operate only in one direction: From Odiliadonk to Sterrebos
4	Station -> Borchwerf -> WVS -> Borchwerf -> Station	4x/day	Not on evenings and weekends

=== Streekbussen ===
The regional bus lines provides services to/from:

- Roselaar busstation (downtown area)
- The Rosada Factory Outlet Center
- Zegestede Cemetery
- The neighbourhoods Fatimawijk and Westrand
- The nearby cities Bergen op Zoom, Breda and Etten-Leur
- Villages around Roosendaal

The routes of the regional buses, serving Roosendaal, are as follows:

Line	Route	Frequency	Notes
103	Roosendaal, Westrand - Roosendaal, Roselaar busstation - Roosendaal, Station - Oud Gastel - Oud Gastel, Busstation - Fijnaart - Oude Molen - Willemstad	1x/hour	Combined half-hourly service on weekdays except evenings with line 111 on section Roosendaal, Westrand-Oud Gastel, Busstation; At evenings and Sundays buses do not run on section Oud Gastel, Busstation-Willemstad; At Saturday evenings and Sundays the section Roosendaal, Westrand-Roosendaal, Station is also not served
104	Roosendaal, Station - Roosendaal, Roselaar busstation - Roosendaal, Rosada Factory Outlet Center - Wouw - Wouw, Omgang - Wouwse Plantage - Huijbergen - Woensdrecht - Hoogerheide - Bergen op Zoom - Bergen op Zoom, Station Bergen op Zoom	1x/hour	Not on evenings and weekends; Combined half-hourly service with line 112 on section Roosendaal, Station-Wouw, Omgang
111	Roosendaal, Westrand - Roosendaal, Roselaar busstation - Roosendaal, Station - Roosendaal, Spoorstraat - Oud Gastel - Oud Gastel, Busstation - Stampersgat - Dinteloord - Steenbergen - Lepelstraat - Halsteren - Bergen op Zoom - Bergen op Zoom, Station Bergen op Zoom	1x/hour	Not on evenings and weekends; Combined half-hourly service with line 103 on sections Roosendaal, Westrand-Oud Gastel, Busstation
112	Roosendaal, Station - Roosendaal, Roselaar busstation - Roosendaal, Rosada Factory Outlet Center - Wouw - Wouw, Omgang - Heerle - Bergen op Zoom - Bergen op Zoom, Bravis Ziekenhuis - Bergen op Zoom, Station Bergen op Zoom	1x/hour	Combined half-hourly service on weekdays except evenings with line 104 on section Roosendaal, Station-Wouw, Omgang
211	Nispen - Roosendaal, Roselaar busstation - Roosendaal, Station - Zegge - Bosschenhoofd - Bosbad Hoeven - Oudenbosch	1x/hour	Not on evenings and weekends
220	Roosendaal, Station - Roosendaal, Roselaar busstation - Schijf - Achtmaal - Zundert - Klein Zundert	1x/hour	Not on evenings and weekends
312	Roosendaal, Station - Roosendaal, Fatimawijk - Roosendaal, Zegestede Cemetery - Rucphen - Sprundel - Sint Willebrord - Etten-Leur - Etten-Leur, Centrum - Breda - Breda, Centraal Station	1x/hour	Not between Etten-Leur, Centrum and Breda, Centraal Station on evenings and Sundays; At evenings and Sundays buses arrive/continue at Etten-Leur, Centrum as line 316 from/to Breda and Breda, Centraal Station
