= Zevenbergen =

- City
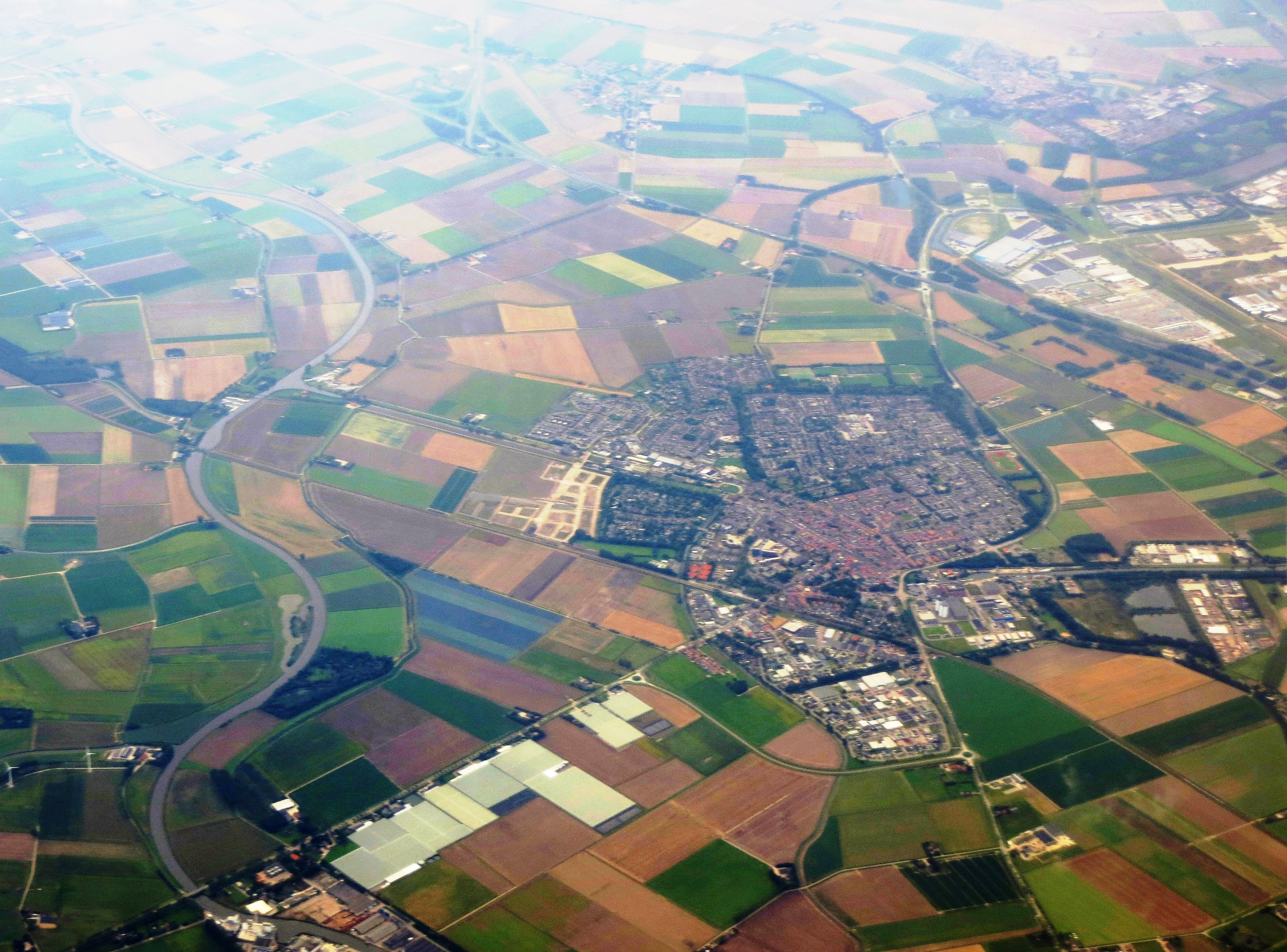
- Aerial view

- Flag Coat of arms

- Location in the province of North Brabant in the Netherlands Zevenbergen (Netherlands)
- Coordinates: 51°38′43″N 4°35′59″E
- Country: Netherlands
- Province: North Brabant
- Municipality: Moerdijk

Area
  - Total: 19.85 km^{2} (7.66 sq mi)
- Elevation: 0.3 m (0.98 ft)

Population (2021)
  - Total: 14,530
  - Density: 732.0/km^{2} (1,896/sq mi)
- Time zone: UTC+1 (CET)
  - Summer (DST): UTC+2 (CEST)
- Postal code: 4760-4762
- Dialing code: 0168

Zevenbergen (from Dutch zeven, although it is unsure for which reason, and bergen, meaning "mountains") is a Dutch city which is a part of the municipality of Moerdijk. Zevenbergen is located in the northwest of the province of North Brabant near Breda.

== History ==
Zevenbergen (literal translation: Seven Mountains) is presumably named after the hills that formed a natural barrier of protection during the time of the Roman Empire. The actual number of hills is debatable however and was most likely not seven. Archeological excavations in 1964 and 1965 revealed that two of the hills were already present during the Bronze Age.

From the mid-nineteenth century until the end of the twentieth century, Zevenbergen was most famous for its sugar production comprising three sugar factories. As a result of the sugar transport requirement, Zevenbergen got its railways, as well as the harbour located at the end of the "Mark" canal.

Zevenbergen was a separate municipality until 1997, when it merged with Fijnaart en Heijningen, Klundert, Standdaarbuiten and Willemstad. The name of the new municipality was originally "Zevenbergen", but was changed to "Moerdijk" in 1998.

== Public transport ==
The Zevenbergen railway station has, together with nearby Oudenbosch, one of the oldest station buildings still existing in the Netherlands. The only older station building is the Valkenburg railway station.

== Notable people ==
- Vincent van Gogh, the famous Dutch painter, lived in Zevenbergen for part of his life.
- Leo Riemens (1910–1985) from Zevenbergen was a Dutch musicologist and cultural journalist, co-author of Großes Sängerlexikon.

== Gallery ==
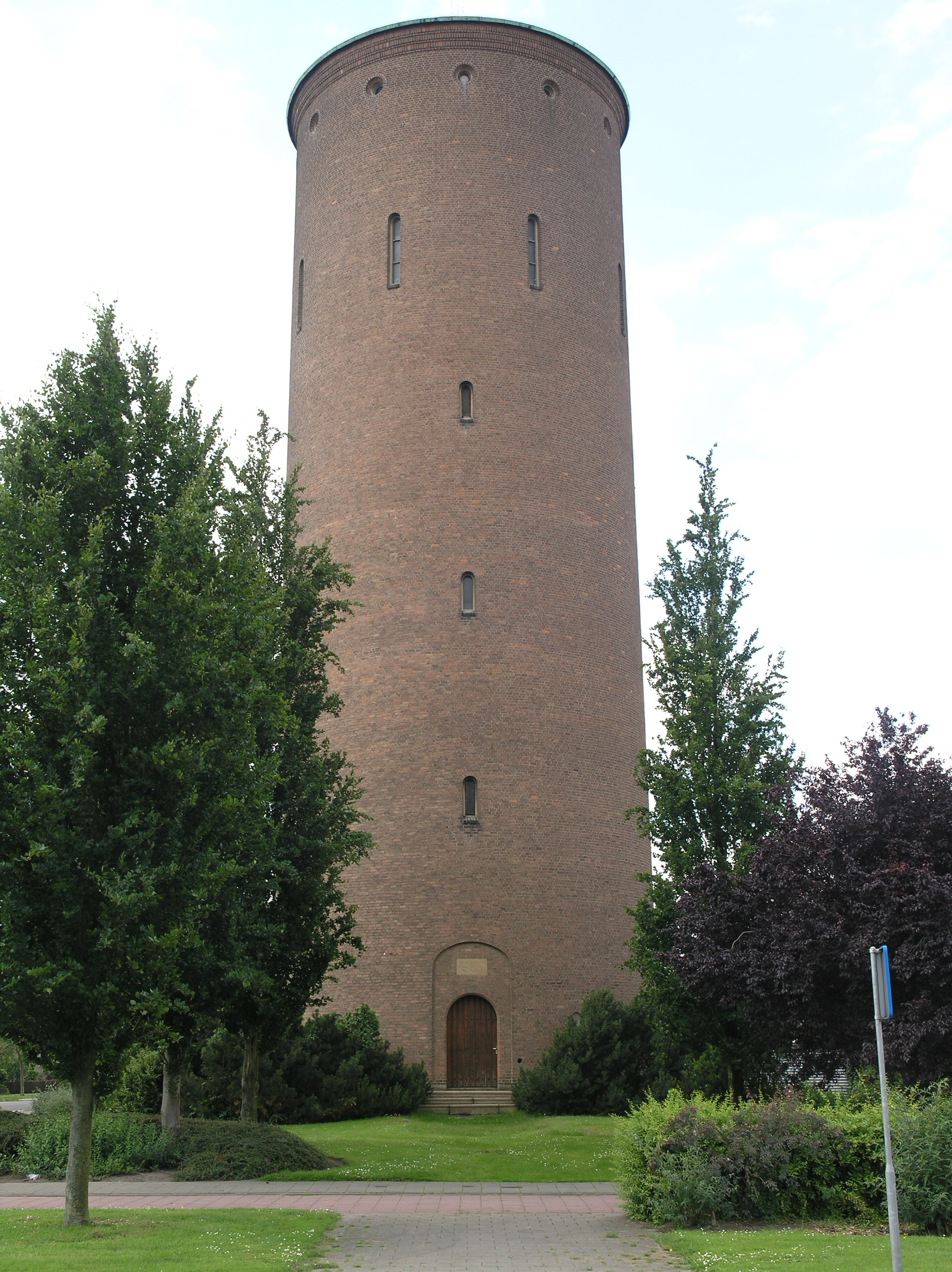
Water tower

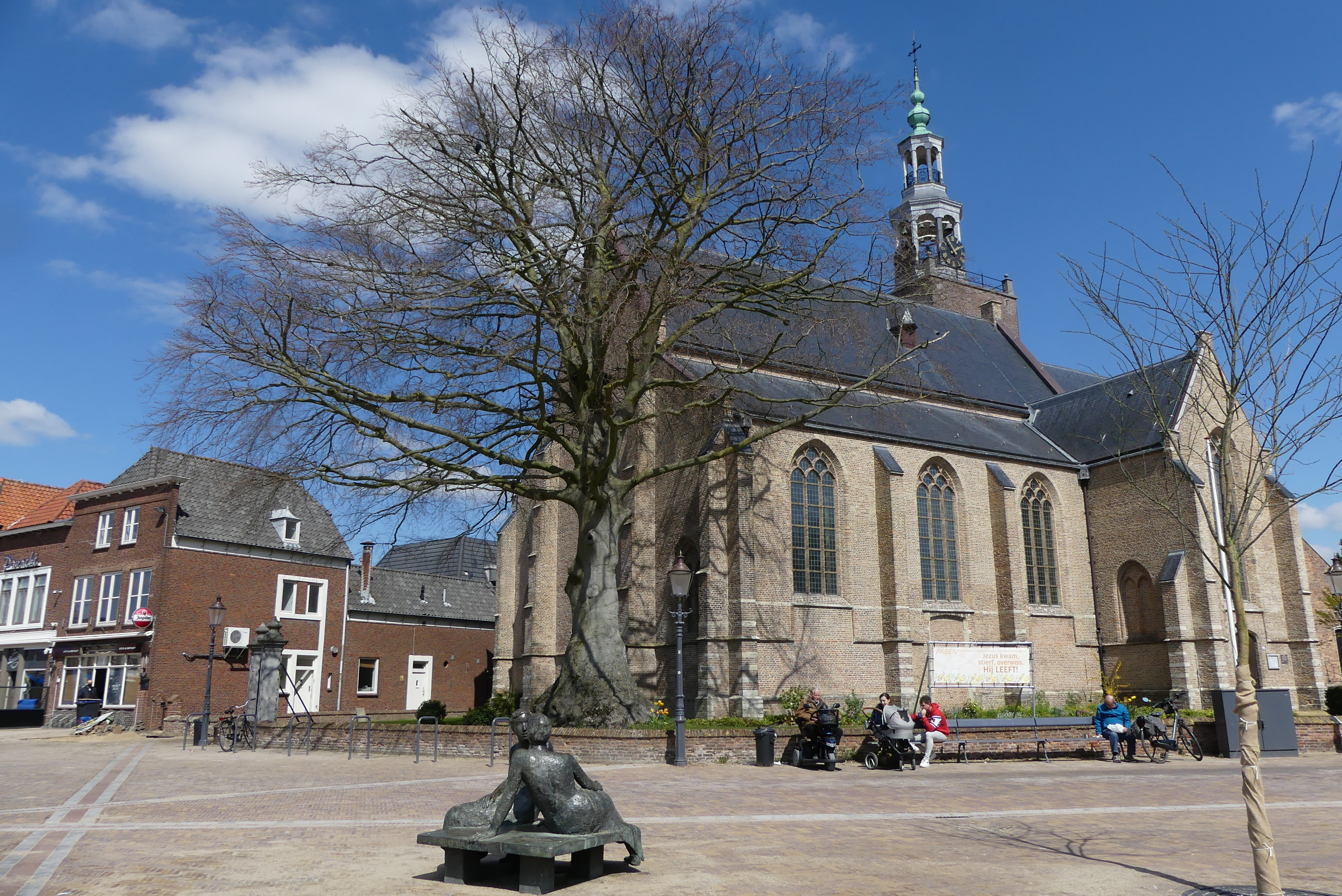
Market with St Catharina Church

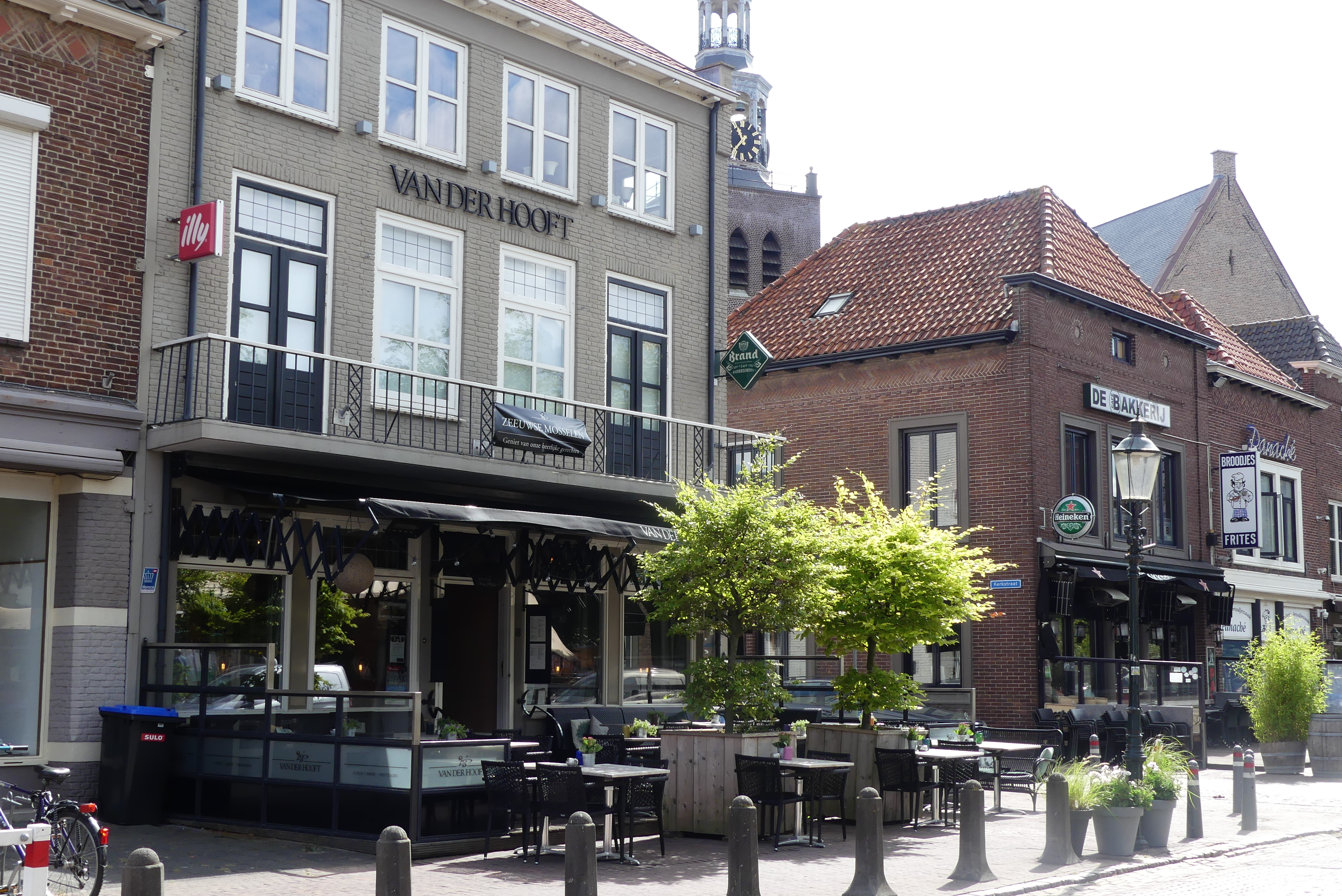
Pubs on the market

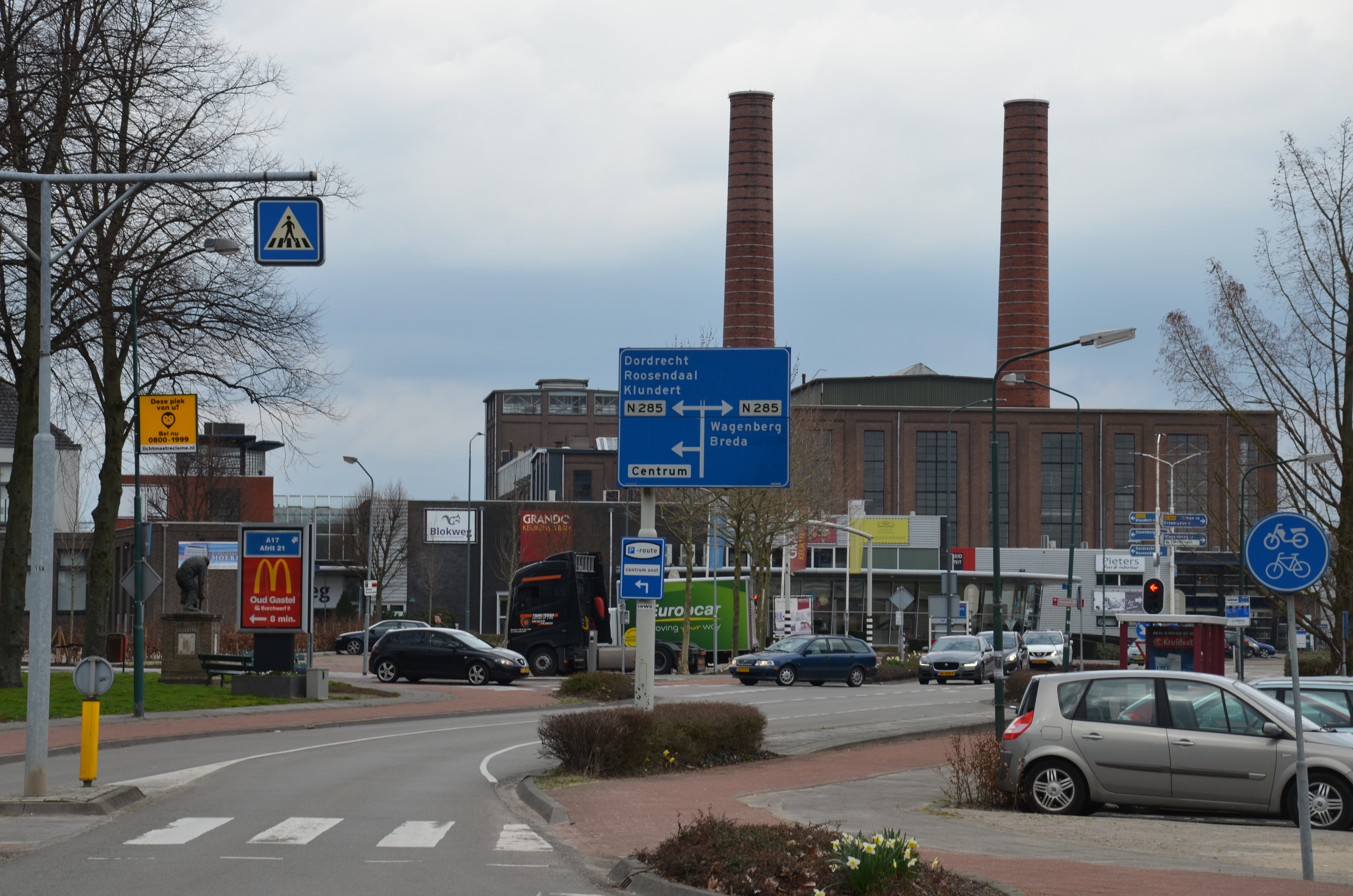
Industry in Zevenbergen
