= Haagse Beemden =

- District in Breda
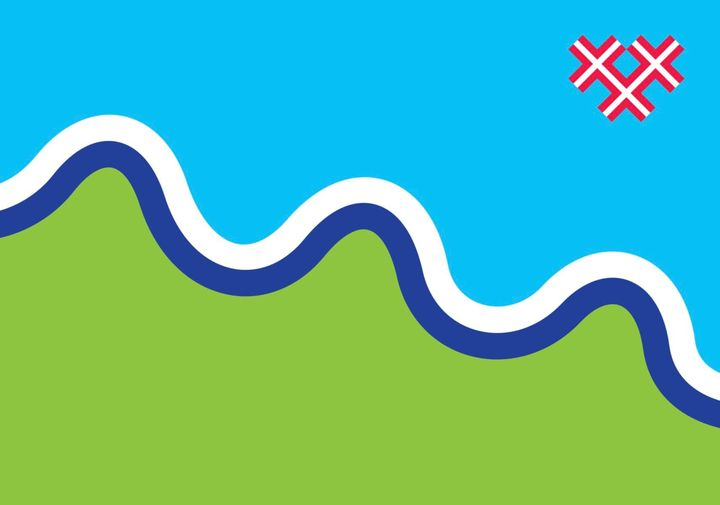
- Flag

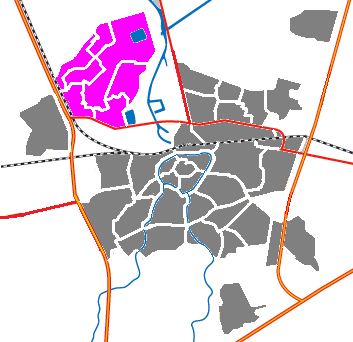

- Location in the province of North Brabant in the Netherlands Haagse Beemden (Netherlands)
- Coordinates: 51°37′13″N 4°43′58″E
- Country: Netherlands
- Province: North Brabant
- Municipality: Breda

Area
  - Total: 16.76 km^{2} (6.47 sq mi)

Population
  - Total: 27.000
  - Density: 1.611/km^{2} (4.172/sq mi)
- Time zone: UTC+1 (CET)
  - Summer (DST): UTC+2 (CEST)
- Postal code: 4822 - 4824
- Dialing code: 076

Haagse Beemden is a residential district in the city of Breda. It is a relatively new district in the northwest part of the city. With about 27,000 inhabitants living in 10,000 residence, Haagse Beemden is by far the biggest district in Breda.

== History ==
In 1975 the city of Breda acquired the status “Groeistad” (growing city) to attract people and businesses to move outside the Randstad. In connection with this, a large part of the municipality of Prinsenbeek was transferred to the municipality of Breda. (the part east of the motorway A16, with an area of 1,548 hectares). On these grounds the new Haagse Beemden was constructed. Which already was planned in 1958. The district was built in the 1980s and 1990s on both sides of the “Burgst” estate. This was later arranged as a park, in which historical elements such as the Chapel of “Gageldonk" and the “Kleine Hoeve” (Small Farmhouse) and “Grote Hoeve” (Large Farmhouse) have been preserved. Along the A16 lie the “Weimeren” nature reserve and recreational lake "De Kuil” (The Pit).

The area is much larger than the current urban area. In the north and the west there is a large meadow area of wet peat soils along the river Mark. The urban areas are mixed with the landscape.

== Name ==
Beemd (Meadows) are moist grasslands that were used as pasture and hayfields close to a village. The name of the district is a reference to the former “Beemden” in the north part of the former municipality of Princenhage on which ground the district was built. The Hedge (Haag) surrounding the hunting grounds of the lords of Breda are mentioned in the prefix “Haagse”.

== Neighborhoods ==
The Haagse Beemden consists of nine neighborhoods:

- Asterd
- Heksenwiel
- Kesteren
- Kievitsloop
- Gageldonk
- De Kroeten
- Overkroeten
- Muizenberg
- Paradijs

== Facilities ==
In the neighborhoods are shopping areas, elementary and primary schools, schools for secondary education and community centre's. In addition to that there are sports facilities such as, three football (soccer) clubs, two tennis clubs and a multi sports hall and two scouts clubs.

== Events ==
- Annually the Haagse Beemden Loop (Haagse Beemden Run) is held with distances of 5, 10 and 15 km. Sinds 2014 there also is an obstacle run added.
- As in more Dutch neighborhoods and cities, they keep the annual Avondvierdaagse. A walking marche ment for children in primary school, walking 4 evenings in a row distances of 5 and 10 km.
- Since 2022 there is the Haagse Beemden Festival. A weekend of celebrations and community games started with the 45th anniversary of the district.

=== Carnaval ===
During carnival, the district is one of the few districts in Breda which has its own “Prince Carnaval” and a nickname, “Giegeldonk” (Giggle Dunc).

== Flag ==
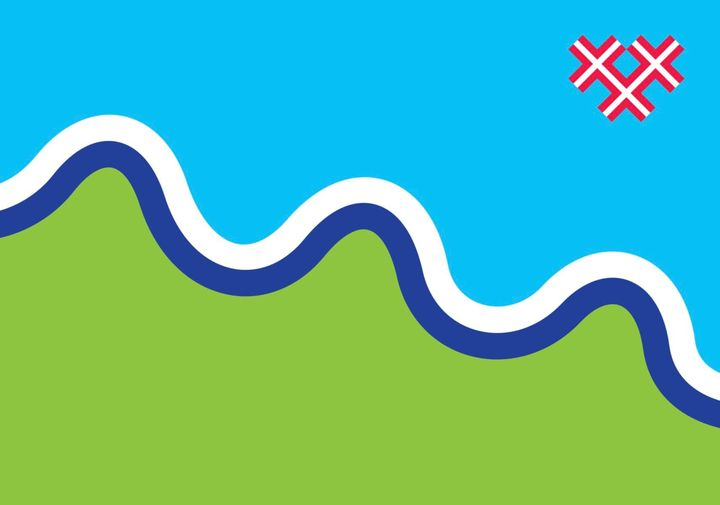
Flag of Haagse Beemden

The district has its own flag since 2022. The residents of the Haagse Beemden represented in the volunteer group “Haagse Beemden Verbindt” (Haagse Beemden Connects) took the initiative to organize a design contest. The winning design was by “Hein de Vree”. The designer explains;

- The wavy line symbolizes the somewhat sloping landscape of the district.
- The dark blue line represents the winding water in the district.
- The white line follows the blue line, just like the roads in the district often follow the natural water.
- The light blue is the radiant blue sky above the Haagse Beemden.
- In the upper right corner, the three Andreas crosses from the city coat of arms of the municipality of Breda.
- The light colors are the refreshing aspect of the neighbourhood.

The flag was presented on June 11, 2022, during the first edition of the Haagse Beemden Festival, in the presence of the Breda mayor Paul Depla.

== Transport ==
- There is a large cycle path network in the Haage Beemden. This network is connected to a larger network of cycle paths through the city and this network is connected to a larger network of cycle paths with the neighboring municipality’s.
- The district can be reached by public transport, bus line 2 and 4 from the central station of Breda as well as by train through the Breda-Prinsenbeek railway station in the west part of the district.
- By road the Haagse Beemden is connected to motorway A16/E19 from Rotterdam to Antwerp.
- The river Mark connects the industrial areas, Emer and Krochten with the Wilhelmina Canal and the Volkerak. Also recreational boats make their way to Breda through the Mark waters.
- In the far north of the meadow area, a little ferry "'t Markpontje" transfers cyclists en pedestrians across the Mark to the village of Terheijden.
