= Ochten =

- Village
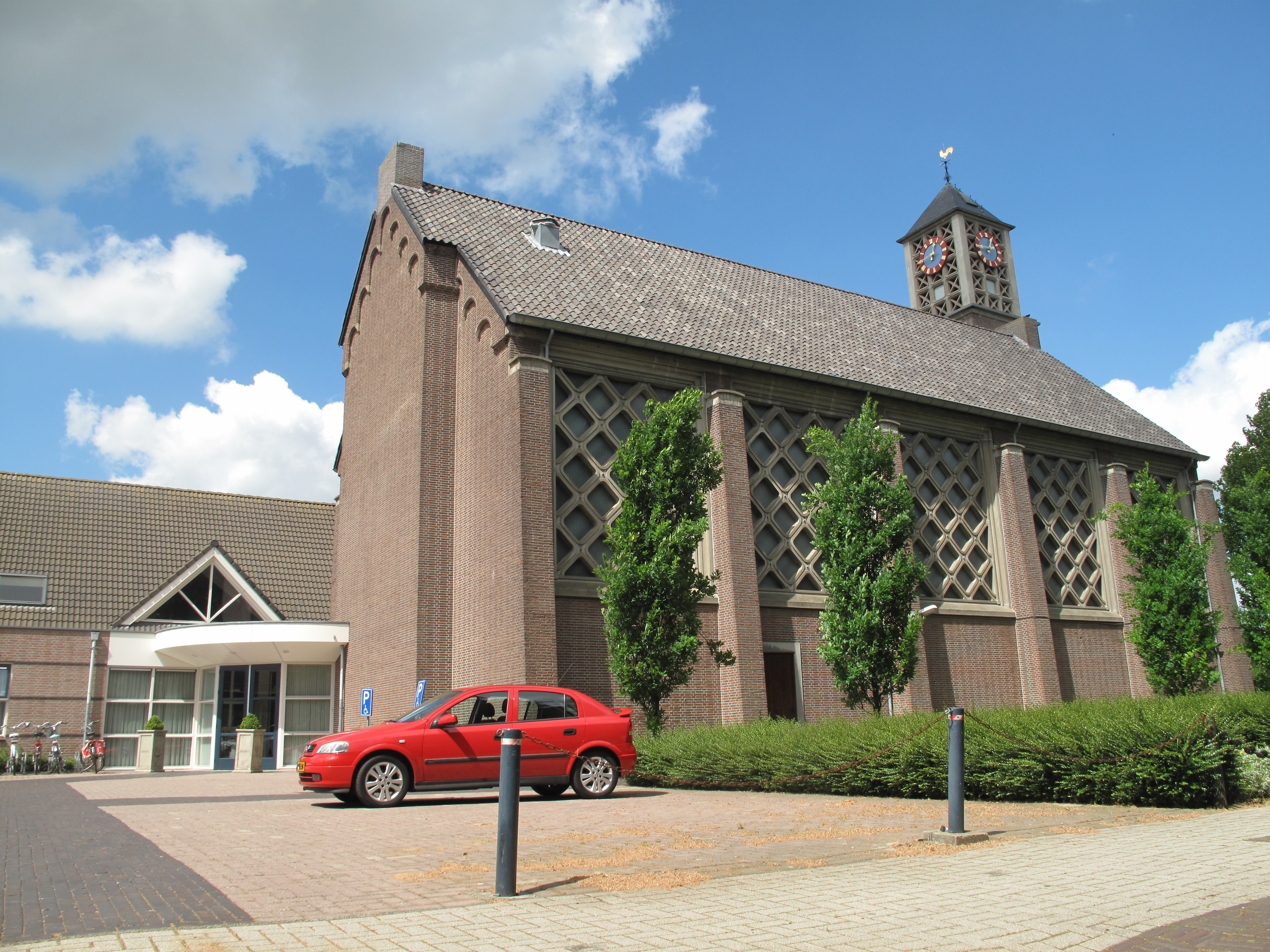
- Church of Ochten

- Location in the Netherlands Ochten (Netherlands)
- Coordinates: 51°54′28″N 5°34′4″E
- Country: Netherlands
- Province: Gelderland
- Municipality: Neder-Betuwe

Area
  - Total: 11.52 km^{2} (4.45 sq mi)
- Elevation: 7 m (23 ft)

Population (2021)
  - Total: 5,050
  - Density: 438/km^{2} (1,140/sq mi)
- Time zone: UTC+1 (CET)
  - Summer (DST): UTC+2 (CEST)
- Postal code: 4051
- Dialing code: 0344

Ochten (Dutch pronunciation: [ˈɔxtə(n)]) is a village in the Dutch province of Gelderland. It is a part of the municipality of Neder-Betuwe, and lies about 10 km southwest of Wageningen.

Ochten was a separate municipality until 1818, when it was divided into two parts, Echteld and IJzendoorn.

== History ==
It was first mentioned in the late 9th century as "in uilla Ovtun". The etymology is unclear. Ochten developed along the Waal River. It was an heerlijkheid of the Prince-Bishop of Utrecht until 1402 when it changed hands to the Duchy of Gelre. In 1712, it became a possession of Hohenzollern-Sigmaringen. In 1840, it was home to 820 people.

In September 1944, Ochten became a battleground between the Germans and the Allies. Not a single houses remained undamaged, and more than half of the 400 buildings were damaged beyond repair. The emergency houses would continue to be used until 1973. In 1995, the dike was about the break during high water. The entire village was evacuated and the army was called in to strengthen the dike. The entire embankment was later renewed and strengthened.

== Gallery ==
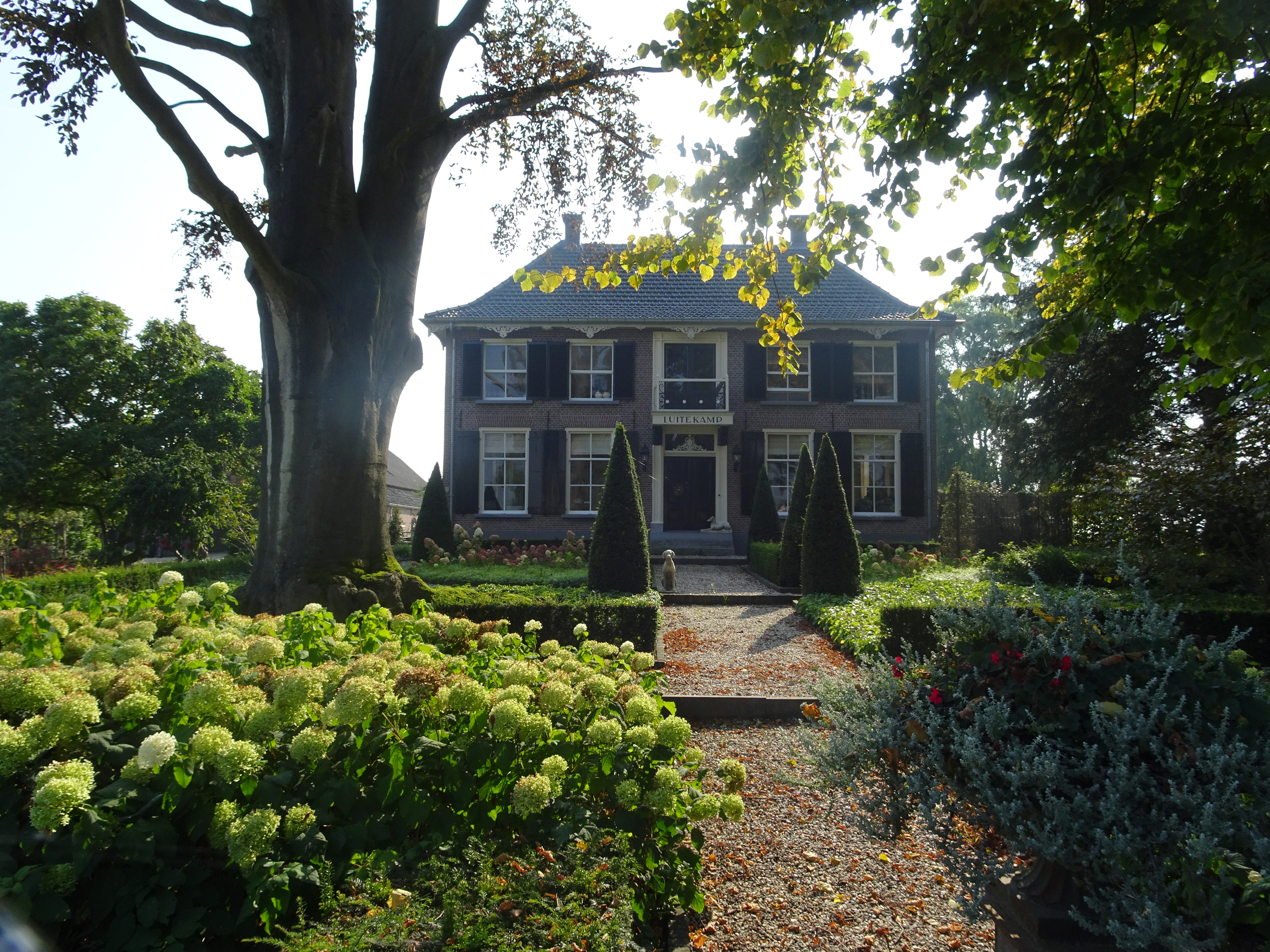
Villa Luitekamp

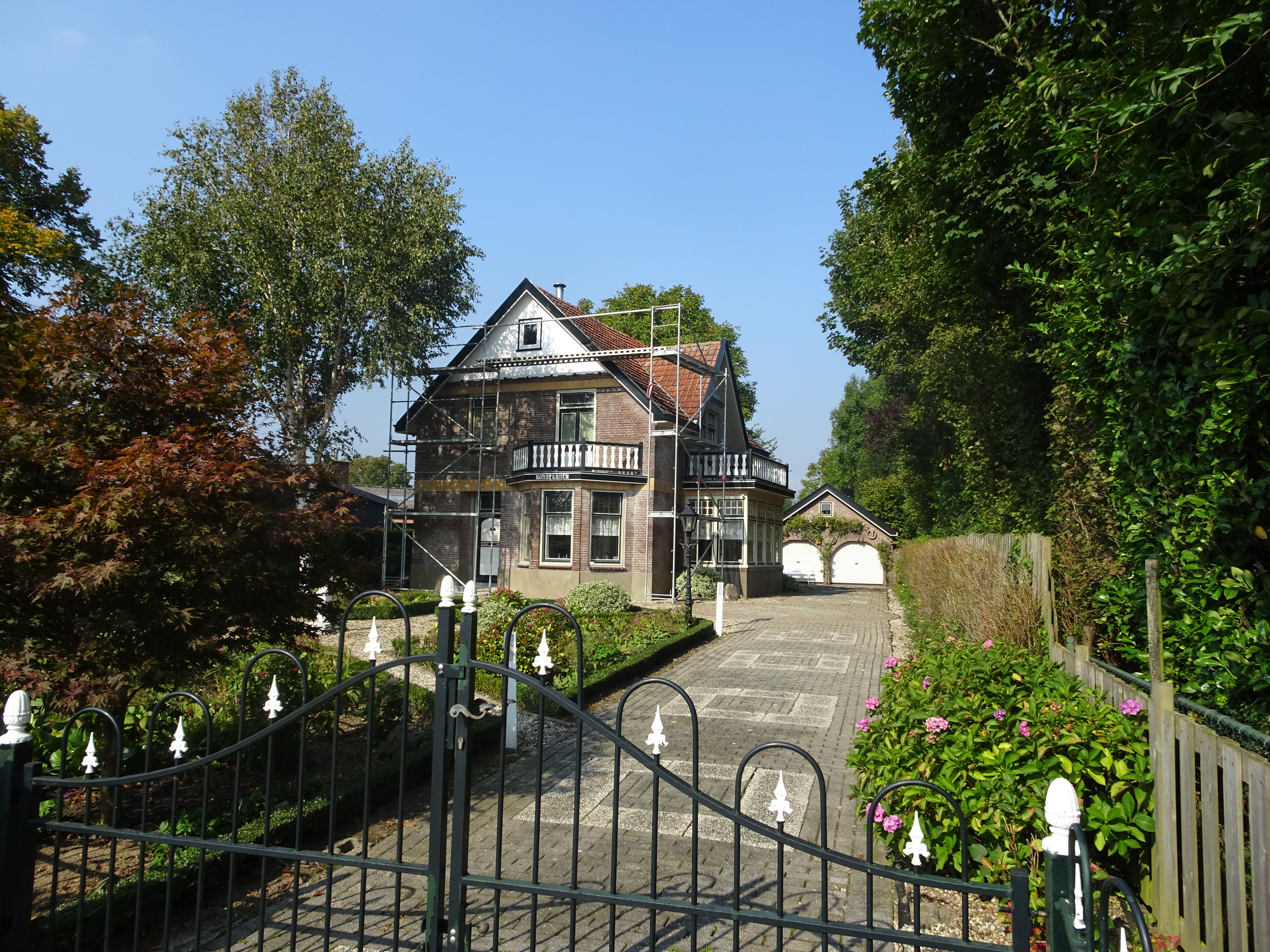
Villa Sonnevanck

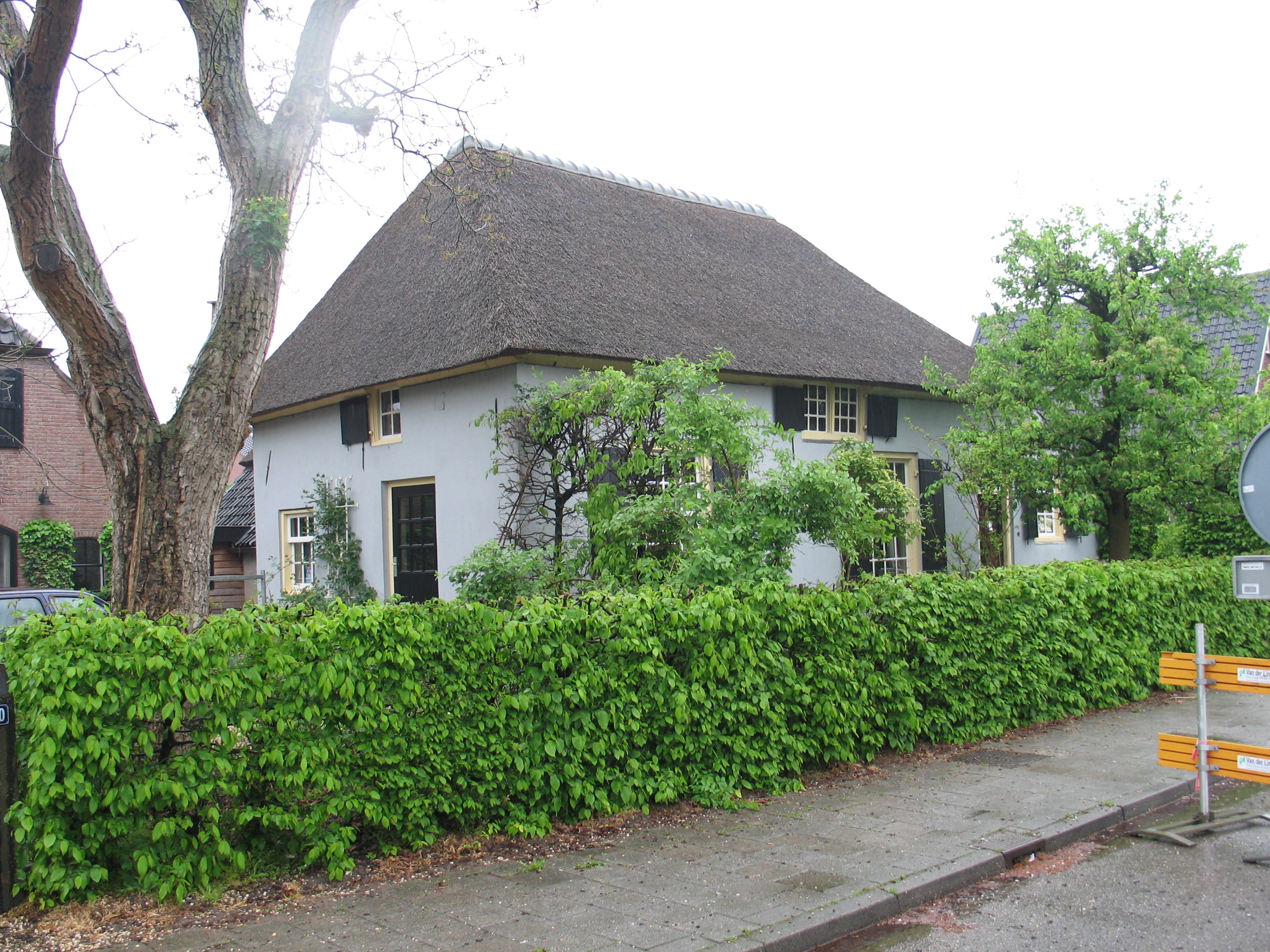
Farm in Ochten

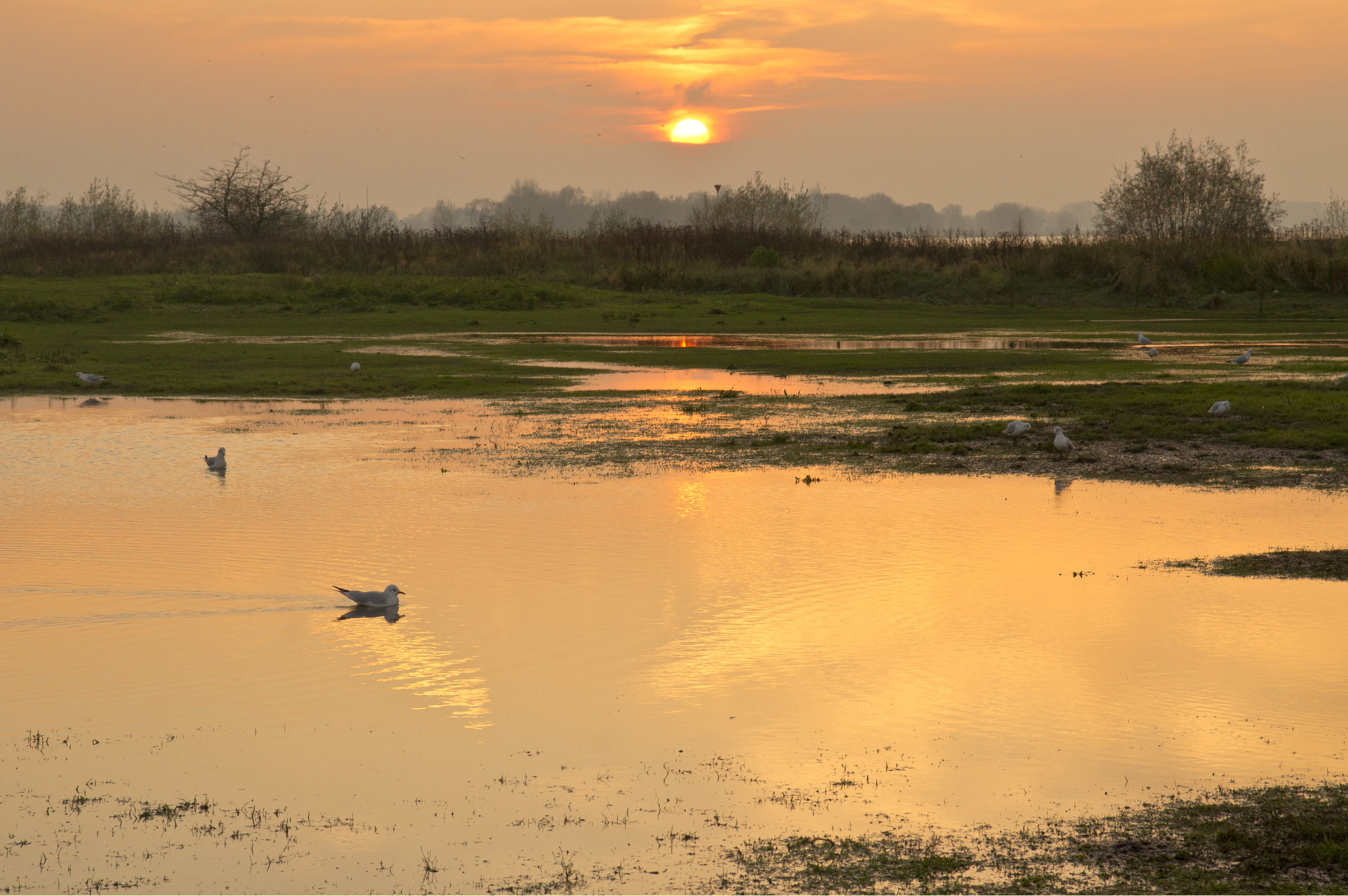
Sunset on the Waal near Ochten
