= Opheusden =

- Village
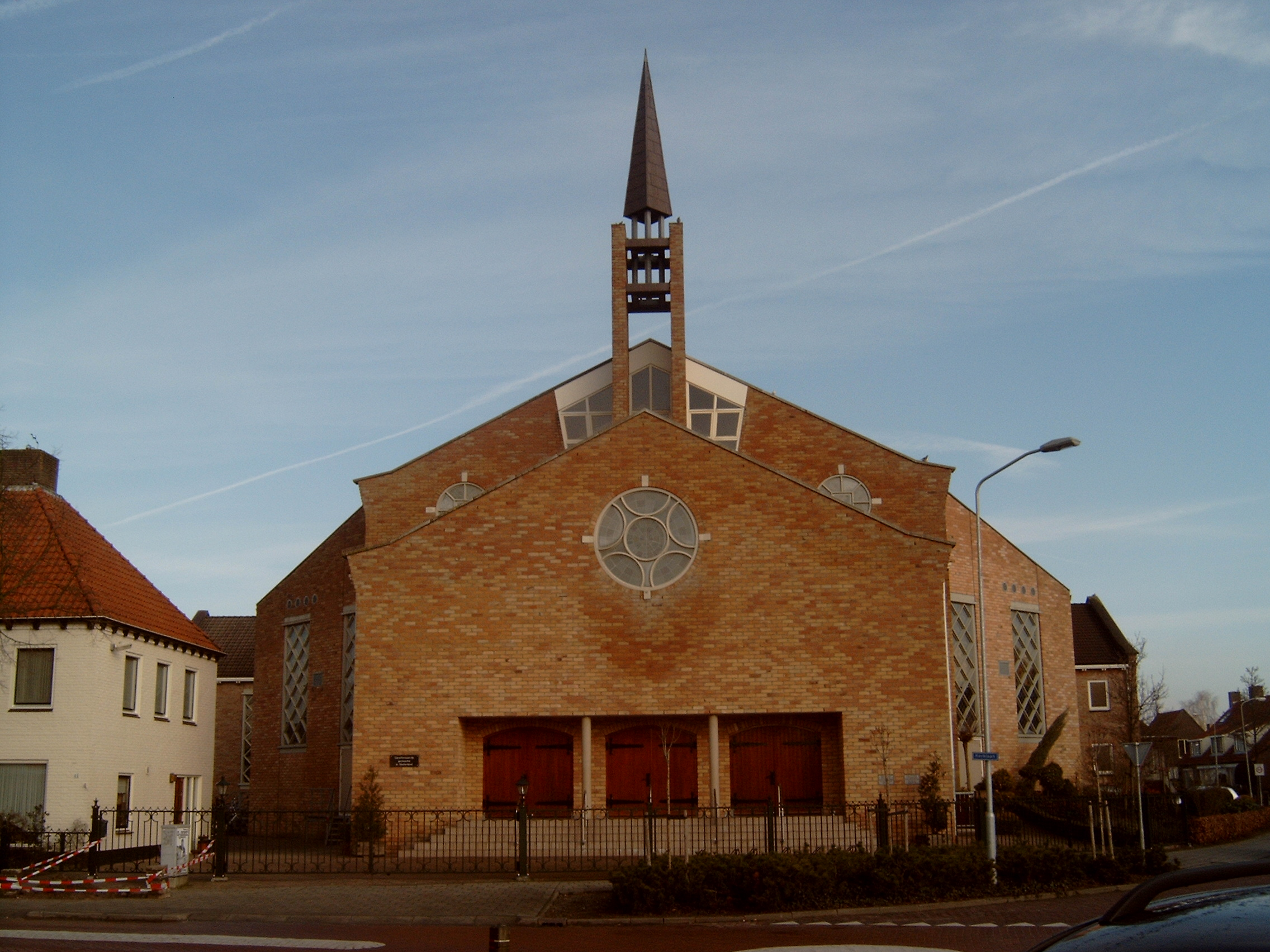
- This 2850-seater church in Opheusden is the largest in the Netherlands

- Location in the Netherlands Opheusden (Netherlands)
- Coordinates: 51°55′59″N 5°37′47″E
- Country: Netherlands
- Province: Gelderland
- Municipality: Neder-Betuwe

Area
  - Total: 2.2 km^{2} (0.85 sq mi)

Population (1 January 2018)
  - Total: 5,630
  - Density: 2,600/km^{2} (6,600/sq mi)
- Time zone: UTC+1 (CET)
  - Summer (DST): UTC+2 (CEST)

Opheusden (Dutch pronunciation: [ɔpˈɦøːzdə(n)]) is a village in the Dutch province of Gelderland. It is a part of the municipality of Neder-Betuwe, and lies some 5 km south-west of Wageningen.

Opheusden (or "Heusden", as it was known then) was a separate municipality until 1818, when it was merged with Kesteren.

The town was devastated in October 1944 during the failed German counterattack against the Nijmegen salient after Operation Market Garden had failed.

The Opheusden statistical area, which includes the village centre, its outskirts, and the surrounding countryside, covers an area of 220 hectares. It had a resident population on 1 January 2018 of 5,630, living in 1,960 households. The built-up area of the village covers 73 hectares.

The municipality of Opheusden and the surrounding region is well known for the about 150 tree nurseries specialised in ornamental trees. The production area in the Opheusden region is about 1500 hectares.

== Transport ==
- Opheusden is served by a railway station on the Elst to Dordrecht line.

== Gallery ==
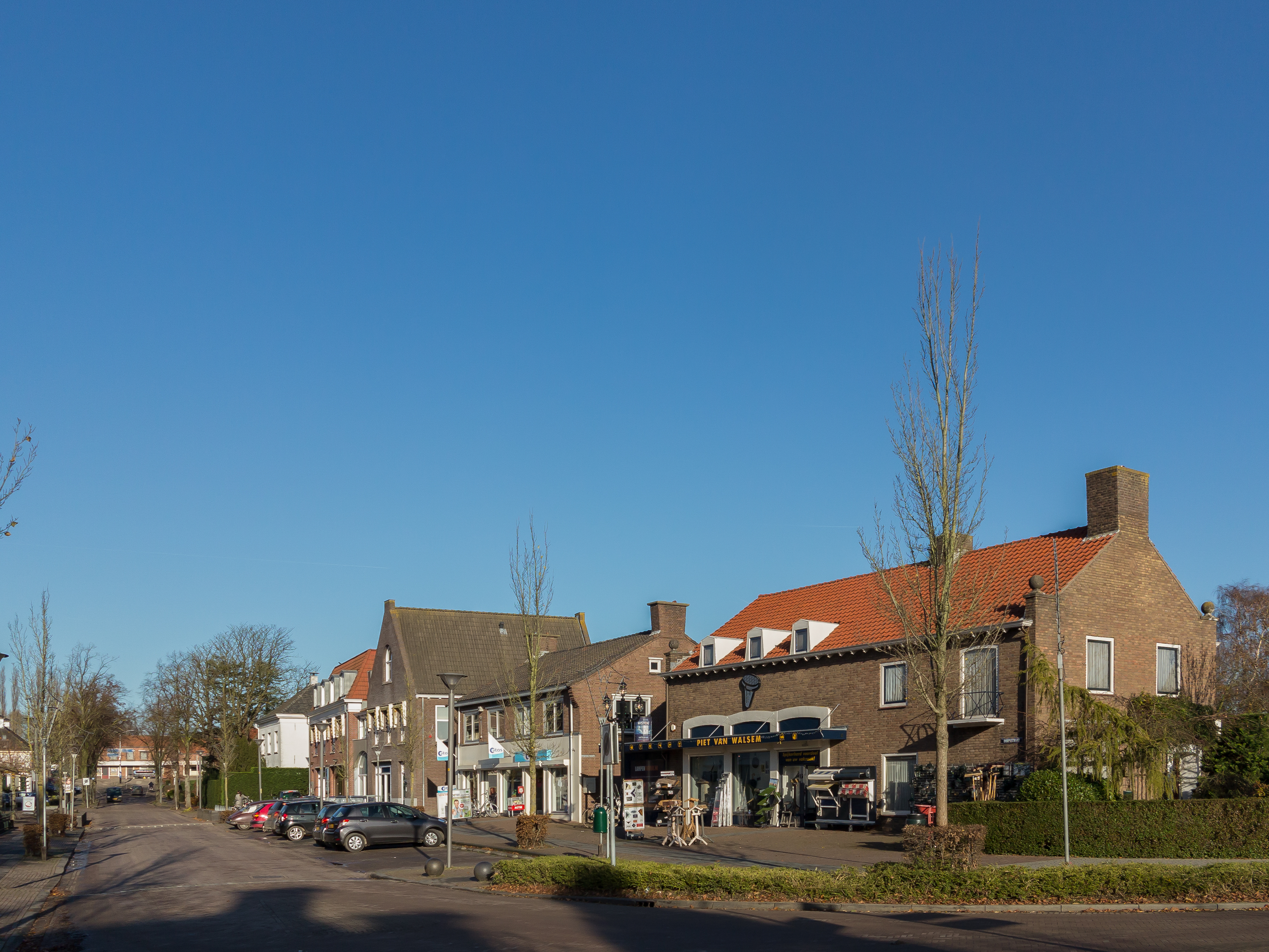
A view of Dorpsstraat in Opheusden

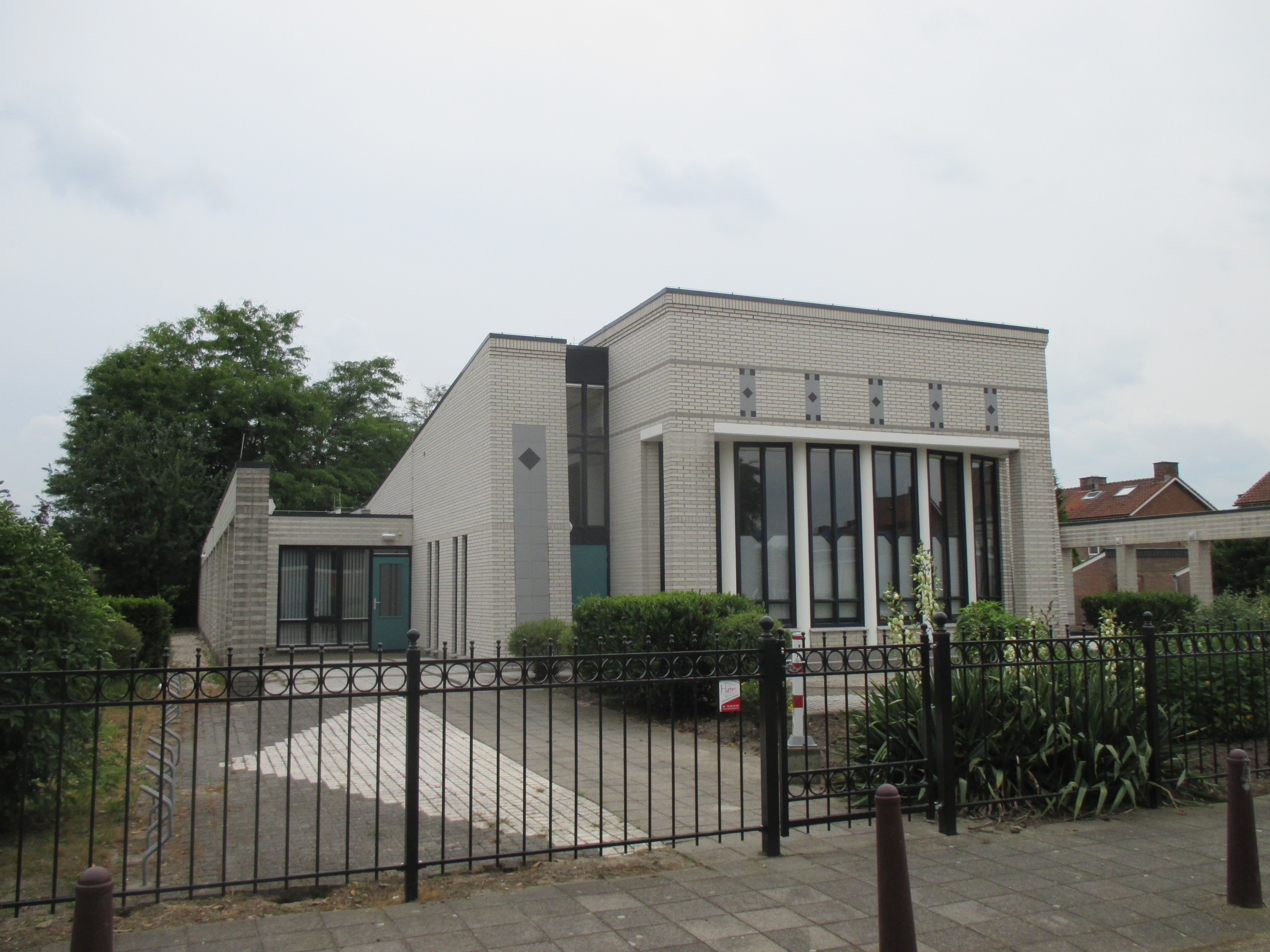
Moluccan Pniel Church

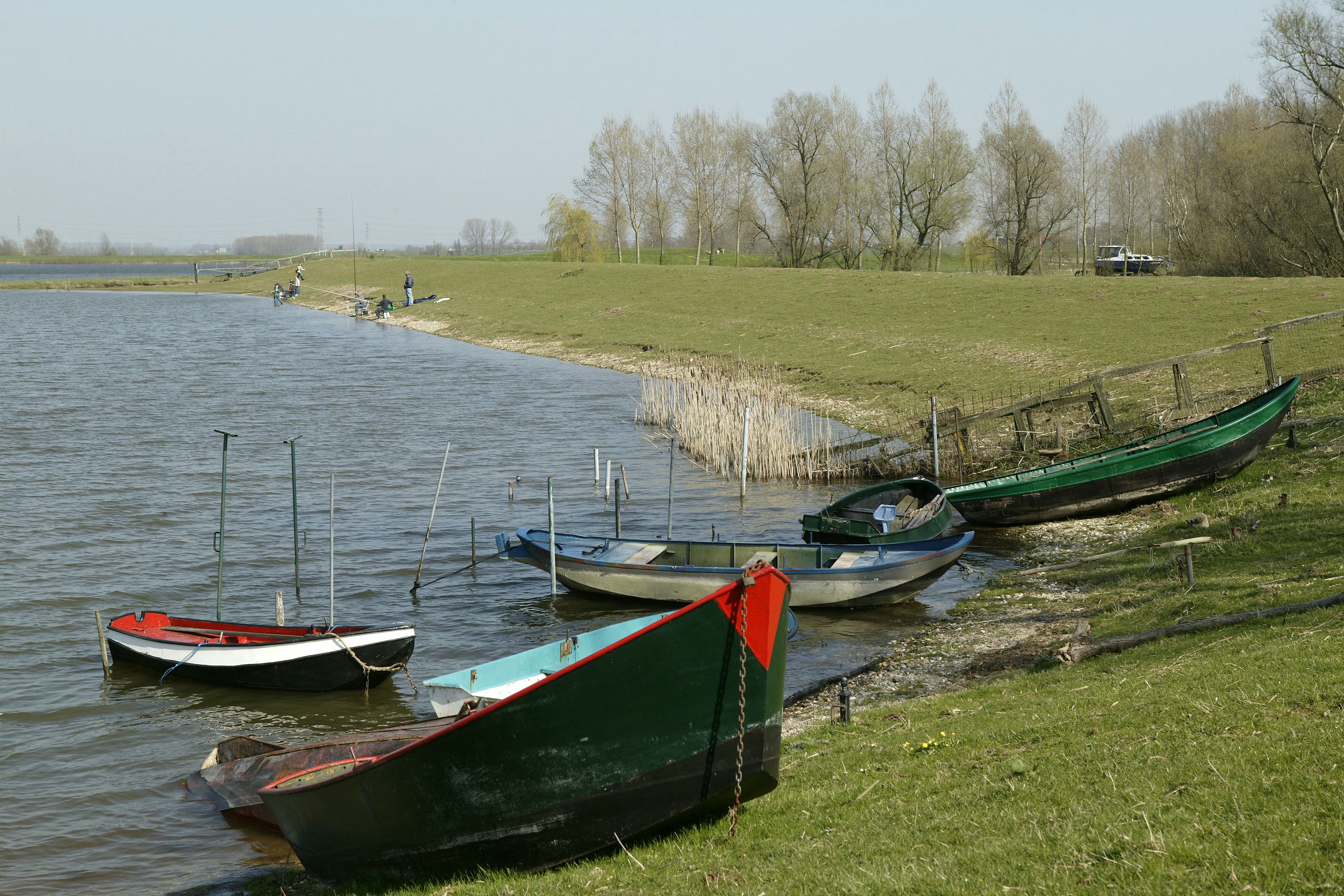
Boats along the river

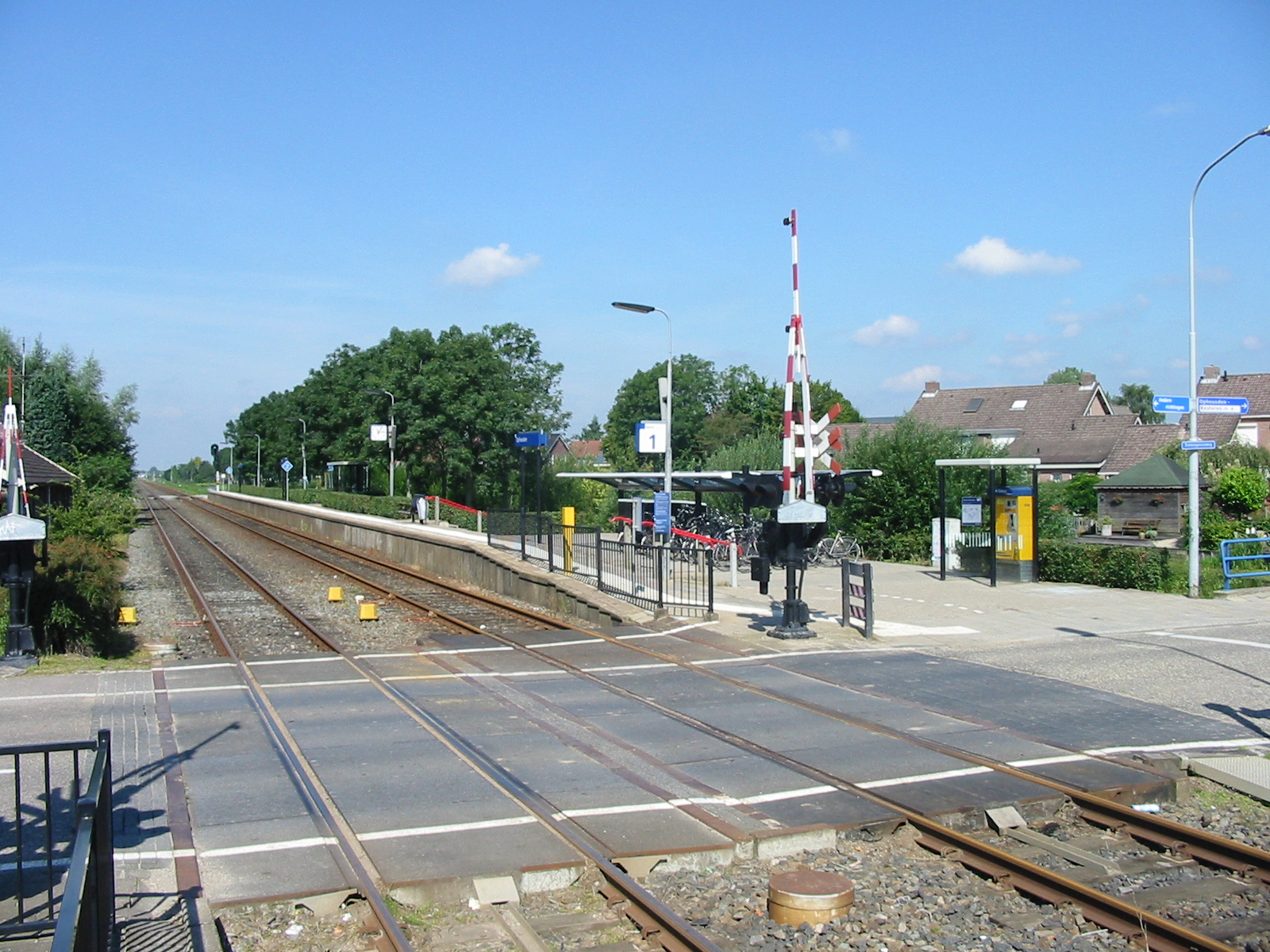
Railway station
