= Neder-Betuwe =

- Municipality
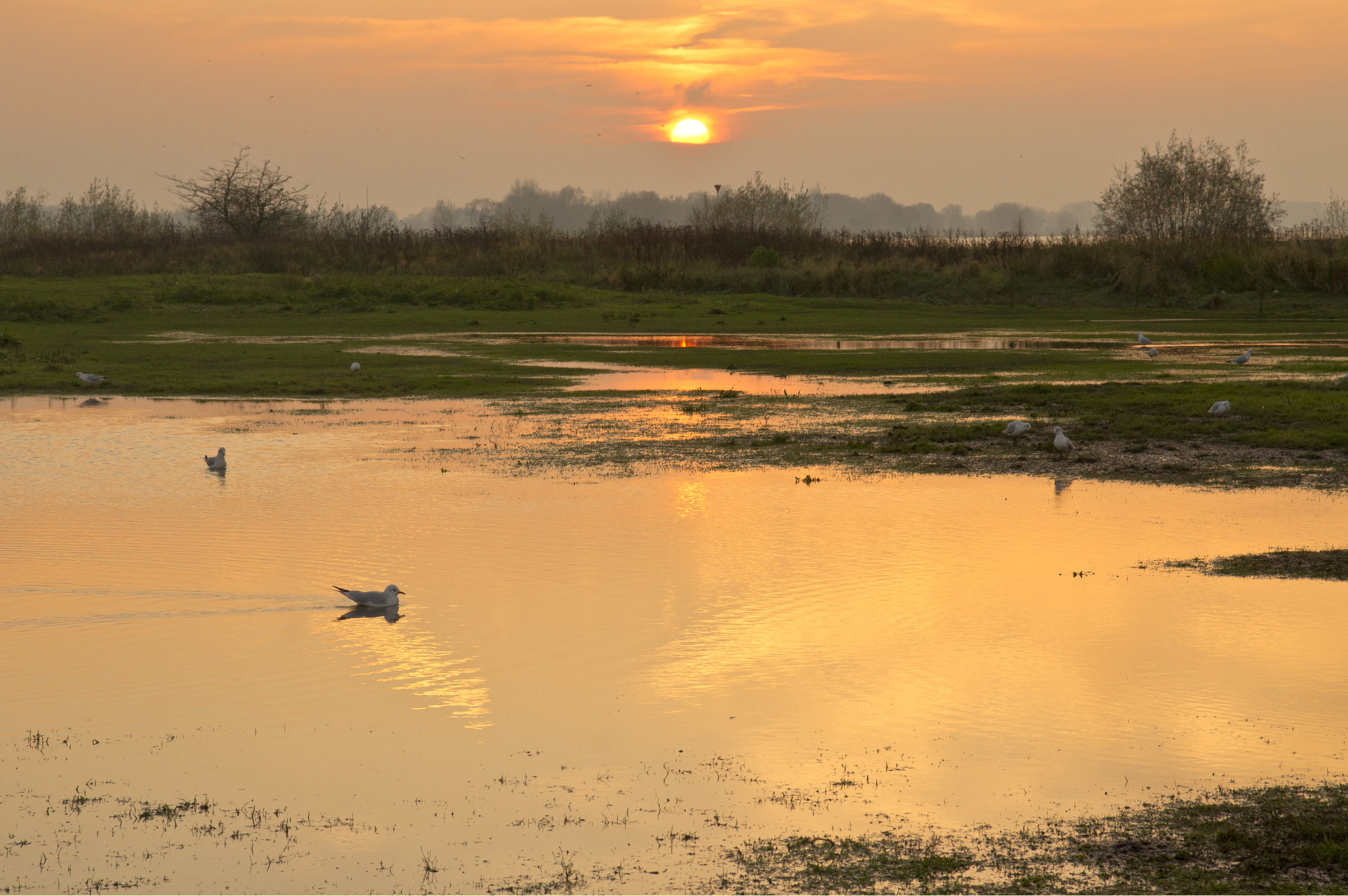
- Waal (river) near Ochten

- Flag Coat of arms

- Location in Gelderland
- Coordinates: 51°56′N 5°38′E
- Country: Netherlands
- Province: Gelderland

Government
  - Body: Municipal council
  - Mayor: Jan Kottelenberg (CDA)

Area
  - Total: 67.46 km^{2} (26.05 sq mi)
  - Land: 59.98 km^{2} (23.16 sq mi)
  - Water: 7.48 km^{2} (2.89 sq mi)
- Elevation: 7 m (23 ft)

Population (January 2021)
  - Total: 24,648
  - Density: 411/km^{2} (1,060/sq mi)
- Time zone: UTC+1 (CET)
  - Summer (DST): UTC+2 (CEST)
- Postcode: 4040–4054, 6669
- Area code: 0344, 0488
- Website: www.nederbetuwe.nl

Neder-Betuwe (pronounced [ˌneːdər ˈbeːtyu.ə]) is a municipality in the province of Gelderland, in the east of the Netherlands. On 1 April 2003, it was established as the new name of the redivided municipality of Kesteren. Neder-Betuwe had 25,042 inhabitants on 1 January 2022.

== History ==
Archaeological excavations have found remains dating back to the Stone Age and Iron Age, although it is not known if the area was permanently inhabited. The Neder-Betuwe area is along the northernmost border or limes of the Roman Empire. Evidence suggests that a Roman fort (Castra) was maintained where the town of Kesteren now is.

Around 1300 the first dikes were put up to protect the inhabitants and agricultural lands from flooding.

Most churches are reformed; there are no Catholic churches in the Neder-Betuwe area. The eastern municipal border also marks an invisible religious border: to the east a considerable part of the population is Catholic. This can be explained by the presence of a dike called the Spanjaardsdijk or Spaniards Dike which was built before or during the Eighty Years' War. The local ruler was Protestant, the rulers to the east were Catholic.

During World War II the area saw a lot of fighting. During the German invasion in May 1940 the area was attacked since it was on the southern flank of the attack towards the Grebbeberg. In September 1944 the area again came under fire during and after operation Market Garden. The narrowest part of the Betuwe became the western front of the allied bridgehead in the area. Opheusden was ruined because of the constant fighting between the Germans and the 101st Airborne Division and later British forces and the 1st Belgian Infantry Brigade. Ochten was flattened by British forces using artillery and mortars from south of the Waal.

In February 1995, Ochten received international media attention because of a weakened dike after a prolonged period of high waterlevels in the rivers. This situation and the state of other dikes forced 250,000 people in this region to evacuate. The river levels had been unusually high for almost two months, reaching record heights during the first days of February. Although the dike started to shift, a huge rescue operation managed to stabilize the dike. Several months later the already planned strengthening of the dike started with almost no opposition. Some people who opposed the strengthening before the evacuation, mainly because of NIMBYism, were harassed by some locals.

== Geography ==
The municipal boundaries are for a large part defined by the river Waal to the south, the river Rhine to the North and the Amsterdam-Rhine Canal to the west. Because of the location between the two rivers the area is as narrow as 3 km (2 mi) near Opheusden. The area is basically a polder, dikes protect the former floodplain from flooding. Since it was a floodplain the area is relatively flat and the soil is mainly clay with layers of sand and gravel underneath.

=== Topography ===
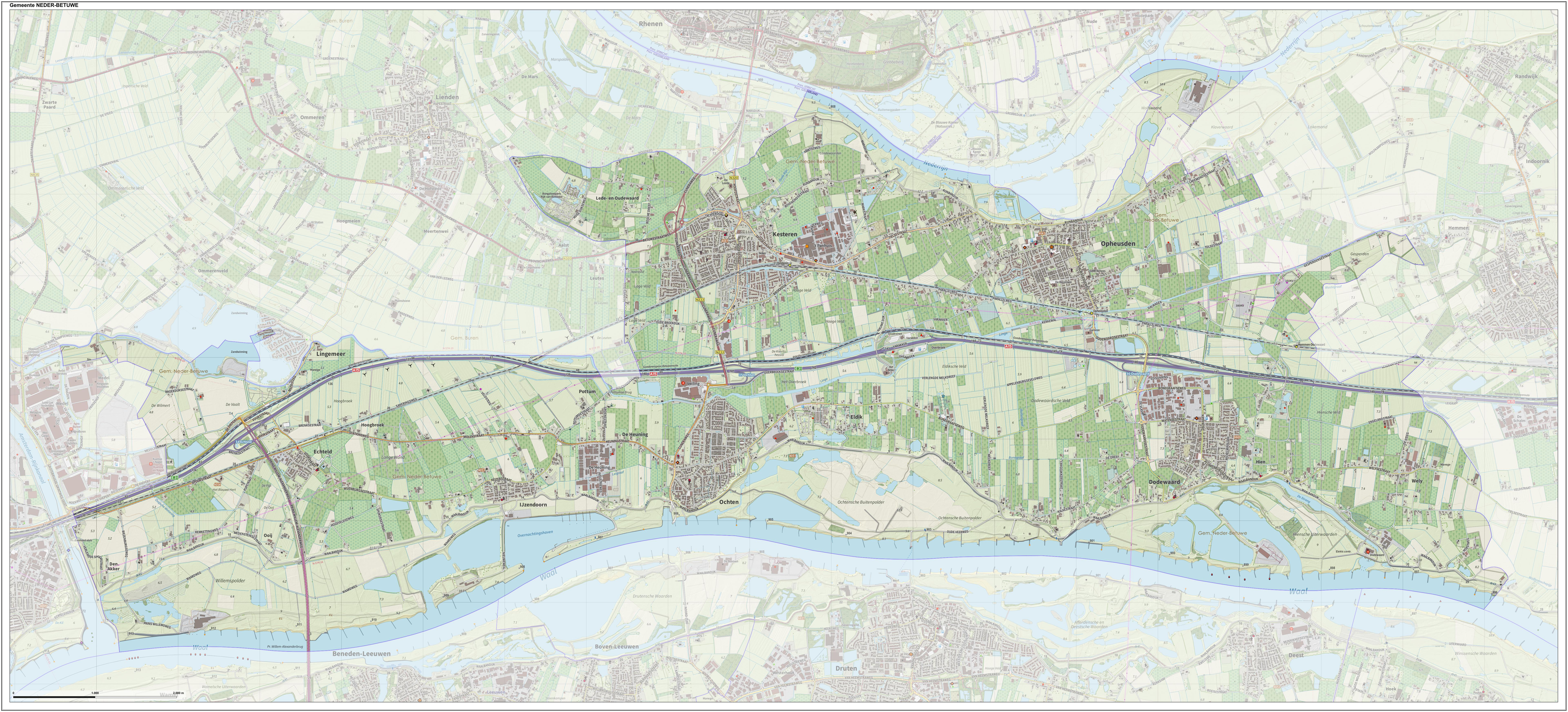

Dutch Topographic map of the municipality of Neder-Betuwe, June 2015

=== Population centres ===
- Dodewaard
- Echteld
- IJzendoorn
- Kesteren
- Ochten
- Opheusden

== Transport ==
The highway A15 runs east to west through Neder-Betuwe. A provincial road crosses the Rhine near Kesteren and another provincial road crosses the Waal near Echteld. A railway line through the area was built in 1882, connecting Geldermalsen and Amersfoort to Nijmegen. A new dedicated freight railway line called the Betuweroute was opened on June 16, 2007. This line connects the port of Rotterdam to Germany and beyond. A ferry operates a service across the Rhine between Opheusden and Wageningen. During summer months a small ferry transports people between Dodewaard and Druten, mainly tourists, across the river Waal as part of several recreational bicycle routes.

== Economy ==
The local economy runs mostly on agriculture (fruit plantations and tree nurseries) and some factories. The economy blossomed after the completion of the railway line through the area making it possible to transport fresh fruit. A considerable part of the local population works outside the municipal boundaries.

=== Power plant ===
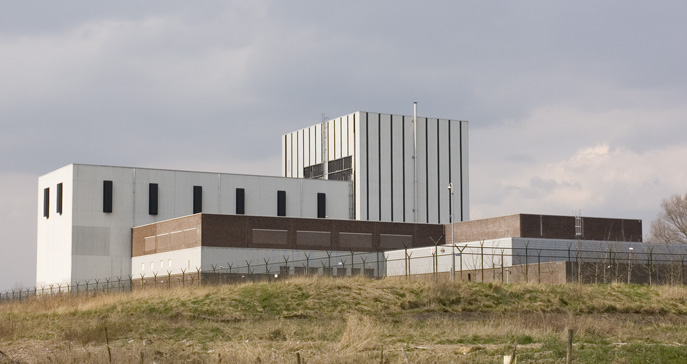
Dodewaard nuclear power plant awaiting demolition.

In Dodewaard, the Dodewaard nuclear power plant with a boiling water reactor has been decommissioned. It was operational in the period 1968-1997. It had a capacity of 58 MW.

In 2003 the last fissionable material was removed. Parts of the plant were demolished, the main building is in a 40-year waiting period of "safe enclosure" from 2005-2045, before being demolished. The main source of radioactivity is cobalt-60 with a half-life of 5.27 years, hence it is reduced by a factor 193 in 40 years. Waiting longer is not as effective, since at that time the main source of radioactivity will become nickel-63 with a half-life of 100.1 years.

The spent uranium and the uranium left when operation was discontinued were transported to BNFL in Sellafield for nuclear reprocessing.

See also nuclear reactors in the Netherlands.

== Notable people ==
- Arie van Lent (born 1970 in Opheusden) a Dutch former footballer with 436 club caps
- Renger van der Zande (born 1986 in Dodewaard) a Dutch race-car driver
- Navarone Foor (born 1992 in Opheusden) a Dutch footballer with over 230 club caps

== Gallery ==
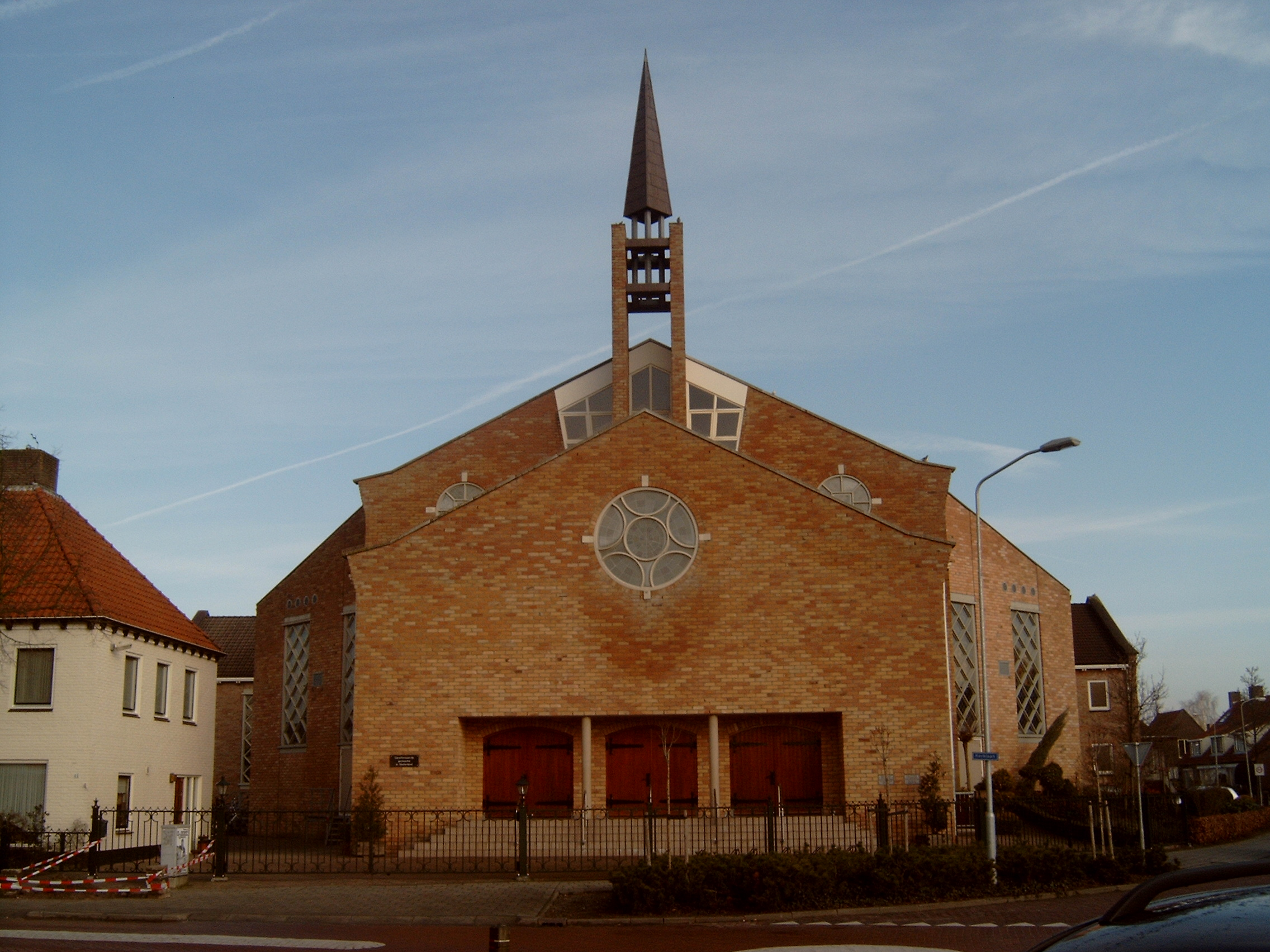
Opheusden, kerk

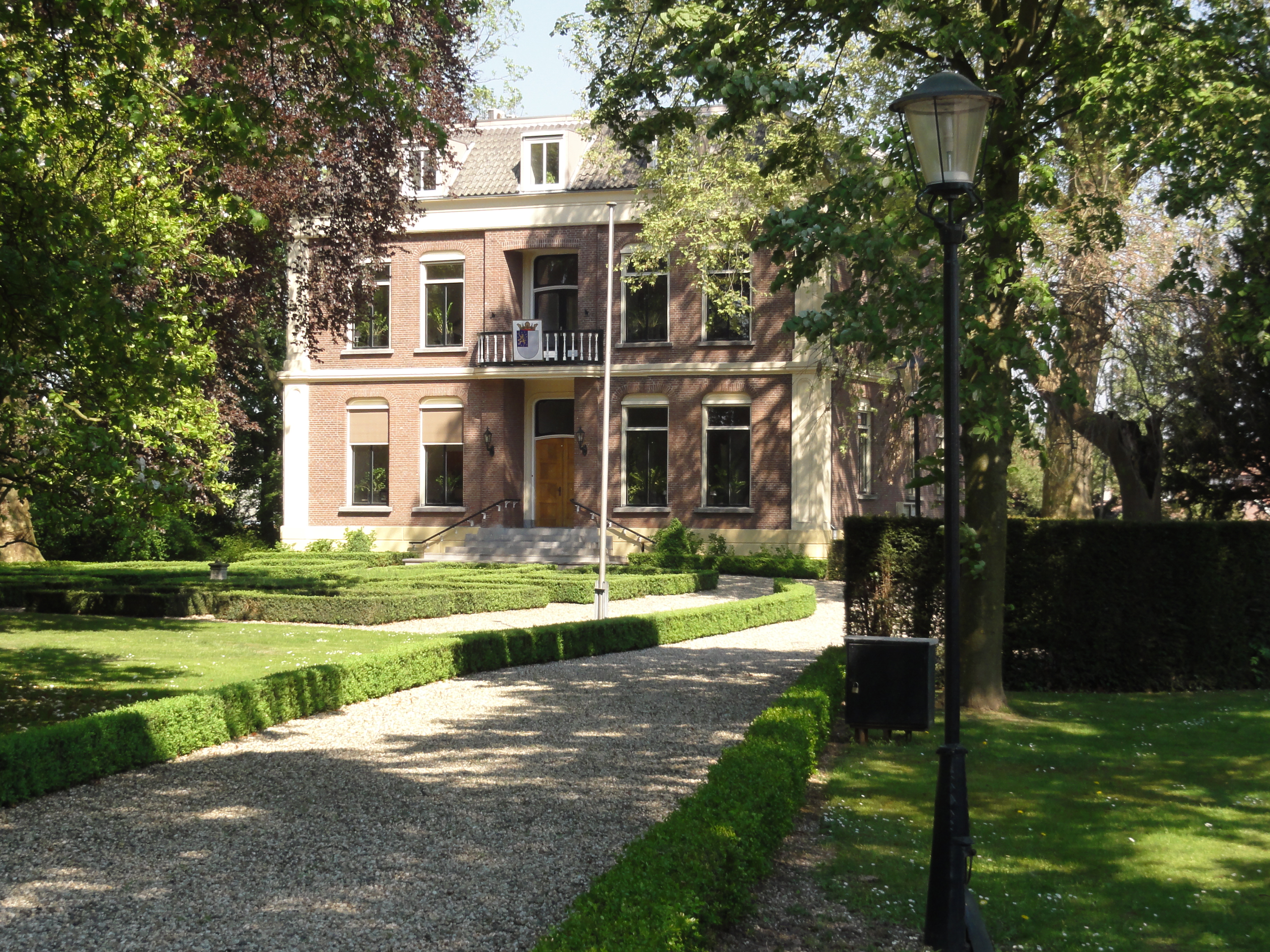
Dodewaard, voormalig gemeentehuis

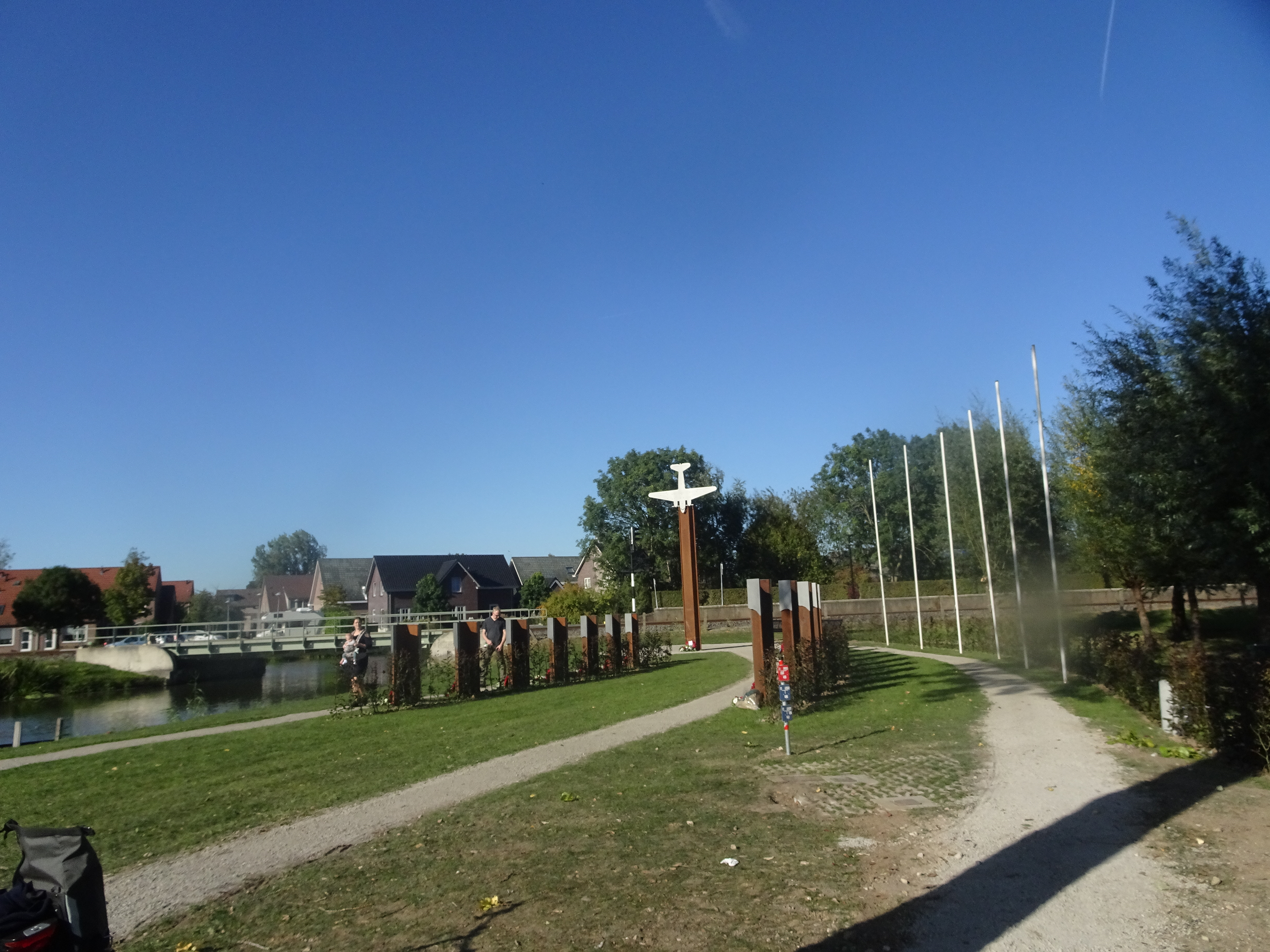
Vliegers-in-het-vuur overzicht

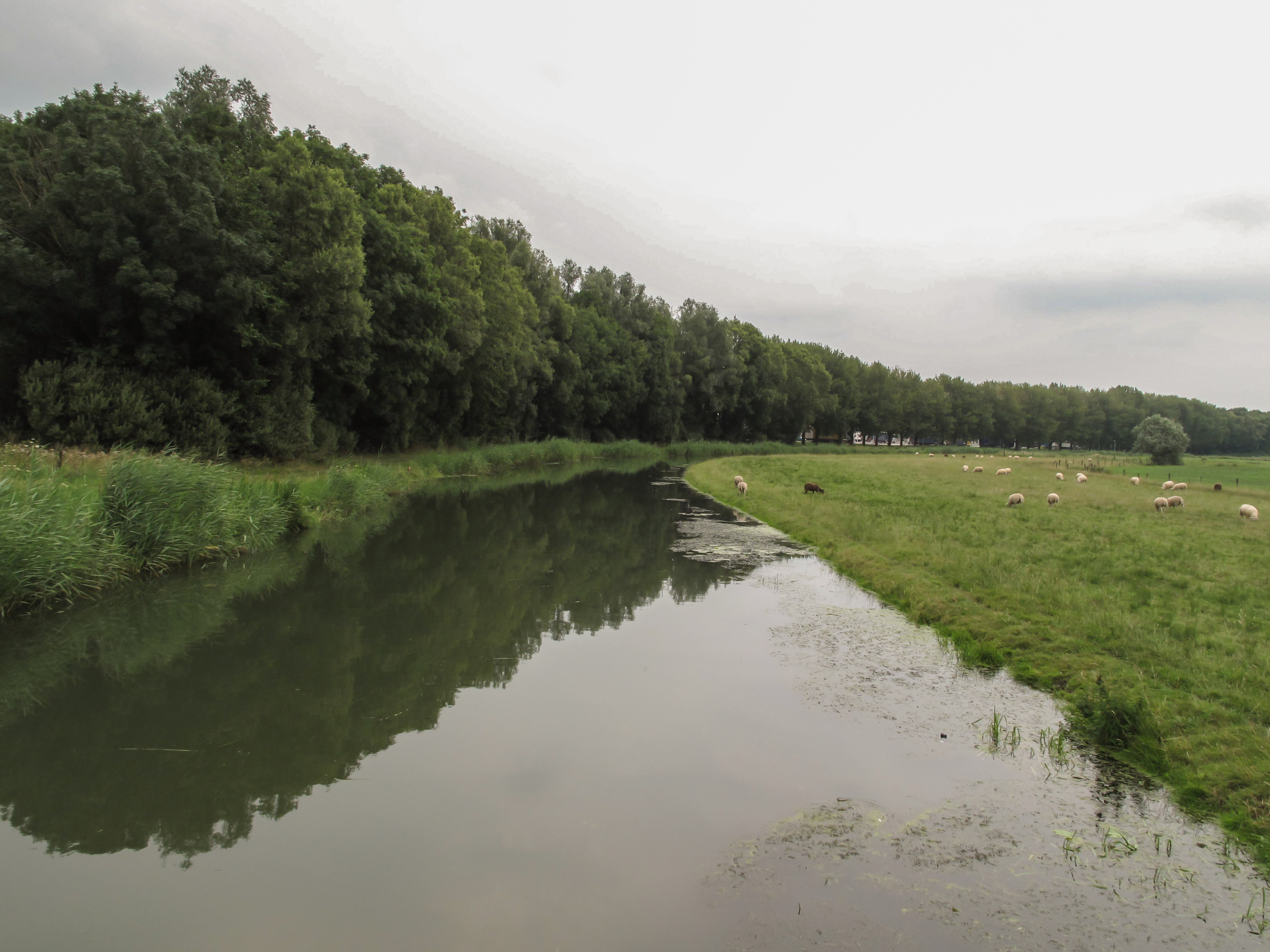
Bij Eldik, de Linge
