= IJzendoorn =

- Village
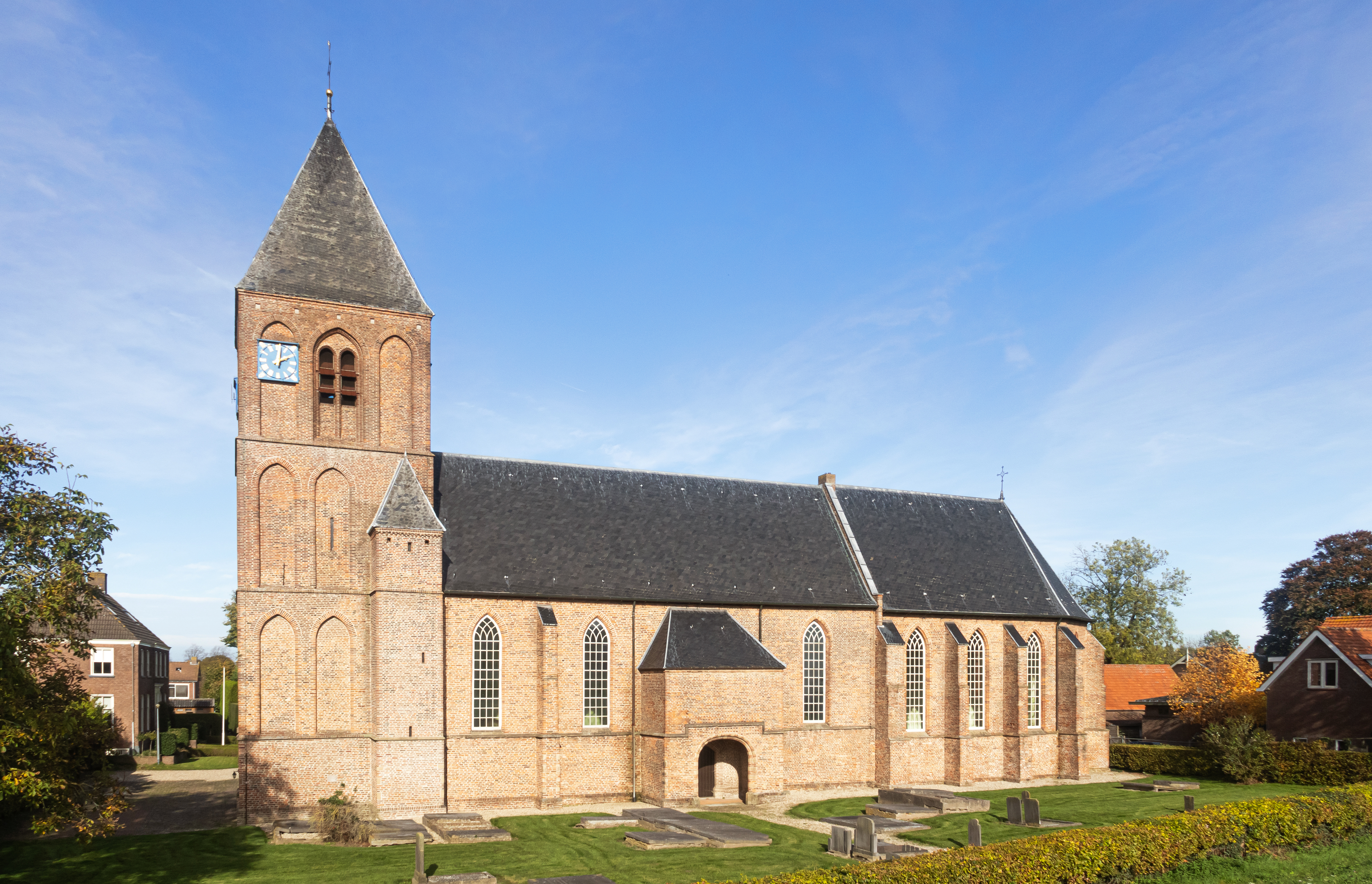
- Church of IJzendoorn

- Coat of arms

- Location in the Netherlands IJzendoorn (Netherlands)
- Coordinates: 51°54′23″N 5°31′59″E
- Country: Netherlands
- Province: Gelderland
- Municipality: Neder-Betuwe

Area
  - Total: 6.16 km^{2} (2.38 sq mi)
- Elevation: 6 m (20 ft)

Population (2021)
  - Total: 1,085
  - Density: 176/km^{2} (456/sq mi)
- Time zone: UTC+1 (CET)
  - Summer (DST): UTC+2 (CEST)
- Postal code: 4053
- Dialing code: 0344

IJzendoorn (Dutch pronunciation: [ˈɛi̯zəndoːr(ə)n]) is a village in the Dutch province of Gelderland. It is a part of the municipality of Neder-Betuwe, and lies about 8 km east of Tiel.

IJzendoorn was a separate municipality between 1818 and 1923, when it was merged with Echteld.

== History ==
It was first mentioned between 850 and 865 as Maandra. The etymology is unknown. The village developed along the Waal River. The Dutch Reformed Church dates from the 14th century, and the tower from the 15th century. The church and tower were severely damaged during World War II. The restoration was completed in 1955. In 1840, it was home to 394 people.

== Gallery ==
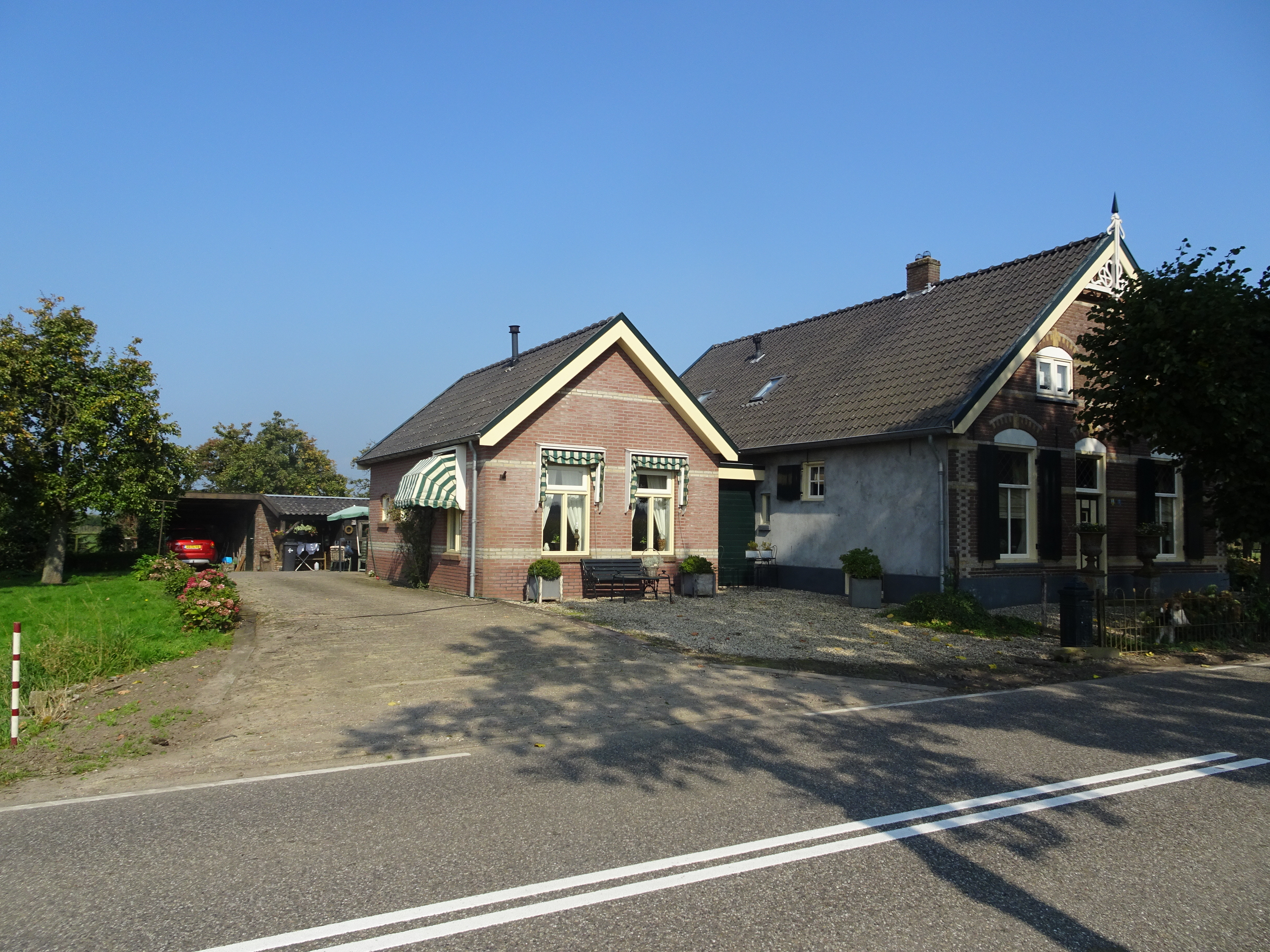
Farm in IJzendoorn

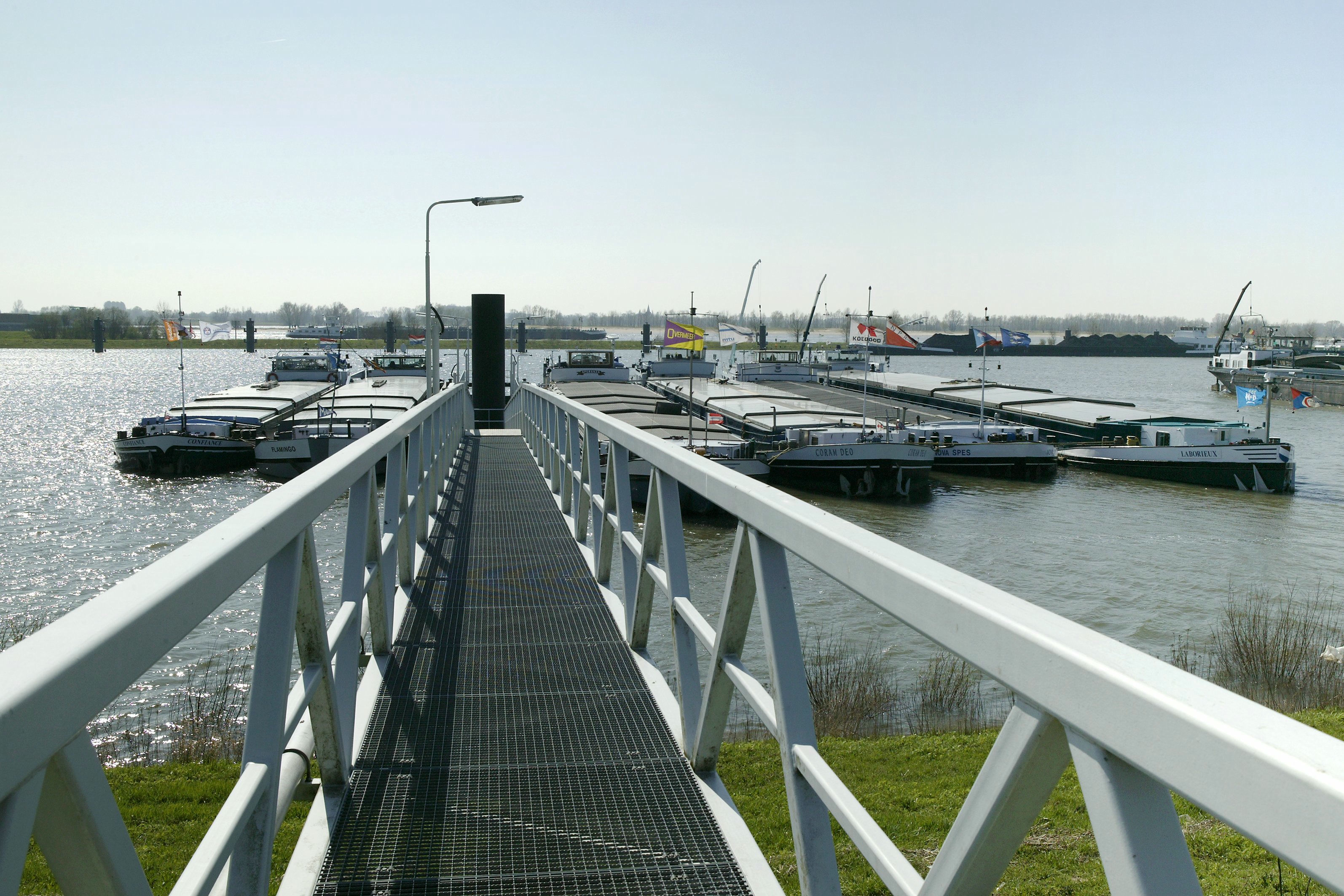
Harbour of IJzendoorn

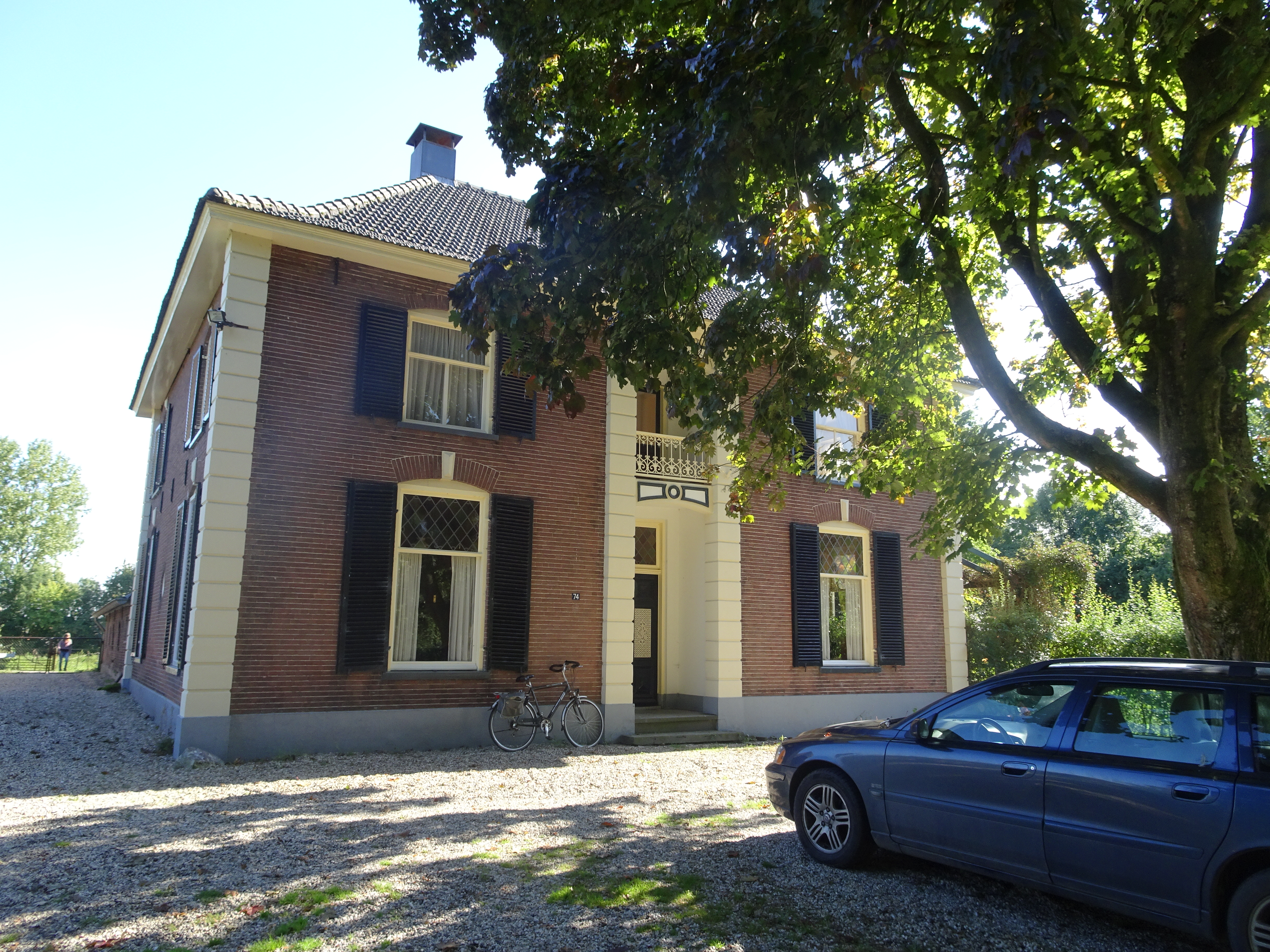
Villa in IJzendoorn
