= Echteld =

- Village
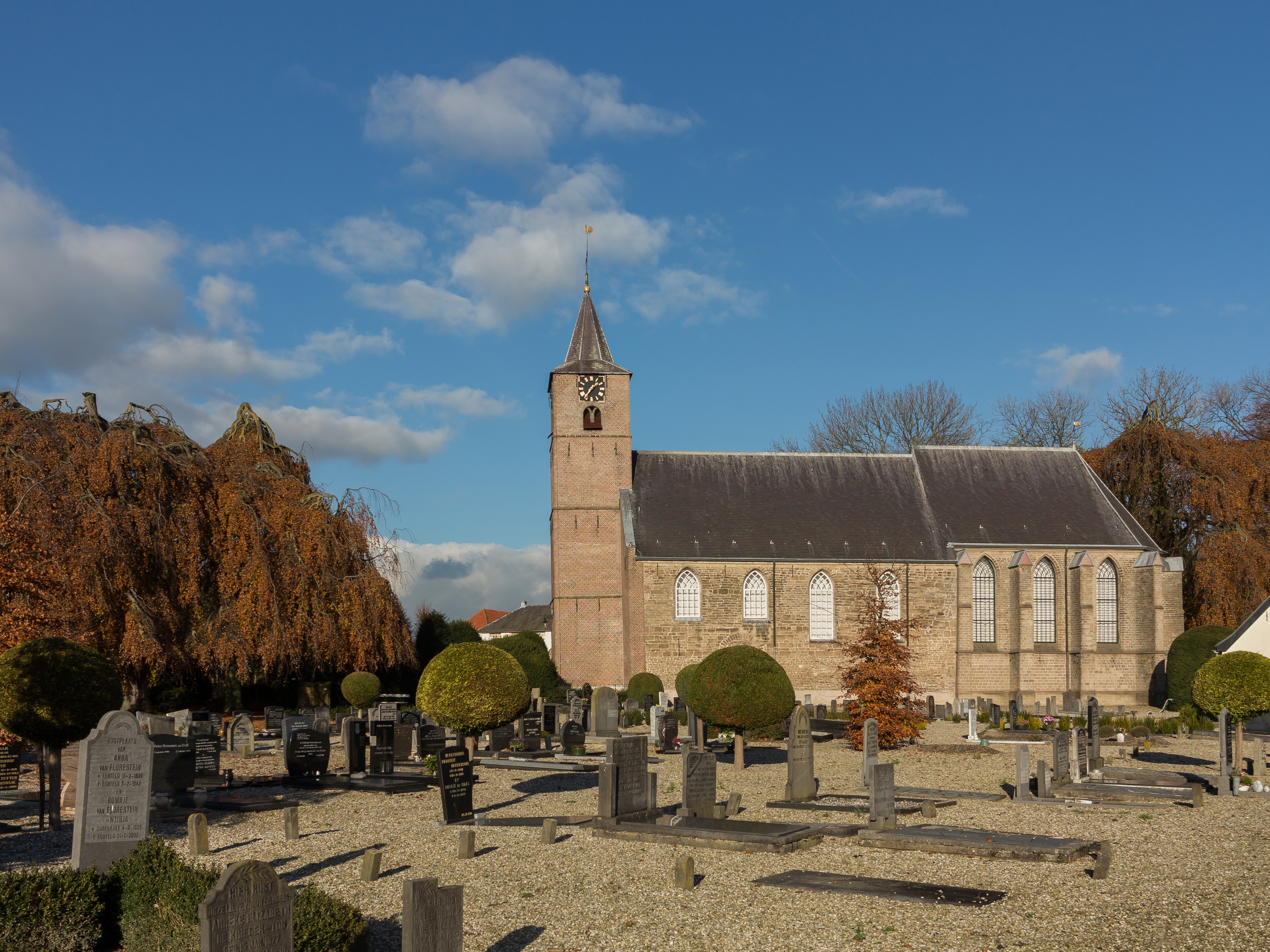
- Reformed Church in Echteld

- Flag Coat of arms

- Location in the Netherlands Echteld (Netherlands)
- Coordinates: 51°55′N 5°30′E
- Country: Netherlands
- Province: Gelderland
- Municipality: Montferland

Area
  - Total: 13.13 km^{2} (5.07 sq mi)
- Elevation: 6 m (20 ft)

Population (2021)
  - Total: 1,050
  - Density: 80.0/km^{2} (207/sq mi)
- Time zone: UTC+1 (CET)
  - Summer (DST): UTC+2 (CEST)
- Postal code: 4054
- Dialing code: 0344

Echteld (Dutch pronunciation: [ˈɛxtəlt]) is a village in the Dutch province of Gelderland. It is a part of the municipality of Neder-Betuwe, and lies about 6 km east of Tiel.

Echteld was a separate municipality between 1818 and 2002, when it was merged with Kesteren. Before 1818, the municipality was called Ochten, after a neighbouring village.

== History ==
It was first mentioned in 1395 or 1396 as Echtelt. The etymology is unknown. Around 850, it was named UUia meaning temple. The Dutch Reformed Church contains elements from the 12th century or maybe earlier. The tower was built in 1835, because the previous tower had collapsed. In 1840, it was home to 280 people. Echteld had a railway station on the Dordrecht to Elst railway line between 1882 and 1938. The building is now a residential home.

Castle Wijenburg was first constructed in the 12th century. Otto van Wijhe, the owner of the castle, had chosen the side of Duke of Burgundy. In 1492, the castle was destroyed by the Duke of Gelre. In 1568, it was rebuilt and since 1956, it is owned by Stichting Vrienden der Geldersche Kasteelen and is used as a wedding location.

== Gallery ==
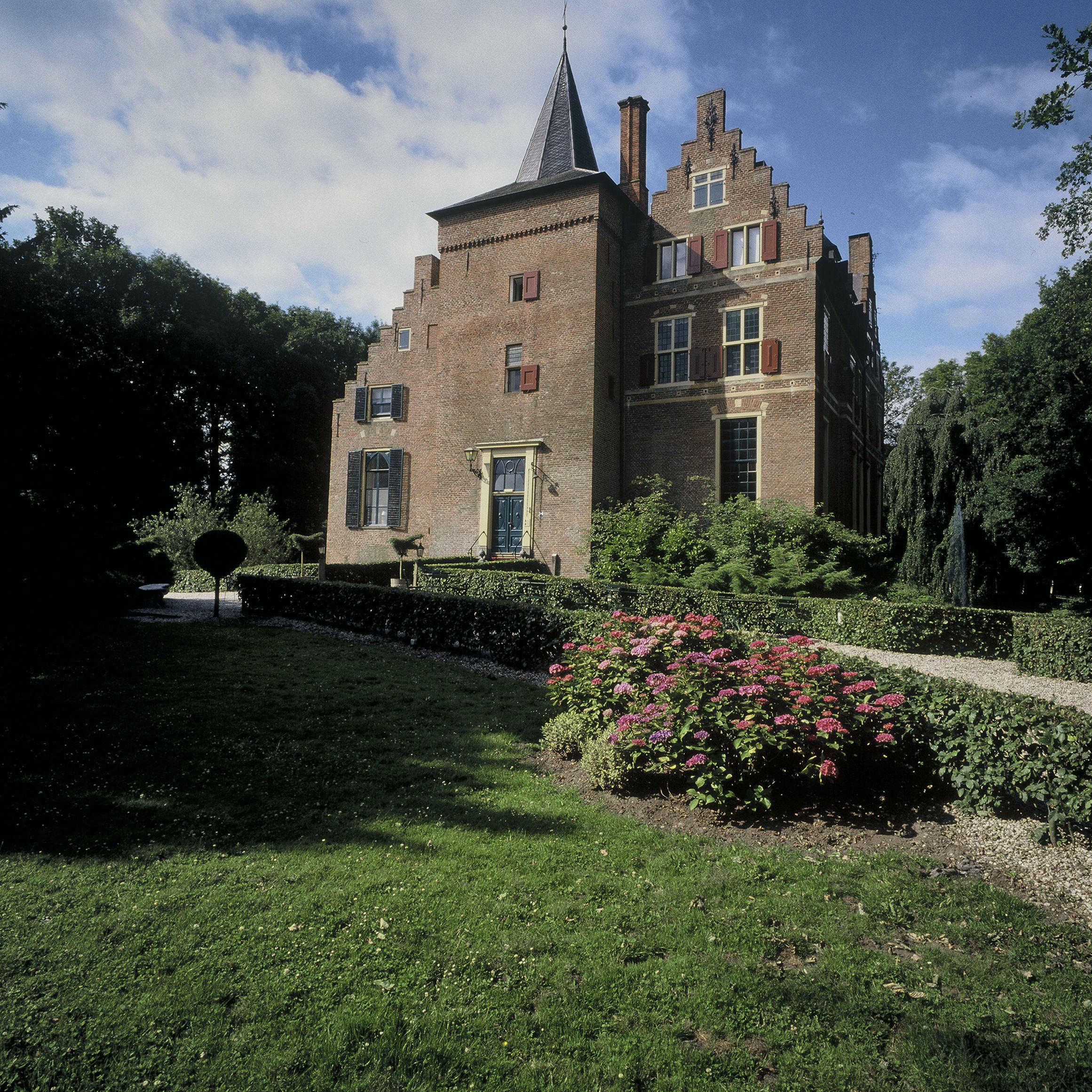
Castle Wijenburg

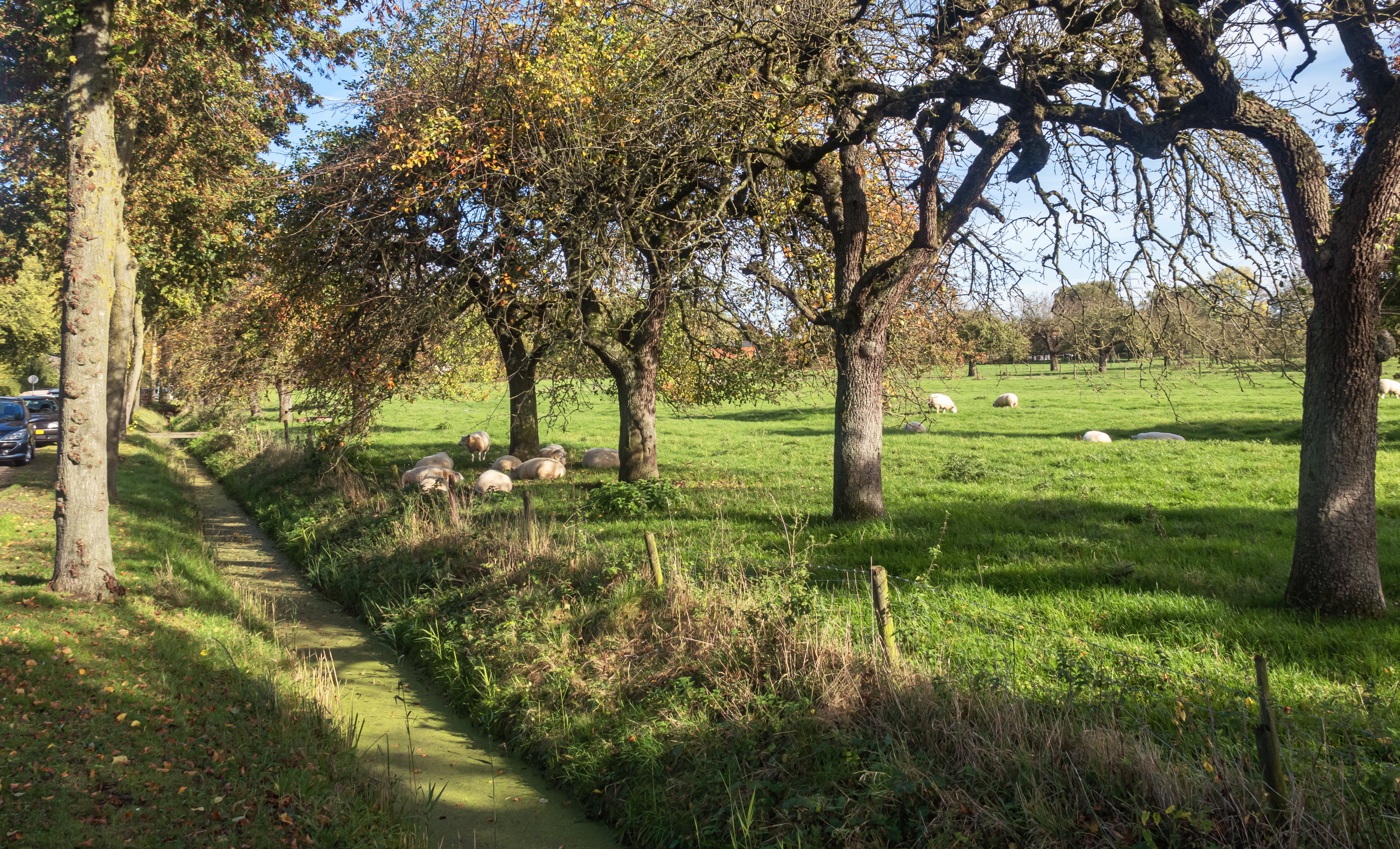
Sheep under the trees (near the Ooisestraat)

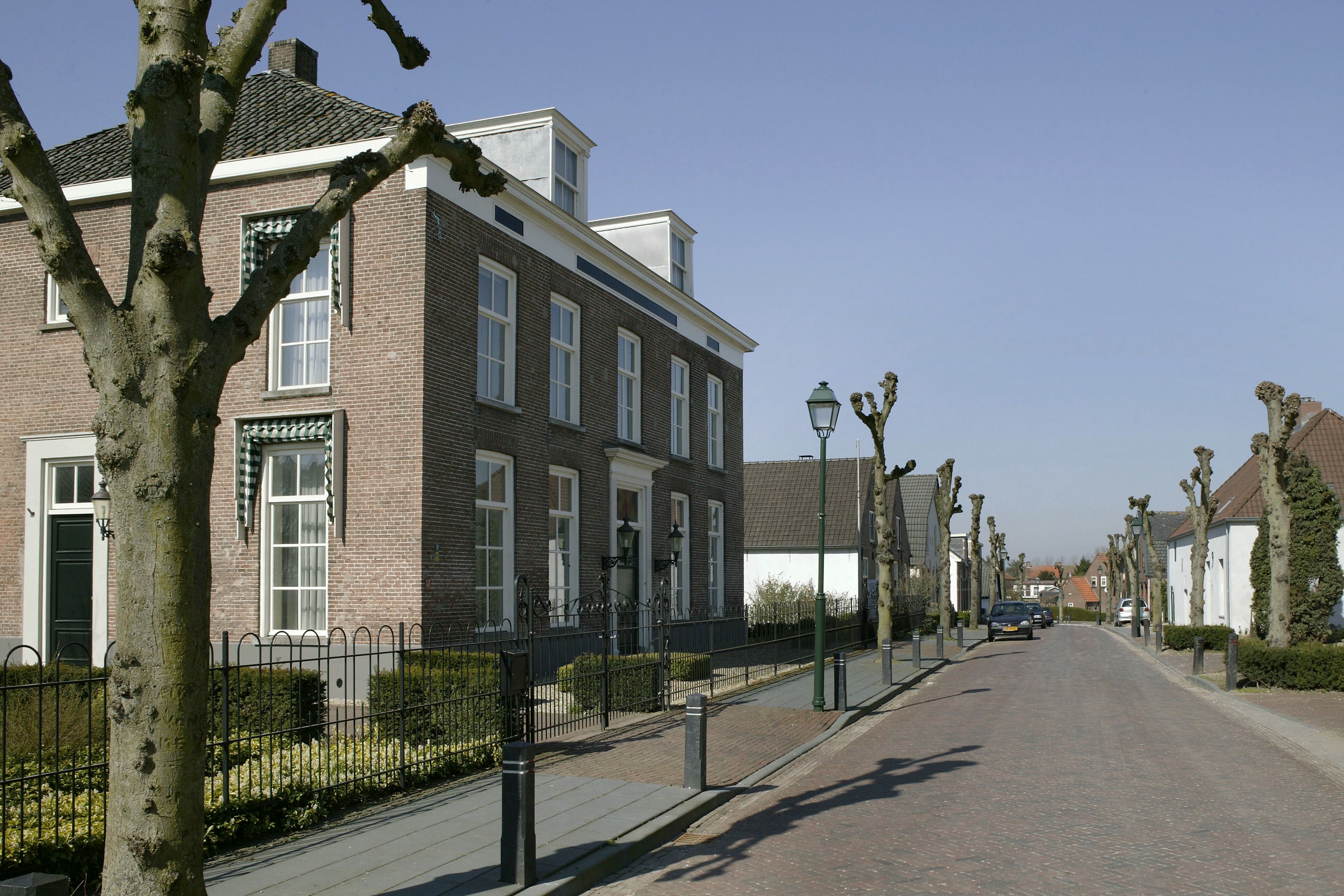
Street view

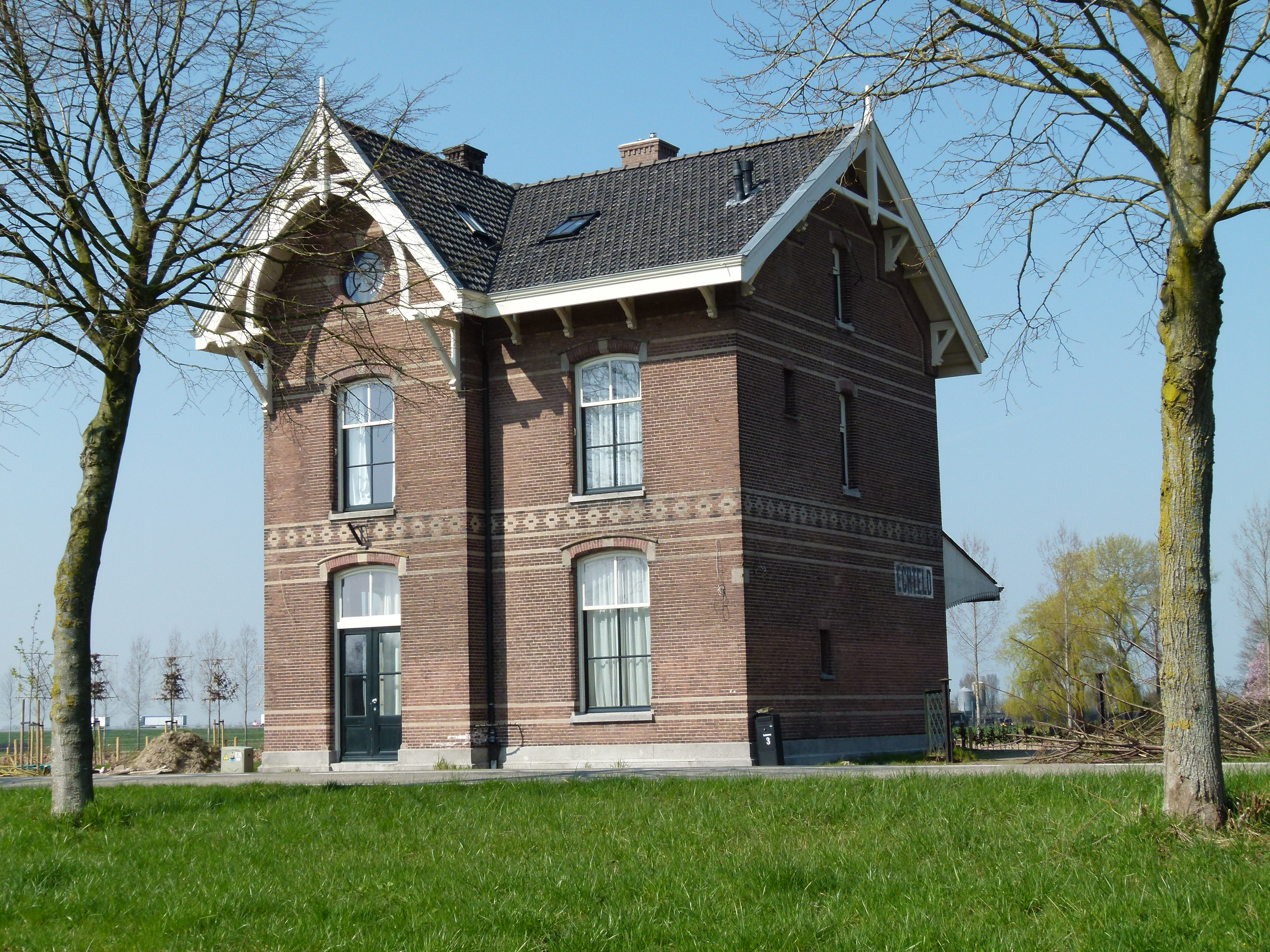
Former railway station
