= Kesteren =

Place in Gelderland, Netherlands

- Village
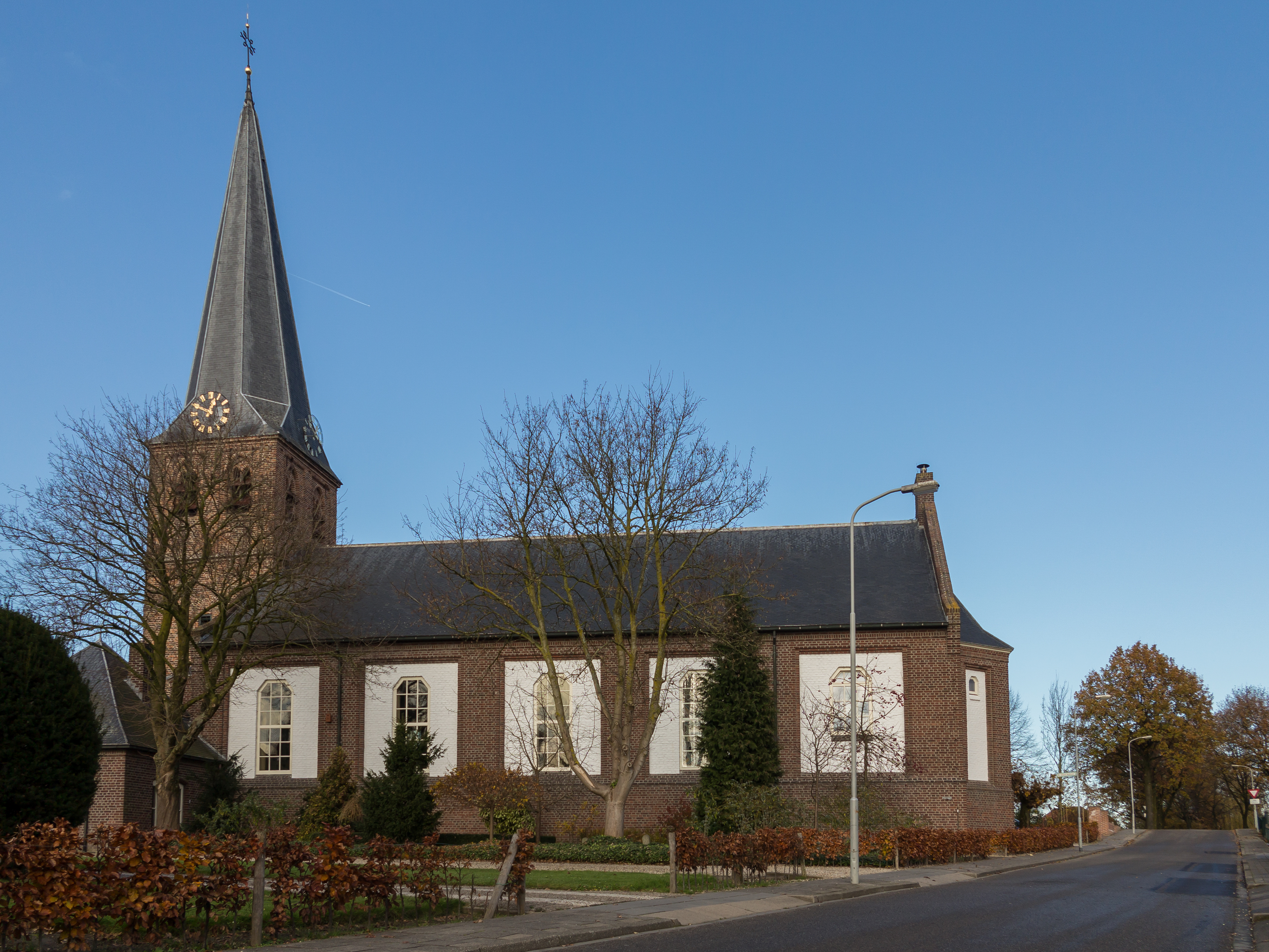
- Kesteren, reformed church

- Flag Coat of arms

- Location in the Netherlands Kesteren (Netherlands)
- Coordinates: 51°56′N 5°34′E
- Country: Netherlands
- Province: Gelderland
- Municipality: Montferland

Area
  - Total: 5.27 km^{2} (2.03 sq mi)
- Elevation: 7 m (23 ft)

Population (2022)
  - Total: 6,854
  - Density: 1,300/km^{2} (3,370/sq mi)
- Time zone: UTC+1 (CET)
  - Summer (DST): UTC+2 (CEST)
- Postal code: 4041
- Dialing code: 0488

Kesteren (Dutch pronunciation: [ˈkɛstərə(n)]) is a village in the Dutch province of Gelderland. It is a part of the municipality of Neder-Betuwe, and lies about 8 km southwest of Wageningen.

Kesteren was a separate municipality until 2002, when it merged with Dodewaard and Echteld. The new municipality was first called "Kesteren", but changed its name to Neder-Betuwe in 2003.

== History ==
It was first mentioned in 850 as Castra, and is Latin for "army camp". Kesteren developed along the Nederrijn as a linear settlement. The tower of the Dutch Reformed Church dates from the 14th century. The church was built around 1500, but was destroyed during World War II and rebuilt in 1951. In 1840, it was home to 552 people.

== Transportation ==
Railway Station: Kesteren.

== Gallery ==
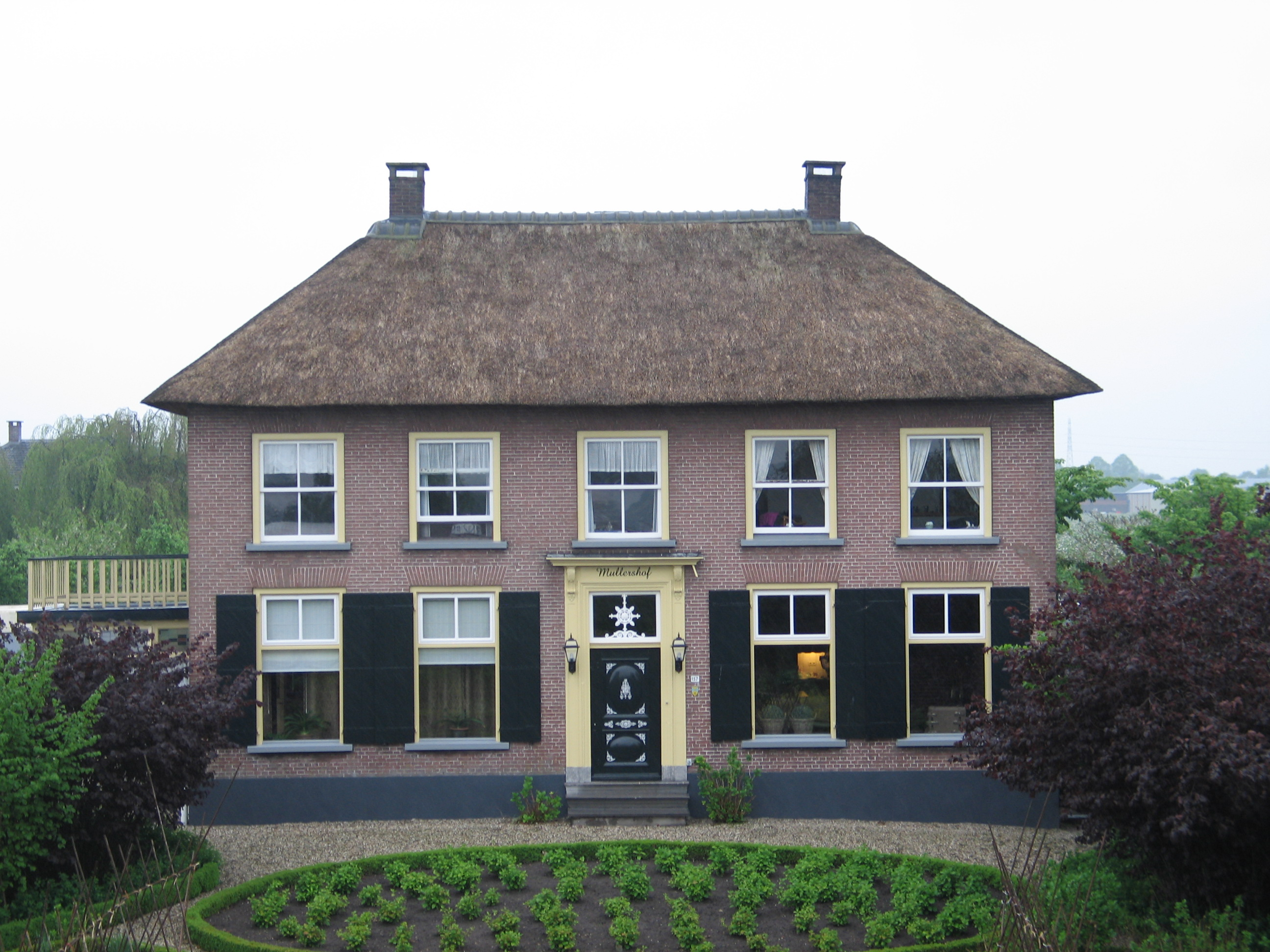
Villa in Kesteren

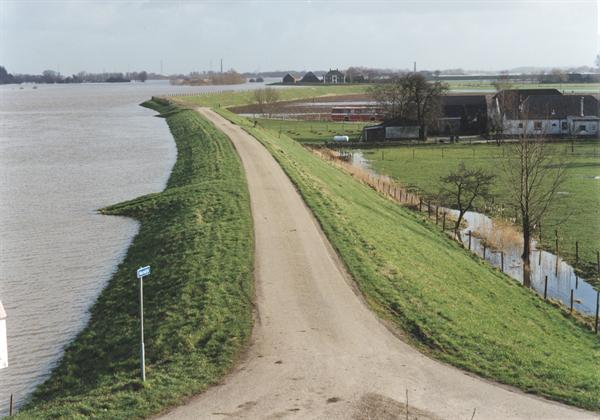
High water

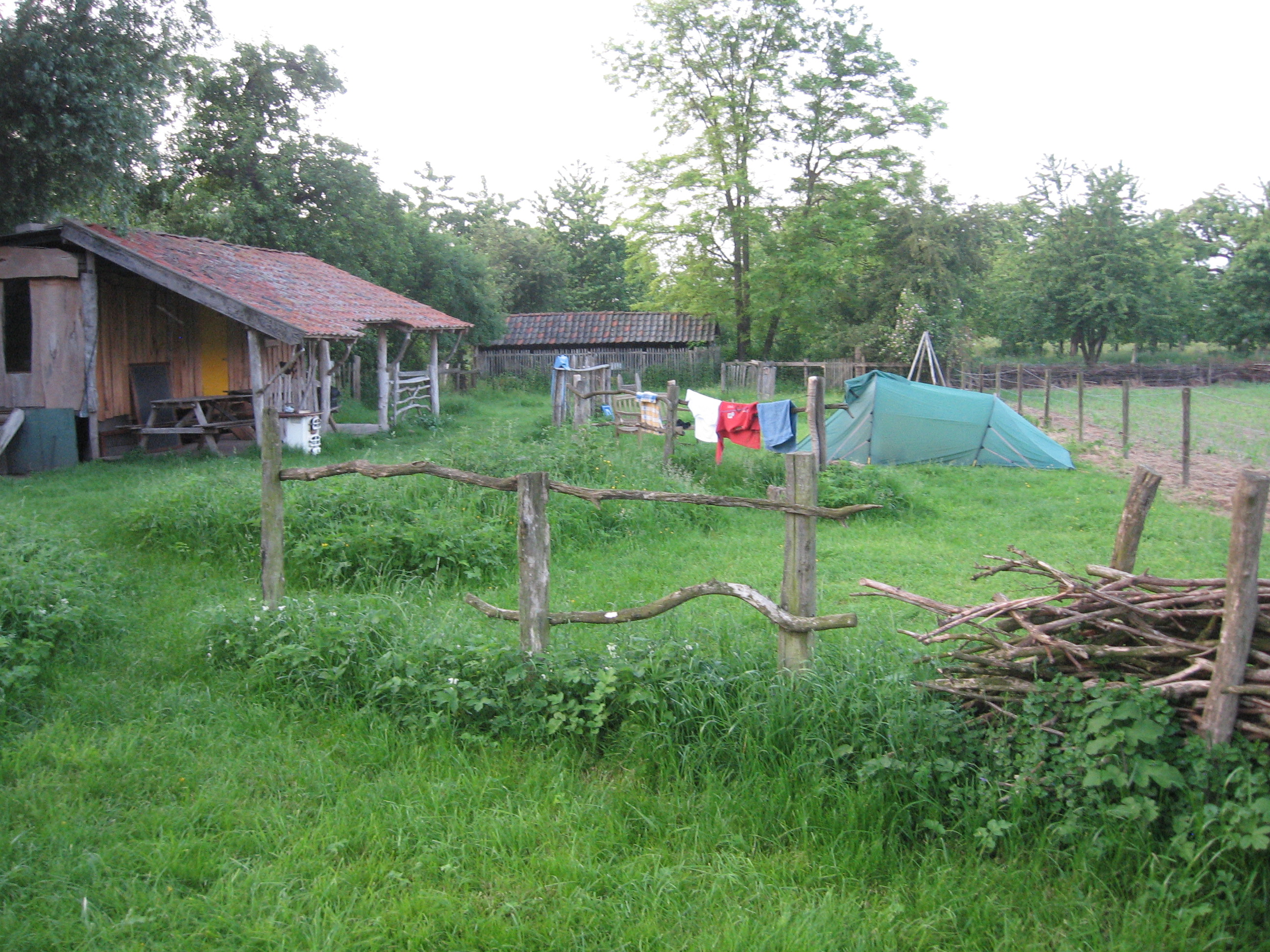
Nature camping

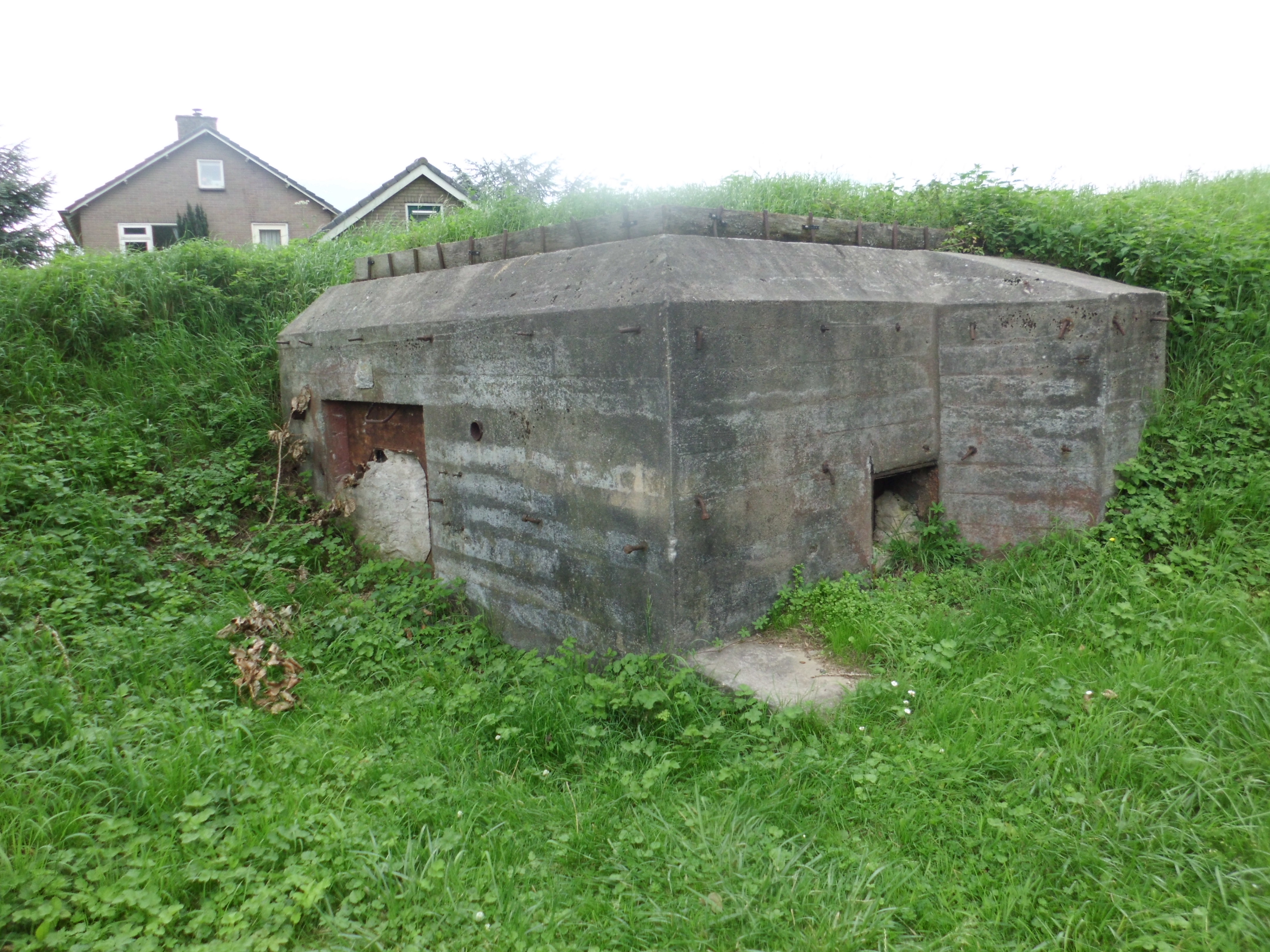
Bunker
