= Dordrecht Zuid railway station =

Railway station in the Netherlands

Dordrecht Zuid
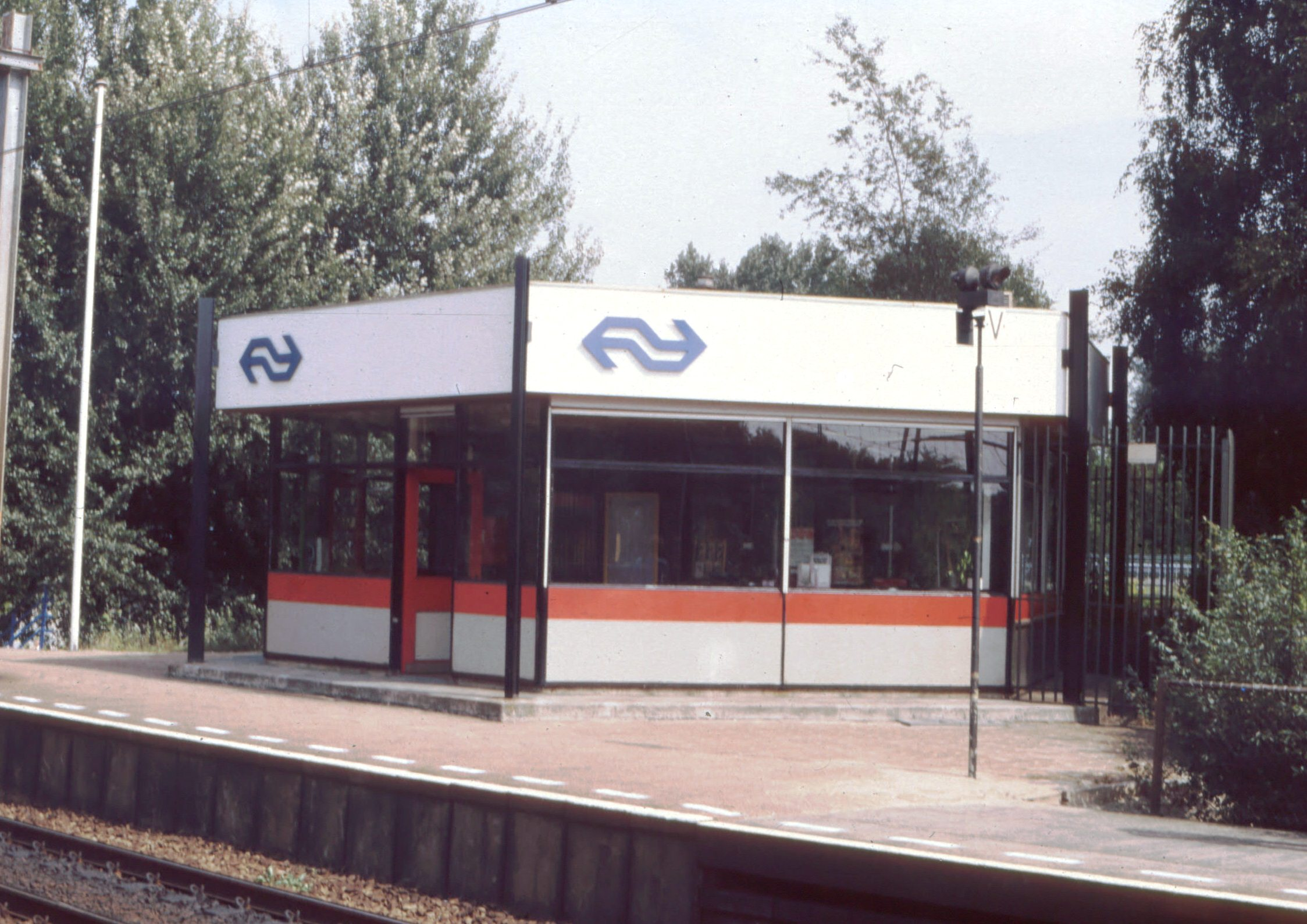

General information
- Location: Dordrecht; Netherlands
- Coordinates: 51°47′23″N 4°40′17″E
- Operator: Nederlandse Spoorwegen
- Line: Breda–Rotterdam railway
- Platforms: 2

Other information
- Station code: Ddzd

Services
Preceding station	Nederlandse Spoorwegen	Following station
Dordrecht Terminus	NS Sprinter 5900	Lage Zwaluwe towards Roosendaal
Dordrecht Terminus	NS Sprinter 6600 Mon-Sat until 19:00	Lage Zwaluwe towards Arnhem Centraal
Dordrecht Terminus	NS Sprinter 6600 After 19:00 and Sun	Lage Zwaluwe towards Nijmegen
Location
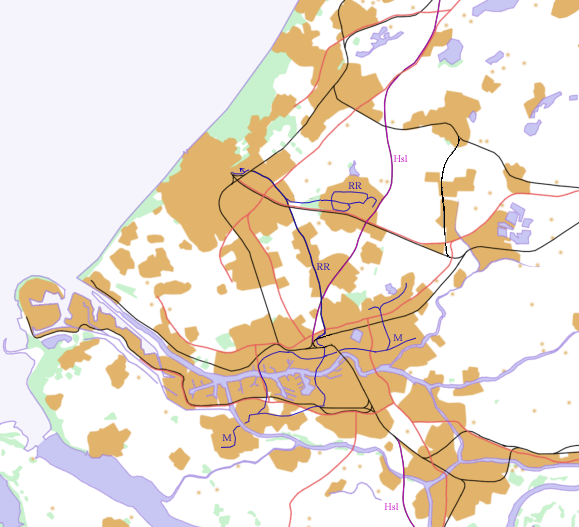
- Location within Southwest Randstad Location within Netherlands

Dordrecht Zuid is a railway station in the south of Dordrecht, Netherlands, located on the Breda–Rotterdam railway between Lage Zwaluwe and Dordrecht. Trains running between Den Haag Centraal, Roosendaal and Breda stop at this station. The current railway building was constructed in the early 1970s.

== Train services ==
The following services call at Dordrecht Zuid:

- 2x per hour local service (sprinter) Dordrecht - Breda - Tilburg - 's-Hertogenbosch
- 2x per hour local service (sprinter) Dordrecht - Roosendaal

== Bus services ==
The station is served by the following bus services, operated by Qbuzz:

Line	Route	Frequency	Notes
5	Sterrenburg - Station Zuid - Zuidhoven - Krispijn Oost - Centrum - Stadskantoor - Centraal Station - Het Reeland - Station Stadspolders - Stadspolders	Outside Summer holidays: 4x/hour, but only 2x/hour at evenings and Sundays; Summer holidays: 4x/hour, but only 2x/hour on weekdays outside rush hours and at evenings and weekends	
892	Station Rotterdam Centraal - Rotterdam - Hendrik-Ido-Ambacht - Zwijndrecht - Dordrecht, Centraal Station - Dordrecht, Centrum - Dordrecht, Stadskantoor - Dordrecht, Krispijn - Dordrecht, Zuidhoven - Dordrecht, Station Zuid - Dordrecht, Sterrenburg	1x/hour	Nightbus service, Saturday Nights only; Buses FROM Dordrecht TO Rotterdam follow the normal route from Dordrecht, Sterrenburg to Dordrecht, Krispijn. From there these buses continue to Dordrecht, Centraal Station first and then to Dordrecht, Stadskantoor via Dordrecht, Centrum. From Dordrecht, Stadskantoor these buses continue directly to Rotterdam via highway A16 skipping Zwijndrecht and Hendrik-Ido-Ambacht along the way
