= Zwijndrecht railway station =

Railway station in the Netherlands

Zwijndrecht
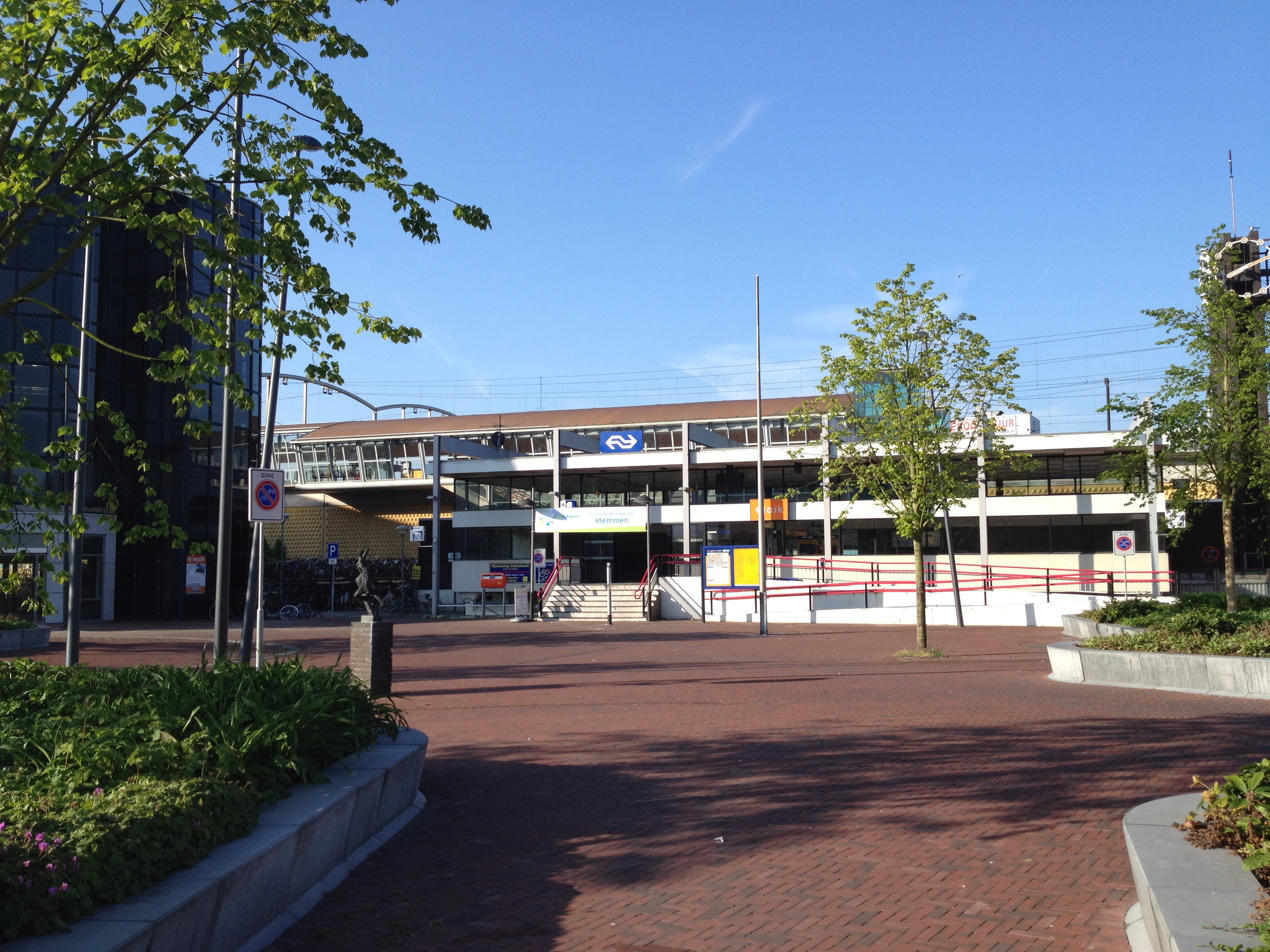

General information
- Location: Netherlands
- Coordinates: 51°48′53″N 4°38′32″E
- Line: Breda–Rotterdam railway
- Platforms: 4

Other information
- Station code: Zwd

History
- Opened: 1872 (old) 1965 (current)

Services
Preceding station	Nederlandse Spoorwegen	Following station
Barendrecht towards Den Haag Centraal	NS Sprinter 5000 Mon-Fri until 20:00	Dordrecht Terminus
Barendrecht towards Den Haag Centraal	NS Sprinter 5100	Dordrecht Terminus
Barendrecht towards Den Haag Centraal	NS Sprinter 5200 Mon-Thu until 19:00	Dordrecht Terminus
Location
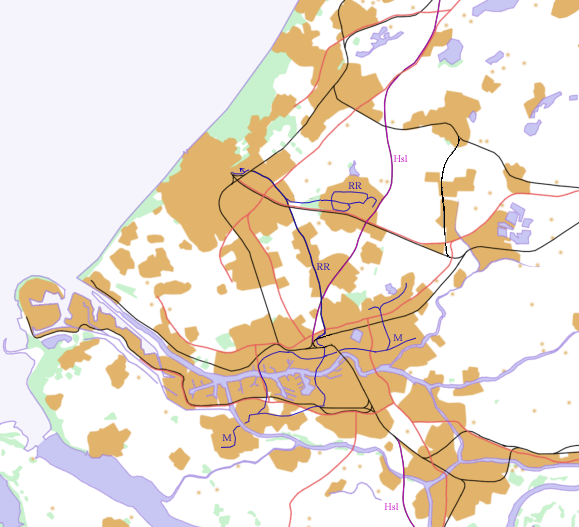
- Location within Southwest Randstad Location within Netherlands

Zwijndrecht is a railway station in Zwijndrecht, Netherlands, located on the Breda–Rotterdam railway between Rotterdam and Dordrecht.

Zwijndrecht's first railway station was opened on 1 November 1872. In 1895 the station was relocated to the southeast, because the old location was not very convenient. The current railway building was constructed in 1965.

== Train services ==
The following services call at Zwijndrecht:

- 4x per hour local service (sprinter) The Hague - Rotterdam - Dordrecht

== Bus Services ==
- 11
- 12
- 88
- 92
- 188
- 717
