= De Hef =

Bridge in Rotterdam, Netherlands

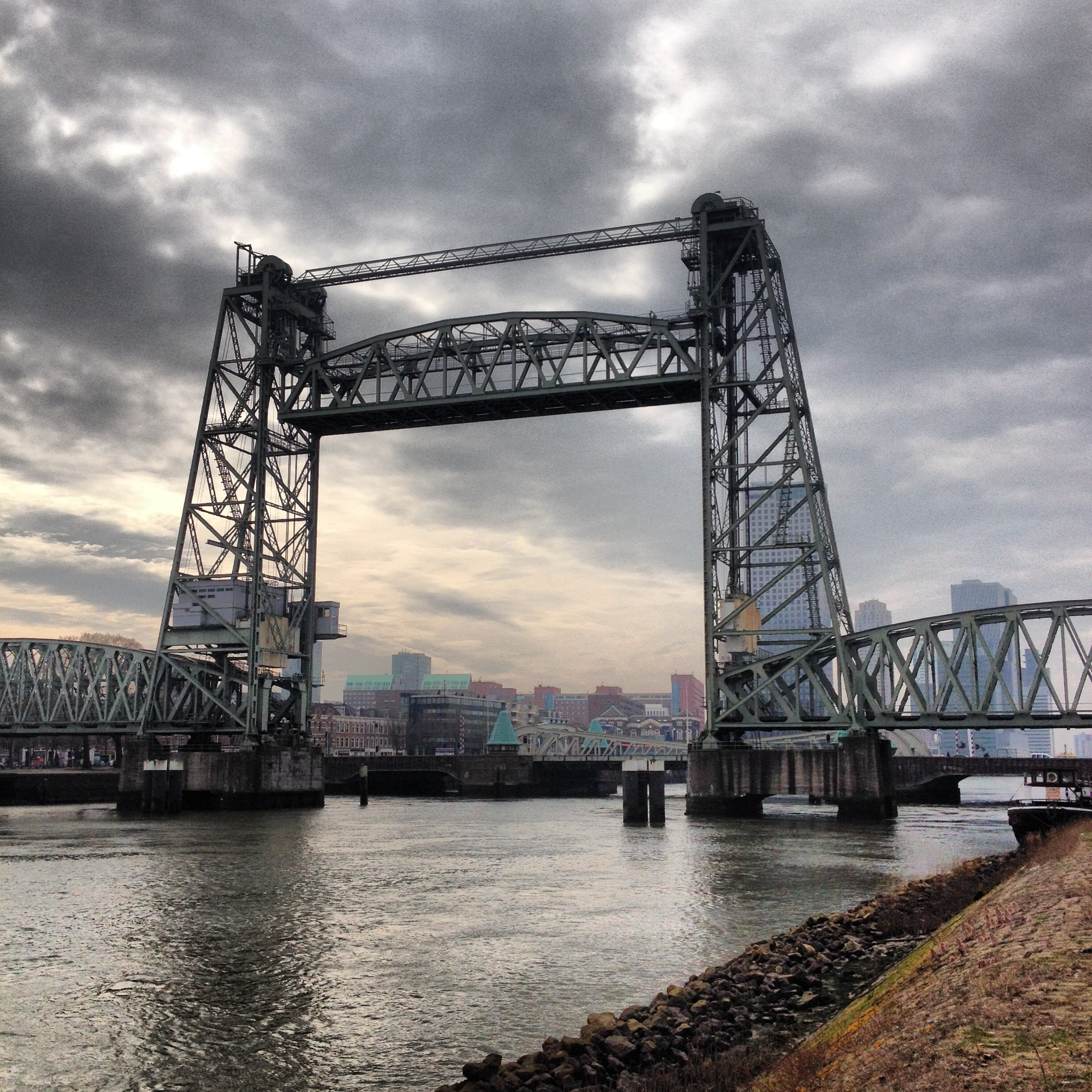
- Coordinates: 51.9134°N 4.4989°E
- Crosses: Koningshaven

Characteristics
- Total length: 79 m (259 ft)
- Width: 11 m (36 ft)

History
- Architect: Pieter Joosting
- Opening: 1927

Location
- Interactive map of De Hef

De Hef (lit. 'the lift'), officially Koningshaven Bridge, is a vertical-lift bridge over the Koningshaven (Kings Harbor) channel at the port of Rotterdam, Netherlands. Built in 1927, the bridge was part of the Breda–Rotterdam railway line until it was decommissioned in 1993. Today, it is a Rijksmonument heritage site.

== History ==
The predecessor bridge dated from 1878. Its configuration as a swing bridge proved an obstacle to shipping (the most notable incident occurring in 1918, when the bridge was struck by the German vessel Kandelfels), and it was replaced by a lift bridge in 1927. It was the first bridge of this kind in western Europe.

The bridge was the subject of a 1928 film by Joris Ivens, titled De brug.

In 1933, Lou Vlasblom performed a high dive from the bridge.

== Redevelopment ==
Plans to demolish the railway line and bridge in 1993 were abandoned after widespread protests from local residents. The line was removed but the bridge was left in place as a Rijksmonument national heritage monument.

In November 2014, the disused bridge's 55-metre-long (180 ft) lift span was temporarily removed to permit renovation. It was transported to the Merwehaven port, where it was refurbished in 2016, the work funded by the city of Rotterdam. It was reinstalled in February 2017.

In February 2022, Rotterdam announced that the middle section of the bridge would be temporarily removed again, to allow Jeff Bezos's Y721 superyacht to pass through. In response to criticism of this decision, Rotterdam mayor Ahmed Aboutaleb stated in February of that year that no permit had yet been applied for. Later reports indicated that plans to temporarily dismantle De Hef have been shelved, leaving it unclear if Y721 will be finished as is, and how it will sail down the river if it remains of the same dimensions.

== Gallery ==
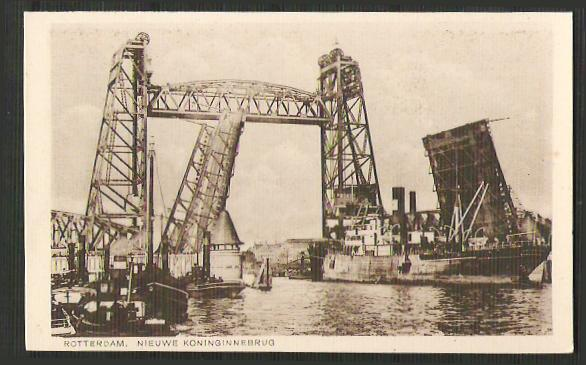
Postcard with the newly opened Nieuwe Koninginnebrug in the foreground, and De Hef behind it.

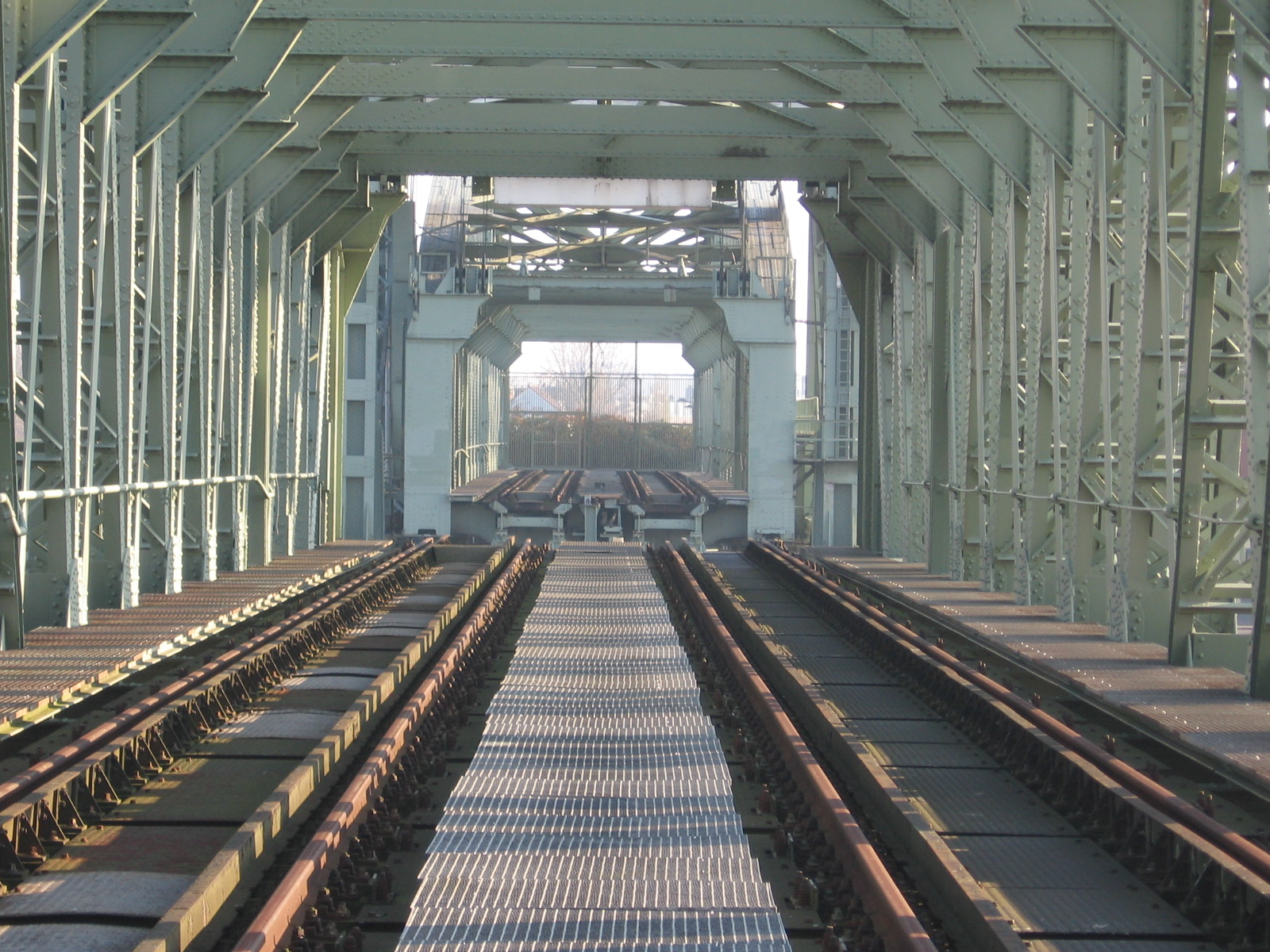
The old tracks on De Hef seen from the Noordereiland

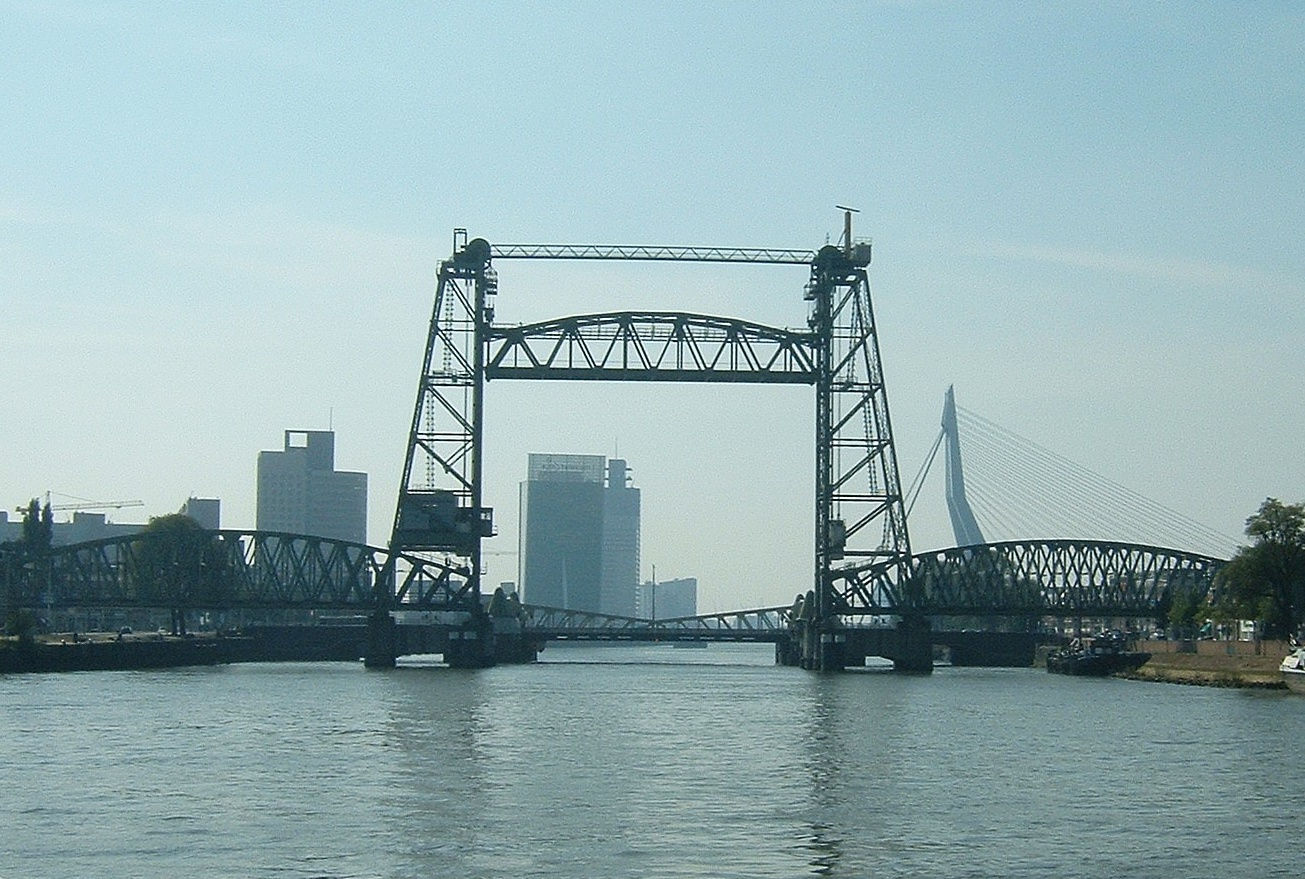
De Hef with the Koninginnebrug behind it.

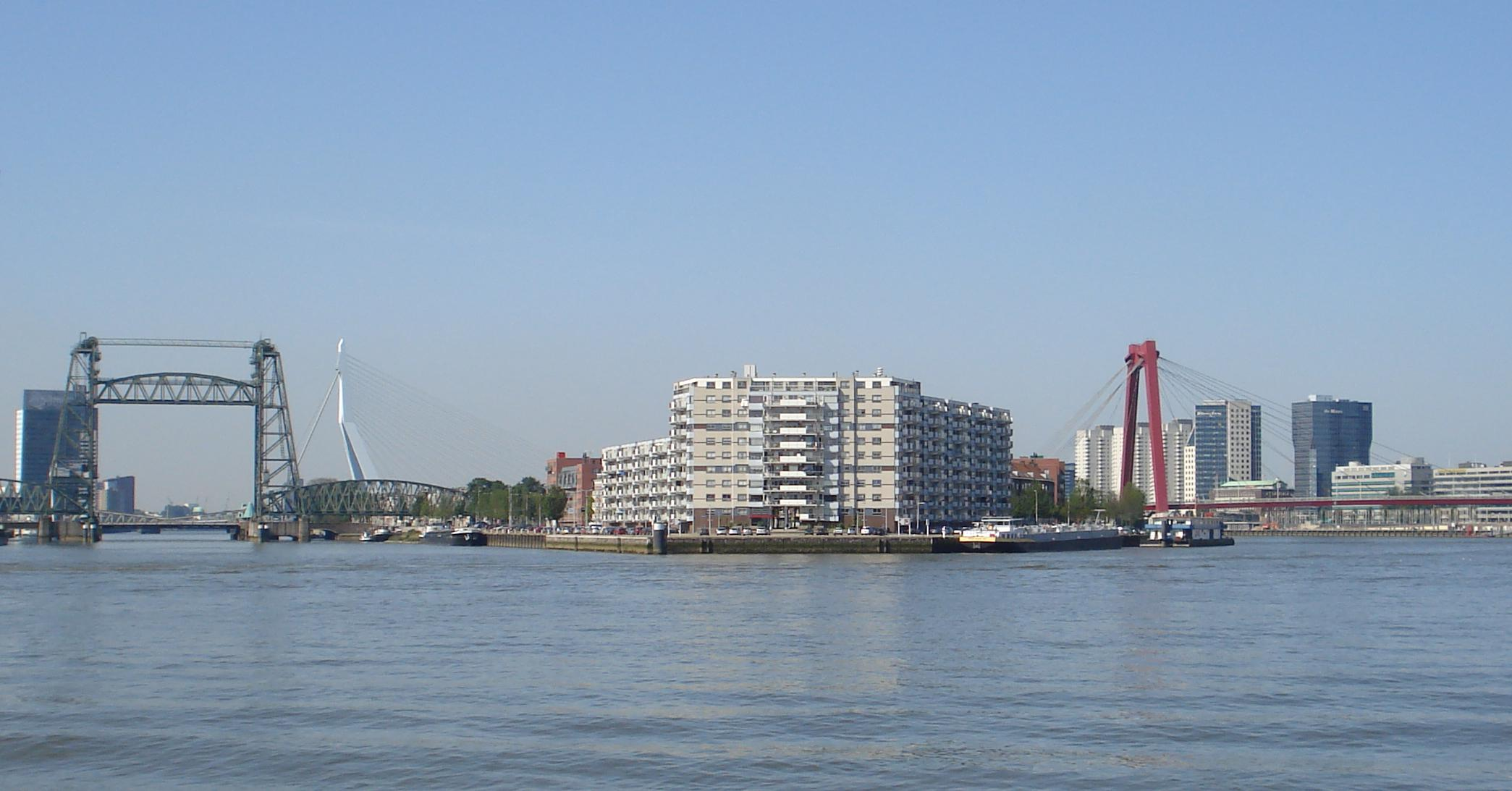
View from Maasboulevard, with De Hef on the far left.

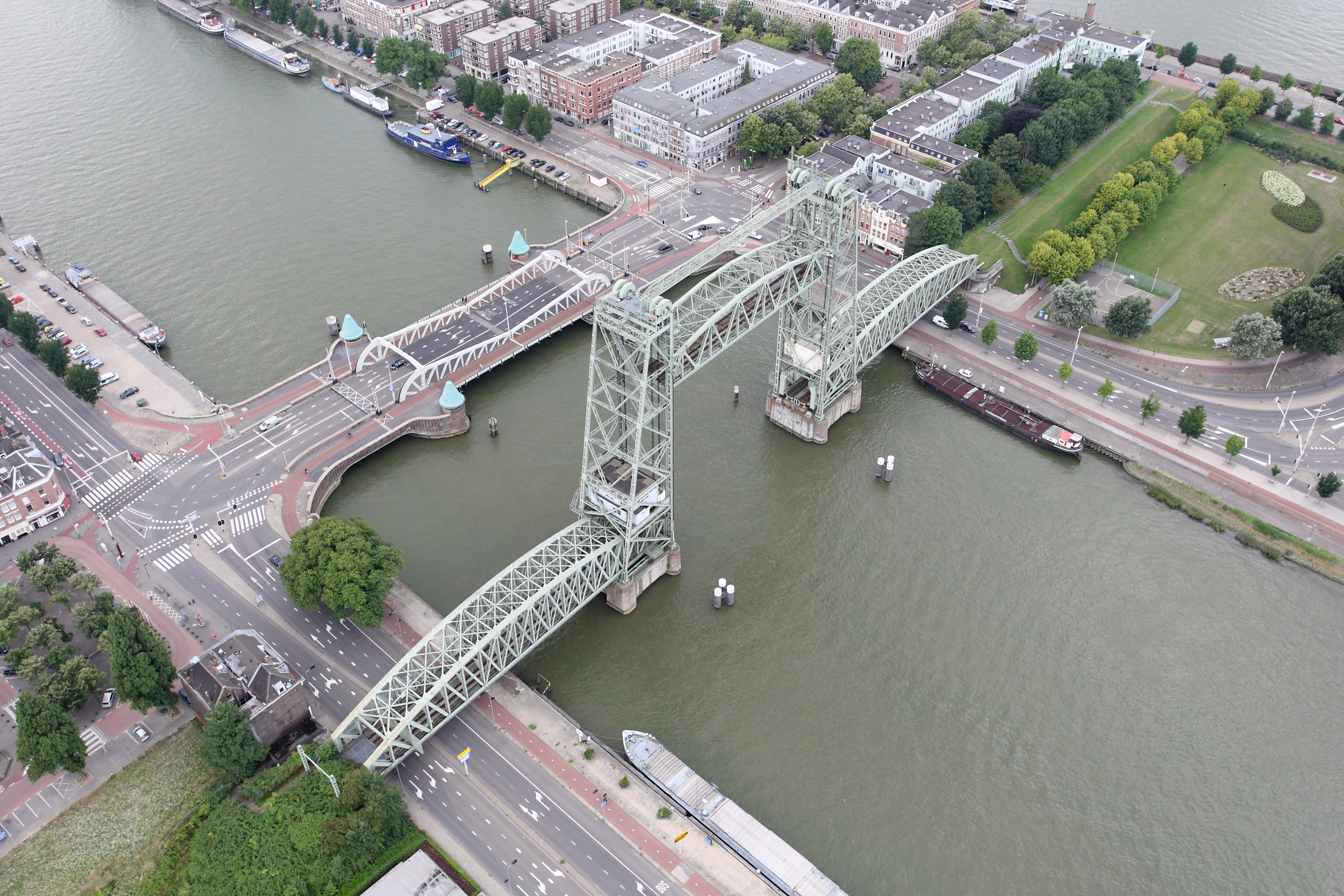
Aerial view of the Koninginnebrug and De Hef.

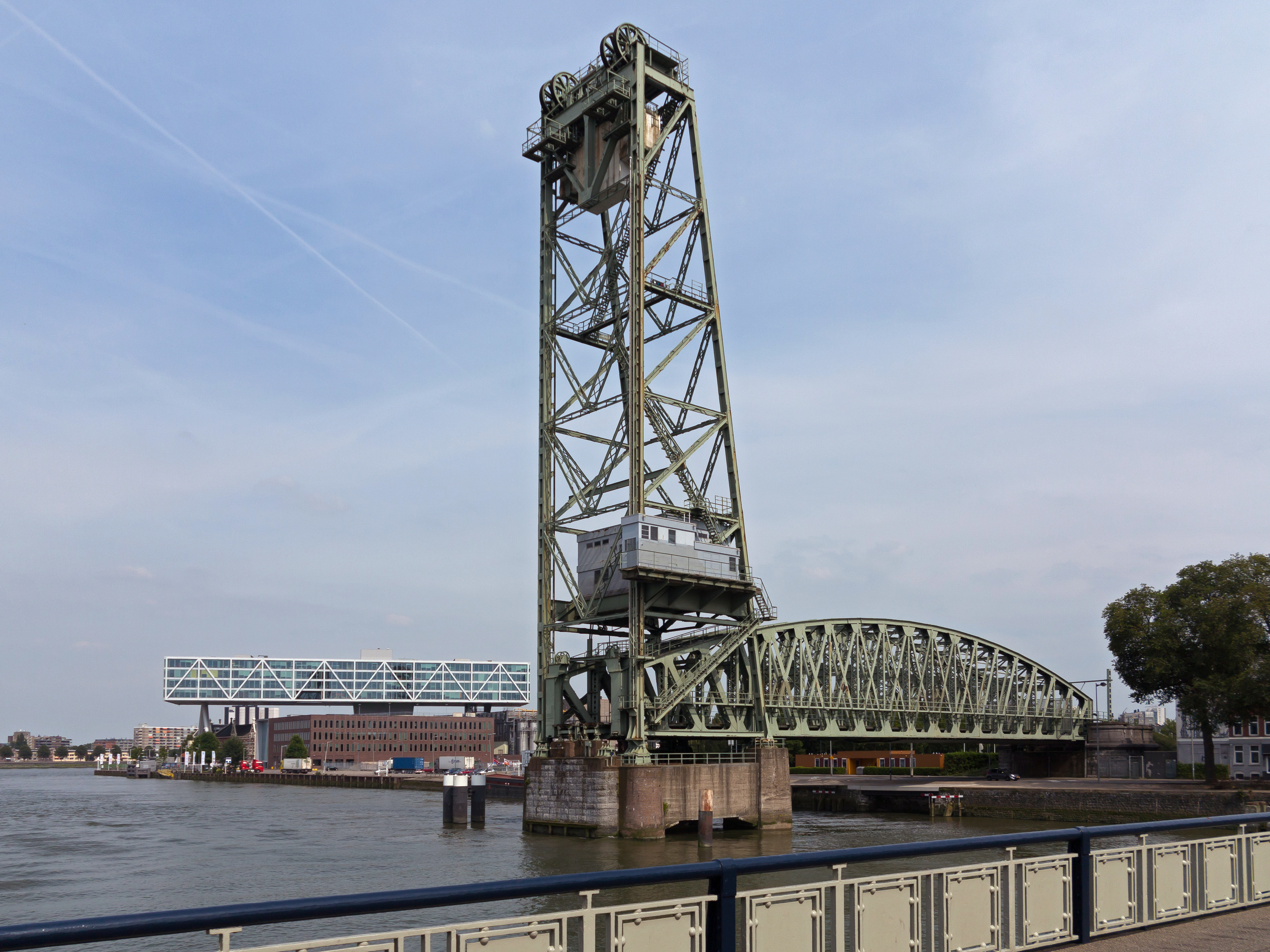
The southern tower of De Hef in 2015, when the lift span was temporarily removed during bridge renovation

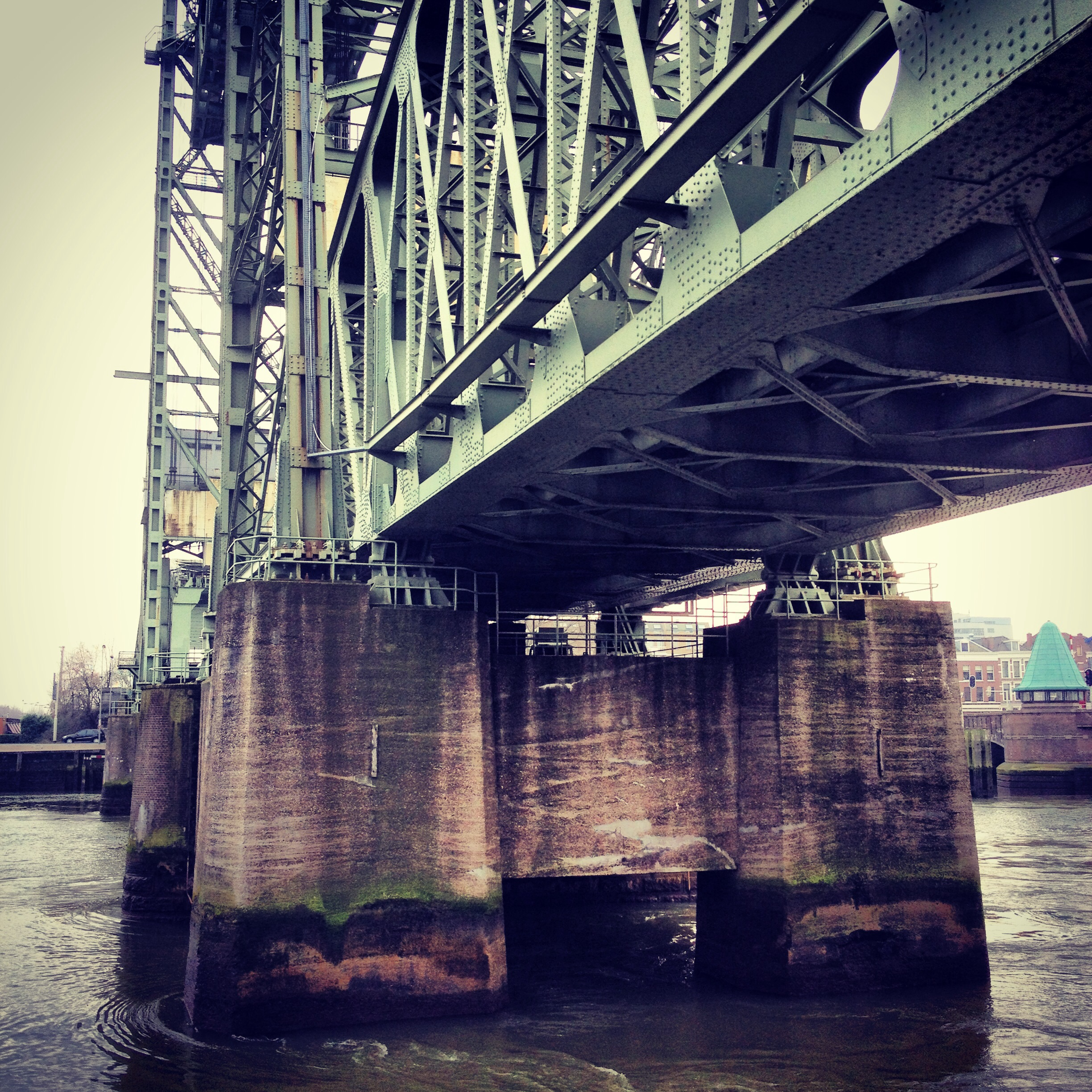
Underside of the bridge

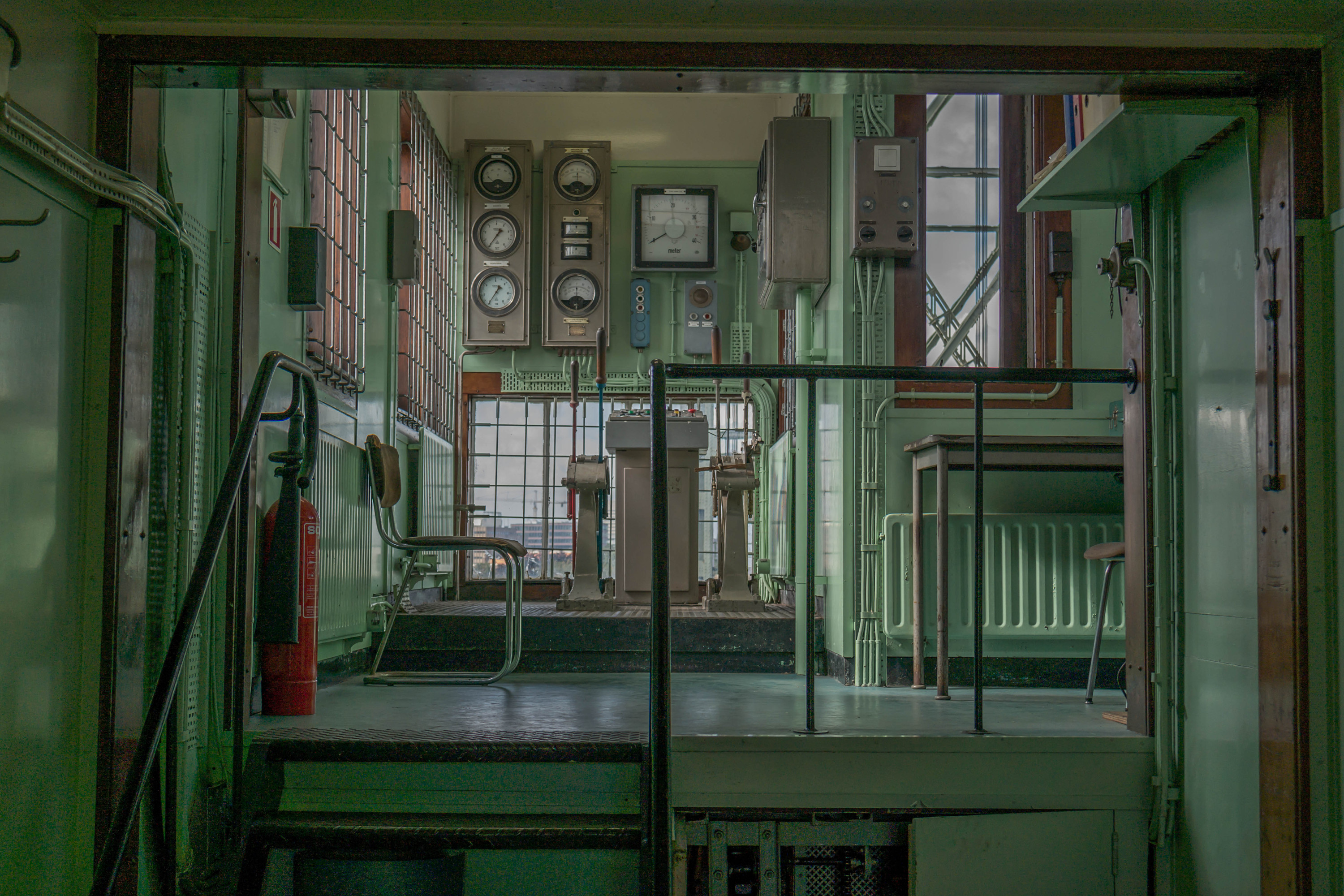
The bridge control room
