= Dordrecht railway station =

Railway station in the Netherlands

Dordrecht
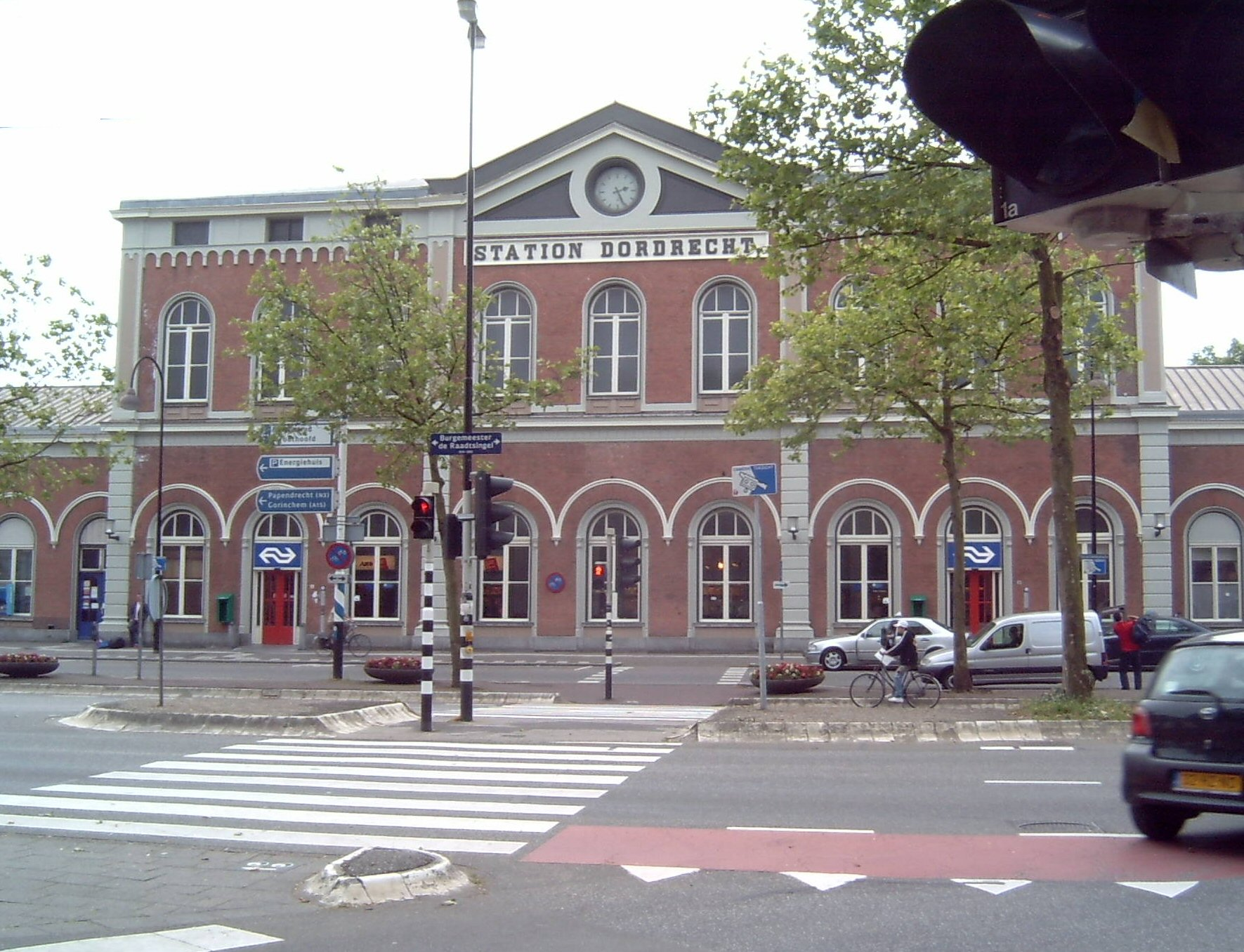
- The front of the historic station building.

General information
- Location: Stationsplein, Dordrecht; Netherlands
- Coordinates: 51°48′27″N 4°40′4″E
- Operator: Nederlandse Spoorwegen, Arriva
- Lines: Breda–Rotterdam railway MerwedeLingelijn
- Platforms: 7
- Connections: Arriva: 2, 3, 4, 5, 7, 8, 9, 10, 11, 12, 13, 14, 15, 16, 18, 19, 21, 88, 92, 165, 166, 168, 178, 388, 501, 620, 892; RET: 145

Other information
- Station code: Ddr

History
- Opened: 1872

Services
| Preceding station | Nederlandse Spoorwegen | Following station |
|---|---|---|
| Rotterdam Blaak towards Amsterdam Centraal | NS Intercity 2200 | Roosendaal towards Vlissingen |
| Rotterdam Blaak towards Amsterdam Centraal | NS Intercity 2300 Mon-Fri until 20:00 | Roosendaal towards Vlissingen |
| Rotterdam Blaak towards Venlo | NS Intercity 3500 | Terminus |
| Rotterdam Centraal Terminus | NS Nachtnet 21410 Fri, Sat night only | Breda towards Eindhoven Centraal |
| Zwijndrecht towards Den Haag Centraal | NS Sprinter 5000 Mon-Fri until 20:00 | Terminus |
| Zwijndrecht towards Den Haag Centraal | NS Sprinter 5100 | Terminus |
| Zwijndrecht towards Den Haag Centraal | NS Sprinter 5200 Mon-Thu until 19:00 | Terminus |
| Terminus | NS Sprinter 5900 | Dordrecht Zuid towards Roosendaal |
| Terminus | NS Sprinter 6600 Mon-Sat until 19:00 | Dordrecht Zuid towards Arnhem Centraal |
| Terminus | NS Sprinter 6600 After 19:00 and Sun | Dordrecht Zuid towards Nijmegen |
| Preceding station | Arriva Netherlands | Following station |
| Terminus | Stoptrein 36700 2x/hour | Dordrecht Stadspolders towards Geldermalsen |
| Terminus | Stoptrein 36800 2x/hour; Not at evenings and Sundays | Dordrecht Stadspolders towards Gorinchem |
Location
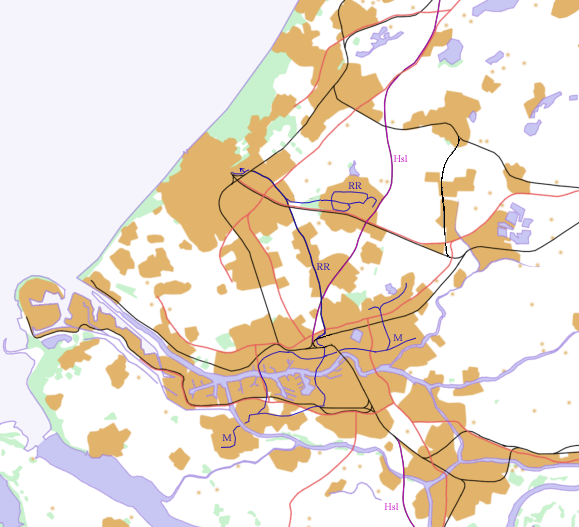
- Location within Southwest Randstad Location within Netherlands

Dordrecht is a railway station in Dordrecht, Netherlands located on the Breda–Rotterdam railway and the Elst–Dordrecht railway. The station was opened on 1 January 1872, when the railway line between Rotterdam and Antwerp was opened. On 16 July 1885, the railway line from Dordrecht to Gorinchem was opened. The neo-Renaissance railway station building is located to the south of the city centre. Dordrecht is now an important railway station on the Nederlandse Spoorwegen railway network. The services to Gorinchem and Geldermalsen are operated by Qbuzz under the R-net formula since the end of 2018 (they were previously operated by Arriva).

== Destinations ==
These are some of the main destinations directly available from Dordrecht:

Rotterdam, The Hague, Leiden, Haarlem, Amsterdam Airport Schiphol, Amsterdam, Roosendaal, Middelburg, Breda, Tilburg, Eindhoven, Venlo, Gorinchem and Geldermalsen.

== Train services ==
The stations is served by the following services:

- 1x per hour international service Amsterdam - Schiphol - The Hague - Rotterdam - Dordrecht - Roosendaal - Antwerp - Brussels Airport - Brussels (Until April 8, 2018)
- 2x per hour intercity service Lelystad - Almere - Duivendrecht - Amsterdam Zuid - Schiphol - Leiden - The Hague - Rotterdam - Dordrecht
- 2x per hour intercity service Amsterdam - Haarlem - Leiden - The Hague - Rotterdam - Dordrecht - Roosendaal - Vlissingen
- 1x per hour intercity service Dordrecht - Breda (Not evenings and weekends)
- 1x per hour night service (nachtnet) Rotterdam - Dordrecht - Breda - Eindhoven (weekends only)
- 4x per hour local service (sprinter) The Hague - Rotterdam - Dordrecht (2x per hour on evenings and weekends)
- 2x per hour local service (sprinter) Dordrecht - Roosendaal (1x per hour on evenings and weekends)
- 2x per hour local service (sprinter) Dordrecht - Breda - Tilburg - 's-Hertogenbosch
- 2x per hour local services (stoptrein) Dordrecht - Gorinchem - Geldermalsen
- 2x per hour local services (stoptrein) Dordrecht - Gorinchem

As of April 9, 2018 the international service Amsterdam - Brussels will be running on the HSL-Zuid with a stop at Breda and does not call at Dordrecht and Roosendaal anymore. Passengers for Belgium can take a train to Breda and change trains there.

== Bus services ==
Dordrecht is served by city bus services (stadsbussen) as well as regional bus services (streekbussen).

=== Stadsbussen ===
There are 8 city bus lines, which are operated by Arriva. From the railway station the city bus lines provides services to/from:

- Centrum (downtown area)
- Stadskantoor (City Hall)
- Ziekenhuis Dordwijk (Hospital)
- Ziekenhuis Amstelwijck (Hospital)
- Stadspolders railway station
- Zuid railway station
- The ferry terminals at Papendrechtse Veer
- The neighbourhoods Crabbehof, Dubbeldam, Het Reeland, Krispijn, Leerpark, Merwedepolder, Noordflank, Oudelandshoek, Staart, Stadspolders, Sterrenburg, Wielwijk and Zuidhoven
- The industrial areas Amstelwijck and West

The routes of the city buses are as follows:

| Line | Route | Frequency | Notes |
|---|---|---|---|
| 2 | Centraal Station - Het Reeland Zuid - Leerpark - Ziekenhuis Dordwijk - Dubbeldam | 2x/hour | Arrives/Continues at Centraal Station as regional bus line 11/12 to/from Centrum and Zwijndrecht. (See also: Streekbussen) |
| 3 | Crabbehof - Krispijn - Centrum - Stadskantoor - Centraal Station - Het Reeland Noord - Oudelandshoek | Outside Summer and Christmas holidays: 4x/hour, but only 2x/hour at evenings and Sundays; Summer holidays: 4x/hour, but only 2x/hour on weekdays mornings until +/- 11:00am and on evenings and weekends; Christmas holidays: 4x/hour, but only 2x/hour on weekdays mornings until +/- 11:00am and on evenings and Sundays | |
| 4 | Ziekenhuis Amstelwijck - Wielwijk - Krispijn West - Centrum - Stadskantoor - Centraal Station - Het Reeland Noord - Staart - Merwedepolder | Outside Summer holidays: 4x/hour, but only 2x/hour FROM Ziekenhuis Amstelwijck TO Centraal Station on weekdays evening rush hours and only 2x/hour on the whole route on evenings and Sundays; Summer holidays: 4x/hour, but only 2x/hour FROM Ziekenhuis Amstelwijck TO Centraal Station on weekdays evening rush hours and only 2x/hour on the whole route on evenings and weekends | |
| 5 | Sterrenburg - Station Zuid - Zuidhoven - Krispijn Oost - Centrum - Stadskantoor - Centraal Station - Het Reeland - Station Stadspolders - Stadspolders | Outside Summer holidays: 4x/hour, but only 2x/hour at evenings and Sundays; Summer holidays: 4x/hour, but only 2x/hour on weekdays outside rush hours and at evenings and weekends | |
| 7 | Sterrenburg - Ziekenhuis Dordwijk - Leerpark - Het Reeland Zuid - Centraal Station - Stadskantoor - Centrum | Outside Summer holidays: 4x/hour, but only 2x/hour at evenings and Sundays; Summer holidays: 4x/hour, but only 2x/hour on weekdays outside rush hours and at evenings and weekends | |
| 8 | Merwedepolder - Staart - Het Reeland Noord - Centraal Station - Stadskantoor - Centrum - West - Amstelwijck - Ziekenhuis Amstelwijck | 1x/hour, but 2x/hour during rush hours | Weekdays only and not on evenings; The section between Merwedepolder and Central Station is only served at morning rush hours.; From Merwedepolder/Central Station to Ziekenhuis Amstelwijck buses operate only at morning rush hours and early afternoons; From Ziekenhuis Amstelwijck to Central Station buses operate only on late mornings, afternoons and evening rush hours |
| 9 | Centraal Station - Centrum - Stadskantoor - Krabbepolder | 2x/hour | Weekdays rush hours only |
| 10 | Centraal Station - Centrum - Papendrechtse Veer - Noordflank - P-Energiehuis | 3x/hour, but only 2x/hour on evenings and Sundays | |

=== Streekbussen ===
The regional bus lines provides services to/from:

- Centrum (downtown area)
- Stadskantoor (City Hall)
- Ziekenhuis Dordwijk (Hospital)
- Ziekenhuis Amstelwijck (Hospital)
- Biesbosch National Park
- The neighbourhoods Het Reeland, Krispijn, Leerpark, Staart and Wielwijk
- The industrial area West
- The nearby cities and towns Alblasserdam, Barendrecht, Hardinxveld-Giessendam, Hendrik Ido Ambacht, Papendrecht, Ridderkerk, Rotterdam, Sliedrecht and Zwijndrecht
- The city of Utrecht
- Villages around Dordrecht

The routes of the regional buses, serving Dordrecht, are as follows:

| Line | Operator | Route | Frequency | Notes |
|---|---|---|---|---|
| 11 | Arriva | Dordrecht, Centraal Station -> Dordrecht, Centrum -> Dordrecht, Stadskantoor -> Station Zwijndrecht -> Zwijndrecht -> Ziekenhuis Zwijndrecht -> Station Zwijndrecht -> Dordrecht, Centrum -> Dordrecht, Stadskantoor -> Dordrecht, Centraal Station | 1x/hour | Arrives/Continues at Dordrecht, Centraal Station as city bus line 2 to/from Dordrecht, Ziekenhuis Dordwijk and Dordrecht, Dubbeldam. (see also: Stadsbussen); Same route as line 12, but in the opposite direction |
| 12 | Arriva | Dordrecht, Centraal Station -> Dordrecht, Centrum -> Dordrecht, Stadskantoor -> Station Zwijndrecht -> Ziekenhuis Zwijndrecht -> Zwijndrecht -> Station Zwijndrecht -> Dordrecht, Centrum -> Dordrecht, Stadskantoor -> Dordrecht, Centraal Station | 1x/hour | Arrives/Continues at Dordrecht, Centraal Station as city bus line 2 to/from Dordrecht, Ziekenhuis Dordwijk and Dordrecht, Dubbeldam. (see also: Stadsbussen); Same route as line 11, but in the opposite direction |
| 13 | Arriva | Dordrecht, Centraal Station - Dordrecht, Het Reeland Zuid - Dordrecht, Ziekenhuis Dordwijk - Papendrecht - Station Sliedrecht Baanhoek - Sliedrecht | 1x/hour | |
| 14 | Arriva | Dordrecht, Centraal Station -> Dordrecht, Het Reeland Noord -> Dordrecht, Staart West -> Papendrecht -> Dordrecht, Staart West -> Dordrecht, Het Reeland Noord -> Dordrecht, Centraal Station | 1x/hour | Same route as line 15, but in the opposite direction |
| 15 | Arriva | Dordrecht, Centraal Station -> Dordrecht, Het Reeland Noord -> Dordrecht, Staart West -> Papendrecht -> Dordrecht, Staart West -> Dordrecht, Het Reeland Noord -> Dordrecht, Centraal Station | 1x/hour | Same route as line 14, but in the opposite direction |
| 16 | Arriva | Dordrecht, Centraal Station - Dordrecht, Het Reeland Zuid - Dordrecht, Ziekenhuis Dordwijk - Papendrecht - Alblasserdam | Outside Summer and Christmas holidays: 4x/hour on weekdays, 2x/hour on Saturdays, but only 1x/hour at all evenings and Sundays; Summer and Christmas holidays: 2x/hour, but only 1x/hour at evenings and Sundays | |
| 18 | Arriva | Dordrecht, Centraal Station - Dordrecht, Het Reeland Zuid - Dordrecht, Ziekenhuis Dordwijk - Papendrecht – Alblasserdam - Kinderdijk | 1x/hour | Weekdays only and not on evenings; At mornings buses operate only FROM Dordrecht TO Kinderdijk; At afternoons and evening rush hours buses operate only FROM Kinderdijk TO Dordrecht |
| 19 | Arriva | Dordrecht, Centraal Station - Dordrecht, Het Reeland Zuid - Dordrecht, Ziekenhuis Dordwijk - Papendrecht - Oud-Alblas - Nieuw-Lekkerland – Kinderdijk | 1x/hour | Weekdays only and not on evenings; At mornings buses operate only FROM Kinderdijk TO Dordrecht; At afternoons and evening rush hours buses operate only FROM Dordrecht TO Kinderdijk |
| 21 | Arriva | Dordrecht, Centraal Station - Dordrecht, Centrum - Dordrecht, Stadskantoor - Zwijndrecht – Hendrik-Ido-Ambacht - Ridderkerk | 1x/hour | |
| 88 | Arriva | Dordrecht, Centraal Station - Dordrecht, Centrum - Dordrecht, Stadskantoor - Station Zwijndrecht - Zwijndrecht - Hendrik-Ido-Ambacht - Rotterdam - Kralingse Zoom Rotterdam Metro station | Outside Summer and Christmas holidays: 4x/hour, but only 1x/hour on evenings and weekends; Summer and Christmas holidays: 4x/hour, but only 2x/hour during rush hours and 1x/hour on evenings and weekends | |
| 92 | Arriva | Dordrecht, Centraal Station - Dordrecht, Centrum - Dordrecht, Stadskantoor - Station Zwijndrecht - Zwijndrecht - Hendrik-Ido-Ambacht - Rotterdam – Station Rotterdam Lombardijen – Zuidplein Rotterdam Metro station | Outside Summer and Christmas holidays: 2x/hour, but 4x/hour during rush hours and only 1x/hour on evenings and weekends; Summer and Christmas holidays: 2x/hour, but only 1x/hour on evenings and weekends | |
| 143 | RET | Dordrecht, Centraal Station - Dordrecht, Centrum - Ridderkerk - Rotterdam – Station Rotterdam Lombardijen – Zuidplein Rotterdam Metro station | Outside Summer and Christmas holidays: 1x/hour, but 2x/hour during weekdays rush hours; Summer and Christmas holidays: 1x/hour | Not on evenings and Sundays |
| 165 | Connexxion | Dordrecht, Centraal Station - Dordrecht, Leerpark - Dordrecht, Krispijn - Dordrecht, Wielwijk - Dordrecht, Ziekenhuis Amstelwijck - ’s-Gravendeel - Mookhoek - Strijen | 1x/hour, but 2x/hour during rush hours | Not on evenings and weekends |
| 166 | Connexxion | Dordrecht, Centraal Station - Dordrecht, Leerpark - Dordrecht, Ziekenhuis Dordwijk - ’s-Gravendeel - Maasdam - Puttershoek - Blaaksedijk - Heinenoord – Rotterdam - Zuidplein Rotterdam Metro station | Dordrecht, Centraal Station-Heinenoord: 2x/hour, but only 1x/hour at evenings and Sundays; Heinenoord-Rotterdam Zuidplein Metro station: 1x/hour | At evenings and Sundays buses do not operate on section Heinenoord-Rotterdam Zuidplein Metro station |
| 168 | Connexxion | Dordrecht, Centraal Station - Dordrecht, Leerpark - Dordrecht, Ziekenhuis Dordwijk - ’s-Gravendeel - Maasdam - Heinenoord – Rotterdam - Zuidplein Rotterdam Metro station | 2x/hour | Weekdays rush hours only; At morning rush hours buses operate only FROM Dordrecht TO Rotterdam; At evening rush hours buses operate only FROM Rotterdam TO Dordrecht |
| 178 | Connexxion | Dordrecht, Centraal Station - Dordrecht, Leerpark - Dordrecht, Ziekenhuis Dordwijk - ’s-Gravendeel - Maasdam - Heinenoord | 2x/hour | Weekdays rush hours only; At morning rush hours buses operate only FROM Heinenoord TO Dordrecht; At evening rush hours buses operate only FROM Dordrecht TO Heinenoord |
| 388 | Arriva | Dordrecht, Centraal Station - Dordrecht, Ziekenhuis Dordwijk - Papendrecht - Sliedrecht - Bleskensgraaf - Molenaarsgraaf - Noordeloos - Meerkerk - Vianen - Utrecht | Outside Summer holidays: 1x/hour, but 3x/hour on weekdays rush hours; Summer holidays: 1x/hour, but 2x/hour on weekdays rush hours | Qliner, not on Saturday evenings and Sundays |
| 501 | Arriva | Dordrecht, Centraal Station - Dordrecht, Staart - Biesbosch National Park | 1x/hour | |
| 620 | Arriva | Dordrecht, Centraal Station - Werkendam | 7x/day FROM Werkendam TO Dordrecht, 4x/day FROM Dordrecht TO Werkendam | Not on evenings and weekends |
| 892 | Arriva | Station Rotterdam Centraal - Rotterdam - Hendrik-Ido-Ambacht - Zwijndrecht - Dordrecht, Centraal Station - Dordrecht, Centrum - Dordrecht, Stadskantoor - Dordrecht, Krispijn - Dordrecht, Zuidhoven - Dordrecht, Station Zuid - Dordrecht, Sterrenburg | 1x/hour | Nightbus service, Saturday Nights only; Buses FROM Dordrecht TO Rotterdam follow the normal route from Dordrecht, Sterrenburg to Dordrecht, Krispijn. From there these buses continue to Dordrecht, Centraal Station first and then to Dordrecht, Stadskantoor via Dordrecht, Centrum. From Dordrecht, Stadskantoor these buses continue directly to Rotterdam via highway A16 skipping Zwijndrecht and Hendrik-Ido-Ambacht along the way |
