= Sliedrecht Baanhoek railway station =

Railway station in the Netherlands

Sliedrecht Baanhoek
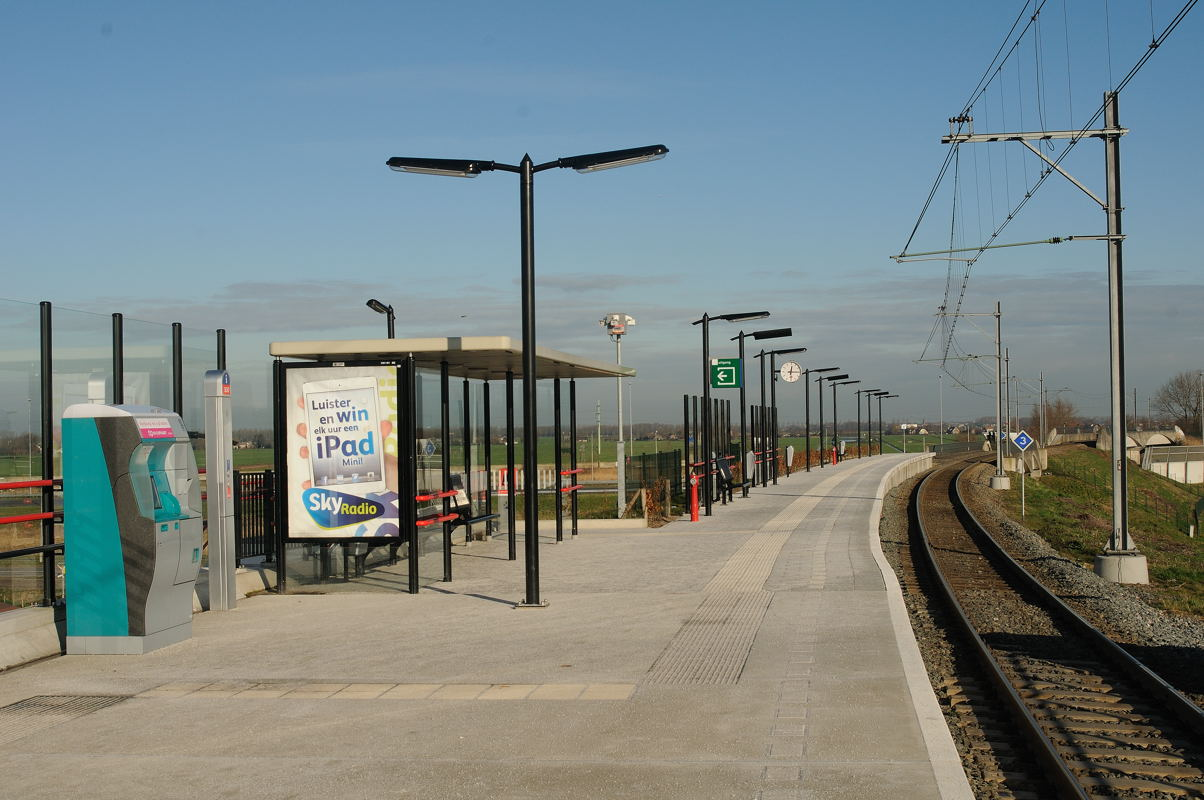
- The station is on an embankment.

General information
- Location: Sliedrecht, Netherlands
- Coordinates: 51°49′47″N 4°44′36″E
- Operator: Qbuzz
- Line: MerwedeLingelijn
- Platforms: 1

Construction
- Cycle facilities: Bicycle parking racks and free on train. Elevator in which also bicycles can be taken.

History
- Opened: 16 July 1885, reopened 11 December 2011
- Closed: 15 May 1938

Services
Preceding station	Arriva Netherlands	Following station
Dordrecht Stadspolders towards Dordrecht	Stoptrein 36700	Sliedrecht towards Geldermalsen
Dordrecht Stadspolders towards Dordrecht	Stoptrein 36800	Sliedrecht towards Gorinchem
Location
- Location within Netherlands

Sliedrecht Baanhoek is a railway station, in Sliedrecht, Netherlands.

== History ==
The station opened on 16 July 1885, but was closed on 15 May 1938. The station was reopened on 11 December 2011. The station lies on the MerwedeLingelijn (Dordrecht – Geldermalsen) and is located between Dordrecht Stadspolders and Sliedrecht. The station is primarily for western Sliedrecht, Papendrecht and small settlements in the area. Train services are operated by Qbuzz.

== Train services ==
Route	Service type	Operator	Notes
Dordrecht - Gorinchem - Geldermalsen	Local ("Stoptrein")	Qbuzz	2x per hour
Dordrecht - Gorinchem	Local ("Stoptrein")	Qbuzz	2x per hour, Mon-Sat only. Not after 21:00.

Bicycles are allowed on board for free.

== Bus services ==
Line	Route	Operator	Notes
8	Dordrecht Dordtse Kil - Dordrecht Industriegebied West - Dordrecht Central Station - Papendrecht Oosteind - Sliedrecht Baanhoek - Sliedrecht Stormrand	Qbuzz	Mon-Fri during daytime hours only. Does not operate between Dordrecht Central Station and Sliedrecht during Christmas and Summer Break.
191	Boven-Hardinxveld - Hardinxveld-Giessendam - Sliedrecht - Papendrecht - Ridderkerk - Rotterdam Zuidplein	Qbuzz	Rush hours only.
388	Rotterdam Kralingse Zoom - Papendrecht - Sliedrecht - Noordeloos - Meerkerk - Vianen - Utrecht Papendorp - Utrecht Centraal	Qbuzz	
491	Sliedrecht - Papendrecht - Ridderkerk Oostendam - Rotterdam Zuidplein	TCR	
891	Rotterdam Central Station - Alblasserdam - Papendrecht - Sliedrecht - Hardinxveld-Giessendam	Qbuzz	Saturday late nights (between midnight and 5:00) only.
904	Oud-Alblas - Sliedrecht	Qbuzz	This bus only operates if called one hour before its supposed departure ("belbus").
914	Wijngaarden - Sliedrecht Baanhoek	Qbuzz	This bus only operates if called one hour before its supposed departure ("belbus").
