= Koru (yacht) =

Luxury superyacht owned by Jeff Bezos

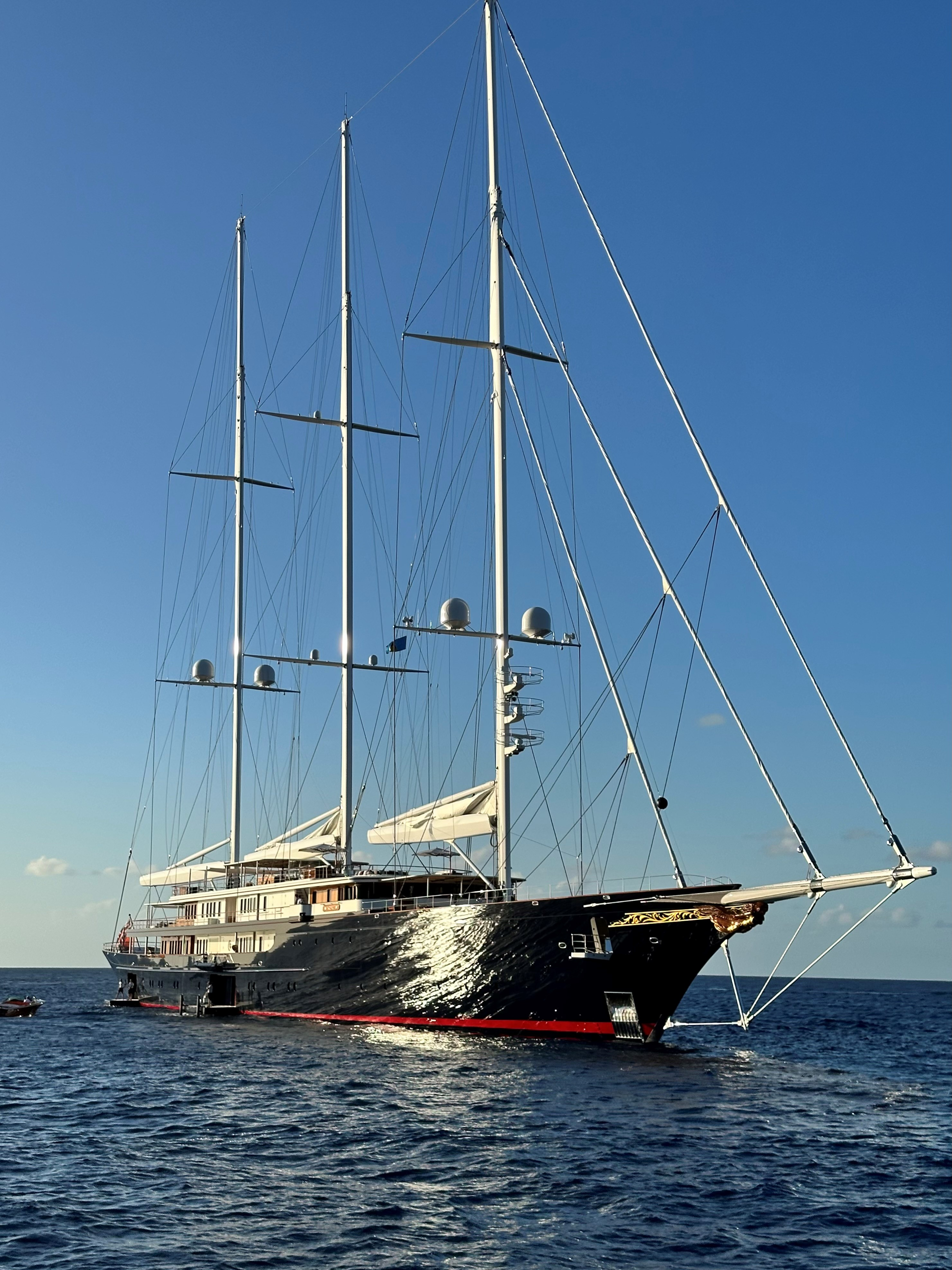
- Koru Superyacht anchored off the coast of St. Lucia on January 5th, 2024

History

Cayman Islands
- Name: Koru
- Owner: Jeff Bezos
- Builder: Oceanco
- Cost: $500 million
- Yard number: Y721
- Launched: 4 August 2022
- Notes: IMO number: 9857298; MMSI number: 319225400; Call sign: ZGQC5

General characteristics
- Class & type: Lloyd's Register
- Type: Schooner rigged sailing yacht
- Tonnage: 3,493 GT
- Length: 127 m (417 ft)
- Capacity: 18 passengers
- Crew: 40

Koru is a luxury custom superyacht owned by Jeff Bezos, the founder of Amazon. The vessel was built in the Netherlands by Oceanco starting in 2021, and delivered in April 2023. It is a three-masted sailing yacht 127 meters (417 ft) long with a navy blue hull. The superyacht is reported to have cost at least US$500 million, and to require annual maintenance costs of at least $30 million. When commissioned, the yacht was the second-largest sailing yacht in the world, after Andrey Melnichenko's Sailing Yacht A.

It is named after the same Māori cultural symbol. The koru represents a looped fern and signifies new beginnings.

== Koru and De Hef ==
In 2022, Rotterdam announced that the city's historic De Hef bridge would be temporarily partially dismantled to allow the yacht to pass through. This move was controversial because the bridge is a Dutch national monument owing to its history. Eventually the dismantling plan of the 'De Hef' bridge proved to be unnecessary; the masts were stepped when the vessel was moored downstream of the bridge in the Rotterdam Harbour.

== Support vessel ==
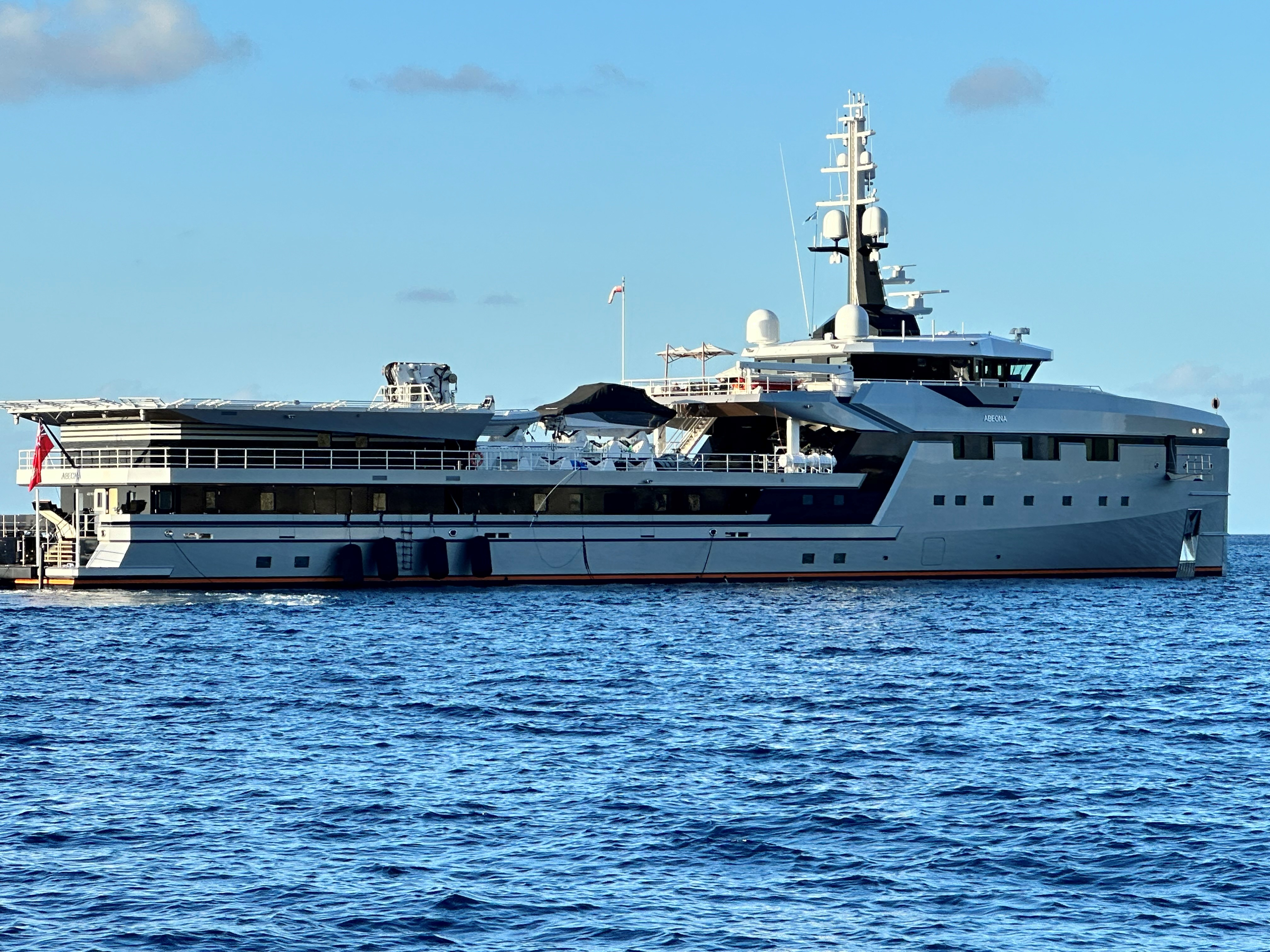
A 75-metre (246 ft) 1,900 gross ton yacht support vessel, the Abeona, "shadows" Koru, providing additional crew accommodation, a helipad with enclosed helicopter accommodation, and capacity for relief supplies.

== See also ==
- List of large sailing yachts
