= Dordrecht Stadspolders railway station =

Railway station in Dordrecht, Netherlands

Dordrecht Stadspolders
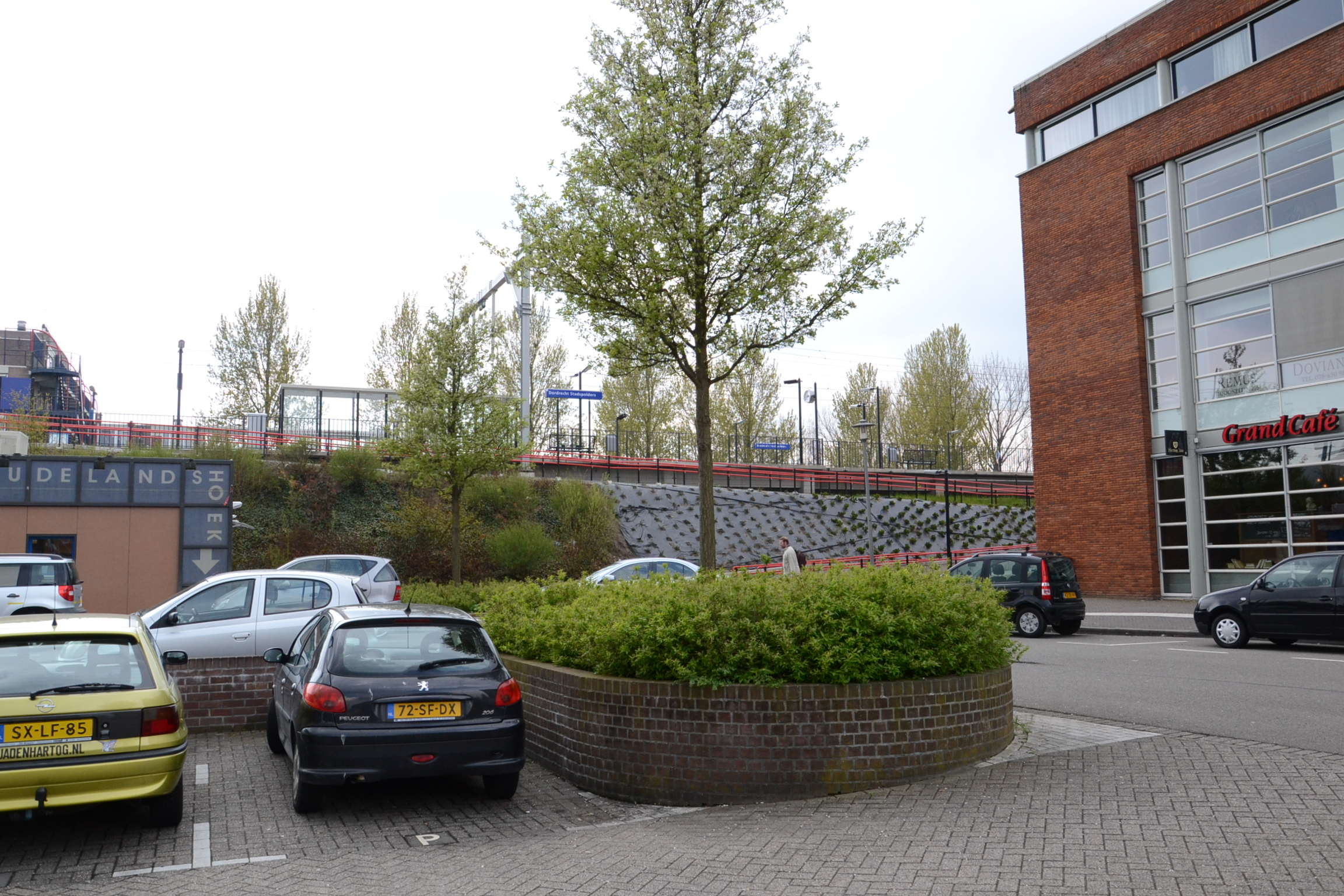
- The station is on an embankment

General information
- Location: Dudokplein, Dordrecht; Netherlands
- Coordinates: 51°48′07″N 4°43′00″E
- Operator: Qbuzz
- Line: MerwedeLingelijn
- Platforms: 2

Construction
- Cycle facilities: free on train

Other information
- Station code: Ddrs

History
- Opened: 27 May 1990

Services
Preceding station	Arriva Netherlands	Following station
Dordrecht Terminus	Stoptrein 36700 2x/hour	Sliedrecht Baanhoek towards Geldermalsen
Dordrecht Terminus	Stoptrein 36800 2x/hour; Not at evenings and Sundays	Sliedrecht Baanhoek towards Gorinchem
Location
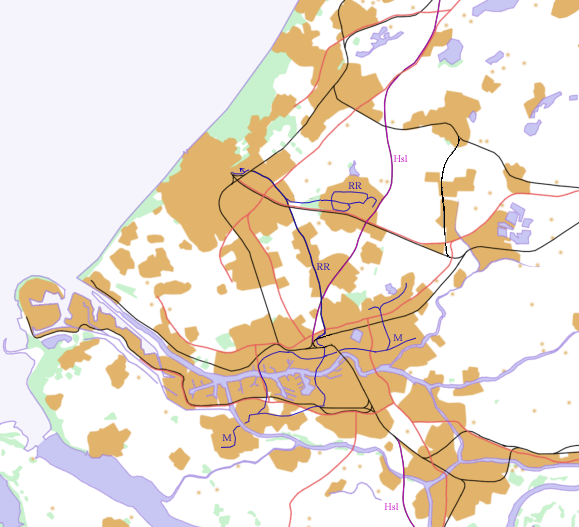
- Location within Southwest Randstad Location within Netherlands

Dordrecht Stadspolders is a railway station in Dordrecht, Netherlands. The station is located on the MerwedeLingelijn between Dordrecht and Geldermalsen (part of the Elst–Dordrecht railway). It was opened on 27 May 1990 and initially had only one track.

Arriva has operated the service since December 2006, but Qbuzz took over services on 9 December 2018. The station is in the residential area Stadspolders. The station was expanded in 2011, with the building of a second track and platform, to allow 4 trains per hour in each direction. The connection between this station and the Dordrecht railway station has also two tracks.

== Train services ==
Route	Service type	Operator	Notes
Dordrecht - Gorinchem - Geldermalsen	Local ("Stoptrein")	Qbuzz	2x per hour
Dordrecht - Gorinchem	Local ("Stoptrein")	Qbuzz	2x per hour, Mon-Sat only. Not after 21:00.

Bicycles are allowed on board for free.

== Bus services ==
Line	Route	Operator	Notes
3	Dordrecht Stadspolders Station - Oudelandshoek - Reeland - Central Station - Centrum (Downtown) - Oud-Krispijn - Crabbehof	Qbuzz	
5	Dordrecht Stadspolders - Reeland - Central Station - Centrum (Downtown) - Oud-Krispijn - Zuidhoven - Sterrenburg	Qbuzz	
