= Breda–Rotterdam railway =

Railway line in the Netherlands

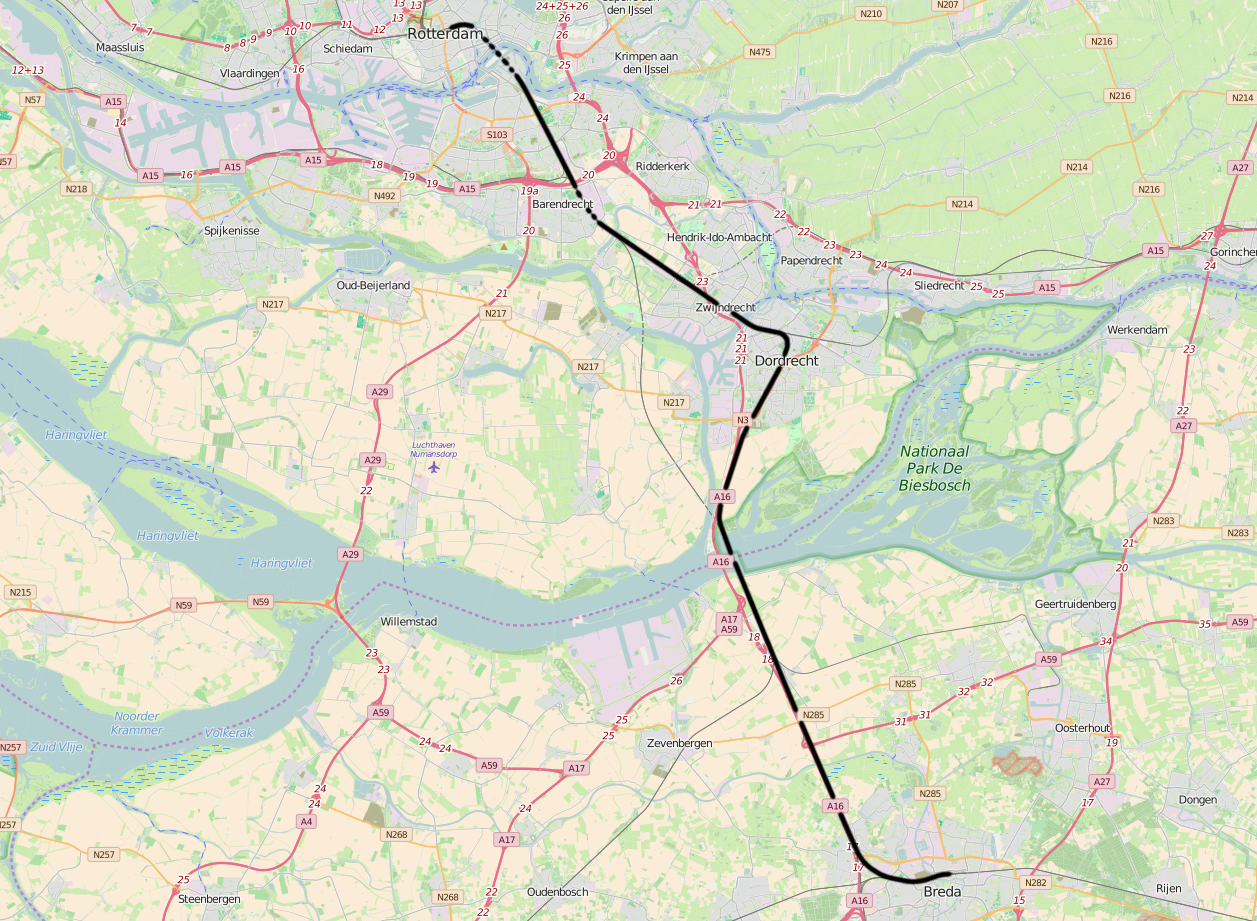
- Breda–Rotterdam railway map

Overview
- Status: Operational
- Locale: Netherlands
- Termini: Breda railway station; Rotterdam Centraal railway station

Service
- Operator(s): Nederlandse Spoorwegen

History
- Opened: 1866-1877

Technical
- Line length: 49 km (30 mi)
- Number of tracks: Breda–Dordrecht double track, Dordrecht–Rotterdam four tracks
- Track gauge: 1,435 mm (4 ft 8 1/2 in) standard gauge
- Electrification: 1.5 kV DC

The Breda–Rotterdam railway is a heavily used railway line in the Netherlands running from Breda to Rotterdam, passing through Dordrecht. It is also called the Staatslijn I ("state line I") in Dutch. The line was opened between 1866 and 1877.

The railway was opened in phases:

- 1 July 1866: Breda - Lage Zwaluwe - Moerdijk
- 1 January 1872: Lage Zwaluwe - Dordrecht, including the Moerdijk Bridge
- 1 November 1872: Dordrecht - Rotterdam Mallegat
- 1 May 1877: Rotterdam Mallegat - Rotterdam Delftsche Poort
- 2 December 1878: Rotterdam Mallegat - Rotterdam Feijenoord (goods transport only)

Until 1872, transport between Moerdijk and Rotterdam was by ferry.

The railway was electrified in 1950.

With the opening of the Willems Railway Tunnel in 1994, the Luchtspoor through the centre of Rotterdam became redundant. The railway viaducts and the old Willems Railway Bridge over the Nieuwe Maas were subsequently demolished, leaving only the lifting bridge De Hef over the Koningshaven which has been preserved as an industrial heritage site.

== Stations ==
The main interchange stations on the Breda–Rotterdam railway are:

- Breda: to Tilburg, Nijmegen, Roosendaal and Eindhoven
- Dordrecht: to Roosendaal and Gorinchem
- Rotterdam Centraal: to The Hague, Utrecht and Amsterdam
